= Cabinet Secretariat (Indonesia) =

Executive branch of Indonesian government

Cabinet Secretariat of the Republic of Indonesia
- Sekretariat Kabinet Republik Indonesia

Agency overview
- Formed: 13 November 1963; 62 years ago
- Jurisdiction: Government of Indonesia
- Agency executive: Teddy Indra Wijaya, Cabinet Secretary
- Parent department: President Military Secretariat of the Ministry of the State Secretariat
- Website: setkab.go.id

Logo of Cabinet Secretariat (2024)

The Cabinet Secretariat of the Republic of Indonesia (Indonesian: Sekretariat Kabinet Republik Indonesia, Setkab) is a government agency working directly beneath and answerable to the President of Indonesia. Its duties are to provide governance support for the president and vice president in managing the cabinet. The Cabinet Secretariat is currently headed by Cabinet Secretary Teddy Indra Wijaya.

Previously a separate agency, Setkab in Prabowo's administration, currently part of the President Military Secretariat under the Ministry of the State Secretariat, while most of its former functions performing strategic studies and assisting the cabinet transferred to the Cabinet Support Secretariat under the Ministry of the State Secretariat.

== List of cabinet secretaries ==
Below is the list of Cabinet Secretaries of Indonesia since its formation in 1963.

No.	Cabinet Secretary		Cabinet	Office term			Notes
No.	Portrait	Name	Cabinet	Term start	Term end	Term length	Notes
1		Abdul Wahab Surjoadiningrat	Fourth Working Cabinet	13 November 1963	27 August 1964	288 days	(Note: The official title is 'State Secretary for the Cabinet Presidium' [Sekretaris Negara pada Presidium Kabinet].)
1		Abdul Wahab Surjoadiningrat	Dwikora Cabinet	27 August 1964	22 February 1966	1 year, 179 days	(Note: The official title changed to 'Cabinet Presidium Secretary' [Sekretaris Presidium Kabinet].)
2		Djamin Ginting	Revised Dwikora Cabinet	1 March 1966	27 March 1966	26 days	(Note: The official title is Chief of the Presidential Cabinet [Kepala Kabinet Presiden].)
3		Hoegeng Imam Santoso	Second Revised Dwikora Cabinet	27 March 1966	25 July 1966	120 days	(Note: The official title is 'Secretary to the Cabinet/Presidium' [Sekretaris Kabinet/Presidium].)
4		Sudharmono	Ampera Cabinet	3 August 1966	11 October 1967	1 year, 69 days	(Note: The official title is 'Presidential Secretary to the Cabinet' [Sekretaris Presiden Kabinet].)
4		Sudharmono	Revised Ampera Cabinet	11 October 1967	25 March 1968	166 days	
—		Ali Affandi	Revised Ampera Cabinet	25 March 1968			(Note: The official title is 'Cabinet Secretary' [Sekretaris Kabinet].) (Note: See Presidential Decision Number 124/1968 [Keppres No. 124 Tahun 1968].)
(4)		Sudharmono	First Development Cabinet	5 April 1972	28 March 1973	357 days	(Note: Since 5 April 1972, State Secretary is also the Cabinet Secretary. See Presidential Decision Number 30/1972 [Keppres No. 30 Tahun 1972].)
(4)		Sudharmono	Second Development Cabinet	28 March 1973	29 March 1978	5 years, 1 day	(Note: Also served as Minister/State Secretary.)
(4)		Sudharmono	Third Development Cabinet	29 March 1978	1980		
5		Ismail Saleh	Third Development Cabinet	1980	1981		
6		Moerdiono	Third Development Cabinet	1981	19 March 1983		
6		Moerdiono	Fourth Development Cabinet	19 March 1983	21 March 1988	5 years, 2 days	(Note: The official title is 'Junior Minister of the Cabinet Secretary' [Menteri Muda Sekretaris Kabinet].)
7		Saadillah Mursjid	Fifth Development Cabinet	21 March 1988	17 March 1993	4 years, 361 days	
7		Saadillah Mursjid	Sixth Development Cabinet	17 March 1993	14 March 1998	4 years, 362 days	(Note: The official title is 'State Minister for the State Secretary/Cabinet Secretary' [Menteri Negara Sekretaris Negara/ Sekretaris Kabinet].)
7		Saadillah Mursjid	Seventh Development Cabinet	14 March 1998	21 May 1998	68 days	
8		Akbar Tanjung	Development Reform Cabinet	23 May 1998	10 May 1999	352 days	
9		Muladi	Development Reform Cabinet	10 May 1999	20 October 1999	163 days	
10		Marsillam Simajuntak	National Unity Cabinet	4 January 2000	2 July 2001	1 year, 179 days	(Note: The official title is 'Chief of the Cabinet Secretariat' [Kepala Sekretariat Kabinet].)
—		Erman Radjagukguk	National Unity Cabinet	2 July 2001	5 July 2001	3 days	(Note: As 'Acting Cabinet Secretary' [Pejabat Pelaksana Sekretaris Kabinet].)
11		Marzuki Darusman	National Unity Cabinet	5 July 2001	23 July 2001	18 days	(Note: The official title is 'Cabinet Secretary' [Sekretaris Kabinet].)
12		Bambang Kesowo	Mutual Assistance Cabinet	10 August 2001	20 October 2004	3 years, 71 days	(Note: The official title is 'State Secretary/Cabinet Secretary' [Sekretaris Negara/Sekretaris Kabinet].)
13		Sudi Silalahi	First United Indonesia Cabinet	21 October 2004	20 October 2009	4 years, 364 days	(Note: The official title is 'Cabinet Secretary' [Sekretaris Kabinet].)
14		Dipo Alam	Second United Indonesia Cabinet	7 January 2010	20 October 2014	4 years, 286 days	
15		Andi Widjajanto	Working Cabinet	3 November 2014	12 August 2015	282 days	
16		Pramono Anung	Working Cabinet	12 August 2015	20 October 2019	9 years, 39 days	
16		Pramono Anung	Onward Indonesia Cabinet	23 October 2019	20 September 2024	9 years, 39 days	
—		Pratikno	Onward Indonesia Cabinet	22 September 2024	20 October 2024	28 days	
17		Teddy Indra Wijaya	Red and White Cabinet	21 October 2024	Incumbent	1 year, 356 days	(Note: Post existed, but no longer an independent office.)
