= List of members of the Indonesian House of Representatives (1999–2004) =

This article lists the members of the People's Representative Council from 1999 to 2004. The 15th People's Representative Council follows the 1999 Indonesian legislative election held on 7 June 1999. There are 462 elected MPs and 38 appointed MPs in the Parliament.

== Speaker and Deputy Speaker ==
Name	Photo	Position	Party	Notes
Akbar Tandjung		Speaker	Golkar	
Soetardjo Soerjogoeritno		Deputy Speaker	Indonesian Democratic Party of Struggle	
Hamzah Haz		Deputy Speaker	United Development Party	Appointed as the Coordinating Minister for People's Welfare and Poverty Alleviation by President Abdurrahman Wahid on 28 October 1999
Tosari Widjaja		Deputy Speaker	United Development Party	
Khofifah Indar Parawansa		Deputy Speaker	National Awakening Party	Appointed as the State Minister of Women Empowerment by President Abdurrahman Wahid on 28 October 1999
Muhaimin Iskandar		Deputy Speaker	National Awakening Party	
Andi Mappetahang Fatwa		Deputy Speaker	National Mandate Party	

== Elected ==
=== Aceh ===
Name	Regency / City	Party	Notes
Nurdahri Ibrahim Nain	Aceh Besar	PPP	
Baihaqi AK	Central Aceh	PPP	
AR Rasyidi	West Aceh	PPP	
Nashiruddin Daud	South Aceh	PPP	
Karimun Usman	Sabang	PDI-P	
T Zulfikar Thayib Aly	East Aceh	PDI-P	
Armen Desky	Southeast Aceh	Golkar	
TM Nurlif	Aceh Singkil	Golkar	
Hasballah M Saad	Pidie	PAN	
T Syaiful Ahmad	Banda Aceh	PAN	
Mawardi Abdullah	North Aceh	PBB	
Muhibbuddin Waly	Simeulue	PNU	

Key:

- PPP (4)
- PDI-P (2)
- Golkar (2)
- PAN (2)
- PBB (1)
- PNU (1)

=== North Sumatra ===
Name	Regency / City	Party	Notes
Raja Kami Sembiring Meliala	Deli Serdang	PDI-P	
Zulfan Lindan	Medan	PDI-P	
Syahrul Azmir Matondang	Langkat	PDI-P	
Indira Sugondo	Asahan	PDI-P	
Erwin Pardede	Simalungun	PDI-P	
Benny Pasaribu	Labuan Batu	PDI-P	
Nuah Torong	Karo	PDI-P	
Firman Jaya Daeli	Nias	PDI-P	
SGB Tampubolon	North Tapanuli	PDI-P	
Irmadi Lubis	Mandailing Natal	PDI-P	
Baharuddin Aritonang	South Tapanuli	Golkar	
HM Syarfi Hutauruk	Central Tapanuli	Golkar	
Edi Ramli Sitanggang	Pematangsiantar	Golkar	
Rambe Kamarulzaman	Tanjungbalai	Golkar	
Agusman St Basa	Deli Serdang	Golkar	
Amaluddin Nasution	Deli Serdang	PPP	
Bachtiar Chamsyah	Medan	PPP	
Danial Tanjung	Sibolga	PPP	
Amri Husni Amir	Medan	PAN	
Sanusi Tambunan	Asahan	PAN	
K Tunggul Sirait	Toba Samosir	PDKB	
Sutradara Gintings	Dairi	PKP	
Aris Azhari Siagian	Binjai	PKB	
Nur Balqis	Tebing Tinggi	PBB	

=== West Sumatra ===
Name	Party	Regency / City
M. Azwir Dainy Tara	Golkar	Solok (Kab.)
Darul Siska	Golkar	Sawahlunto
Rusdi Zein	Golkar	Pasaman
DP Datuk Labuan	Golkar	Sawahlunto Sijunjung
Patrialis Akbar	PAN	Padang
Ambia B. Bustam	PAN	Solok (Kodya)
Herman Datuk L Bandaro	PAN	Agam
Syahrudji Tanjung	PPP	Pesisir Selatan
Aisyah Aminy	PPP	Lima Puluh Kota
Djamal Do'a	PPP	Padang Pariaman
Marah Simon	PDIP	Padang Panjang
Yohanes Lukman	PDIP	Payakumbuh
Irwan Prayitno	PK	Tanah Datar
MS Kaban	PBB	Bukit Tinggi

=== Bengkulu ===
Name	Party	Regency / City	Notes
Mishal Yofthie Suud	PDIP	Bengkulu Selatan	
Rully Chairul Azwar	Golkar	Rejang Lebong	
Achmad Farial Husein	PPP	Bengkulu	
Zainul Karim	PAN	Bengkulu Utara	

=== Jambi ===
Name	Party	Regency / City	Notes
Muhammad Junus Lamuda	PDIP	Bungo Tebo	
Agnita Singedekane	PDIP	Jambi	
Usman Ermulan	Golkar	Tanjung Jabung	
Tjarda Muchdar	Golkar	Batanghari	
Abdul Kadir Ismail	PPP	Sarolangun Bangko	
Zulkifli Nurdin	PAN	Kerinci	Appointed as Governor of Jambi in 1999.
Rizal Djalil	PAN	Kerinci	Replacing Zulkifli Nurdin since 24 March 2000.

=== Riau ===
Name	Party	Regency / City	Notes
Jahar Harahap	PDIP	Bengkalis	
Hanjoyo Putro	PDIP	Kepulauan Riau	
Pataniari Siahaan	PDIP	Pekanbaru	
Rosniar	Golkar	Kampar	
Muhammad Akil	Golkar	Indragiri Hilir	
Darwis Ridha	Golkar	Indragiri Hulu	
Razali Yahya	PPP	Bengkalis	
Abduh Paddare	PPP	Kampar	
Erman Suparno	PKB	Dumai	
Radja Roesli	PAN	Batam	

=== West Java ===
Name	Party		Notes
TB Suwondo	PDIP	Serang	
Tumbu Saraswati	PDIP	Pandeglang	
TB Mamas Chaerudin	PDIP	Lebak	
Wowo Ibrahim	PDIP	Tangerang (Kab.)	
Arifin Panigoro	PDIP	Tangerang (Kab.)	
Noviantika Nasution	PDIP	Bogor (Kab.)	
Amris Fuad Hassan	PDIP	Bogor (Kab.)	
Laksamana Sukardi	PDIP	Sukabumi (Kab.)	
Dadang Rukmana Mulya	PDIP	Cianjur	
Potsdam Hutasoit	PDIP	Bekasi (Kab.)	
Djajang Kurniadi	PDIP	Karawang	
Zaenal Arifin	PDIP	Subang	
Megawati Soekarnoputri	PDIP	Bandung (Kab.)	Elected as the Vice President on 20 October 1999.
Dwi Ria Latifa	PDIP	Bandung (Kab.)	Replacing Megawati Soekarnoputri since 5 August 2000.
Muchtar Budiana	PDIP	Bandung (Kab.)	
Didi Supriyanto	PDIP	Bandung (Kab.)	
HU Subarna	PDIP	Garut	
Tarto Sudiro	PDIP	Tasikmalaya (Kab.)	
Endang Karman Sastraprawira	PDIP	Ciamis	
Yoseph Umarhadi	PDIP	Cirebon (Kab.)	
Sambas Soerjadi	PDIP	Kuningan	
Sidarto Danusubroto	PDIP	Indramayu	
Agus Mulya Djumhana	PDIP	Majalengka	
Mangara M Siahaan	PDIP	Bandung (Kodya)	
Jusep Purwasuganda	PDIP	Bandung (Kodya)	
Wisnu Kuncoro	PDIP	Tangerang (Kodya)	
Panda Nababan	PDIP	Bekasi (Kodya)	
Rusman Lumbantoruan	PDIP	Depok	
Eldie Suwandie	Golkar	Serang	
Eki Syachrudin	Golkar	Lebak	
Mohamad Aly Yahya	Golkar	Tangerang (Kab.)	
Mohammad Hatta	Golkar	Bogor (Kab.)	
Awal Kusumah	Golkar	Bogor (Kab.)	
Djaja Subagdja Husein	Golkar	Sukabumi	
Arifin Yoesoef	Golkar	Cianjur	
MS Hidayat	Golkar	Bekasi (Kab.)	
Wasma Prayitno	Golkar	Karawang	
Ade Komaruddin	Golkar	Purwakarta	
Tubagus Haryono	Golkar	Subang	
Ferry Mursyidan Baldan	Golkar	Bandung (Kab.)	
Paskah Suzetta	Golkar	Bandung (Kab.)	
Agus Gumiwang Kartasasmita	Golkar	Sumedang	
Asep Ruhimat Sudjana	Golkar	Garut	
Ferdinsyah	Golkar	Tasikmalaya	
Agun Gunandjar Sudarsa	Golkar	Ciamis	
Djahidin	Golkar	Indramayu	
Evita Asmalda	Golkar	Majalengka	
Happy Bone Zulkarnaen	Golkar	Bandung (Kodya)	
Sa'adun Syibromalisi	PPP	Serang	
Sjaiful Rachman	PPP	Pandeglang	
Zarkasih Nur	PPP	Pandeglang	Appointed as Minister of Cooperation and Small & Medium Enterprises on 26 October 1999.
Burhanuddin Somawinata	PPP	Pandeglang	Replacing Zarkasih Nur since 25 January 2000.
Sjaiful Anwar Husein	PPP	Bogor (Kab.)	
Endang Zainal Abidin	PPP	Sukabumi	
Chaerul Anwar Lubis	PPP	Cianjur	
Zain Badjeber	PPP	Bekasi (Kab.)	
Nu'man Abdul Hakim	PPP	Bandung (Kab.)	Appointed as the Vice Governor of West Java in 2003.
Maksum Zailadry	PPP	Garut	
Endin AJ Soefihara	PPP	Tasikmalaya (Kab.)	
Chozin Chumaidy	PPP	Ciamis	
A.M. Saefuddin	PPP	Tangerang (Kodya)	
Alihardi Kiaidemak	PPP	Cilegon (Kodya)	
Muhammadi	PAN	Tangerang (Kab.)	
AM Luthfi	PAN	Bogor (Kab.)	
Mochtar Adam	PAN	Sukabumi (Kodya)	
Hatta Rajasa	PAN	Bandung (Kodya)	Appointed as Minister of Research and Technology on 10 August 2001.
Cecep Rukmana	PAN	Bandung (Kodya)	Replacing Hatta Rajasa since 19 November 2001.
M Rasyid Hidayat	PAN	Bekasi (Kodya)	
Samuel A Koto	PAN	Depok	
Ma'ruf Amin	PKB	Tangerang (Kab.)	
Moh Dawam Anwar	PKB	Bekasi (Kab.)	
Agus Suflihat Mahmud	PKB	Sumedang	
R Imang Mansur Burhan	PKB	Garut	
Syarif Ustman bin Yahya	PKB	Cirebon (Kab.)	
Abdul Khaliq Ahmad	PKB	Tangerang (Kodya)	
Yusril Ihza Mahendra	PBB	Bekasi (Kab.)	Appointed as Minister of Law and Human Rights on 26 October 1999.
Abdul Qadir Djaelani	PBB	Bekasi (Kab.)	Replacing Yusril Ihza Mahendra since 25 January 2000.
Hartono Mardjono	PBB	Cirebon (Kab.)	
Jusuf Amir Feisal	PBB	Cirebon (Kodya)	
Zirlyrosa Jami	PK	Karawang	
Soenmandjaja SD	PK	Bogor (Kab.)	
Hussein Naro	PP	Tangerang (Kab.)	
Amaruddin Djajasubita	PSII	Tasikmalaya (Kab.)	
Sayuti Rahawarin	Masyumi	Kuningan	
Tjetje Hidayat Padmadinata	PKP	Bogor (Kab.)	
Abdullah Al Wahdi	PNU	Sukabumi	

=== Jakarta ===
Name	Party	Notes
Roy B.B. Janis	PDIP	
Kwik Kian Gie	PDIP	Diangkat menjadi Menko Ekouin (1999)
Sabam Sirait	PDIP	
Aberson Marle Sihaloho	PDIP	
Saifullah Yusuf	PDIP	
Julius Usman	PDIP	
Achmad Aries Munandar	PDIP	
Hamzah Haz	PPP	Diangkat menjadi Menkokesrataskin (1999)
Rusjdi Hamka	PPP	
Munzir Tamam	PPP	
Amien Rais	PAN	
AM Fatwa	PAN	
Afni Achmad	PAN	
Akbar Tandjung	Golkar	
Gunariyah Kartasasmita	Golkar	
Noor Moh Iskandar SQ	PKB	
Nur Mahmudi Ismail	PK	Diangkat menjadi Menteri Kehutanan dan Perkebunan (1999)
Ahmad Sumargono	PBB	

Pengganti

Name	Notes	Akhir menjabat	Pengganti	Pelantikan
Kwik Kian Gie	Menko Ekouin	26 October 1999	Hobbes Sinaga	27 March 2002
Hamzah Haz	Menkokesrataskin	26 October 1999	Faisal Baasir	25 January 2000
Nur Mahmudi Ismail	Menteri Kehutanan dan Perkebunan	26 October 1999	Syamsul Balda	24 March 2000

=== Central Java ===
Name	Party	Regency / City	Notes
Ismangoen Noto Sapoetro	PDIP	Semarang (Kab.)	
Don Murdono	PDIP	Kendal	Terpilih menjadi Bupati Sumedang (2003)
Tjahjo Kumolo	PDIP	Grobogan	
Bambang Pranoto	PDIP	Pekalongan (Kab.)	
Agus Condro Prayitno	PDIP	Batang	
HRS Sastoro	PDIP	Tegal (Kab.)	
Muchtar Buchori	PDIP	Brebes	
Budiningsih	PDIP	Pati (Kab.)	
Ramson Siagian	PDIP	Pemalang	
Susaningtyas NH Kertapati	PDIP	Blora	
Hadi Wasikoen	PDIP	Banyumas	
Dimyati Hartono	PDIP	Cilacap	
Soepjan Rahardjo	PDIP	Purbalingga	
Ngarang "NG" Sembiring	PDIP	Banjarnegara	
Jacob Tobing	PDIP	Temanggung	
Sudarsono	PDIP	Purworejo	
Rustriningsih	PDIP	Kebumen	Terpilih menjadi Bupati Kebumen (2000)
Gunawan Wirosaroyo	PDIP	Klaten	
Sumaryoto	PDIP	Boyolali	
Suratal HW	PDIP	Sragen	
Gray Koes Moertiyah	PDIP	Sukoharjo	
Daniel Budi Setiawan	PDIP	Karanganyar	
Sri Utari Ratnadewi	PDIP	Wonogiri	
Willem M Tutuarima	PDIP	Semarang (Kodya)	
Widjanarko Puspoyo	PDIP	Pekalongan (Kodya)	Diangkat menjadi Kepala Bulog (2001)
Slamet Suryanto	PDIP	Surakarta	Terpilih menjadi Wali Kota Surakarta (2000)
HZ Arifin Djunaidi	PKB	Kendal	
Hanief Muslich	PKB	Demak	
Abdul Wahid Karim	PKB	Grobogan	
Matori Abdul Djalil	PKB	Tegal (Kab.)	Wakil Ketua MPR, Diangkat menjadi Menteri Pertahanan (2001)
Andi Najmi Fuadi	PKB	Brebes	
Imam Churmen	PKB	Pati (Kab.)	
Musa Abdillah	PKB	Banyumas	
Cholil Bisri	PKB	Magelang (Kab.)	
Alwi Shihab	PKB	Wonosobo	Diangkat menjadi Menteri Luar Negeri (1999)
Nur Iskandar	PKB	Kebumen	
Fathoni	Golkar	Semarang (Kab.)	
Daryatmo Mardiyanto	Golkar	Brebes	
Bambang Sadono	Golkar	Blora	
Slamet Effendi Yusuf	Golkar	Banyumas	
Priyo Budi Santoso	Golkar	Cilacap	
Soeharsoyo	Golkar	Boyolali	
Nikentari Musdiono	Golkar	Wonogiri	
Hajriyanto Y. Thohari	Golkar	Semarang (Kodya)	
Akhmad Muqowam	PPP	Kudus	
Suryadharma Ali	PPP	Pemalang	
Achmad Karmani	PPP	Jepara	
Abdullah Ubab Maimun Zubair	PPP	Rembang	
Abdullah Syarwani	PPP	Cilacap	
Chodidjah HM Saleh	PPP	Magelang	
Lukman Hakim Saifuddin	PPP	Tegal (Kodya)	
Munawar Soleh	PAN	Tegal (Kab.)	
Djoko Susilo	PAN	Jepara	
Achmad Arief	PAN	Klaten	
Alvin Lie Ling Piao	PAN	Semarang (Kodya)	
FX Sumitro	PNI MM	Sragen	
Probosoetedjo	PNI FM	Grobogan	
Amanullah	PBB	Salatiga	
Ismawan DS	PKP	Salatiga	
Mutammimul Ula	PK	Banjarnegara	

Pengganti

Name	Notes	Akhir menjabat	Pengganti	Pelantikan
Alwi Shihab	Menteri Luar Negeri	26 October 1999	Chatibul Umam Wiranu	6 December 2000
Rustriningsih	Bupati Kebumen	July 2000	Siti Soepami	5 August 2008
Widjanarko Puspoyo	Kepala Bulog	19 February 2001	Sutanto Pranoto	27 March 2002
Slamet Suryanto	Wali Kota Surakarta	28 July 2000	Utoyo	5 August 2008
Matori Abdul Djalil	Menteri Pertahanan	10 August 2001	Hanief Ismail	20 November 2002

=== Yogyakarta ===
Name	Party	Regency / City	Notes
Soetardjo Soerjogoeritno	PDIP	Sleman	Wakil Ketua DPR
Parte Tarigan Sibero	PDIP	Yogyakarta (Kodya)	
Zulkifli Halim	PAN	Sleman	
GBPH Joyokusumo	Golkar	Gunung Kidul	
Ali As'ad	PKB	Kulon Progo	
Husnie Thamrin	PPP	Bantul	

=== South Kalimantan ===
Name	Party	Regency / City	Notes
Syamsul Mu'arif	Golkar	Hulu Sungai Selatan	Diangkat menjadi Menneg Kominfo (2001)
Hasanuddin Murad	Golkar	Barito Kuala	
Ahmadi Noor Supit	Golkar	Kotabaru	
Ahmad Havizi Kurnain	PDIP	Banjarmasin	
Royani Haminullah	PDIP	Banjarbaru	
Muh Aunul Hadi	PPP	Banjar	
Syafriansyah	PPP	Hulu Sungai Utara	
Khalilurrahman	PKB	Tanah Laut	
Noor Adenan Razak	PAN	Tabalong	
M Qasthalani	PBB	Tapin	

Pengganti

Name	Notes	Akhir menjabat	Pengganti	Pelantikan
Syamsul Mu'arif	Menneg Kominfo	10 August 2001	Gusti Iskandar Sukma Alamsyah	6 February 2002

=== West Kalimantan ===
Name	Party	Regency / City	Notes
T Arsen Richson	Golkar	Sanggau	
M Akil Mochtar	Golkar	Kapuas Hulu	
Husni Thamrin	Golkar	Ketapang	
Oktavianus Riam Mapuas	PDIP	Pontianak (Kab.)	
Max Moein	PDIP	Pontianak (Kodya)	
Uray Faisal Hamid	PPP	Pontianak (Kab.)	
Massardy Kaphat	PDI	Sintang	
LT Susanto	PBI	Bengkayang	
Gregorius Seto Harianto	PDKB	Sambas	

=== East Kalimantan ===
Name	Party	Regency / City	Notes
Emir Moeis	PDIP	Berau	
Imam Mundjiat	PDIP	Samarinda	
Subagio Anam	PDIP	Balikpapan	
E Komariah Kuncoro	Golkar	Pasir	
Andas Tantri	Golkar	Tarakan	
Dja'far Siddiq	PPP	Kutai	
Murdiati Akma	PAN	Bulungan	

=== Central Kalimantan ===
Name	Party	Regency / City	Notes
Agustin Teras Narang	PDIP	Kapuas	
Tjandra Widjaja	PDIP	Kotawaringin Timur	
Chairun Nisa	Golkar	Barito Selatan	
Abdullah Zainie	Golkar	Kotawaringin Barat	
Rusnain Yahya	PPP	Palangkaraya	
Syaifullah Adnawi	PKB	Barito Utara	

=== North Sulawesi ===
Name	Party	Regency / City	Notes
Ahmad HS Pakaya	Golkar	Gorontalo	
Berny Tamara	Golkar	Minahasa	
Djelantik Mokodompit	Golkar	Bolaang Mangondow	
Hengky Baramuli	Golkar	Sangihe Talaud	
Theo Toemion	PDIP	Manado	
Engelina Pattiasina	PDIP	Bitung	
Sukardi Harun	PPP	Gorontalo	

=== Central Sulawesi ===
Name	Party	Regency / City	Notes
Pedi Tandawuya	Golkar	Poso	
Yetje Lanasi	Golkar	Donggala	
Muhammad Sofyan Mile	Golkar	Banggai	
Fauziah Abdullah	PDIP	Palu	
Muhammad Nawir	PPP	Buol Tolitoli	

=== Southeast Sulawesi ===
Name	Party	Regency / City	Notes
Laode Djeni Hasmar	Golkar	Buton	
Rustam E Tamburaka	Golkar	Kendari	
Anwar Adnan Saleh	Golkar	Kolaka	
Theo Syafei	PDIP	Kendari	
Habil Marati	PPP	Muna	

=== South Sulawesi ===
Name	Party	Regency / City	Komisi	Notes
Marian Akip	Golkar	Pinrang		
Paturungi Parawansa	Golkar	Gowa		
Syamsul Bachri	Golkar	Wajo		
Andi Mattalatta	Golkar	Bone		
Fachri Andi Laluasa	Golkar	Luwu		
Hamka Yandu R	Golkar	Sinjai		
Idrus Marham	Golkar	Bulukumba		
Ibnu Munzir BW	Golkar	Bantaeng		
Nurhayati Yasin Limpo	Golkar	Takalar		
Malkan Amin	Golkar	Barru		
Yasril Ananta Baharuddin	Golkar	Sidenreng Rappang		
Fachruddin	Golkar	Pangkajene Kepulauan		
Marwah Daud Ibrahim	Golkar	Soppeng		
Nurdin Halid	Golkar	Polewali Mamasa		
Ibrahim Ambong	Golkar	Luwu Utara		
Anwar Arifin	Golkar	Ujungpandang		
M. Arsyad Pana	PPP	Maros		
Noer Namry Noor	PPP	Majene		
Jacobus Kamarlo Mayong Padang	PDIP	Tana Toraja		
Sophan Sophiaan	PDIP	Parepare		
M Askin	PAN	Mamuju		
Mochtar Noer Jaya	PKB	Enrekang		
Zoubair Bakry	PBB	Selayar		
Hamid Mappa	IPKI	Jeneponto		

=== Bali ===
Name	Party	Regency / City	Notes
I Ketut Bagiada	PDIP	Buleleng	
N.G. Ayu Sukmadewi	PDIP	Klungkung	
I Made Rajeg	PDIP	Gianyar	
I Wayan Gunawan	PDIP	Karangasem	
I Gusti Ngurah Sara	PDIP	Badung	
I Made Urip	PDIP	Tabanan	
A.A. Sagung Hartini	PDIP	Denpasar	
Sylvia Ratnawati	Golkar	Jembrana	
Machrus Usman	PKB	Bangli	

=== West Nusa Tenggara ===
Name	Party	Regency / City	Notes
Effendi Jusuf	Golkar	Lombok Tengah	
Adi Putra Darmawan Tahir	Golkar	Lombok Timur	
Djamaluddin Sahidu	Golkar	Bima	
Burhan Djabir Magenda	Golkar	Dompu	
Mudhahir	PDIP	Mataram	
Izzul Islam	PPP	Lombok Barat	
Hatta Taliwang	PAN	Sumbawa	
Hamdan Zoelva	PBB	Lombok Barat	
Mudahan Hazdie	PDR	Lombok Timur	

=== East Nusa Tenggara ===
Name	Party	Regency / City	Notes
Charles J. Mesang	Golkar	Kupang (Kab.)	
Marthin Briaseran	Golkar	Belu	
J. M. Nailiu	Golkar	Timor Tengah Utara	
Cornelis Tapatab	Golkar	Timor Tengah Selatan	
Immanuel E. Blegur	Golkar	Alor	
Umbu Mehang Kunda	Golkar	Sumba Timur	Terpilih menjadi Bupati Sumba Timur (2000)
V. B. da Costa	PDIP	Sikka	
Paulus Maloa Saul De Ornay	PDIP	Flores Timur	
Jacob Nuwa Wea	PDIP	Ngada	Diangkat menjadi Menteri Tenaga Kerja dan Transmigrasi (2001)
Julius Bobo	PDIP	Manggarai	
Matheos Pormes	PDIP	Kupang (Kodya)	
Manasse Malo	PDKB	Kabupaten Sumba Barat	
Abdul Kadir Aklis	PPP	Ende	

Pengganti

Name	Notes	Akhir menjabat	Pengganti	Pelantikan
Umbu Mehang Kunda	Bupati Sumba Timur	2000	Lapoe Moekoe	27 April 2001
Jacob Nuwa Wea	Menteri Tenaga Kerja dan Transmigrasi	10 August 2001	Ni Luh Mariyani Tirtasari	27 March 2002

=== East Timor ===
Name	Party	Regency / City	Notes
Setya Novanto	Golkar		
Natercia M.J.O. Soares	Golkar		
Ronny B. Hutagaol	PDIP		
Rekso Ageng Herman	PDIP		

=== Maluku ===
Name	Party	Regency / City	Notes
Muhammad Yamin Tawary	Golkar	Maluku Utara	
Hasanuddin Mochdar	Golkar	Halmahera Tengah	
J.E. Sahetapy	PDIP	Maluku Tenggara	
Alexander Litaay	PDIP	Ambon	
M. Thahir Saimima	PPP	Maluku Tengah	
Arnold Nicolas Radjawane	PDKB	Ternate	

=== Irian Jaya ===
Name	Party	Regency / City	Notes
Marthina Mehue Wally	Golkar	Jayapura (Kab.)	
S.M. Tampubolon	Golkar	Manokwari	
Jacobus Perviddya Solossa	Golkar	Sorong	
Ruben Gobay	Golkar	Paniai	
Simon Patrice Morin	Golkar	Jayapura (Kodya)	
F.H. Toam	PDIP	Fakfak	
Parlin Sinaga	PDIP	Biak Numfor	
Paul Serak Baut	PDIP	Merauke	
N.A. Maidepa	PDIP	Mimika	
Astrid Susanto	PDKB	Nabire	
Rahman Sulaiman	PAN	Yapen Waropen	
Marcus Mally	PDIP	Puncak Jaya	
Antonius Rahail	PDI	Jayawijaya	

== Appointed ==
Name	Rank	Service Branch	Notes
Supriadi		Police	
Rukmini		Army	
Hendi Tjaswadi		Air Force	
Ronggo Soenarso		Navy	
Suparno Muanam		Air Force	
Suwitno Adi		Navy	
Benyamin Balukh		Army	
Christina M Rantetana		Navy	
Sudarmadji		Army	
Ferry Tinggogoy		Army	
Prayogo		Army	
Achmad Roestandi		Army	
Ignatius Mulyono		Army	
Sutanto		Air Force	
Rudy Supriatna		Army	
Soeyatno		Army	
Ngatimin Nanto		Army	
Budi Harsono		Army	
Tayo Tarmadi		Army	
Syamsul Ma'arif		Army	
Zawiah Ramlie		Army	
Aryasa		Air Force	
Sudiyotomo		Army	
Sangiang Makmur Siregar		Army	
Hari Sabarno		Army	
I Ketut Astawa		Army	
Soenarto		Air Force	
Mardiono		Navy	
Poeroto Setyo Handojo		Navy	
I Gusti Ngurah Sebudhie		Navy	
Wulang Trinur Widodo		Navy	
Ishak Latuconsina		Navy	
Uddy Rusdilie		Army	
Sri Hardjendro		Army	
Parman		Army	
Taufiequrochman Ruki		Army	
Posma Lumban Tobing		Army	
Sudirman		Navy	
