= Abdul Qadir Djaelani =

Indonesian politician (1938–2021)

Member of People's Representative Council
- In office 25 January 2000 – 30 September 2004
- President: B. J. Habibie
- Preceded by: Yusril Ihza Mahendra

Personal details
- Born: 20 October 1938 Batavia, Dutch East Indies
- Died: 23 February 2021 (aged 82) Bogor, West Java, Indonesia
- Party: Crescent Star Party
- Spouse: Lilis Badriyah
- Children: 8
- Occupation: Islamic preacher, Politician

Abdul Qadir Djaelani (20 October 1938 – 23 February 2021) was an Indonesian Islamic preacher, writer, activist, and politician who served as member of parliament for period 2000–2004.

This man who is familiarly called AQDJ become Member of the House of Representatives (Indonesia) 2000-2004 Honorably Replacing Yusril Ihza Mahendra who was minister. He was also a firm and good preacher. When he was young he was also active in organizations and became one of the founders of the Indonesian Islamic Youth Organization (PII) and he was also a student activist in the 1966 demonstration. Abdul Qadir Djaelani is also one of the important figures of the Crescent Star Party (Indonesia) and And he was a lecturer at IPB University although only briefly because he entered the world of politics he was also a ever been member of the Masyumi party which was eventually disbanded.

Djaelani died on 23 February 2021.
