= Muladi =

Muladi may refer to:

- Muladí, a native Iberian Muslim in al-Andalus
- Muladi (politician) (1943-2020), Indonesian academic
