= Pratikno =

Indonesian politician and academic

- Official Portrait, 2025

6th Chairman of the Presidential Advisory Council
- Incumbent
- Assumed office 2 October 2026
- President: Prabowo Subianto
- Preceded by: Wiranto

19th Coordinating Minister for Human Development and Cultural Affairs
- In office 21 October 2024 – 1 October 2026
- President: Prabowo Subianto
- Preceded by: Muhadjir Effendy
- Succeeded by: Sugiono

17th Minister of the State Secretariat
- In office 27 October 2014 – 20 October 2024
- President: Joko Widodo
- Preceded by: Sudi Silalahi
- Succeeded by: Prasetyo Hadi

Acting Cabinet Secretary of Indonesia
- Acting; 22 September 2024 – 20 October 2024
- President: Joko Widodo
- Preceded by: Pramono Anung
- Succeeded by: Teddy Indra Wijaya

14th Rector of Gadjah Mada University
- In office 16 July 2012 – 24 November 2014
- Preceded by: Soedjarwadi
- Succeeded by: Dwikorita Karnawati

Personal details
- Born: 13 February 1962 (age 64) Padangan, Indonesia
- Party: Independent
- Education: Gadjah Mada University (Drs.); University of Birmingham (MSocSc); Flinders University (PhD)
- Occupation: Academician

Pratikno (born 13 February 1962) is an Indonesian politician and academic. He currently serving as Coordinating Minister for Human Development and Cultural Affairs. He also served as the Minister / Secretary of State of Indonesia in the Onward Indonesia Cabinet, the cabinet appointed by President Joko Widodo for his second term in office 2019–2024.

Pratikno was formerly Dean of the Faculty of Social and Political Science at Gadjah Mada University in Yogyakarta, Indonesia, before becoming Rektor of the University in 2012. He resigned as Rektor on being appointed State Secretary in the first Joko Widodo administration in 2014.

== Early life ==
Born at Bojonegoro in East Java, Pratikno graduated from Gadjah Mada University in 1985 where he studied public administration. He then received a Master's degree in Development Administration from Birmingham University and Doctoral degree from the Department of Asian Studies, Flinders University, in Adelaide, South Australia.
