= Impeachment of Abdurrahman Wahid =

Indonesian political event in 2001

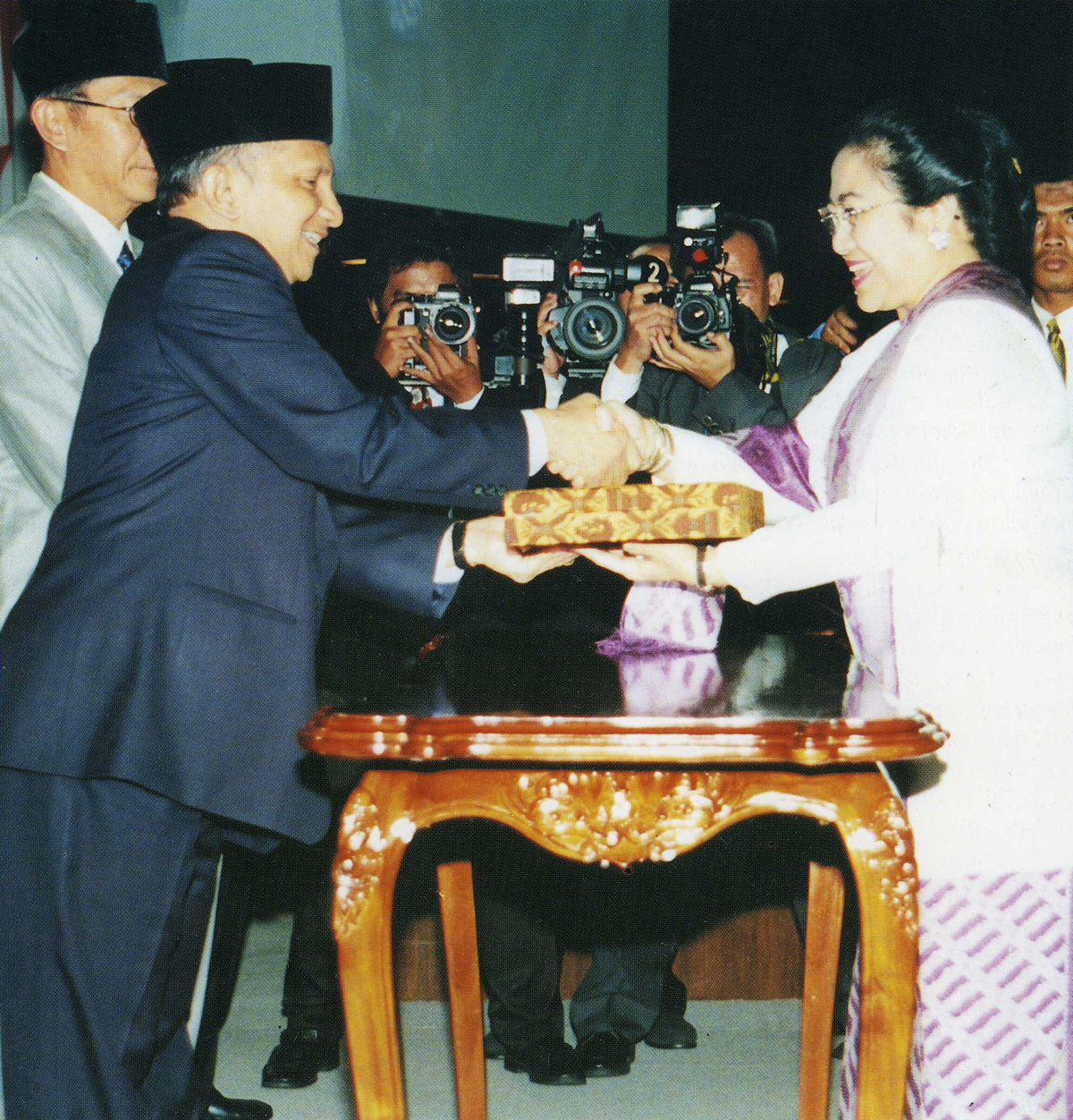
Megawati being congratulated for winning the MPR special session in 2001, after Wahid's impeachment

Abdurrahman Wahid, also known as Gus Dur, was impeached and dismissed as the fourth president of Indonesia on 23 July 2001, after he issued a decree to dissolve the Indonesian legislature and suspend the Golkar Party.

In response to Wahid's actions, Megawati Sukarnoputri and the People's Consultative Assembly agreed to remove Wahid from office and Sukarnoputri took office as the new president.

== Background and impeachment ==
The 2001 Special Session was held with the agenda of dismissing Abdurrahman Wahid after various conflicts with the parliament. This action was preceded by the issuance of the first memorandum on 1 February 2001. Then followed by a second note on April 30, 2001, accompanied by a request from the DPR to the MPR for a special session to be held.

Abdurrahman Wahid responded to this effort by issuing a decree declaring the dissolution of the MPR/DPR, setting up elections within a year, and the suspension of the Golkar Party. But in the end he didn't get any support and the MPR approved the dismissal of Abdurrahman Wahid as president. He was replaced by Vice President Megawati Soekarnoputri through a Special Session on 23 July 2001. (Note: In the Indonesian constitution, if a president was removed by force or death, the person that will replace the presidential position will be the vice president. In this case, Megawati was the vice president.)

=== Impeachment ===
On 23 July 2001, 15:00 Western Indonesia Time (UTC+7), the MPR held a plenary meeting to vote the impeachment of Wahid, there were factions from F-KB and F-PDKB that attended the meeting. The result of the vote was 591 votes in favor of dismissing President Abdurrahman Wahid as well as appointing Vice President Megawati Sukarnoputri as the replacement president.

== Aftermath ==
2001 Indonesian vice-presidential election
- 26 July 2001

610 members of the People's Consultative Assembly 306 electoral votes needed to win
- Turnout: 95.25% (▼2.61pp)
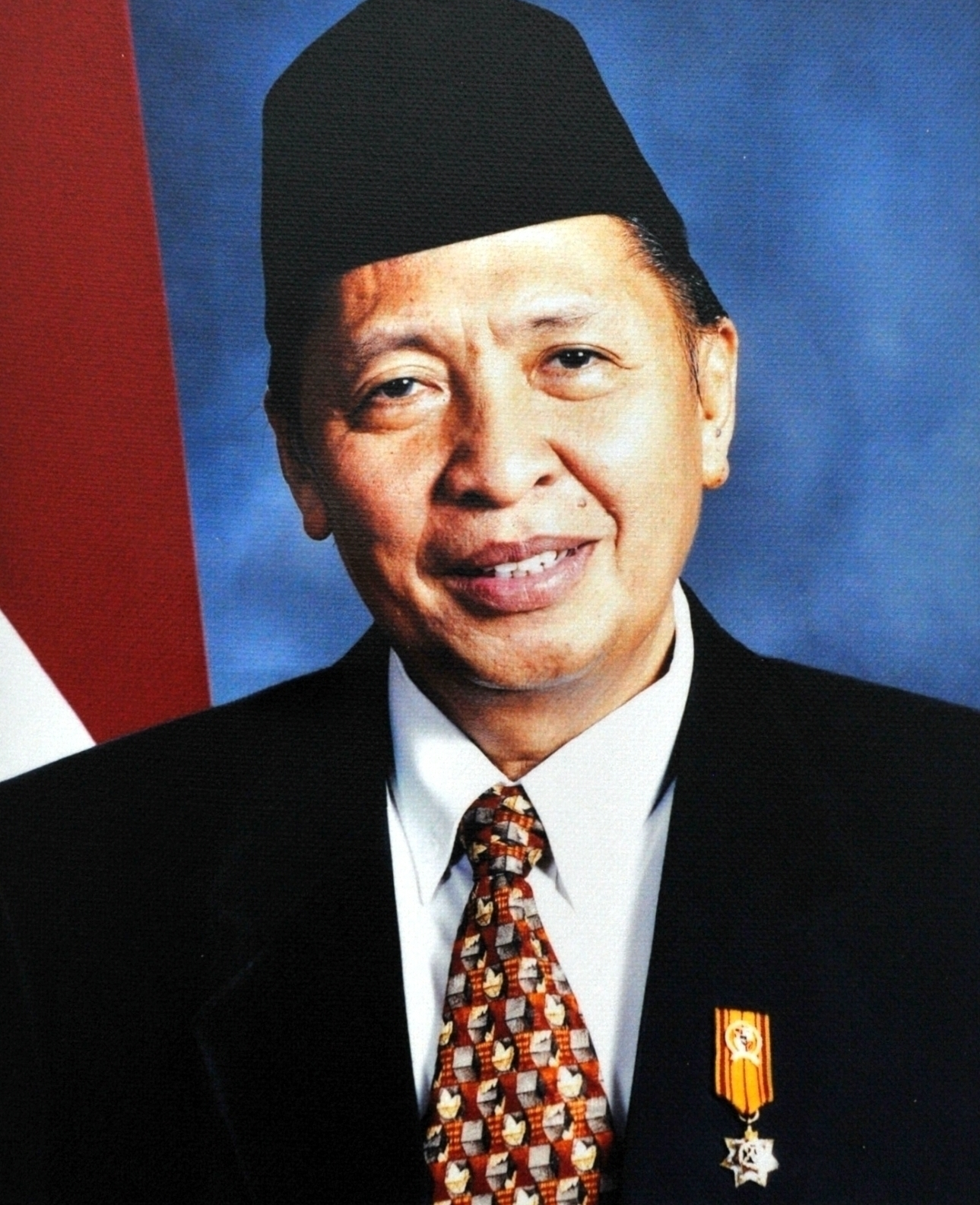

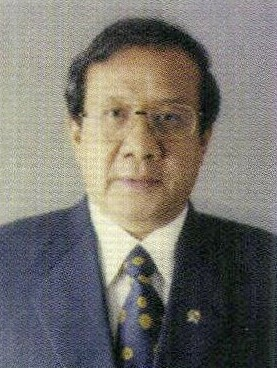
Nominee	Hamzah Haz	Akbar Tandjung
Party	PPP	Golkar
Electoral vote	340	237
Percentage	58.93%	41.07%
- Votes of the People's Consultative Assembly Hamzah Haz: 340 votes Akbar Tandjung: 237 votes Invalid votes: 4 Abstentions: 29
Vice President before election
Vacant
Elected Vice President
Hamzah Haz
PPP

As a response to Abdurrahman Wahid's Decree, the People's Consultative Assembly (MPR) held a special session to impeach Wahid on 23 July 2001, which was successful. The Assembly subsequently swore in Vice President Megawati as the new president. Megawati was the first woman to become president of Indonesia.

The MPR Special Session also scheduled the election of a vice president, which was vacant due to Megawati's ascension to the presidency. There were five candidates: Agum Gumelar, proposed by the F-PDU; Susilo Bambang Yudhoyono, proposed by the F-KKI and 80 MPR members; Akbar Tandjung, proposed by the F-PG; Hamzah Haz, proposed by the F-PPP and the Reform Faction; and Siswono Yudo Husodo, proposed by 79 MPR members. The election took place at the 5th plenary session of the MPR on Wednesday, 26 July 2001.

Because there were no candidates who met the requirements to be elected, that is, out of half the number of legislative members present, a third round of elections was held. In this third round, Hamzah Haz was elected vice president after winning 340 votes out of 610 total votes. Meanwhile, Akbar Tandjung received 237 votes, leaving only 4 invalid votes and 29 abstentions.

Candidate	Nominated by	First Round		Second Round		Third Round	
Candidate	Nominated by	Votes	% of votes	Votes	% of votes	Votes	% of votes
Hamzah Haz	United Development Party	238	39,08%	254	42,05%	340	58,92%
Akbar Tandjung	Golkar	177	29,06%	203	33,60%	237	41,07%
Susilo Bambang Yudhoyono	National Unity of Indonesia Fraction	122	20,03%	147	24,33%		
Agum Gumelar	Union of Ummah Sovereignty Fraction	41	6,73%				
Siswono Yudo Husodo	Reformation Fraction	31	5,09%				
Abstain		4		3		29	
Valid votes		609		604		577	
Invalid/blank votes		0		2		4	
Registered voters		613		609		610	

== Controversies ==
On 22 August 2021, Indonesian Coordinating Minister for Political, Legal, and Security Affairs Mahfud MD made a statement on Abdurrahman Wahid's impeachment. On the Nahdlatul Ulama's YouTube channel, he stated that Wahid's impeachment was an unconstitutional and unlawful action. Mahfud MD stated that the impeachment of Gus Dur in 2001 was not in accordance to the Resolutions of the People's Consultative Assembly (Ketetapan Majelis Permusyawaratan Rakyat) No. III of 1978 Regarding the Position and Work System of the Highest State Institution with/or State High Institutions. Mahfud also expressed that the impeachment by the special session of the People's Consultative Assembly had different cases between memorandums I, II, and III.
