= Indonesian National Student Movement =

Student's organisation

- Gerakan Mahasiswa Nasional Indonesia
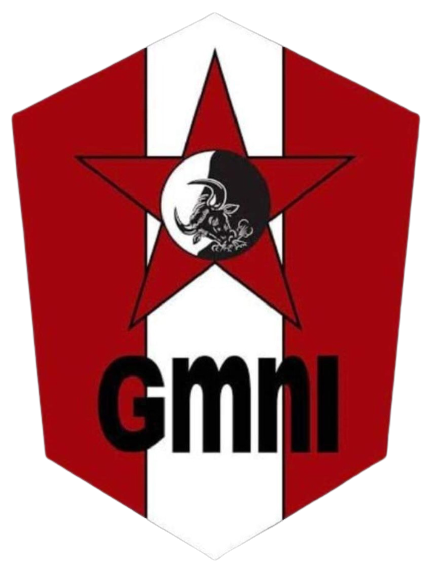
- Abbreviation: GMNI
- Formation: March 23, 1954; 72 years ago
- Founded at: Jakarta
- Merger of: Marhaen Student Movement (GMM); Independent Student Movement (GMM); Indonesian Democratic Student Movement (GMDI)
- Type: Extra-campus student organisation
- Headquarters: Jakarta, Indonesia
- Official language: Indonesian
- Chairman of the DPP: Sujahri Somar
- Secretary General: Amir Mahfut
- Website: dppgmni.org

The Indonesian National Student Movement (Indonesian: Gerakan Mahasiswa Nasional Indonesia; abbreviated as GMNI or, according to the writing style on the emblem, GmnI) is one of the extracampus student organisations found in almost all parts of Indonesia, especially cities or regencies with universities. GMNI was established on 23 March 1954 in Surabaya (the idea was born in Jakarta). GMNI is an organisation resulting from the merger or fusion of three previously established student organisations; the Marhaen Student Movement (based in Yogyakarta), the Free Student Movement (based in Surabaya), and the Indonesian Democratic Student Movement (based in Jakarta).

Currently, the structure of the GMNI Central Leadership Council (DPP) for the 2019‒2022 period is chaired by Arjuna Putra Aldino with the secretary general M. Ageng Dendy Setiawan.

== History ==
The idea for a merger first emerged from the chairman of the Indonesian Democratic Student Movement, S.M. Hadiprabowo in September 1953. Based on the desire to unite nationalist student organisations, S.M Hadiprabowo then arranged a meeting with the leaders of the other two organisations. Hadiprabowo met Slamet Djajawidjaja, Slamet Rahardjo and Haruman from the Gerakan Mahasiswa Merdeka. He then met Wahyu Widodo, Subagio Masrukin, and Sri Sumantri from the Marhaenis Student Movement.

The leaders of the three organisations finally agreed to hold a meeting. The meeting was held at the official residence of the Mayor of Jakarta (equivalent to the current Governor of Jakarta), Soediro. During the meeting, the three organisations reached an agreement to fuse, both organisationally and ideologically. During the meeting, the name Gerakan Mahasiswa Nasional Indonesia (GMNI) was chosen as the name of the fused organisation, and nationalism and marhaenism were agreed to be the ideologies of GMNI. In addition to these two things, the meeting also decided that the first GMNI Congress would be held in Surabaya.

On 23 March 1954, the first GMNI Congress was held with the direct blessing of President Sukarno. The first congress appointed S.M Hadiprabowo as the first chairman of GMNI. The date was also patented as the GMNI's birthday and commemorated as dies natalis or GMNI's birthday.

The relationship between the PNI and GMNI was officially broken after the New Order regime implemented a party fusion policy in 1973, in which the PNI was merged with other nationalist parties into the Indonesian Democratic Party (PDI).

== Symbol ==
=== Form ===
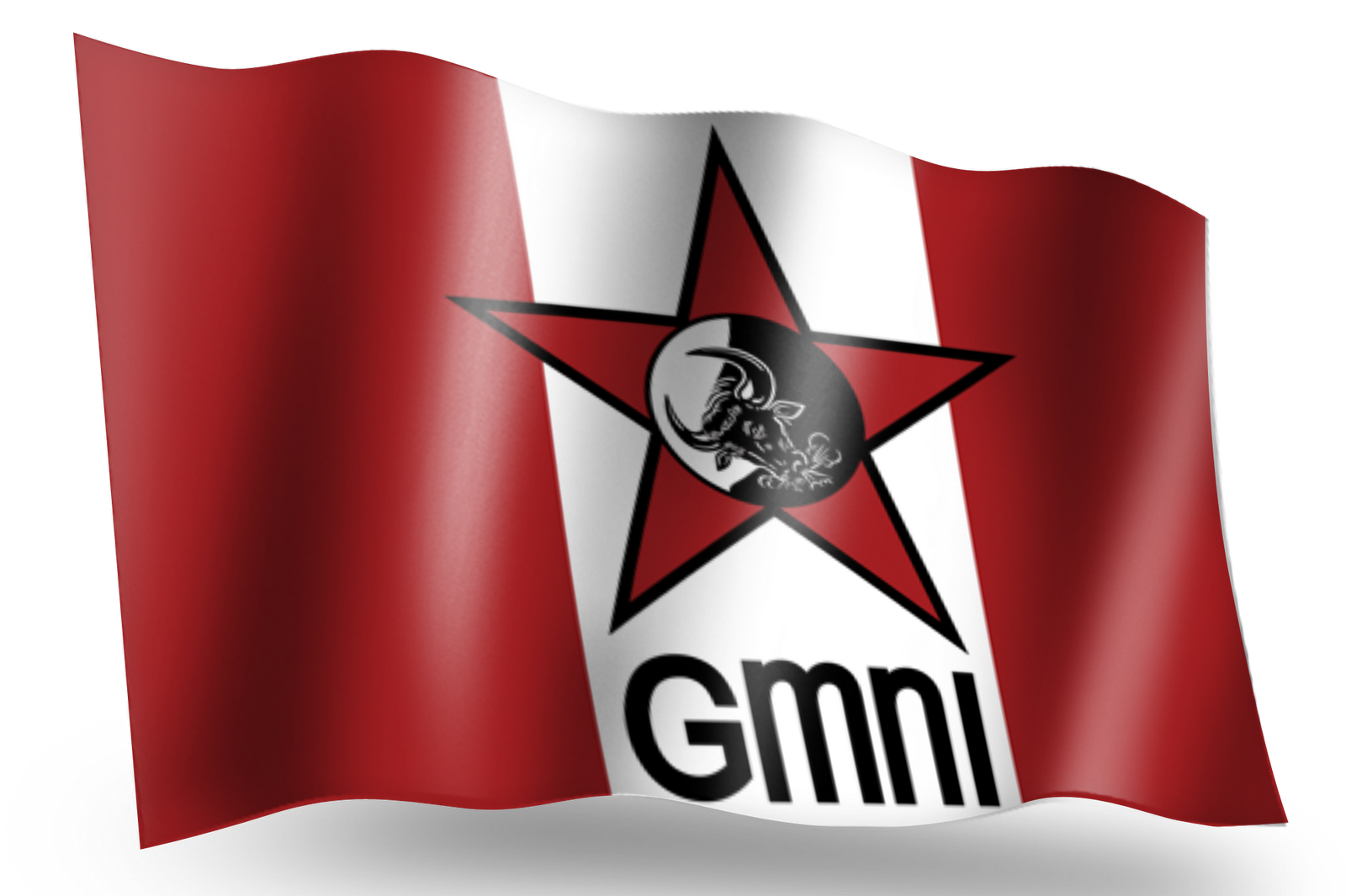
Flag of the GMNI

The GMNI emblem is a shield with six corners, three at the top and three at the bottom. The top three corners represent the three precepts (trisila) of marhaenism – the ideology created by Soekarno and officially adopted by the organisation – namely Socio-nationalism, Socio-democracy, and the belief of God in multiculturalism. (Note: Imprecise translation, often misconstrued as endorsement of monotheism or God of multiculturalism. It is an explicit acknowledgement of Dzat Yang Maha Kuasa ('almighty substances', or more exactly, divine providence) and meant as the principle of living together in a society with a diversity of religions and beliefs. It is not meant to be a theological principle on how belief/religions should be practiced.) While the 3 corners underneath symbolise the tridharma of higher education, namely: education, research, and service.

=== Elements ===
The red and white colours represent the Red and White Flag, red means courage and white means sacred, while black means firmness. The star symbolises the nobleness of ideals. The bull is a symbol of the marhaen people, which means GMNI exists to defend the marhaen people.

== Notable figures ==
As one of the oldest student organisations in Indonesia, GMNI has also contributed to producing well-known cadres. The following are some names of GMNI alumni who became national figures:

- Megawati Soekarnoputri (5th President of the Republic of Indonesia and chairman of the Indonesian Democratic Party of Struggle)
- Suko Sudarso (Indonesian National Party figure)
- Bondan Gunawan (former Secretary of state)
- Siswono Yudo Husodo (politician of the Golongan Karya Party)
- Soerjadi (one of the founders of the Indonesian Youth National Committee and Activist of 66)
- Taufiq Kiemas (former Speaker of the People's Consultative Assembly of the Republic of Indonesia)
- Eros Djarot (culturist, journalist, and founder of Tabloid Detik)
- Theo L. Sambuaga (Businessperson and politician of the Golongan Karya Party)
- Ahmad Basarah (Indonesian Democratic Party of Struggle politician)
- Antasari Azhar (former chairman of the Corruption Eradication Commission of the Republic of Indonesia)
- Arief Hidayat (former chairman of the Constitutional Court of the Republic of Indonesia)
- Soekarwo (former governor of East Java and Democratic Party politician)
- Ganjar Pranowo (Governor of Central Java and Indonesian Democratic Party of Struggle politician)
- Djarot Saiful Hidayat (former Governor of the Special Capital Region of Jakarta and Indonesian Democratic Party of Struggle politician)
- Eva Kusuma Sundari (Indonesian Democratic Party of Struggle politician)
- Dhia P. Yoedha (former Kompas journalist and co-founder of the Alliance of Independent Journalists)
- Peter Kasenda (academic and expert staff of the Pancasila Ideology Development Agency)
- Amarullah Nasution (Businessman/North Sumatra education figure)
- Soeparto Tjitrodihardjo (Deputy Governor of Central Java 1985–1990, Chairman of the Central Java Regional House of Representatives 1992–1997, elder brother of Sutiyoso)

== Activities ==
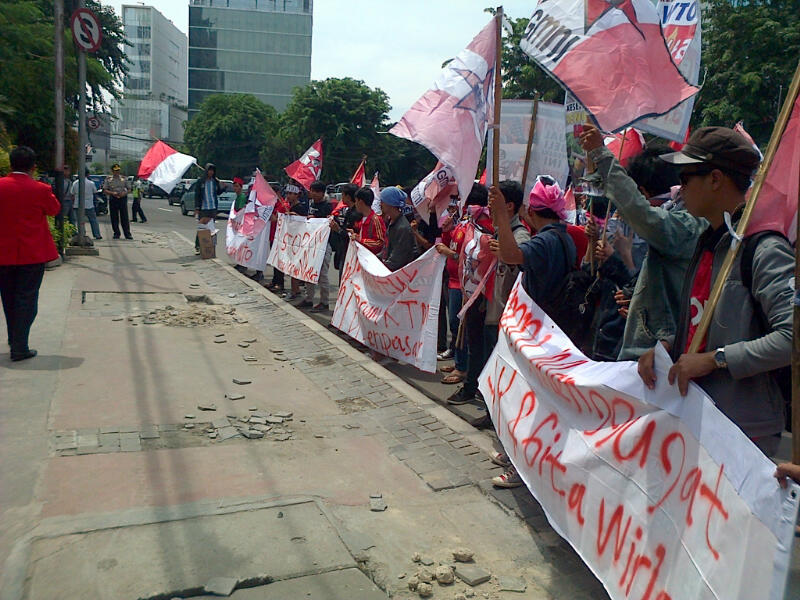
A demonstration by the Presidium (now the Central Leadership Council) of GMNI against the ongoing WTO conference in Bali in 2013.

Some of the activities carried out by GMNI include demonstrations, literacy, cadreisation, and advocacy.

== Bibliography ==
=== Book ===
- Presidium GMNI. Buku Panduan Organisasi. Jakarta: Presidium GMNI. 2013.

=== Journal ===
- Kuswono. "Marhaenism: Social Ideology Create by Soekarno". Jurnal HISTORIA Volume 4, Nomor 2, Tahun 2016. ISSN 2337-4713. Diakses pada 12 November 2019.

=== Web ===
- Arief Hidayat (2017). "Indonesia Negara Ketuhanan" [Indonesia is a Nation based on Belief in God] (PDF). mkri.id (in Indonesian). Constitutional Court of Indonesia.
