= Baharuddin Lopa =

Indonesian Minister of Justice

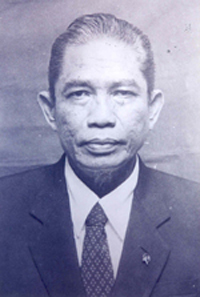
Baharuddin Lopa

Baharuddin Lopa (27 August 1935 – 3 July 2001) was an Indonesian Minister of Justice and Human Rights and later Attorney General of Indonesia.

== Life and career ==
Baharuddin Lopa was born in Polewali Mandar, West Sulawesi, Indonesia on 27 August 1935. He attended Hasanuddin University, majored in law, and graduated in 1962. Lopa then had a lengthy career as an attorney, including services as a district attorney at the State District Attorney Office in Ujung Pandang (1958–1960) and head of the State District Attorney Office in Ternate (1964–1966).

From 1966 to 1976, Lopa led several High District Attorney Offices, first in Southeast Sulawesi (1966–1970), then Aceh (1970–1974), and of Justice and Human Rights and later in West Kalimantan (1974–1976). In 1982, Lopa was appointed head of the High District Attorney Office in South Sulawesi. At the same time, he obtained a doctoral degree in law from the Faculty of Law, Diponegoro University.

Between 1993 and 1998, Lopa was a member of Indonesia's National Commission on Human Rights (Komnas HAM), where he served as secretary general.

During his career as an attorney, Lopa was famous for his tough stance against corruption. On 12 February 2001, Lopa was appointed Minister of Justice and Human Rights by then President Abdurrahman Wahid, replacing Yusril Ihza Mahendra.

On 6 June 2001, while still serving as Justice Minister, Lopa was appointed Attorney General of Indonesia, replacing Marzuki Darusman. He promised to prosecute powerful politicians and tycoons suspected of corruption. He also pledged to bring former president Suharto to trial for misuse of funds. Within less than one month, on 30 June 2001, Lopa fell ill during a flight to Saudi Arabia. He died on 3 July 2001 at the age of 66 in a hospital in Riyadh. The cause of death was listed as heart failure. The Indonesian government refused to request an autopsy, despite speculation that Lopa might have been murdered.
