= Ministry of the State Secretariat =

Government ministry of Indonesia

Ministry of State Secretariat
- Kementerian Sekretariat Negara
- Seal of the Ministry of State Secretariat

Ministry overview
- Formed: 19 August 1945
- Jurisdiction: Government of Indonesia
- Headquarters: 17–18 Veteran Street Central Jakarta 10110 Jakarta, Indonesia; 6.16824349905311°S 106.82331385639614°E
- Minister responsible: Prasetyo Hadi, Minister
- Deputy Ministers responsible: Bambang Eko Suhariyanto, First Deputy Minister; Juri Ardiantoro, Second Deputy Minister
- Website: www.setneg.go.id

The Ministry of State Secretariat (Note: Indonesian: Kementerian Sekretariat Negara, abbreviated as Kemensetneg.) is an Indonesian government ministry responsible for providing technical, administrative, and analytical support to the President and Vice President in the exercise of their state powers. The current minister of the state secretariat is Prasetyo Hadi, who has been in office since 21 October 2024.

== Duties ==
The State Secretariat is responsible for providing technical, administrative, and analytical support to the President and Vice President of Indonesia, the details are which as follow:

1. Providing technical and administrative support for the household, protocols, press, and media affairs of the president;
2. Providing technical and administrative support for the household and protocols of the vice president, as well as vice-presidential analytical support to assist the president;
3. Providing technical and administrative support of the president as the commander-in-chief of the Indonesian National Armed Forces concerning the promotion and dismissal of military officers, awarding of titles and honors, and the provisions on security coordination to the president, vice president, their households, and visiting foreign head of states/head of governments;
4. Providing technical, administrative, and analytical support concerning the drafting of legislations, resolutions of legal issues involving the president and vice president, as well as drafting of presidential decisions for clemency, amnesty, abolition of punishments, legal rehabilitation, remission of life imprisonment conviction into regular imprisonment, citizenships, extraditions, and Indonesian membership in international organizations;
5. Providing technical, administrative, and analytical support concerning inter-institutional relations between state institutions, non-structural institutions, regional institutions, public organizations, political organizations, and managing public complaints to the president, vice president, or the ministers;
6. Providing technical, administrative, and analytical support concerning the promotions, dismissals, and the retirements of state officials, government officials, other officials, and civil servants;
7. Fostering, managing, and developing the bureaucracy, its organization, administration, and reforms, within the Ministry;
8. Coordinating the duties, fostering, and administrative support within the Ministry, as well as the management of presidential archives, facilities for former presidents and vice presidents, and other administrative support for the presidential medical team;
9. Managing state property/wealth within the jurisdiction of the Ministry;
10. Coordinating and facilitating technical cooperation between the Government of Indonesia and various actors of development, as well as the administrative management of official overseas visits;
11. Supervision over duties and responsibilities within the Ministry; and
12. Executing other functions and duties as ordered by the president and vice president, or by law.

== Organization ==
Based on the Presidential Decree No. 148/2024 and No.1/2026, and as expanded by the Minister of the State Secretariat Decree No. 11/2024, the Ministry of the State Secretariat is organized into the following:

- Office of the Minister of the State Secretariat
- Office of the Deputy Minister of the State Secretariat
- Board of Experts
  - Senior Expert to the Minister on Politics, Defense, and Security
  - Senior Expert to the Minister on Maritime Economy, Human Development, and Culture
  - Senior Expert to the Minister on Legal, Human Rights, and Governance
  - Senior Expert to the Minister on State Apparatuses and Bureaucracy Reform
  - Senior Expert to the Minister on Political Communication and Public Relation
- Special Staffs
  - Special Staff to the Minister on Social and Culture
  - Special Staff to the Minister on Laws
  - Special Staff to the Minister on Communication and Media
- Ministry Secretariat
  - Bureau of Planning
  - Bureau of Finance
  - Bureau of Leadership Administration and Supports
    - Division of Leadership Administration and Supports
  - Bureau of International Technical Partnership
  - Bureau of Public Relations
  - Bureau of State Properties Management and Procurement
    - Division of State Properties Management
    - Division of State Properties Administration and Governance
    - Division of Procurement Management
  - Bureau of General Affairs
    - Division of Equipment and Household Affairs
    - Division of Buildings
    - Division of Vehicles
    - Division of Health Service
    - Division of Presidential Doctors Administrative Supports
- Inspectorate
- Presidential Secretariat
  - Presidential Adjutant
    - Assistant of the Presidential Adjutant
  - First Spouse Adjutant
  - Presidential Doctors
  - Deputy for Palace Administration and Management
    - Bureau of Administration
      - Division of Administration and Human Resource Development
      - Division of Presidential Special Advisors
      - Division of Presidential Special Envoys
      - Division of Presidential Special Staffs
    - Bureau of Palace Management
      - Division of Foods and Provisions
      - Division of Palace Management, Art, and Culture
      - Division of Tools and Stationery
      - Division of Environmental Management
    - Bureau of General Affairs
      - Division of Equipment and State Properties
      - Division of Buildings
      - Division of Vehicles
      - Division of Security
    - Bogor Presidential Palace
    - Cipanas Presidential Palace
    - Yogyakarta Presidential Palace
    - Tampaksiring Palace
  - Deputy for Protocol, Press, and Media
    - Bureau of Protocols
      - Division of Events
      - Division of Ceremonies
      - Division of Invitation and Protocolar Administration
      - Division of Travels
    - Bureau of Press, Media, and Information
  - Supporting Deputy for Presidential Strategic Program Affairs
- Vice Presidential Secretariat
  - Vice Presidential Adjutant
  - Second Spouse Adjutant
  - Presidential Doctors for the Vice President
  - Supporting Deputy for Economics, Tourism, and Digital Transformation Policies
    - Assistant Deputy for Economics, Finance, and Digital Transformation
    - Assistant Deputy for Industries, Trade, Tourism, and Creative Economy
    - Assistant Deputy for Infrastructure, Natural Resources, and Regional Development
  - Supporting Deputy for Welfare Improvement and Human Resources Development Policies
    - Assistant Deputy for Poverty Eradication and Village Development
    - Assistant Deputy for Heath, Nutrition, and Family Development
    - Assistant Deputy for Social Empowerment and Disaster Responses
    - Assistant Deputy for Education, Religions, Culture, Youth, and Sports
  - Supporting Deputy for Governance and Development Equity Policies
    - Assistant Deputy for Foreign Affairs and Defense
    - Assistant Deputy for Political, Security, Legal, and Human Rights
    - Assistant Deputy for Governance and Regional Development Acceleration
  - Deputy for Administration
    - Bureau of Administration and Human Resources
      - Division of Administration
      - Supporting Division for the Vice-President Special Staffs
    - Bureau of Planning and Finance
    - Bureau of General Affairs
      - Division of Equipment and State Properties Management
      - Division of Building
      - Division of Vehicle and Internal Security
    - Bureau of Protocols and Household Affairs
      - Division of Protocols
      - Division of Vice-Presidential Palace and Residence
      - Division of Household Affairs
      - Division of Travels
    - Bureau of Press, Media, and Information
- President Military Secretariat
  - Military Adjutant for the President
    - Assistant Military Adjutant for the President
  - Military Adjutant for the Vice President
  - Military Adjutant for the First Spouse
  - Military Adjutant for the Second Spouse
  - Cabinet Secretariat
    - Assistant to the Cabinet Secretary
  - Presidential Doctors
  - Bureau of Indonesian Armed Forces and Indonesian National Police Personnels
    - Division of Promotion and Termination of Indonesian Armed Forces and Indonesian National Police Personnels
    - Division of Fostering and Services for Indonesian Armed Forces and Indonesian National Police Personnels
    - Division of Administration and Data Management
  - Bureau of Security
    - Division of Security Operations
    - Division of Special Investigation and Special Security
    - Division of Security Administration
    - Division of Security and Internal Order
  - Bureau of Titles, Service Decorations, and Honours
    - Verification Division
    - Awarding Division
  - Bureau of General Affairs
    - Division of Administration and State Properties Management
- Cabinet Support Secretariat
  - Deputy for Political, Legal, Security, and Human Rights
    - Assistant Deputy for Political, Domestic Governance, and State Apparatuses
    - Assistant Deputy for Legal, Human Rights, Immigration, and Correction
    - Assistant Deputy for Foreign Affairs, Communication, and Digital Affairs
    - Assistant Deputy for Defense and Security
  - Deputy for Economics
    - Assistant Deputy for Energy, Mineral Resources, and Tourism
    - Assistant Deputy for Manpower, Investment, and Downstreaming
    - Assistant Deputy for Trade and Industry
    - Assistant Deputy for Development Planning, Fiscal, and State-owned Enterprise Development
  - Deputy for Human Development, Culture, and Social Empowerment
    - Assistant Deputy for Health, Population, Youth, and Sports
    - Assistant Deputy for Religions, Culture, Education, Science, and Technology
    - Assistant Deputy for Social Affairs, Migrant Workers, Women, and Child Protection
    - Assistant Deputy for Villages, Disadvantaged Regional Development, Cooperatives, MSMBEs, and Creative Economy
  - Deputy for Foods, Infrastructure, and Regional Development
    - Assistant Deputy for Maritime, Fisheries, and Forestry
    - Assistant Deputy for Agrarian Affairs, Spatial Management, Transmigration, and Environment
    - Assistant Deputy for Public Works, Housing, and Transportation
    - Assistant Deputy for Agriculture, Foods, and Nutrition
  - Deputy for Cabinet Proceedings
    - Assistant Deputy for Proceeding Organizer
    - Assistant Deputy for Proceeding Reporting
    - Assistant Deputy for Papers and Translation
    - Assistant Deputy for Documentation, Dissemination, and Presidential and Ministerial Archives
  - Deputy for Administration
    - Bureau of Budgeting Management, Human Resources, and Performance
    - Bureau of Apparatuses Support and Institutional Affairs
    - Bureau of General Affairs
      - Division of State Properties
      - Division of Household Affairs
      - Division of Maintenance
      - Division of Leadership Administrative Supports
- Deputy of Laws and Legal Administration (Deputy I)
  - Assistant Deputy for Security, Institutional Affairs, and Apparatuses
  - Assistant Deputy for Political, Legal, and Domestic Governance
  - Assistant Deputy for Economics
  - Assistant Deputy for Public Welfare
  - Assistant Deputy for Legal Administration
- Deputy of Institutional Relations and Public Affairs (Deputy II)
  - Assistant Deputy for State and Government Institutional Relations
  - Assistant Deputy for Non-governmental Institutional Relations
  - Assistant Deputy for Public Reporting
  - Assistant Deputy for Strategic Studies and Partnership Management
- Deputy of Apparatuses Administration (Deputy III)
  - Administrative Bureau of State Officials and Administrators
  - Administrative Bureau of Government Officials
  - Bureau of Human Resource
  - Bureau of Organization, Administration, Legal, and Bureaucracy Reform
- Agency for Technology, Data, and Information
  - Center for IT Development and Services
  - Center for Networking System Infrastructure and Cybersecurity
  - Center for Data Management and Digital Transformation
- Centers
  - Center for State Civil Apparatuses Competency Development
  - Center for Translators Fostering
  - Center for Cooperative Analyst

== List of ministers ==
Portrait	Name	Term length		Cabinet	Notes
Portrait	Name	Term start	Term End	Cabinet	Notes
	Abdul Gaffar Pringgodigdo	19 August 1945	14 November 1945	Presidential Cabinet	
					State secretariat function were exercised by the Prime Minister's Office during liberal democracy period in Indonesia.
	Mohammad Ichsan	23 August 1962	25 July 1966	Third Working Cabinet; Fourth Working Cabinet; Dwikora Cabinet; Revised Dwikora Cabinet; Second Revised Dwikora Cabinet	The office were reestablished as 'Minister/State Secretary' (Indonesian: Menteri/Sekretaris Negara).; Both Ichsan and Soerjoadiningrat were made Minister/State Secretary on 23 August 1962.; Ichsan was reappointed Minister/State Secretary on 13 December 1963, while Soerjoadiningrat was made Minister/Cabinet Presidium Secretary. He would be appointed acting Minister/State Secretary around June 1965.; Later during Dwikora Cabinet, the office were renamed as 'State Secretary' (Indonesian: Sekretaris Negara).
	Abdul Wahab Soerjoadiningrat	23 August 1962	13 December 1963	Third Working Cabinet; Fourth Working Cabinet; Dwikora Cabinet; Revised Dwikora Cabinet; Second Revised Dwikora Cabinet	
					State secretariat function were dormant during acting presidency of Soeharto.
	Alamsyah Ratu Perwiranegara	9 February 1968	8 April 1972	Ampera Cabinet; First Development Cabinet	In 1972, Alamsyah was appointed Ambassador to the Netherlands until 1974, where he resigned due to illness.
	Sudharmono	8 April 1972	21 March 1988	First Development Cabinet; Second Development Cabinet; Third Development Cabinet; Fourth Development Cabinet	During Second Development Cabinet, the office were renamed as 'State Minister/State Secretary' (Indonesian: Menteri Negara/Sekretaris Negara).; Since 28 March 1973, the office were merged with the Cabinet Secretary.; In March 1988, Sudharmono was elected Suharto's vice president on his fifth term.
	Murdiono	21 March 1988	14 March 1998	Fifth Development Cabinet; Sixth Development Cabinet	
	Saadilah Mursyid	14 March 1998	21 May 1998	Seventh Development Cabinet	
	Akbar Tanjung	23 May 1998	10 May 1999	Development Reform Cabinet	On 10 May 1999 Akbar Tanjung resigned from his post, as he was elected chairman of Golkar party. State Secretary position was filled ad interim by the Justice Minister, Muladi.
	Muladi (ad interim)	10 May 1999	20 October 1999	Development Reform Cabinet	On 10 May 1999 Akbar Tanjung resigned from his post, as he was elected chairman of Golkar party. State Secretary position was filled ad interim by the Justice Minister, Muladi.
	Alirahman	29 October 1999	15 February 2000	National Unity Cabinet	Since 29 October 1999 the office were renamed as 'State Secretary' (Indonesian: Sekretaris Negara).; The office of Cabinet Secretary were separated, with the appointment of Marsilam Simanjuntak and later Marzuki Darusman as Cabinet Secretary during National Unity cabinet.; According to the biography of Djohan Effendi, both he and Marsilam Simanjuntak (the Cabinet Secretary) decided to separate their responsibilities: State Secretariat for the president's role as head of state, Cabinet Secretary for the president's role as head of government.
	Bondan Gunawan	15 February 2000	29 May 2000	National Unity Cabinet	
	Djohan Effendi	29 May 2000	21 June 2001	National Unity Cabinet	
	Muhammad Maftuh Basyuni	21 June 2001	23 July 2001	National Unity Cabinet	
	Bambang Kesowo	10 August 2001	20 October 2004	Mutual Assistance Cabinet	The office of State Secretary and Cabinet Secretary were merged again during Mutual Assistance Cabinet.
	Yusril Ihza Mahendra	21 October 2004	9 May 2007	First United Indonesia Cabinet	Since 21 October 2004, the office were renamed as ''Minister of State Secretariat' (Indonesian: Menteri Sekretaris Negara). The name has remained since.; The office of Cabinet Secretary were separated again, with the appointment of Sudi Silalahi as Cabinet Secretary during First United Indonesia cabinet. The two offices has remained separate since.
	Hatta Rajasa	9 May 2007	20 October 2009	First United Indonesia Cabinet	Since 21 October 2004, the office were renamed as ''Minister of State Secretariat' (Indonesian: Menteri Sekretaris Negara). The name has remained since.; The office of Cabinet Secretary were separated again, with the appointment of Sudi Silalahi as Cabinet Secretary during First United Indonesia cabinet. The two offices has remained separate since.
	Sudi Silalahi	22 October 2009	20 October 2014	Second United Indonesia Cabinet	
	Pratikno	27 October 2014	20 October 2024	Working Cabinet; Onward Indonesia Cabinet	
	Prasetyo Hadi	21 October 2024	incumbent	Red and White Cabinet	The office of State Secretary and Cabinet Secretary were merged again during the Red and White Cabinet.; The Cabinet Secretary became a subordinate office of the State Secretary.

== See also ==
- Government of Indonesia
