= Teddy Indra Wijaya =

Cabinet secretary of Indonesia (born 1989)

Lieutenant Colonel Teddy Indra Wijaya
- Official portrait, 2026

17th Cabinet Secretary of Indonesia
- Incumbent
- Assumed office 21 October 2024
- President: Prabowo Subianto
- Preceded by: Pramono Anung; Pratikno (acting)

Personal details
- Born: 14 April 1989 (age 37) Manado, North Sulawesi, Indonesia
- Party: Independent (2024–present)
- Spouse: Wita Nidia Hanifah (m. 2018; div. 2019)
- Parents: Giyono (father); Patris R.A. Rumbayan (mother)
- Education: Taruna Nusantara Senior High School
- Alma mater: Indonesian Military Academy (BASc); Jenderal Achmad Yani University (BA); University of Indonesia (MA)
- Occupation: Military officer, politician

Military service
- Allegiance: Indonesia
- Branch/service: Indonesian Army
- Years of service: 2011–present
- Rank: Lieutenant Colonel
- Unit: Infantry (Kopassus)
- Service no.: 11110010020489

Teddy Indra Wijaya (born 14 April 1989) also known as Mayor Teddy is an Indonesian military officer and politician who has served as the Cabinet Secretary of Indonesia since October 2024. He also served as the Assistant Aide to President Joko Widodo and Aide to Minister of Defence Prabowo Subianto until October 2024.

== Early life and education ==
Teddy Indra Wijaya was born in Manado, North Sulawesi, Indonesia. He is the only child to Colonel (Retired) Giyono dan Major Patris R. A. Rumbayan. His uncle is Marshal (Retired) Sahrul Ansory, a military officer of Indonesian Air Force.

Teddy attended Taruna Nusantara Senior High School in Magelang, Central Java, Indonesia. He graduated in 2007. Teddy earned his bachelor's degree of Arts in International Relations from General Ahmad Yani University in 2012, and a master's degree of Arts in Terrorism Studies from the University of Indonesia in 2021. His thesis for master's degree was titled "Pengaruh Evolusi Jaringan Teroris Terhadap Efektivitas Kontra-Terorisme Indonesia".

== Military career ==
Teddy was an Indonesian Army cadet officer throughout his early military education. As a cadet, he served as the Kalemustar (chairman of the Cadet Consultation Institute) in the Cadet Corps. He was also active in the Drumband GSCL and represented the Army, Navy, and Air Force Academies as the sole representative at the 13th International Cadet Conference at the National Defence Academy of Japan in 2010. He graduated from Indonesian Military Academy in 2011.

During Teddy's service as a young military officer in the Indonesian Army, he underwent military training both domestically and abroad, including training in Command School, Kopassus on 2012; Anti-Terror Task Force, Kopassus in 2013; Free Fall Jump, Kopassus in 2014; Airborne Guide, Kopassus in 2015; Intelligence School in Australia, circa 2015; attended United States Army Infantry School, United States Army Airborne School and United States Army Air Assault School in 2019; and United States Army Ranger School in 2020. He also received the title of International Honor Graduate, Commandant's List Award, and Gold APFT from the United States Army Air Assault School in 2019.

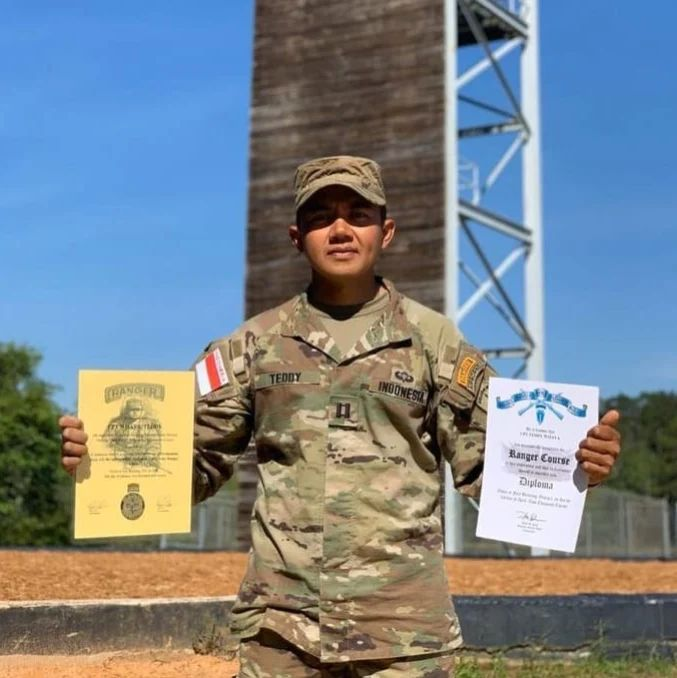
Teddy graduated from U.S. Army Ranger School in 2020

Teddy's career in the Army began as the Commander of Platoon 3, 2, 1 in Kopassus before being appointed as the aide to the chief of staff of the Indonesian National Armed Forces and several other military positions thereafter, including Assistant Aide to President Joko Widodo and Aide to Minister of Defence Prabowo Subianto.

Chief of Army Staff (Kasad) Maruli Simanjuntak briefly reassigned Teddy as Deputy Commander of Infantry Battalion Para Raider 328/Dirgahayu through Kasad Decision No. Kep. 137/II/2024 dated 26 February 2024. However, Wijaya continued to assist Prabowo as aide to the minister of defense before ultimately being appointed by Prabowo as Cabinet Secretary.

== Political career ==
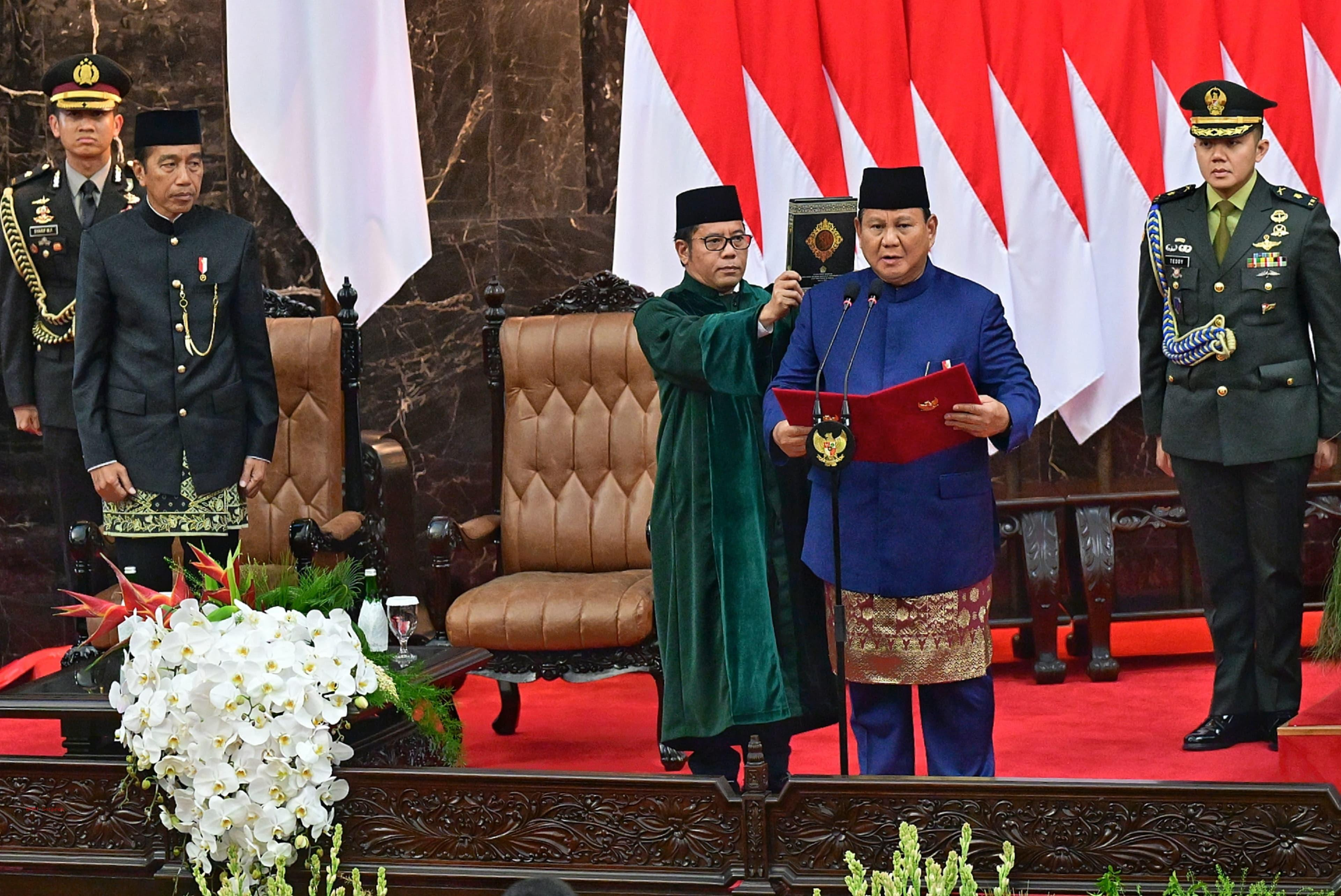
Teddy was behind Prabowo Subianto when he was sworn in as the President of Indonesia on 20 October 2024, acting as Prabowo's temporary aid

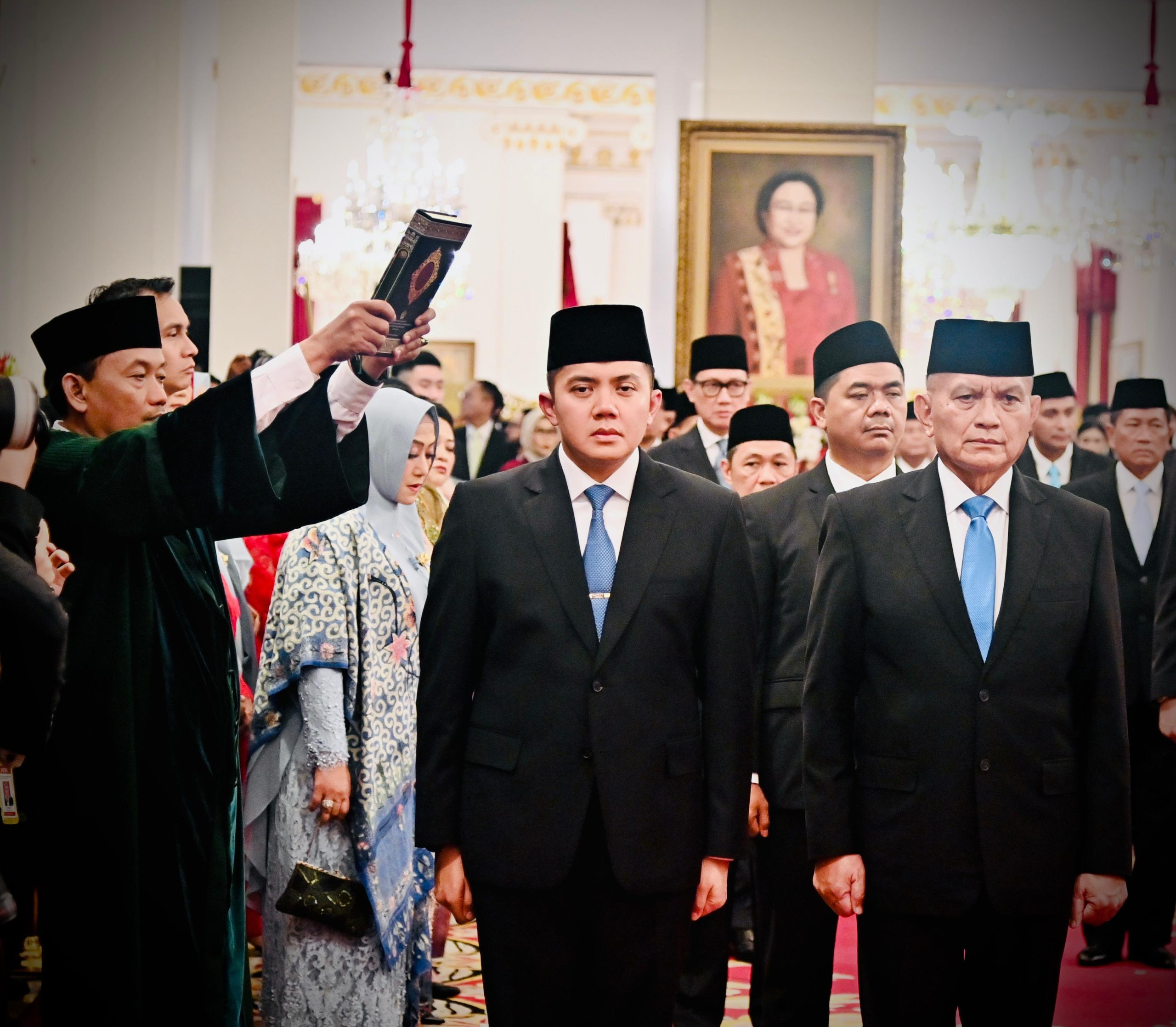
Teddy took an oath as Cabinet Secretary before President Prabowo Subianto in 21 October 2024

In October 2024, Teddy was appointed as the Cabinet Secretary of Indonesia by the President of Indonesia Prabowo Subianto. He is often seen accompanying Prabowo when attending any meetings, whether in the country or abroad. Although he was performing his duties as the cabinet secretary for the Red and White Cabinet, his rank as the military officer was still maintained, causing controversy and debate among political opponents and citizens.

== Controversies and issues ==
=== Dwifungsi and cabinet secretary role in the cabinet ===
His appointment has been viewed by some as part of a broader trend of militarization in Indonesian politics. Opponents claim that the presence of military personnel in high-ranking political positions could threaten civil liberties and democratic norms, as it may lead to an increased influence of the military in civilian affairs. The dual role has also affected public perception of the government. Some citizens express distrust towards a cabinet secretary who is still an active military officer, fearing that military interests may overshadow the needs and rights of the civilian population.

=== Promotion to Lieutenant Colonel ===
Teddy's promotion to Lieutenant Colonel has been mired with controversy and accusations of favoritism due to a contravention with Military Law Number 40/2018 which requires Staff College attendance before a promotion to Lieutenant Colonel. Furthermore, his lack of experience in leading troops in the field due to his role which largely take place as adjutant to President Joko Widodo and later Prabowo Subianto tarnish his credibility among TNI officers, provoking envy.

=== Questions on sexual orientation ===
His proximity and perceived closeness with President Prabowo Subianto often has come under scrutiny, and often prompted many in the public to speculate the nature of this relationship, some even suggesting that Teddy is in a romantic relationship with the president, fueled by his perceived flamboyant behavior and the president's divorced and unmarried status. On 6 May 2026, Amien Rais, former Speaker of the People's Consultative Assembly and founder of the Ummah Party posted a YouTube video urging the president to distance himself from Teddy on the basis of him allegedly being a homosexual, the video was then quickly removed on the platform by the request of the Indonesian Ministry of Communication and Digital Affairs, prompting a controversy and fueling more speculation. Teddy and the Minister of Communication and Digital Affairs Meutya Hafid denied the allegations and defended the removal by stating that the accusations amounted to libel and contained hate speech and slander towards the president.

== Personal life ==
Teddy married Wita Nidia Hanifah (born 30 March 1994), a consultant and entrepreneur on 11 September 2018. However, Wita filed for a divorce which was made official on 14 August 2019.

== Honours and awards ==
=== National honours ===
- Star of Mahaputera, 3rd class (2025)
- Military Long Service Medal, 8 Years
- Satyalancana Ksatria Yudha
- Medal for National Defense Service
- Medal for Presidential and Vice Presidential Guards Personnel
- Medal for Police Duty in Remote Regions

=== International awards ===
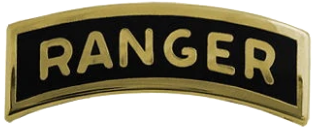
- Ranger tab (US Army)
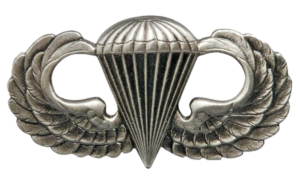
- Basic Parachutist Badge (US Army)
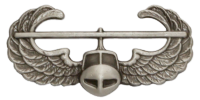
- Air Assault Badge (US Army)

== See also ==
- Prabowo Subianto
