= Prasetyo Hadi =

Indonesian politician (born 1979)

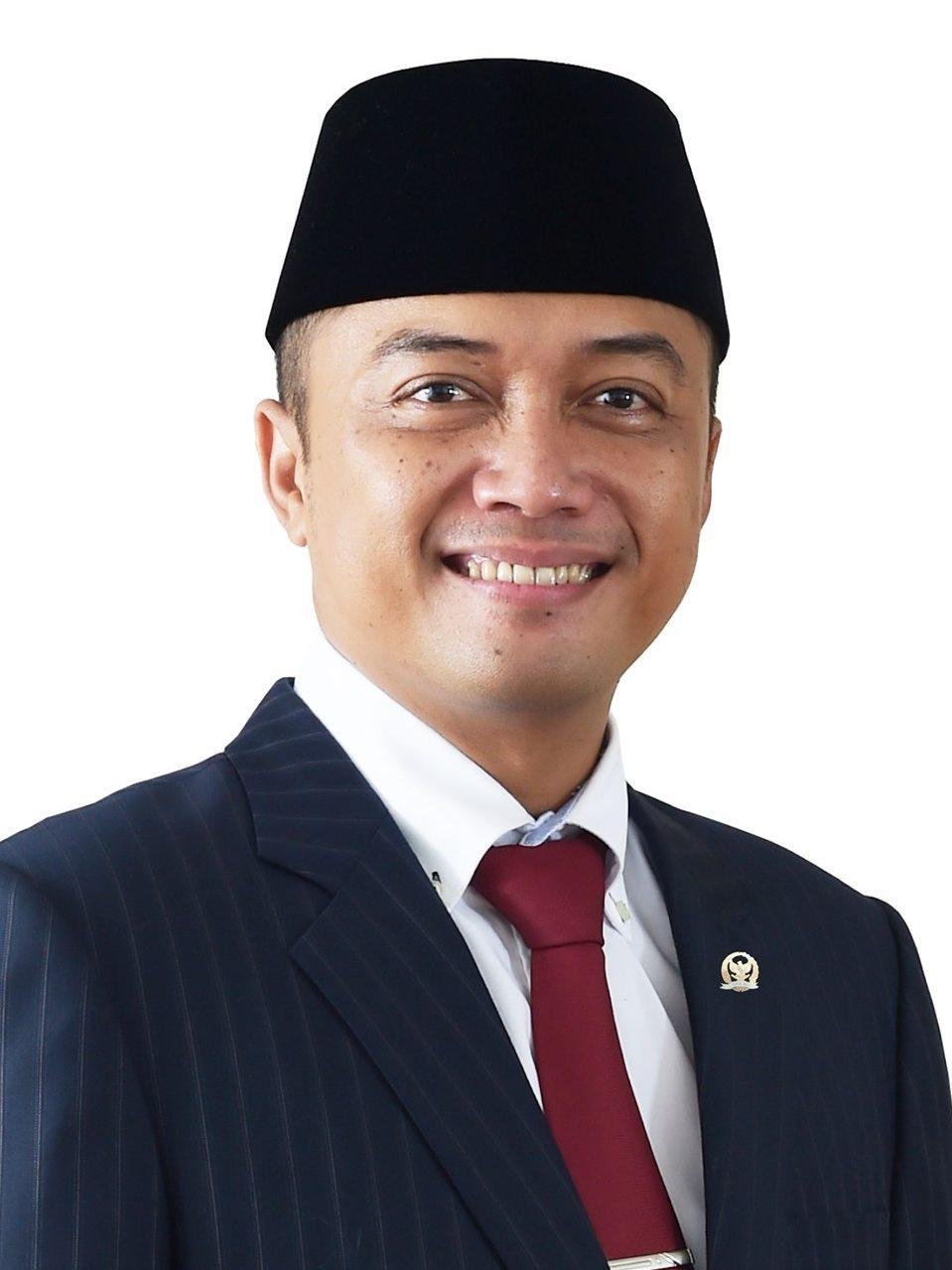

18th Secretary of State of Indonesia
- Incumbent
- Assumed office 21 October 2024
- President: Prabowo Subianto
- Deputy: Bambang Eko Suhariyanto; Juri Ardiantoro
- Preceded by: Pratikno

11th Spokesperson for the President
- Incumbent
- Assumed office 17 April 2025
- President: Prabowo Subianto
- Preceded by: Hasan Nasbi

Member of the House of Representatives
- In office 1 September 2020 – 21 October 2024
- Preceded by: Harry Poernomo
- Succeeded by: Azis Subekti
- Constituency: Central Java VI

Personal details
- Born: 28 October 1979 (age 46) Ngawi, Indonesia
- Party: Gerindra Party
- Spouse: Wahyu Fibriyanti (m. 2010)
- Children: 2
- Education: Gadjah Mada University (S.Hut.)

Prasetyo Hadi (born 28 October 1979) is an Indonesian politician of the Gerindra Party serving as minister of state secretariat since 2024. From 2020 to 2024, he was a member of the House of Representatives.

== Career ==
=== 2019 Legislative Election ===
In the 2019 general election, Hadi ran as a legislative candidate for the Gerindra Party in the Central Java VI electoral district. He did not secure a seat, finishing with the second-highest number of votes within his party, behind the more senior incumbent, Harry Poernomo.

=== Entry into Parliament ===
In early 2020, Harry Poernomo resigned from his position in the House of Representatives. Officials from the Gerindra Party stated that Poernomo had received a new assignment directly from Prabowo Subianto.

In accordance with Indonesian election law, the vacant seat was filled through an inter-term replacement (Pergantian Antarwaktu or PAW). As the candidate with the next-largest vote total from the same party and electoral district, Prasetyo Hadi was inaugurated to fill the remainder of the 2019–2024 term. Upon entering parliament, he was assigned to Commission II, which oversees home affairs, state secretariat, and election administration.

=== Presidential Transition Team ===
In July 2024, following Prabowo Subianto's victory in the presidential election, Hadi was named a member of the Prabowo-Gibran Synchronization Task Force. This high-profile committee, consisting of key advisors, was responsible for ensuring a smooth transfer of power from the outgoing administration of President Joko Widodo.

=== Minister of State Secretariat ===
On October 21, 2024, Prasetyo Hadi was officially appointed as the Minister of State Secretariat (Menteri Sekretaris Negara) in President Prabowo Subianto's inaugural cabinet.

== Personal life ==
Hadi is married to Wahyu Fibriyanti. She serves as an Advisor to the Dharma Wanita Persatuan (DWP), the official association for the wives of Indonesian civil servants, within the Ministry of the State Secretariat (Kementerian Sekretariat Negara). They have two children.
