= Gunawan Wirosaroyo =

Indonesian politician (died 2021)

Gunawan Wirosaroyo (1946/1947 – January 23, 2021) was an Indonesian politician who served as a member of the People's Consultative Assembly for two consecutive terms from 1999 to 2004 and again from 2004 until 2009. He was also the chairman of the DPP PDIP from 2000 to 2005.

Wirosaroyo died of an illness at Kasih Ibu Hospital in Karanganyar, Karanganyar Regency, Central Java, on January 23, 2021, at the age of 74. He tested negative for COVID-19. Gunawan Wirosaroyo was survived by his wife, Sriyunti, three children, and seven grandchildren.
