= Malam Sambat Kaban =

Indonesian politician

Malem Sambat Kaban
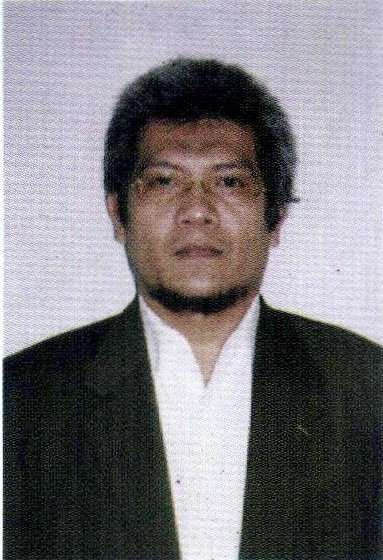

Chairman of the Crescent Star Party (PBB)
- In office 1 May 2005 – 25 April 2015
- Preceded by: Yusril Ihza Mahendra
- Succeeded by: Yusril Ihza Mahendra

Minister of Forestry
- In office 21 October 2004 – 22 October 2009
- President: Susilo Bambang Yudhoyono
- Preceded by: Muhammad Prakosa
- Succeeded by: Zulkifli Hasan

Personal details
- Born: 5 August 1958 (age 67) Binjai, Indonesia
- Spouse: Nurmala Dewi
- Children: 7

Malem Sambat Kaban (born 5 August 1958), also known as M. S. Kaban, is an ex-minister of forestry in Indonesia.

== Politics ==
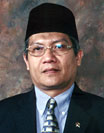
Kaban as Minister of Forestry (2004)

Kaban was a member of the People's Representative Council. He was a Crescent Star Party official before President Susilo Bambang Yudhoyono appointed him as Forestry Minister. In addition, he has been involved in human resource development at Jakarta Public Relations. He examined the potential of economic damage from the creation of Gunung Leuser National Park in 1992.

He was Chairman of the Economic Potential Weak research team in 1993, and a researcher at the Child Exploitation Strategy assessment study of the joint venture company Pertamina in 1994.

He entered politics before the 1997 elections. The United Development Party sought to nominate him as a candidate from West Java. He declined, but the initial reform period under Yusril Ihza Mahendra formed the Crescent Star Party, which emphasized the importance of Islamic law.

Political offices
Preceded by M Prakosa	Indonesia Minister of Forestry; 2004–2009	Succeeded by Zulkifli Hasan
Preceded by Yusril Ihza Mahendra	Chairman of the Crescent Star Party; 2005–2015	Succeeded by Yusril Ihza Mahendra
