= Bambang Kesowo =

Bureaucrat and politician

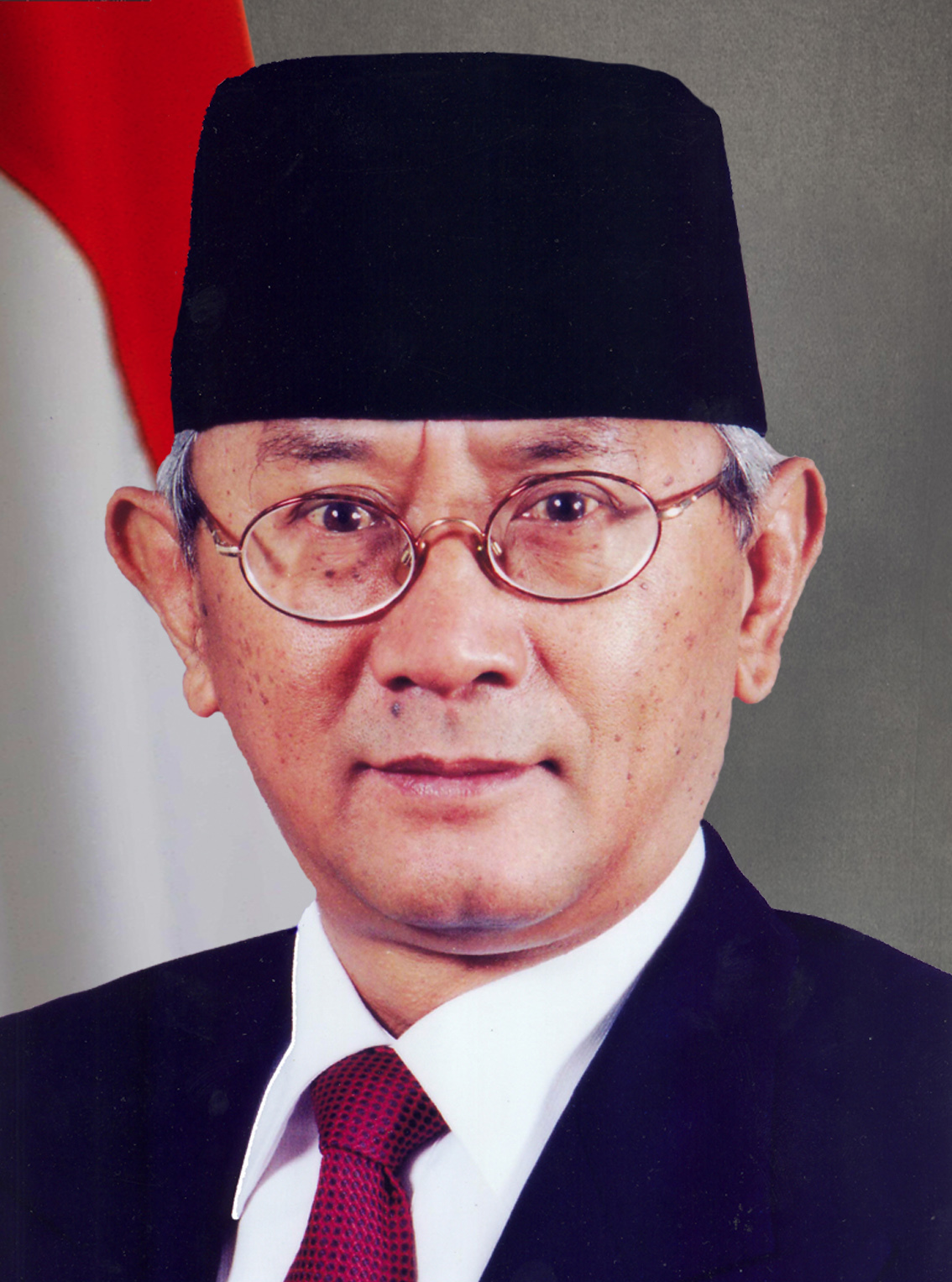

Member of National Research and Innovation Agency Steering Committee
- Incumbent
- Assumed office 13 October 2021
- President: Joko Widodo
- Head of Steering Committee: Megawati Soekarnoputri

Member of National Committee on Innovation
- In office 2010–2014
- President: Susilo Bambang Yudhoyono
- Chair: Muhammad Zuhal

Minister of State Secretariat
- In office 10 August 2001 – 20 October 2004
- President: Megawati Soekarnoputri
- Preceded by: Djohan Effendi
- Succeeded by: Yusril Ihza Mahendra

Personal details
- Born: March 27, 1945 (age 81) Sragen, Central Java, Japanese occupation of the Dutch East Indies
- Party: Independent
- Spouse: Nurien Fatimah
- Children: Oktarini Lestari Eko Hastuti; Arie Pratiwi Handayani; Arief Wicaksono
- Education: Gadjah Mada University; Harvard Law School
- Occupation: Retired Bureaucrat and Politician

Bambang Kesowo is a retired bureaucrat and politician. He is known for being a few of Indonesian state bureaucrats to have risen from a lowest rank (Analyst) to the Minister of a ministry in continuous way and not a political party member to reaching his way to Ministership.

== Early life and education ==
Bambang was graduated from Faculty of Law, Gadjah Mada University in 1968. During his time as Gadjah Mada student, he was active in Indonesian National Student Movement (Indonesian: Gerakan Mahasiswa Nasional Indonesia) a nationalist-marhaenist student organization. He later took Master of Law specializing in Laws in Intellectual Property Rights from Harvard Law School (graduated in 1983). He took his doctorate in 1999 and obtained Doctor of Law from Gadjah Mada University in 2005.

== Careers ==
After graduated from Gadjah Mada, he become an Analyst at Bureau of Analyst and Formulation of Law at State Secretariat in 1968. He later risen to the rank of Deputy Assistant of Law, Assistant to the State Secretariat in Governmental Affairs (1973), Deputy Assistant of General Affairs, Assistant to the State Secretariat in Governmental Affairs (1976), Deputy Assistant of General Affairs, Assistant to the State Secretariat in Governmental Affairs and Non-Department Agencies (1979), Head of State Secretariat, Bureau of Legal Affairs and Formulation of Law (1983–1994), Vice Cabinet Secretary (1993–1998), Secretary of Vice President (1999–2001), and finally Minister of State Secretary (2001–2004).

His mastery in intellectual property rights made him as high-level negotiators and representative from Indonesia government with various International Organizations such as WIPO and United Nations, during his time in State Secretariat.

== Political Relation ==
He supported Megawati Soekarnoputri, despite hailed from high rank officials of Suharto Administration and Suharto Administration stance against her. He is pro democracy. He also left legacy to democracy in Indonesia by drafting Government in Lieu of Law No. 2/1998 which ensure Freedom of Speech in Public.

== Post-Ministerial Careers ==
After no longer become minister, he retired. His expert opinion was crucial for advising People's Representative Council in making of Omnibus Law on Job Creation.

He supported National Research and Innovation Agency (BRIN) formation. On 13 October 2021, he appointed as Member of BRIN Steering Committee by Joko Widodo, recalled him from his long retirement to government work.
