= Bondan Gunawan =

Indonesian politician (1948–2019)

Bondan Gunawan (24 April 1948 in Yogyakarta – 23 May 2019 in Jakarta) was an Indonesian politician who served as Minister of State Secretariat in 2000.
