= Muladi (politician) =

Indonesian academic, judge, and politician (1943–2020)

Prof. Dr. H. Muladi S.H.
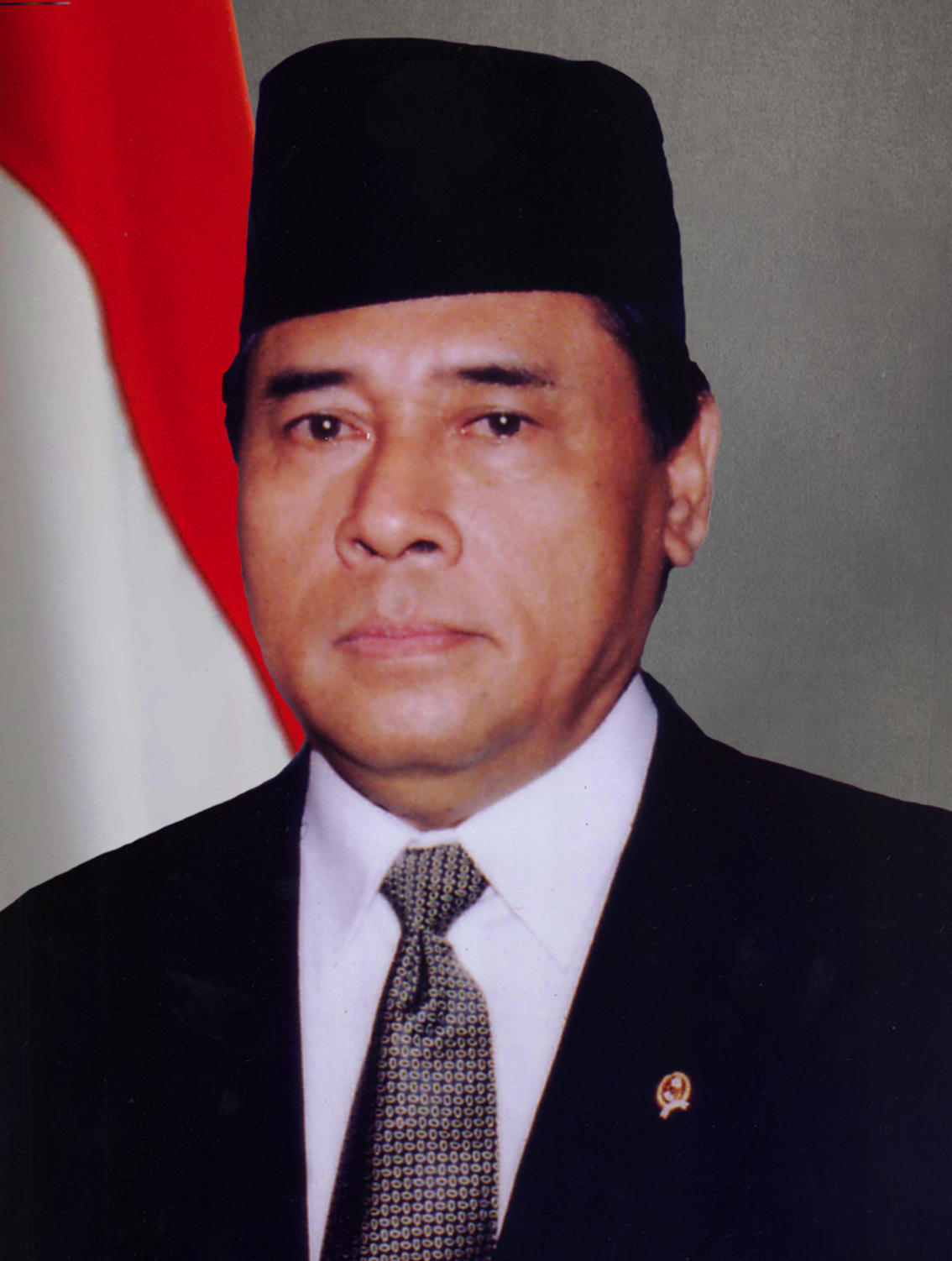

Minister of State Secretary (acting)
- In office 10 May 1999 – 20 October 1999
- President: Baharuddin Jusuf Habibie
- Preceded by: Akbar Tandjung
- Succeeded by: Alirahman

Minister of Justice
- In office 14 March 1998 – 20 October 1999
- President: Suharto; Baharuddin Jusuf Habibie
- Preceded by: Oetojo Oesman
- Succeeded by: Yusril Ihza Mahendra

Personal details
- Born: 26 May 1943 Surakarta, Japanese Dutch East Indies
- Died: 31 December 2020 (aged 77) Jakarta, Indonesia
- Party: Golkar
- Spouse: Nany Ratna Asmara
- Children: 4
- Education: Diponegoro University; International Institute of Human Rights; Padjadjaran University

Muladi (26 May 1943 – 31 December 2020) was an Indonesian academic, judge, and politician who served as the Rector of the Diponegoro University and Minister of Justice in the Seventh Development Cabinet and Development Reform Cabinet.

== Early life and education ==
Muladi was born in Surakarta on 26 May 1943 as the youngest son of Dasijo Darmo Soewito and Sartini. His father, who came from East Java, was a police officer. Muladi moved to Semarang following his father's transfer to the city. Muladi was considered naughty during his childhood and consequently experienced grade retention in elementary and junior high school.

Despite failing to graduate from junior high school, Muladi went on to attend a private high school, the Indonesian Institute High School. After completing high school, he studied law and societal studies at Diponegoro University.

At university, Muladi was an active member of the Indonesian National Student Movement. He also joined the Students' Regiment, a student paramilitary organization. He worked for OPS Oil and Gas Company from 1966 until 1969.

== Academic career ==
After he graduated from the university, Muladi taught as a docent at Diponegoro University since 1986. Muladi taught as a docent for eight years until he was appointed the Rector of the Diponegoro University on 13 April 1994. He still held the rectorate during his tenure as a member of the People's Consultative Assembly and Minister of Justice. He was relieved of the rectorate on 19 May 1998 when he was replaced by Professor Eko Budihardjo.

== Political career ==
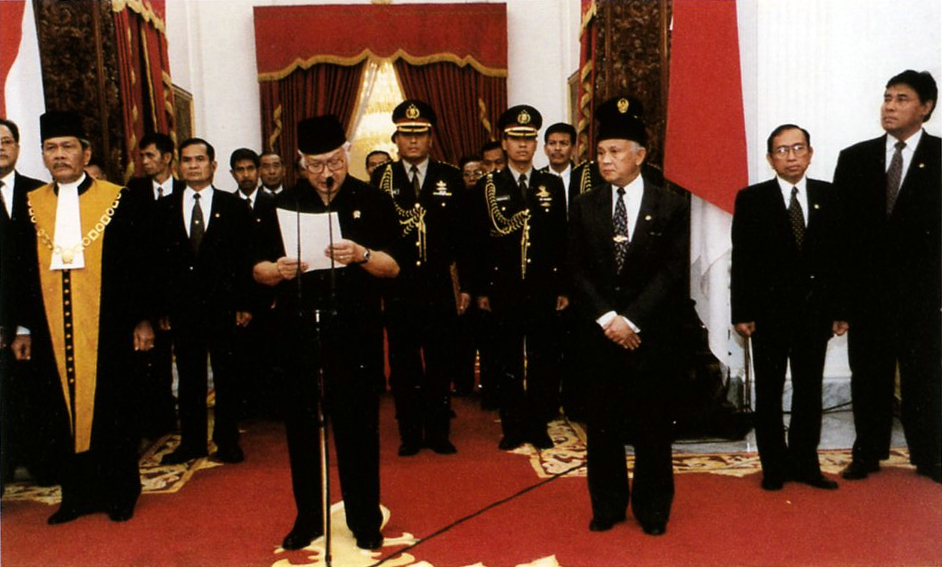
Suharto reads his address of resignation at Merdeka Palace on 21 May 1998. Muladi could be seen at the far right side.

Muladi began his political career when he was appointed the Regional Delegate to the People's Consultative Assembly on 1 October 1997. A year later, Muladi was appointed the Minister of Justice in Suharto's seventh and last cabinet on 14 March 1998. The cabinet lasted for only two months, as Suharto later resigned on 21 May 1998.

Habibie, Suharto's vice president, replaced him as a president. Habibie then formed a new cabinet, in which Muladi served again as Minister of Justice. Habibie's cabinet was formed on 23 May 1998 and was dissolved on 20 October 1999 following his impeachment and resignation as president.

From 10 May until 20 October 1999, Muladi served as an ad-interim Minister of State Secretary. The previous officeholder, Akbar Tandjung, resigned from his office to campaign for Golkar in the 1999 Indonesian legislative election.

== Personal life ==
On 22 March 1964, Muladi married his younger classmate, Nany Ratna Asmara. The marriage resulted in four children, namely Rina Irawanti, Diah Sulistyani, Aida Fitriani, dan Erlina Kumala Esti.

== Death ==
Muladi tested positive for COVID-19 on 17 December 2020 and was treated at Gatot Soebroto Army Hospital. He died at the hospital at 6.45 a.m. on 31 December 2020.

== Awards ==
Muladi received the following awards:

- Dwija Sista from the Department of Defence and Security (1991)
- Man of the Year from Suara Merdeka Daily (1995)
- Civil Service Long Service Medal, 2nd class (1995)
- Star of Mahaputera, 1st class (1999)
- The Best Alumni of Diponegoro University (2003)
- National Police Meritorious Service Star, 1st class (2006)

Political offices
Preceded by Akbar Tandjung	State Secretary of Indonesia; 1999	Succeeded by Yusril Ihza Mahendra
