= Crescent Star Party (Indonesia) =

Political party in Indonesia

Crescent Star Party Partai Bulan Bintang
- Abbreviation: PBB
- General Chairman: Gugum Ridho Putra
- Secretary-General: Yuri Kemal Fadlullah
- Founders: Yusril Ihza Mahendra; Ismail Suny; Nuddin Lubis; Anwar Harjono; Sholeh Iskandar
- Founded: 17 July 1998; 28 years ago
- Preceded by: Masyumi
- Headquarters: Pasar Minggu, South Jakarta, Jakarta
- Youth wing: Crescent Star Youth; Crescent Star Hizbullah Brigade (de facto paramilitary)
- Women's wing: Muslimat Bulan Bintang (Crescent Star Muslim Women)
- Ideology: Pancasila; Conservatism; Islamic democracy Islamic modernism (Indonesia); Religious nationalism Historical: Islamism
- Political position: Centre-right to right-wing
- National affiliation: Advanced Indonesia Coalition (2023–present); Onward Indonesia Coalition (2015–2023); Red-White Coalition (2014–2015); Central Axis (1999–2004)
- Ballot number: 13
- DPR seats: 0 / 580
- DPRD I seats: 12 / 2,372
- DPRD II seats: 164 / 17,510

Website
- partaibulanbintang.or.id

The Crescent Star Party (Indonesian: Partai Bulan Bintang, PBB) is a conservative political party in Indonesia based on Islam and Muslim modern values. The party is also the successor party to Masyumi which was successful during the liberal democracy era in Indonesia. The party was founded on July 17, 1998.

== History ==
The party's origins go back to the banning of the Islamic Masyumi Party by Sukarno in 1960. After the ban, supporters and followers of the party established the Crescent Star Family (Keluarga Bulan Bintang) to continue to press for the implementation of Sharia law and Islamic teaching in Indonesia. Following the fall of Sukarno and the transition to the New Order in which Suharto came to power, members of the organization wanted to revive the Masyumi Party, but this was not allowed by the new regime. In the 1970s, in a meeting in Malang, a new party called Parmusi (Partai Muslimin Indonesia, Muslim Party of Indonesia) was formed. It came fourth in the 1971 legislative elections. In 1973, the party was forced to merge with other Islamic parties into the United Development Party. With the fall of Suharto in 1998, supporters of Masyumi decided to establish a new party. The original plan was to use Masyumi name again, but after consideration, they settled on the name "Crescent Star Party". The party's first leader was Yusril Ihza Mahendra, a lawyer and former speechwriter for President Suharto.

== Electoral record ==
The party stood in the 1999 elections, winning 1.9% of the vote and 13 seats in the People's Representative Council. Yusril was appointed justice and law minister. In mid-2000 internal conflict broke out in the party over Yusril's acceptance of financial assistance from former president Jusuf Habibie. It ended with party member Hartono Mardjono establishing a rival Crescent Star Party. After losing a court case, Hartono then established he Indonesian Islamic Party (Partai Islam Indonesia), but this failed to qualify for the 2004 elections. In these elections, the Crescent Star Party won 2.6% of the popular vote and 11 seats. Yusril was later replaced by Malem Sambat Kaban. In the 2009 legislative election, the party won 1.8 percent of the votes, less than the 2.5 percent electoral threshold, meaning it lost all its seats in the People's Representative Council.

After losing its national parliament seats in the 2009 election, the party never regained its national prominence, only winning 1.46% of the national vote in the 2014 elections, 0.79% in 2019, and 0.32% in 2024, placing it 16th out of the 18 political parties participating in the 2024 elections.

== Party platform ==
The Crescent Star Party aims to realise an Islamic way of life. Its mission is to build a society and nation that is developed, highly independent, intelligent, just, and democratic, playing a role in fostering world peace based on the values of Islam.

== Leaders ==
| No. | Name | Constituency / title | Term of office | | Image | Election results |
| No. | Name | Constituency / title | Took office | Left office | Image | Election results |
General Chair of the Crescent Star Party (1998–present)
| 1 | Yusril Ihza Mahendra (born 1956) | Rep for West Java | 23 June 1998 | 9 April 2005 | | 1998 Unopposed |
| 2 | Malem Sambat Kaban (born 1958) | Minister of Forestry | 1 May 2005 | 26 April 2015 | | 2005 Malem Sambat Kaban – 283; Hamdan Zoelva – 61; Sahar L. Hassan – 47 2010 1st round Malem Sambat Kaban – 272; Ali Mochtar Ngabalin – 133; Yusril Ihza Mahendra – 25; Sahar L. Hassan – 24; Fuad Amsari – 4 Yusron Ihza Mahendra – 1 Muhammad Mawardi – 1 2010 2nd round Malem Sambat Kaban – 325; Ali Mochtar Ngabalin – 123 |
| 3 | Yusril Ihza Mahendra (born 1956) | – | 26 April 2015 | 18 May 2024 | | 2015 Yusril Ihza Mahendra – 386; Rhoma Irama – 122; Wasal Falah – 1 Heppy Tringgono – 2 2020 Unopposed |
| – | Fahri Bachmid (born 1977) Acting | — | 18 May 2024 | 1 March 2025 | | |
| 4 | Gugum Ridho Putra (born 1988) | — | 1 March 2015 | Incumbent | | 2025 Gugum Ridho Putra – 398; Afriansyah Noor – 134 |

== Election results ==
=== Presidential election results ===
| Election | Ballot number | Candidate | Running mate | 1st round (Total votes) | Share of votes | Outcome | 2nd round (Total votes) | Share of votes | Outcome |
|---|---|---|---|---|---|---|---|---|---|
| 2004 | 4 | Susilo Bambang Yudhoyono | Jusuf Kalla | 39,838,184 | 33.57% | **Runoff** | 69,266,350 | 60.62% | Elected |
| 2009 | 2 | Susilo Bambang Yudhoyono | Boediono | 73,874,562 | 60.80% | Elected | | | |
| 2014 | 1 | Prabowo Subianto | Hatta Rajasa | 62,576,444 | 46.85% | Lost | | | |
| 2019 | 1 | Joko Widodo | Ma'ruf Amin | 85,607,362 | 55.50% | Elected | | | |
| 2024 | 2 | Prabowo Subianto | Gibran Rakabuming Raka | 96,214,691 | 58.59% | Elected | | | |

Note: Bold text indicates the party member

=== Legislative election results ===
| Election | Ballot number | Leader | Seats | | Total votes | Share of votes | Status |
| Election | Ballot number | Leader | No. | ± | Total votes | Share of votes | Status |
|---|---|---|---|---|---|---|---|
| 1999 | 22 | Yusril Ihza Mahendra | 13 / 462 | | 2,049,708 | 1.94% | Governing coalition |
| 2004 | 3 | Yusril Ihza Mahendra | 11 / 550 | ▼2 | 2,970,487 | 2.62% | Governing coalition |
| 2009 | 27 | Malam Sambat Kaban | 0 / 560 | ▼11 | 1,864,642 | 1.79% | Governing coalition |
| 2014 | 14 | Malam Sambat Kaban | 0 / 560 | 0 | 1,825,750 | 1.46% | Opposition (until 2018) |
| 2014 | 14 | Malam Sambat Kaban | 0 / 560 | 0 | 1,825,750 | 1.46% | Governing coalition (from 2018) |
| 2019 | 19 | Yusril Ihza Mahendra | 0 / 575 | 0 | 1,099,848 | 0.79% | Governing coalition |
| 2024 | 13 | Yusril Ihza Mahendra | 0 / 580 | 0 | 484,487 | 0.32% | Governing coalition |

Election results for Provincial Regional Houses of Representatives
| Election | Province | Seats won | Status | Reference |
|---|---|---|---|---|
| 2024 | Bangka Belitung | 1 / 45 | Opposition | |
| 2024 | West Nusa Tenggara | 2 / 65 | Governing coalition | |
| 2024 | Central Sulawesi | 1 / 55 | Governing coalition | |
| 2024 | Southeast Sulawesi | 4 / 45 | Opposition | |
| 2024 | North Maluku | 1 / 45 | Opposition | |
| 2024 | Central Papua | 2 / 56 | Governing coalition | |
| 2024 | Highland Papua | 1 / 56 | Opposition | |

== See also ==
- List of Islamic political parties
