= Sudi Silalahi =

Indonesian politician (1949–2021)

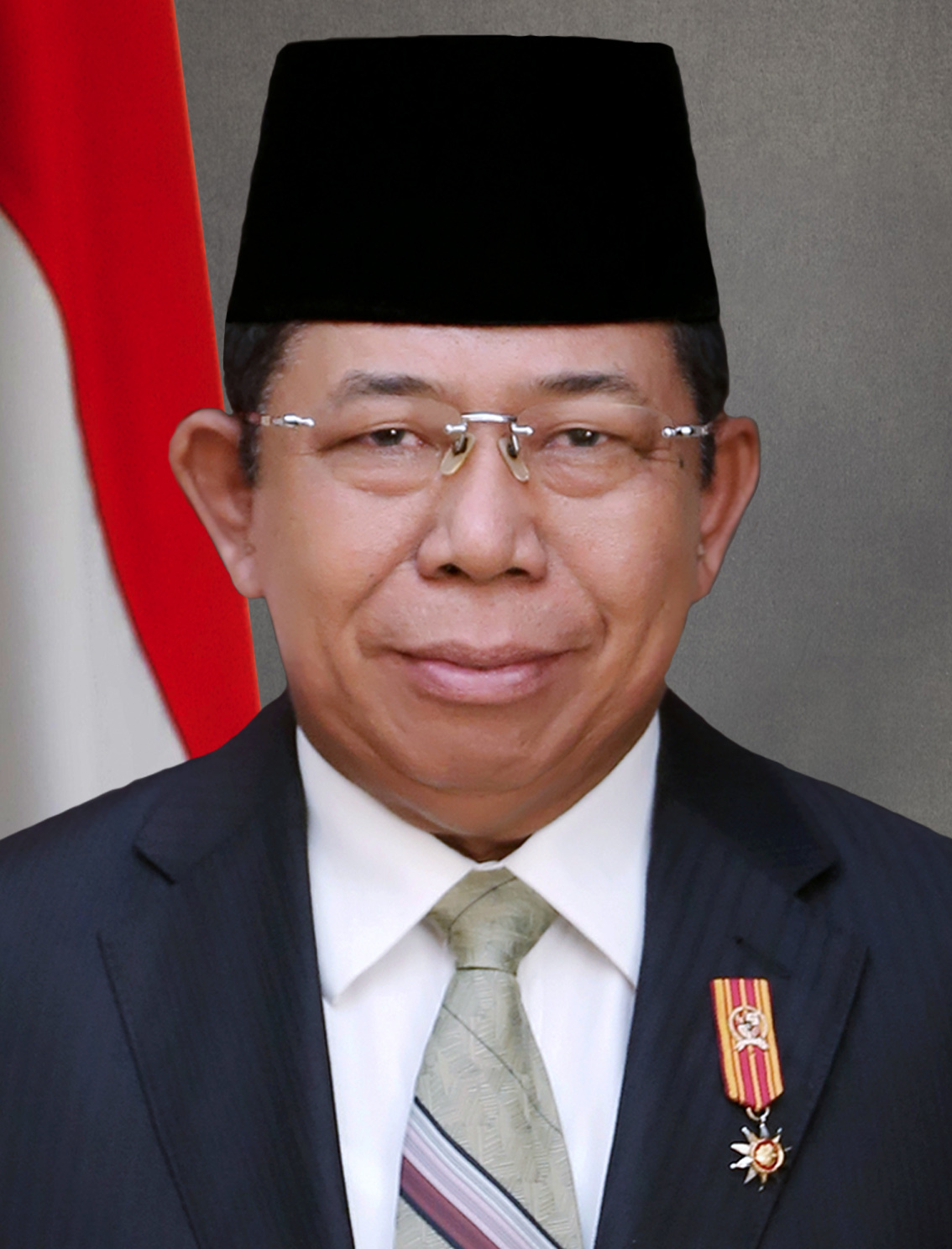
Sudi Silalahi

Sudi Silalahi (13 July 1949 – 25 October 2021) was an Indonesian politician and Indonesian army Lieutenant General. He was the Secretary of State of the Republic of Indonesia from 22 October 2009 to 20 October 2014. He was also the secretary of Susilo Bambang Yudhoyono when Yudhoyono was serving as Coordinating Minister for Political and Security Affairs under the administration of Megawati Soekarnoputri.

In 2012, he was part of the State visit of President Susilo Bambang Yudhoyono to the United Kingdom. He was appointed an Honorary Knight Commander of the Order of St Michael and St George. He was born in Pematangsiantar, Indonesia.

Silalahi died on 25 October 2021, aged 72, after a sudden stomach pain while having a morning walk. He was buried the following day in the Kalibata Heroes' Cemetery in South Jakarta. The senior Coordinating Minister for Political, Legal, and Security Affairs, Mahfud MD, led the group of mourners which included Susilo Bambang Yudhoyono (the sixth president of Indonesia) and his son Agus Harimurti Yudhoyono (General Secretary of Democratic Party, Boediono and Jusuf Kalla (both former vice-presidents of Indonesia), and several ministers who served during the period of the Yudhoyono administration).
