= Yusril Ihza Mahendra =

Indonesian lawyer, politician and academic

- Yusril Ihza Mahendra in 2024

Coordinating Minister for Legal, Human Rights, Immigration, and Correction
- Incumbent
- Assumed office 21 October 2024
- President: Prabowo Subianto
- Deputy: Otto Hasibuan
- Preceded by: Position established

Minister of Justice and Human Rights
- In office 9 August 2001 – 20 October 2004
- President: Megawati Sukarnoputri
- Preceded by: Mahfud MD
- Succeeded by: Hamid Awaluddin
- In office 29 October 1999 – 7 February 2001
- President: Abdurrahman Wahid
- Preceded by: Muladi
- Succeeded by: Baharuddin Lopa

State Secretary of Indonesia
- In office 21 October 2004 – 8 May 2007
- President: Susilo Bambang Yudhoyono
- Preceded by: Bambang Kesowo
- Succeeded by: Hatta Rajasa

Leader of the Crescent Star Party
- In office 26 April 2015 – 18 May 2024
- Preceded by: Malam Sambat Kaban
- Succeeded by: Fahri Bachmid
- In office 1998 – 1 May 2005
- Preceded by: Position established
- Succeeded by: Malam Sambat Kaban

Personal details
- Born: 5 February 1956 (age 70) Manggar, Belitung, Indonesia
- Party: PBB
- Spouses: Kessy Sukaesih (m. 1983; div. 2005) Rika Tolentino Kato (m. 2005)
- Children: 6
- Parents: Idris Haji Zainal Abidin (father); Nursiha Sandon (mother)
- Relatives: Yusron Ihza Mahendra (brother); Yuslih Ihza Mahendra (brother)
- Education: University of Indonesia; University of the Punjab; Universiti Sains Malaysia
- Occupation: Lawyer; politician; academist

Yusril Ihza Mahendra (born 5 February 1956) is an Indonesian lawyer, politician and academic, who served as the leader of the Crescent Star Party (PBB) from 2015 to 2024. He is the current Coordinating Minister for Legal, Human Rights, Immigration, and Correction in President Prabowo Subianto's Red and White Cabinet. Previously, he served as the leader of the PBB from 1998 until 2005, Minister of Justice and Human Rights from 1999 until 2004 (as Minister of Justice from 1999-2001 and as Minister of Law and Human Rights from 2001-2004), and member of the People's Representative Council in 1999.

Born on 5 February 1956, he attended the University of Indonesia. He graduated with a Bachelor's Degree in Philosophy and a Bachelor's Degree in Constitutional Law. He would go on to work as a speechwriter for presidents Suharto and B. J. Habibie. He founded the PBB in 1998, and was later elected a member of the People's Representative Council in the 1999 legislative elections, and was subsequently appointed Minister of Justice and Human Rights in 2001 by president Megawati Sukarnoputri. He served as minister until 2004, when he became the State Secretary of Indonesia, going on to serve from 2004 until 2007.

Yusril is married with Rika Tolentino Kato and they have two children, Ishmael Zacharias Mahendra and Anissa Zulaikha Mahendra. Previously he was married to Kessy Sukaesih, and they have four children. He divorced Sukaesih in November 2005.

== Early life, family, and education ==
=== Early life and family ===
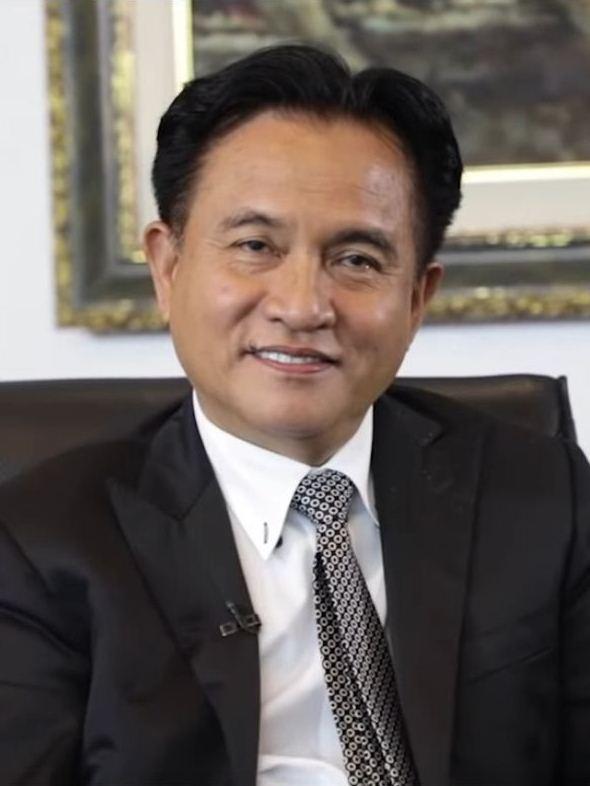
Yusril Ihza Mahendra in 2019

Yusril Ihza Mahendra was born in Manggar, Belitung, on 5 February 1956. His father was Idris Haji Zainal and his mother was Norsiha. His family traced its ancestry from Johor and West Sumatra. His paternal grandfather Haji Thaib from his father's side was a member of the Johore royalty, which likely settled in Belitung from Johor in the 19th century. While his mother was a third generation Minangkabau descendant in Belitung.

=== Education ===
==== Early education ====
He continued the tradition of Malay intellectuals from his family who studied philosophy, religion, law, art and literature. After completing Belitung Islamic College High School, he left Belitung to Jakarta in 1976.

==== University of Indonesia ====
He attended the University of Indonesia (UI), becoming close to his lecturers, Professors Ismail Suny and Osman Raliby. Raliby in particular was previously a member of the Indonesian Constituent Assembly during the 1950s. In turn, Raliby would introduce Mohammad Natsir to Yusril. Natsir was an Islamist politician, former Prime Minister of Indonesia, and Chairman of the Masyumi Party, a major Muslim Party that had rivaled Indonesian Communist Party (PKI) in the 1950s.

During his time in UI he lived in Jakarta by lodging at various mosques in the city. He also took on part-time work to fund his studies. He tutored children in reading the Quran, taught martial arts, and sold fish and coconuts. In 1982, Yusril graduated with a Bachelor's Degree in Philosophy and followed it up the next year with a Bachelor's Degree in Governance.

==== Further education ====
Following this he became a lecturer at the Muhammadiyah University in Jakarta (UMJ), and at the Socialization Skills Academy in the Ministry of Justice. In the meantime, Yusril attended postgraduate studies. Yusril then went to Pakistan to attend the University of Punjab. In 1984, Yusril graduated with a Master's Degree in Humanities and Social Science. When he returned to Indonesia, Yusril became a lecturer for University of Indonesia (UI) and UMJ. At UI, Yusril was involved in the law faculty and taught postgraduate courses. In 1993, Yusril graduated from the University of Science, Malaysia and became a Doctor of Philosophy.

== Early career ==
=== Islamic organizations ===
Mahendra also began to involve himself in organizational activities. From 1981 to 1982 he was vice-chair of the Indonesian Youth Mosque Communication Body. Yusril's Islamist views meant that his scope was not just limited to the academic world. In 1996, Yusril became a member of the Central Committee of the Indonesian Islamic Da'wah Council (DDII). At the same time, he became Chairman of the Legal Department of the Jakarta Branch of the Union of Indonesian Intellectual Muslims (ICMI) while serving as Vice Chairman of the ICMI Council of Experts.

=== Employment with Suharto ===
In 1996 he was employed by President Suharto as a speechwriter. Yusril would go on to write 204 speeches for Suharto. When Suharto was re-elected to his final term as President in March 1998, he was appointed Aide to the Assistant of the State Secretary. From this position, he was closely involved in the final moments of Suharto's Presidency. When Suharto resigned, Yusril was involved in the drafting of the resignation speech, giving input so that the speech was legally accurate. During the crucial moments, Yusril managed to have a disagreement with Suharto over the speech. Suharto wanted to declare that the cabinet was now disbanded while Yusril argued that the cabinet would not be disbanded because it will continue under the leadership of the next President. Suharto then personally made the necessary edits. When all was set, Yusril went to see Amien Rais to inform him that Suharto was resigning. The next morning on 21 May 1998, Suharto announced his resignation.

== Political career ==
=== Crescent Star Party ===
With Suharto's fall from power, opportunity opened up for Yusril to get himself into politics and air his views. As a politician, Yusril was very much influenced by Natsir and called for the Jakarta Charter to be included in the Constitution. In the 1945 Constitution, Article 29 Section 1 originally read "The State is based on the belief in God with the obligation to obey Sharia law for its adherers". However, the Section was edited to "The State is based on the belief in God" to make it sound more secular.

To achieve his political goal, Yusril formed the Crescent Star Party (PBB) on 17 July 1998 and was elected as its first chairman. In June 1999, PBB participated in the 1999 Legislative Elections and came 6th with 2.84% of the votes. In the lead up to the People's Consultative Assembly (MPR) General Session, PBB joined forces with the other Muslim Parties to form the Central Axis. As the MPR assembled in 1999, the Central Axis had their support behind National Awakening Party's Abdurrahman Wahid with their opponents being Golkar's President Habibie and the Indonesian Democratic Party-Struggle's (PDI-P) Megawati Sukarnoputri. When Habibie's accountability speech was not accepted, he refused to run and the Presidential race came down to Wahid and Megawati. Yusril, perhaps worried that Wahid might also drop out of the race had himself nominated as a Presidential Candidate. However, Yusril would drop out of the race with little time to spare before the election process and Wahid would emerge as the President.

=== Presidency of Abdurrahman Wahid ===
When Wahid named his national unity cabinet, Yusril was appointed to the position of Minister of Laws and Legislations. During the Wahid presidency, Yusril had a major policy difference when Wahid threw up the idea of lifting the ban on Marxism–Leninism. Yusril responded by threatening to resign from his position. A threat that was widely supported by PBB. Nevertheless, Wahid's idea never materialized and despite his differences, Yusril was retained as minister. When political pressure began to put Wahid on the defensive in early 2001, Yusril suggested during a cabinet meeting that Wahid resign. Wahid's response was to remove Yusril from the cabinet.

=== Presidency of Megawati ===
Now out of the cabinet, Yusril and PBB threw their weight behind all the other political parties planning to impeach Wahid through a MPR Special Session. This was achieved in July 2001 when the MPR unanimously impeached Wahid and elected Megawati to the presidency. In Megawati's cabinet, Yusril was appointed to the position of Minister of Justice and Human Rights. As Minister of Justice and Human Rights, Yusril worked on the Anti-Terrorism Bill (Which would become the Anti-Terrorism Act) after the 2002 Bali bombings. Yusril also sought to improve the quality of Judges in Indonesia.

=== 2004 Presidential elections ===
As 2004 approached, Yusril's name began to emerge as a presidential candidate. Yusril said that he was ready to run, provided that PBB finished in the Top 3 in the Legislative Elections. PBB failed to do this, gaining only 2% of the votes in the Legislative Elections. Yusril finally decided to support Susilo Bambang Yudhoyono and Jusuf Kalla in their bid for the Presidency and the Vice Presidency. For his support, Yusril was rewarded with the position of State Secretary.

=== Presidency of Yudhoyono ===
In 2005, Yusril was replaced as PBB chairman by MS Kaban but became the chair of PBB's Advisory Council. He was later reelected into that position on 26 April 2015. On 7 May 2007, Yusril was replaced as State Secretary by Hatta Rajasa.

== See also ==
- Crescent Star Party

Political offices
Preceded by Muladi	Minister of Law and Legislation; 1999–2001	Succeeded by Baharuddin Lopa
Preceded by Mahfud MD	Minister of Justice and Human Rights; 2001–2004	Succeeded by Hamid Awaluddin
Preceded by Bambang Kesowo	State Secretary; 2004–2007	Succeeded by Hatta Rajasa
Party political offices
New title	Chairman of the Crescent Star Party; 1998–2005	Succeeded by Malam Sambat Kaban
Preceded by Malam Sambat Kaban	Chairman of the Crescent Star Party; 2015–present	Incumbent
