= Minister of State Owned Enterprises (Indonesia) =

Former Indonesian political position

- Menteri Badan Usaha Milik Negara
- Ministerial seal

- Ministerial flag
- Ministry of State Owned Enterprises
- Member of: Cabinet of Indonesia
- Appointer: President of Indonesia
- Formation: 16 March 1998; 28 years ago
- First holder: Tanri Abeng
- Final holder: Dony Oskaria (acting)
- Abolished: 3 October 2025
- Website: bumn.go.id

The Indonesian minister of state-owned enterprises was former political position in the Cabinet of Indonesia. The minister was supported by deputy minister of state owned enterprises. The minister administered the portfolio through the Ministry of State Owned Enterprises.

== List of ministers ==
The following individuals have been appointed Minister of State Owned Enterprises, or any of its precedent titles:

Political party: Independent Golkar PDI-P

No.	Portrait	Name (Birth–Death)	Political party	Title	Took office	Left office	Cabinet
1		Tanri Abeng (1942-2024) (State Minister)	Golkar	State Minister of Utilization of State Owned Enterprises	16 March 1998	21 May 1998	Sevent Development
1		Tanri Abeng (1942-2024) (State Minister)	Golkar	State Minister of Utilization of State Owned Enterprises	23 May 1998	20 October 1999	Development Reform
Merged to State Minister of Investment and Development of State Owned Enterprises					26 October 1999	26 April 2000	National Unity
Since 23 August 2000, post abolished during first reshuffle by President Abdurrahman Wahid.							National Unity
2		Laksamana Sukardi (b. 1956) (State Minister)	PDI-P	State Minister of State Owned Enterprises	10 August 2001	20 October 2004	Mutual Assistance
3		Sugiharto (1955–2021) (State Minister)	Independent	State Minister of State Owned Enterprises	21 October 2004	9 May 2007	First United Indonesia
4		Sofyan Djalil (b. 1953) (State Minister)	Independent	State Minister of State Owned Enterprises	9 May 2007	20 October 2009	First United Indonesia
5		Mustafa Abubakar (b. 1953) (State Minister)	Independent	State Minister of State Owned Enterprises	22 October 2009	19 October 2011	Second United Indonesia
5		Mustafa Abubakar (b. 1953) (State Minister)	Independent	Minister of State Owned Enterprises	22 October 2009	19 October 2011	Second United Indonesia
6		Dahlan Iskan (b. 1951)	Independent	Minister of State Owned Enterprises	19 October 2011	20 October 2014	Second United Indonesia
7		Rini Mariani Soemarno (b. 1958)	Independent	Minister of State Owned Enterprises	27 October 2014	20 October 2019	Working
8		Erick Thohir (b. 1970)	Independent	Minister of State Owned Enterprises	23 October 2019	17 September 2025	Onward Indonesia
8		Erick Thohir (b. 1970)	Independent	Minister of State Owned Enterprises	23 October 2019	17 September 2025	Red White
—		Dony Oskaria	Independent	Acting Minister of State Owned Enterprises	17 September 2025	3 October 2025	Red White

== See also ==
- Ministry of State Owned Enterprises
