= Ministry of Energy and Mineral Resources =

Government ministry of Indonesia

- Kementerian Energi dan Sumber Daya Mineral
- Logo of the Ministry of Energy and Mineral Resources

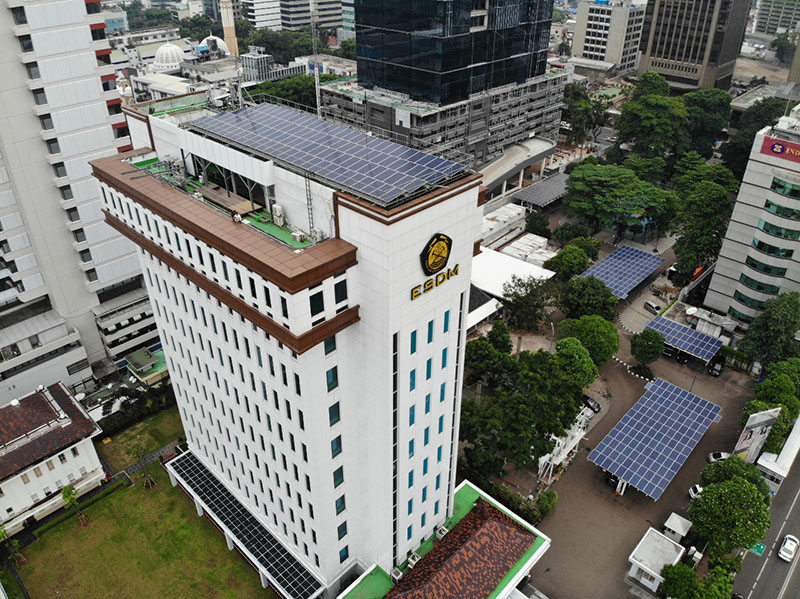
- Ministry of Energy and Mineral Resources headquarters

Agency overview
- Formed: 10 July 1959
- Preceding agency: Ministry of Main Industry and Mining (1959-1966)
- Jurisdiction: Government of Indonesia
- Headquarters: Jalan Medan Merdeka Selatan No. 18 Jakarta Pusat 10110 Jakarta, Indonesia
- Minister responsible: Bahlil Lahadalia, Minister of Energy and Mineral Resources
- Website: www.esdm.go.id

The Ministry of Energy and Mineral Resources of the Republic of Indonesia (Indonesian: Kementerian Energi dan Sumber Daya Mineral Republik Indonesia, abbr. Kementerian ESDM) is an Indonesian ministry responsible for providing assistance to the President and Vice President in performing government's affairs in the field of energy and mineral resources. The current minister is Bahlil Lahadalia.

== History ==
In history before 1945, the first institution that handled mining in Dutch East Indies is Department of Mining (Dienst van den Mijnbouw) Following Japanese occupation of the Dutch East Indies in 1942, the department name was changed to Geological Survey Division (地質調査除, Chisitsu Chosajo), then to Mining and Geology Bureau (Djawatan Tambang dan Geologi) after Proclamation of Indonesian Independence which was formed on 11 September 1945 under the Ministry of Prosperity.

In year 1952 the bureau was under the Ministry of Industry. It was changed to the Mining Directorate which consisted of the Mining Service Center and the Geological Service Center. Following year 1957 the Ministry of Economy was split into the Ministry of Trade and the Ministry of Industry, the centers under the Mining Directorate were changed to the Mining and Geological Services.

The government established the Bureau of Oil and Gas which is under the Ministry of Basic Industry and Mining in 1961. The next year Geology and Mining Bureau was changed to the Geology Directorate and Mining Directorate. Following year 1963 Bureau of Oil and Gas was changed into Directorate of Oil and Gas which is under the authority of the Assistant Minister of Mining and State Mining Companies.

Two years after, in 1965, Department of Basic Industry / Mining is divided into three departments namely: Department of Basic Industry, Department of Mining and Department of Oil and Gas Affairs. In June 1965, Minister of Oil and Gas Affairs stipulates the establishment of the Oil and Gas Institution. In 1966 Department of Oil and Gas Affairs is merged into the Ministry of Mines and Oil and Gas which oversees the Department of Oil and Gas. Im Ampera Cabinet, Department of Oil and Gas and the Department of Mining are merged into the Department of Mining.

Department of Mining changed to the Department of Mines and Energy in the next decade (1978). Department of Mines and Energy turned into the Department of Energy and Mineral Resources in 2000. In 2019 in accordance with Presidential Decree No. 47/2009, the name 'Department' was changed to 'Ministry'.

== Organization Structure ==
Based on Presidential Decree No. 169/2024 and Ministry of Energy and Mineral Resources Decree No. 12/2025, the ministry consisted of:

- Office of the Minister of Energy and Mineral Resources
- Office of the Deputy Minister of Energy and Mineral Resources
- General Secretariat
  - Bureau of Planning
  - Bureau of Organization and Human Resources
  - Bureau of Finance
  - Bureau of Legal Affairs
  - Bureau of General Affairs
  - Bureau of Communications, Public Information Services, and Partnership
  - Bureau of Administration Affairs and Protocols
- General Directorate of Oil and Gas (General Directorate I)
  - General Directorate of Oil and Gas Secretariat
  - Directorate of Program Fostering in Oil and Gas Affairs
  - Directorate of Upstream Business Fostering for Oil and Gas
  - Directorate of Downstream Business Fostering for Oil and Gas
  - Directorate of Planning and Development for Oil and Gas Infrastructures
  - Directorate of Engineering and Environment for Oil and Gas
  - "LEMIGAS" Institute for Oil and Gas Testing, Kebayoran Lama, South Jakarta
    - 47 "LEMIGAS" Laboratories, divided into 6 Testing Divisions:
      - Division of Oil and Gas Exploration Testing
      - Division of Oil and Gas Exploitation Testing
      - Division of Oil Processing Testing
      - Division of Gas Processing Testing
      - Division of Product Application Testing
      - Division of Technoeconomic and Businesses and Services Development
    - Division of Preparation and Testing Infrastructure (Central Calibration and Maintenance Laboratory)
- General Directorate of Electricity (General Directorate II)
  - General Directorate of Electricity Secretariat
  - Directorate of Program Fostering in Electricity Affairs
  - Directorate of Business Fostering for Electricity
  - Directorate of Engineering and Environment for Electricity
  - Institute for Survey and Testing of Electricity, New and Renewable Energy, and Energy Conservation, Bogor
    - Division of Electricity Testing
    - Division of New and Renewable Energy Survey, Mapping, and Testing
    - Division of Energy Conservation and Environmental Testing
    - Division of Surveying Infrastructure and Testing Laboratories Management
    - Division of Technoeconomic and Services Development
- General Directorate of Minerals and Coal (General Directorate III)
  - General Directorate of Minerals and Coal Secretariat
  - Directorate of Program Fostering in Minerals and Coal Affairs
  - Directorate of Business Fostering for Minerals
  - Directorate of Business Fostering for Coal
  - Directorate of Minerals and Coal Revenue
  - Directorate of Engineering and Environment for Mineral and Coal
  - "tekMIRA" Institute for Minerals and Coal Testing, Bandung
    - Division of Testing Laboratories Management and Services Development
    - Division of Mineral and Coal Testing
    - Division of Mineral Processing and Purification Testing
    - Division of Coal Products Development Testing and Coal Utilization
- General Directorate of New, Renewable Energy, and Energy Conservation (General Directorate IV)
  - General Directorate of New, Renewable Energy, and Energy Conservation Secretariat
  - Directorate of Geothermal
  - Directorate of Bioenergy
  - Directorate of New Energy
  - Directorate of Renewable Energy
  - Directorate of Energy Conservation
- General Directorate of Energy and Mineral Resources Law Enforcement (General Directorate V)
  - General Directorate of Energy and Mineral Resources Law Enforcement
  - Directorate of Energy and Mineral Resources Crime Prevention, Intelligence, and Complaints Handling
  - Directorate of Criminal Prosecution
  - Directorate of Dispute Resolution and Administrative Sanctions
  - Directorate of Evidence Handling
- General Inspectorate
  - General Inspectorate Secretariat
  - Inspectorate I
  - Inspectorate II
  - Inspectorate III
  - Inspectorate IV
  - Inspectorate V
- Geological Agency
  - Center for Minerals, Coal, and Geothermal Resources, Bandung
  - Center for Vulcanology and Geological Disaster Management, Bandung
    - Research and Technological Development Center for Geological Disasters, Yogyakarta
    - Center for Volcanoes Monitoring and Mass Wasting Disasters Mitigation in Sulawesi and Maluku, Manado
    - Center for Volcanoes Monitoring and Mass Wasting Disasters Mitigation in Nusa Tenggara, Ende
  - Center for Groundwater and Spatial Geology Management, Bandung
    - Center for Groundwater Conservation, Ancol, North Jakarta
  - Center for Geological Survey, Bandung
  - Geological Museum, Bandung
  - Institute for Marine Geological Survey and Mapping, Bandung
    - Division of Marine Geological Resources Survey and Mapping
    - Division of Maritime Disaster Mitigation and Maritime Territorial Survey and Mapping
    - Division of Facilities and Infrastructures Management
    - Division of Services Development and Technoeconomic
- Human Resources Development Agency for Energy and Mineral Resources
  - Human Resources Development Center for Oil and Gas, Cepu, Blora
  - Human Resources Development Center for Geology, Minerals, and Coal, Bandung
  - Human Resources Development Center for Electricity, New and Renewable Energies, and Energy Conservation, Ciracas, East Jakarta
  - Human Resources Development Center for the Ministerial Apparatuses, Bandung
  - "AKAMIGAS" Polytechnics of Energy and Mineral, Cepu, Blora
  - Education and Training Center for Underground Mining, Sawahlunto
  - Bandung Polytechnics of Energy and Mining, Bandung
- Centers
  - Center for Energy and Mineral Resources Data, Technology, and Information
  - Center for State Assets Management
  - Center for Energy and Mineral Resources Strategic Policies
- Expert Staff
  - Expert Staff for Strategic Planning
  - Expert Staff for Interinstitutional Relationship
  - Expert Staff for Economy and Natural Resources
  - Expert Staff for Environment and Spatial Planning

== List of ministers ==
No.	Portrait	Minister	Took office	Left office	Time in office	Party	Cabinet
1	Chaerul Saleh	Chaerul Saleh; Minister of Basic Industry and Mining (1959–1964); Minister of Oil and Natural Gas (1964–1966)	9 July 1959	22 February 1966	5 years, 49 days	Murba	Working I (9 July 1959 – 18 February 1960); Working II (18 February 1960 – 6 March 1962); Working III (6 March 1962 – 13 November 1963); Working III (13 November 1963 – 27 August 1964); Dwikora I (27 August 1964 – 22 February 1966)
2	Armunanto	Armunanto; Minister of Mining	27 August 1964	27 March 1966	1 year, 212 days	Independent	Dwikora I (27 August 1964 – 22 February 1966); Dwikora II (22 February 1966 – 27 March 1966)
3	Ibnu Sutowo	Ibnu Sutowo; Minister of Oil and Natural Gas	22 February 1966	25 July 1966	149 days	Independent	Dwikora II (22 February 1966 – 27 March 1966); Dwikora III (31 March 1966 – 25 July 1966)
4	Slamet Bratanata	Slamet Bratanata; Minister of Mining	28 July 1966	11 October 1967	1 year, 75 days	Independent	Ampera I (28 July 1966 – 11 October 1967)
5	Soemantri Brodjonegoro	Soemantri Brodjonegoro; Minister of Mining	17 November 1967	28 March 1973	5 years, 131 days	Independent	Ampera II (17 November 1967 – 10 June 1968); Development I (10 June 1968 – 28 March 1973)
6	Mohammad Sadli	Mohammad Sadli; Minister of Mining	28 March 1973	29 March 1978	5 years, 1 day	Independent	Development II (28 March 1973 – 29 March 1978)
7	Soebroto	Soebroto; Minister of Mining and Energy	31 March 1978	21 March 1988	9 years, 356 days	Golongan Karya	Development III (31 March 1978 – 19 March 1983); Development IV (19 March 1983 – 21 March 1988)
8	Ginandjar Kartasasmita	Ginandjar Kartasasmita; Minister of Mining and Energy	23 March 1988	17 March 1993	4 years, 359 days	Golongan Karya	Development V (23 March 1988 – 17 March 1993)
9	Ida Bagus Sudjana	Ida Bagus Sudjana; Minister of Mining and Energy	17 March 1993	14 March 1998	4 years, 362 days	Golongan Karya	Development VI (17 March 1993 – 14 March 1998)
10	Kuntoro Mangkusubroto	Kuntoro Mangkusubroto; Minister of Mining and Energy	14 March 1998	20 October 1999	1 years, 118 days	Golongan Karya	Development VII (14 March 1998 – 21 May 1998); Development Reform (23 May 1998 – 20 October 1999)
11	Susilo Bambang Yudhoyono	Susilo Bambang Yudhoyono; Minister of Mining and Energy	29 October 1999	23 August 2000	302 days	Independent	National Unity (26 October 1999 – 23 July 2001)
12	Purnomo Yusgiantoro	Purnomo Yusgiantoro; Minister of Energy and Mineral Resources	23 August 2000	20 October 2009	9 years, 40 days	Independent	National Unity (26 October 1999 – 23 July 2001); Mutual Assistance (10 August 1998 – 20 October 2004); United Indonesia I (21 October 2004 – 20 October 2009)
13	Darwin Zahedy Saleh	Darwin Zahedy Saleh; Minister of Energy and Mineral Resources	22 October 2009	19 October 2011	1 year, 362 days	Demokrat	United Indonesia II (22 October 2009 – 20 October 2014)
14	Jero Wacik	Jero Wacik; Minister of Energy and Mineral Resources	19 October 2011	5 September 2014	2 years, 321 days	Demokrat	United Indonesia II (22 October 2009 – 20 October 2014)
—	Chairul Tanjung	Chairul Tanjung; Acting; Minister of Energy and Mineral Resources	11 September 2014	20 October 2014	39 days	Independent	United Indonesia II (22 October 2009 – 20 October 2014)
15	Sudirman Said	Sudirman Said; Minister of Energy and Mineral Resources	27 October 2014	27 July 2016	1 year, 274 days	Independent	Working (27 October 2014 – 20 October 2019)
16	Arcandra Tahar	Arcandra Tahar; Minister of Energy and Mineral Resources	27 July 2016	15 August 2016	19 days	Independent	Working (27 October 2014 – 20 October 2019)
—	Luhut Binsar Panjaitan	Luhut Binsar Panjaitan; Acting; Minister of Energy and Mineral Resources	15 August 2016	14 October 2016	60 days	Golongan Karya	Working (27 October 2014 – 20 October 2019)
17	Ignasius Jonan	Ignasius Jonan; Minister of Energy and Mineral Resources	14 October 2016	20 October 2019	3 years, 6 days	Independent	Working (27 October 2014 – 20 October 2019)
18	Arifin Tasrif	Arifin Tasrif; Minister of Energy and Mineral Resources	23 October 2019	19 August 2024	4 years, 301 days	Independent	Onward Indonesia (23 October 2019 – present)
19	Bahlil Lahadalia	Bahlil Lahadalia; Minister of Energy and Mineral Resources	19 August 2024	incumbent	2 years, 3 days	Golongan Karya	Onward Indonesia (19 August 2024 – present)

== See also ==
- Government of Indonesia
