= First United Indonesia Cabinet =

Indonesian government cabinet (2004–2009)

First United Indonesia Cabinet Kabinet Indonesia Bersatu I
- 38th Cabinet of Indonesia
- 2004–2009
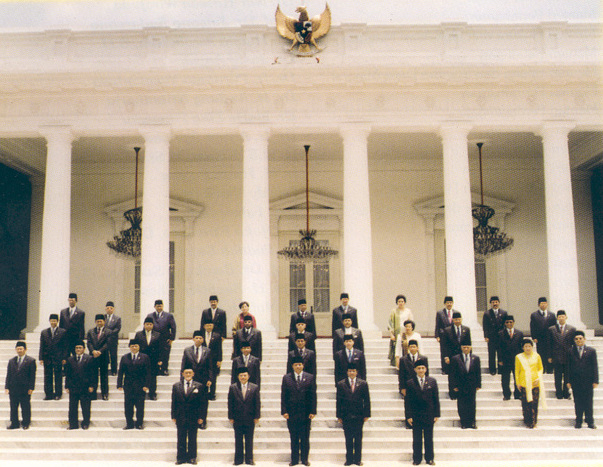
- President Susilo Bambang Yudhoyono (front row, centre) with the newly-elected cabinet in front of the Istana Merdeka, 21 October 2004
- Date formed: 21 October 2004
- Date dissolved: 20 October 2009

People and organisations
- President: Susilo Bambang Yudhoyono
- Vice President: Jusuf Kalla
- No. of ministers: 34
- Member parties: People's Coalition; Demokrat; PKB; PAN; PPP; PBB; PBR; PKS; PKP; Golkar; Independent
- Status in legislature: Majority coalition 417 / 550
- Opposition parties: National Coalition: PDI-P; PDS; United Democratic Nationhood Party; Pelopor; PKPB
- Opposition leader: Megawati Soekarnoputri (de facto main opposition leader)

History
- Election: 2004 Indonesian presidential election
- Predecessor: Mutual Assistance Cabinet
- Successor: United Indonesia II Cabinet

The First United Indonesia Cabinet (Indonesian: Kabinet Indonesia Bersatu I), formerly the United Indonesia Cabinet (Indonesian: Kabinet Indonesia Bersatu), was the official name of the presidential cabinet of Indonesia, led by President Susilo Bambang Yudhoyono during his first period in office from 2004 until 2009. It consisted of ministers, secretaries and an attorney general. They were sworn in on 21 October 2004 for a term of office until 2009. The cabinet was reshuffled twice, on 7 December 2005 and 9 May 2007.

== Cabinet lineup ==
Lineup of the United Indonesia Cabinet when it was created (21 October 2004), the first reshuffle (7 December 2005), and the second reshuffle (9 May 2007):

President	Vice President
Susilo Bambang Yudhoyono	Jusuf Kalla

Position	Effective		
Position	21 October 2004	7 December 2005	9 May 2007
=== Coordinating ministers ===
Coordinating Minister for Political, Legal, and Security Affairs	Widodo Adi Sutjipto		
Coordinating Minister for Economic Affairs	Aburizal Bakrie	Boediono	Boediono (until May 2008); Sri Mulyani (acting)
Coordinating Minister for People's Welfare	Alwi Shihab	Aburizal Bakrie	
State Secretary Minister	Yusril Ihza Mahendra		Hatta Rajasa
=== Departmental ministers ===
Minister of Foreign Affairs	Hassan Wirajuda		
Minister of Home Affairs	M. Ma'ruf		Mardiyanto (29-08-2007)
Minister of Defense	Juwono Sudarsono		
Minister of Law and Human Rights	Hamid Awaluddin		Andi Mattalata
Minister of Trade	Mari Elka Pangestu		
Minister of Industry	Andung Nitimihardja	Fahmi Idris	
Minister of Energy and Natural Resources	Purnomo Yusgiantoro		
Minister of Finance	Jusuf Anwar	Sri Mulyani	
Minister of Forestry	Malam Sambat Kaban		
Minister of Agriculture	Anton Apriantono		
Minister of Health	Siti Fadilah Supari		
Minister of Public Works	Djoko Kirmanto		
Minister of Social Services	Bachtiar Chamsyah		
Minister of National Education	Bambang Sudibyo		
Minister of Religious Affairs	M. Maftuh Basyuni		
Minister of Maritime Affairs and Fisheries	Freddy Numberi		
Minister of Transportation	Hatta Rajasa		Jusman Syafii Djamal
Minister of Labor and Transmigration	Fahmi Idris	Erman Suparno	
Minister of Culture and Tourism	Jero Wacik		
Minister of Communication and Information	Sofyan Djalil		Mohammad Nuh
=== State ministers ===
State Minister for Cooperatives and Small and Medium Enterprises	Suryadharma Ali		
State Minister of Environment	Rachmat Witoelar		
State Minister for Research and Technology	Kusmayanto Kadiman		
State Minister for State Apparatus Utilization	Taufik Effendy		
State Minister for Women's Empowerment	Meuthia Hatta Swasono		
State Minister for Acceleration of Development in Underdeveloped Regions	Saifullah Yusuf		Mohammad Lukman Edy
State Minister for Youth and Sports Affairs	Adhyaksa Dault		
State Minister for State Enterprises	Sugiharto		Sofyan Djalil
State Minister for National Development Planning and Chairperson of the National Development Planning Agency (Bappenas)	Sri Mulyani	Paskah Suzetta	
State Minister for Public Housing	Muhammad Yusuf Asy'ari		
=== Non-ministerial posts ===
Attorney General	Abdul Rahman Saleh		Hendarman Supandji
Cabinet Secretary	Sudi Silalahi		
Commander of the Indonesian National Armed Forces	Air Chief Marshal Djoko Suyanto		General Djoko Santoso
Chief of the Indonesian National Police	General Sutanto		General Bambang Hendarso Danuri
Governor of Bank Indonesia	Burhanuddin Abdullah		Boediono (until May 2009); Darmin Nasution (acting)

== Reshuffles ==
The first reshuffle, announced on 7 December 2007 resulted in the following changes:

Three new ministers: 1. Boediono (Coordinating Minister for the Economy); 2. Paskah Suzetta (State Minister for National Development Planning and Chairperson of the National Development Planning Agency); 3. Erman Soeparno (Minister of Labor and Transmigration)	Three ministers that were rotated to a different office: 1. Aburizal Bakrie (Coordinating Minister for People's Welfare, previously Coordinating Minister for the Economy); 2. Sri Mulyani Indrawati (Minister of Finance, previously State Minister for National Development Planning and Chairperson of the National Development Planning Agency); 3. Fahmi Idris (Minister of Industry, previously Minister of Labor and Transmigration)	Three ministers that were relieved from the cabinet: 1. Jusuf Anwar (Minister of Finance); 2. Andung Nitimihardja (Minister of Industry); 3. Alwi Shihab (Coordinating Minister for People's Welfare)

The second reshuffle, announced on 7 May 2007, changed some of ministers of the cabinet. The changes are:

Five new ministers: 1. Andi Mattalata (Minister of Law and Human Rights); 2. Mohammad Lukman Edy (State Minister for Acceleration of Development in Backwards Regions); 3. Jusman Syafii Djamal (Minister of Transportation); 4. Mohammad Nuh (Minister of Information and Communication); 5. Hendarman Supandji (Attorney General)	Two ministers that were rotated to a different office: 1. Hatta Rajasa (State Secretary, previously Minister of Transportation); 2. Sofyan Djalil (State Minister of State Enterprises, previously Minister of Information and Communication)	Five ministers that were relieved from the cabinet: 1. Hamid Awaluddin (Minister of Law and Human Rights); 2. Soegiharto (State Minister of State Enterprises); 3. Yusril Ihza Mahendra (State Secretary); 4. Saifullah Yusuf (State Minister for Acceleration of Development in Backwards Regions); 5. Abdul Rahman Saleh (Attorney General)

== Later changes ==
- Boediono was replaced by Sri Mulyani Indrawati as Coordinating Minister for Economics due to Boediono's appointment for the Governor of the Bank of Indonesia in May 2008.
- Maj. Gen. (ret.) Mardiyanto replaced Lt. Gen. (ret.) M. Ma'ruf as Minister of Interior Affairs in August 2007 after Ma'ruf suffered a stroke and heart attack in March.

== See also ==
- Politics of Indonesia
