= Airlangga (disambiguation) =

Airlangga (1002–1049) was the king of the Kingdom of Kahuripan in modern-day Indonesia.

Airlangga can also refer to:

== People ==
- Airlangga Hartarto, Indonesian politician
- Airlangga Sutjipto (born 1985), Indonesian former football forward
- Ravindra Airlangga, Indonesian politician

== Other uses ==
- Airlangga University, university in Surabaya, East Java, Indonesia
- Airlangga (train), passenger train in Indonesia
