= Sudirman Said =

Indonesian politician

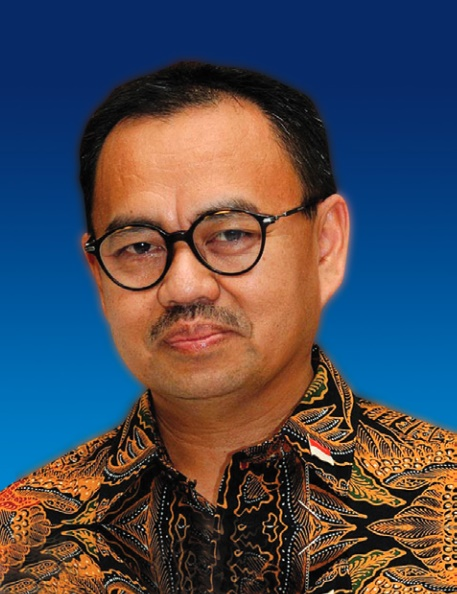
- Official portrait, 2015

15th Minister of Energy and Mineral Resources
- In office 27 October 2014 – 27 July 2016
- President: Joko Widodo
- Preceded by: Jero Wacik; Chairul Tanjung (Acting)
- Succeeded by: Arcandra Tahar

President Director of Pindad
- In office 4 June 2014 – 27 October 2014
- Preceded by: Tri Hardjono
- Succeeded by: Silmy Karim

Personal details
- Born: 16 April 1963 (age 63) Slatri, Larangan, Brebes, Central Java, Indonesia
- Party: Independent
- Other political affiliations: Gerindra (2018–2019); Coalition of Change for Unity (2023–2024)
- Spouse: Astried Swastika Ayuningtyas (m. 2016)
- Children: 6
- Education: Sekolah Tinggi Akuntansi Negara; George Washington University

Sudirman Said (born 16 April 1963) is the former Minister of Energy and Mineral Resources of the Republic of Indonesia on the Working Cabinet from 27 October 2014 to 27 July 2016. He was replaced by Arcandra Tahar in the second cabinet reshuffle. He is known as an anti corruption figure.

In 2018, he ran in the Central Java gubernatorial election against incumbent Ganjar Pranowo.

== Education ==
In 1990, Sudirman completed his studies at the Indonesian State College of Accountancy where he obtained a BSc in accounting. In 1994, he also attended George Washington University and obtained a master's degree in Business Administration. He was then elected as Chairman of the Finance -STAN from 2013 to 2016.

== Career ==
=== Masyarakat Transparansi Indonesia (MTI) ===
Sudirman Said, along with other anti-corruption figures such as Erry Riyana Hardjapamekas (former member of Komisi Pemberantasan Korupsi), Sri Mulyani (then former Minister of Finance), a few others founded Masyarakat Transparansi Indonesia (MTI). The goal of the organization is to increase transparency from Indonesian ministers, stopping the criminalization of KPK, and pushing the government to resolve ongoing corruption cases.

=== Vice Director of PT Petrosea ===
In May 2013 Sudirman Said was selected to be the vice director of PT Petrosea, a mining company under Indika Energy Group.

=== Executive Director of PT Pindad ===
On 6 June 2014 Dahlan Iskan, the Minister for State Owned Enterprises, selected Said to be the executive director of PT Pindad.

== Political career ==
=== Minister of Energy and Mineral Resources ===
Sudirman Said is selected by President Joko Widodo to be the Ministry of Energy and Mineral Resources (ESDM), replacing Chairul Tanjung, who had acted as acting minister to Jero Wacik, who is caught in the anti-corruption probe from Komisi Pemberantasan Korupsi.

In November 2015, he reported Setya Novanto, the House speaker, for allegedly misusing the name of President Joko Widodo in a meeting with Freeport Indonesia President-Director Maroef Sjamsoeddin, in an alleged attempt to extort 20 percent of shares (worth US$4 billion) in the company in exchange for an extension of its contract to manage the Grasberg mine in Papua. An ethics inquiry was launched against Novanto, but ultimately Novanto resigned before any results from the inquiry is carried out.

In July 2016, he was replaced by Jokowi during a reshuffle. He was replaced by Archandra Tahar.

=== 2018 Indonesian local elections ===
Said ran against incumbent Ganjar Pranowo in 2018 Central Java gubernatorial election. Said was backed up by the National Awakening Party, Great Indonesia Movement Party, Prosperous Justice Party, and National Mandate Party. Said was defeated in the election, only getting 41.22% of the votes.

=== 2019 Indonesian general election ===
After his defeat in the local election, Said decided to run for the People's Consultative Assembly seat, under the Great Indonesia Movement Party. Said remarked that he ran under the Great Indonesia Movement Party because the party is the first party that supported him during the local election in Central Java. During the general election Said supported Prabowo Subianto's bid, and a frequent critic of President Joko Widodo.

On the general election Said was defeated, and failed his bid to join the People's Consultative Assembly, after not getting enough votes.
