= Second United Indonesia Cabinet =

Indonesian government cabinet (2009–2014)

Second United Indonesia Cabinet Kabinet Indonesia Bersatu II
- 39th Cabinet of Indonesia
- 2009–2014
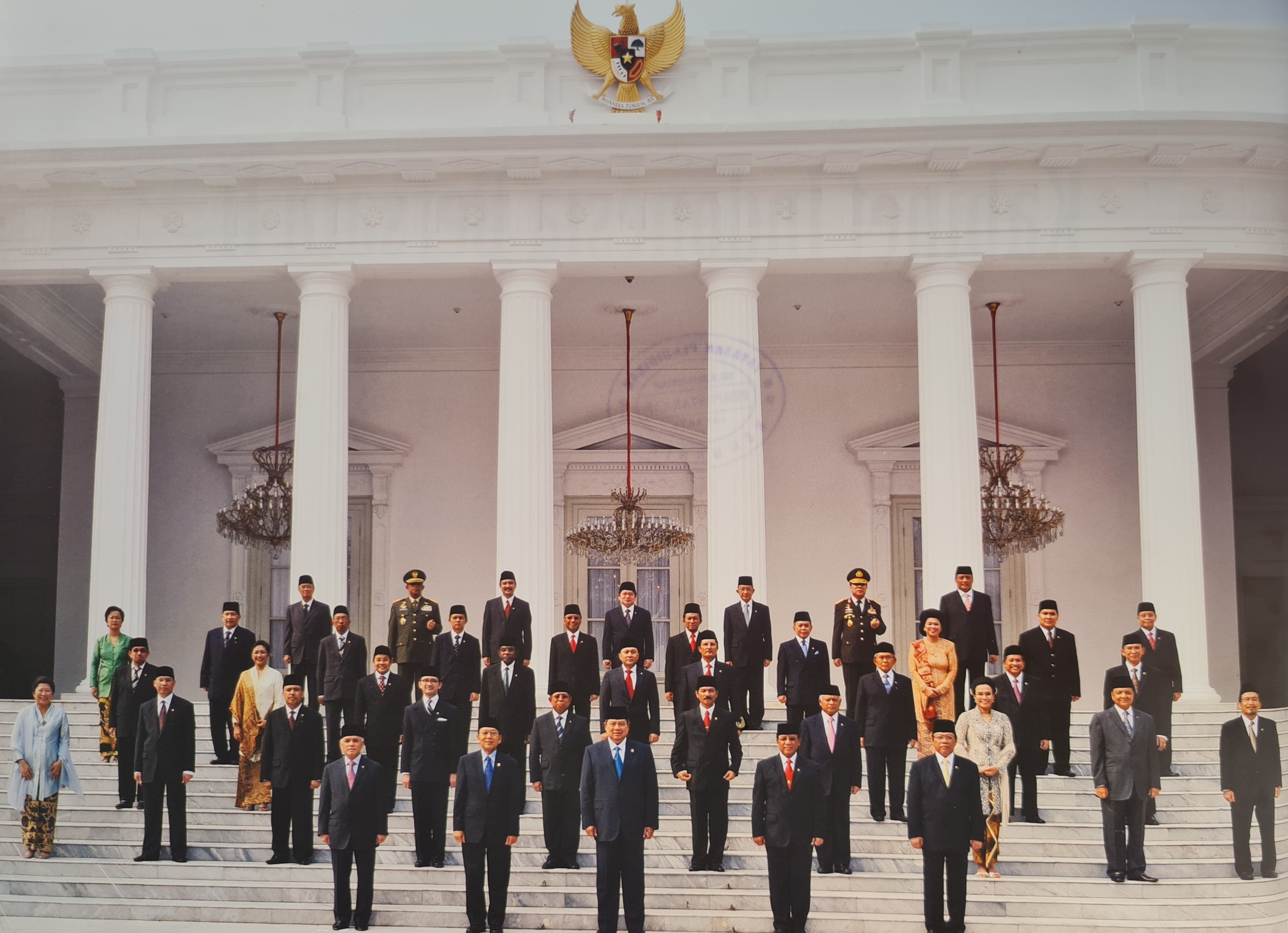
- President Susilo Bambang Yudhoyono (front row, centre) with the newly-elected cabinet in front of the Istana Merdeka, 22 October 2009
- Date formed: 22 October 2009
- Date dissolved: 20 October 2014

People and organisations
- President: Susilo Bambang Yudhoyono
- Vice President: Boediono
- No. of ministers: 34 ministers; 17 deputy ministers
- Member parties: Joint Secretariat of the Government-Supporting Coalition Parties: Demokrat; Golkar; PKB; PAN; PPP; PKS; Independent
- Status in legislature: Majority coalition 423 / 560
- Opposition parties: PDI-P; Gerindra; Hanura

History
- Election: 2009 Indonesian presidential election
- Predecessor: United Indonesia I Cabinet
- Successor: Working Cabinet

The Second United Indonesia Cabinet (Indonesian: Kabinet Indonesia Bersatu II) was sworn in on 22 October 2009, two days after the inauguration of President Susilo Bambang Yudhoyono for the second term. The cabinet consisted of members from Yudhoyono's Democratic Party and its coalition partners (the Prosperous Justice Party, the National Mandate Party, the United Development Party, National Awakening Party and the Golkar Party) as well as non-party figures.

== Cabinet lineup ==
President Yudhoyono officially announced the cabinet lineup on 21 October 2009 at 10 pm, one day after his inauguration. On 18 October 2011, Yudhoyono announced the reshuffled cabinet.

President	Vice President
Susilo Bambang Yudhoyono	Boediono

Position	Name	Took office	Left office
=== Coordinating ministers ===
Coordinating Minister for Political, Legal, and Security Affairs	Djoko Suyanto	22 October 2009	20 October 2014
Coordinating Minister for Economic Affairs	Hatta Rajasa	22 October 2009	13 May 2014
Coordinating Minister for Economic Affairs	Chairul Tanjung	19 May 2014	20 October 2014
Coordinating Minister for People's Welfare	Agung Laksono	22 October 2009	20 October 2014
State Secretary	Sudi Silalahi	22 October 2009	20 October 2014
=== Departmental ministers ===
Minister of Home Affairs	Gamawan Fauzi	22 October 2009	20 October 2014
Minister of Foreign Affairs	Marty Natalegawa	22 October 2009	20 October 2014
Minister of Defense	Purnomo Yusgiantoro	22 October 2009	20 October 2014
Minister of Law and Human Rights	Patrialis Akbar	22 October 2009	19 October 2011
Minister of Law and Human Rights	Amir Syamsuddin	19 October 2011	20 October 2014
Minister of Finance	Sri Mulyani	22 October 2009	20 May 2010
Minister of Finance	Agus Martowardojo	20 May 2010	19 April 2013
Minister of Finance	Hatta Rajasa (acting)	19 April 2013	21 May 2013
Minister of Finance	Muhamad Chatib Basri	21 May 2013	20 October 2014
Minister of Energy and Mineral Resources	Darwin Saleh	22 October 2009	19 October 2011
Minister of Energy and Mineral Resources	Jero Wacik	19 October 2011	5 September 2014
Minister of Energy and Mineral Resources	Chairul Tanjung (acting)	11 September 2014	20 October 2014
Minister of Industry	Mohamad Suleman Hidayat	22 October 2009	20 October 2014
Minister of Trade	Mari Elka Pangestu	22 October 2009	19 October 2011
Minister of Trade	Gita Wirjawan	19 October 2011	31 January 2014
Minister of Trade	Bayu Krisnamurthi (acting)	31 January 2014	14 February 2014
Minister of Trade	Muhammad Lutfi	14 February 2014	20 October 2014
Minister of Agriculture	Suswono	22 October 2009	20 October 2014
Minister of Forestry	Zulkifli Hasan	22 October 2009	1 October 2014
Minister of Forestry	Chairul Tanjung (acting)	1 October 2014	20 October 2014
Minister of Transportation	Freddy Numberi	22 October 2009	19 October 2011
Minister of Transportation	E. E. Mangindaan	19 October 2011	1 October 2014
Minister of Transportation	Bambang Susantono (acting)	1 October 2014	20 October 2014
Minister of Marine Affairs and Fisheries	Fadel Muhammad	22 October 2009	19 October 2011
Minister of Marine Affairs and Fisheries	Sharif Cicip Sutardjo	19 October 2011	20 October 2014
Minister of Labor and Transmigration	Muhaimin Iskandar	22 October 2009	1 October 2014
Minister of Labor and Transmigration	Armida Alisjahbana (acting)	1 October 2014	20 October 2014
Minister of Public Works	Djoko Kirmanto	22 October 2009	20 October 2014
Minister of Health	Endang Rahayu Sedyaningsih	22 October 2009	30 April 2012
Minister of Health	Ali Ghufron Mukti (acting)	30 April 2012	14 June 2012
Minister of Health	Nafsiah Mboi	14 June 2012	20 October 2014
Minister of Education and Culture (before 19 October 2011 named Minister of National Education)	Muhammad Nuh	22 October 2009	20 October 2014
Minister of Social Affairs	Salim Segaf Al-Jufri	22 October 2009	20 October 2014
Minister of Religious Affairs	Suryadharma Ali	22 October 2009	28 May 2014
Minister of Religious Affairs	Agung Laksono (acting)	28 May 2014	9 Juni 2014
Minister of Religious Affairs	Lukman Hakim Saifuddin	9 Juni 2014	20 October 2014
Minister of Tourism and Creative Economy (before 19 October 2011 named Minister of Culture and Tourism)	Jero Wacik	22 October 2009	19 October 2011
Minister of Tourism and Creative Economy (before 19 October 2011 named Minister of Culture and Tourism)	Mari Elka Pangestu	19 October 2011	20 October 2014
Minister of Communication and Informatics	Tifatul Sembiring	22 October 2009	1 October 2014
Minister of Communication and Informatics	Djoko Suyanto (acting)	1 October 2014	20 October 2014
Minister of Research and Technology	Suharna Surapranata	22 October 2009	19 October 2011
Minister of Research and Technology	Gusti Muhammad Hatta	19 October 2011	20 October 2014
Minister for Cooperatives and Small and Medium Enterprises	Syarifuddin Hasan	22 October 2009	1 October 2014
Minister for Cooperatives and Small and Medium Enterprises	Muhammad Lutfi (acting)	1 October 2014	20 October 2014
Minister of Environment	Gusti Muhammad Hatta	22 October 2009	19 October 2011
Minister of Environment	Berth Kambuaya	19 October 2011	20 October 2014
Minister for Female Empowerment and Child Protection	Linda Amalia Sari	22 October 2009	20 October 2014
Minister for State Apparatus Utilization and Bureaucratic Reforms	E. E. Mangindaan	22 October 2009	19 October 2011
Minister for State Apparatus Utilization and Bureaucratic Reforms	Azwar Abubakar	19 October 2011	20 October 2014
Minister for Development of Underdeveloped Regions	Helmy Faishal Zaini	22 October 2009	1 October 2014
Minister for Development of Underdeveloped Regions	Armida Alisjahbana (acting)	1 October 2014	20 October 2014
Minister for National Development Planning or Head of the National Development Planning Agency	Armida Alisjahbana	22 October 2009	20 October 2014
Minister for State-Owned Enterprises	Mustafa Abubakar	22 October 2009	19 October 2011
Minister for State-Owned Enterprises	Dahlan Iskan	19 October 2011	20 October 2014
Minister for Public Housing	Suharso Monoarfa	22 October 2009	19 October 2011
Minister for Public Housing	Djan Faridz	19 October 2011	20 October 2014
Minister for Youth and Sports	Andi Alfian Mallarangeng	22 October 2009	7 December 2012
Minister for Youth and Sports	Agung Laksono (acting)	7 December 2012	15 January 2013
Minister for Youth and Sports	Roy Suryo	15 January 2013	20 October 2014
=== Non-ministerial posts ===
Attorney General	Hendarman Supandji	9 May 2007	24 September 2010
Attorney General	Darmono (acting)	24 September 2010	26 November 2010
Attorney General	Basrief Arief	26 November 2010	20 October 2014
Commander of the Indonesian National Armed Forces	General Djoko Santoso	28 December 2007	28 September 2010
Commander of the Indonesian National Armed Forces	Admiral Agus Suhartono	28 September 2010	30 August 2013
Commander of the Indonesian National Armed Forces	General Moeldoko	30 August 2013	8 July 2015
Chief of the Indonesian National Police	General Bambang Hendarso Danuri	30 September 2007	22 October 2010
Chief of the Indonesian National Police	General Timur Pradopo	22 October 2010	25 October 2013
Chief of the Indonesian National Police	General Sutarman	25 October 2013	16 January 2015
Head of Presidential Unit for Development Monitoring and Control	Kuntoro Mangkusubroto	22 October 2009	31 December 2014

== Other officials ==
=== Cabinet secretary ===
Position	Image	Name	Took office	Left office	Note
Cabinet Secretary		Dipo Alam	7 January 2010	20 October 2014	

=== Heads of government agencies ===
These positions as heads of government agencies were announced at the same time as the cabinet lineup.

Portfolio	Minister	Took office	Left office	Ref
Head of State Intelligence Agency	Sutanto	6 January 2009	19 October 2011	
Head of State Intelligence Agency	Marciano Norman	6 January 2010	Incumbent	
Head of Investment Coordinating Board	Gita Wirjawan	6 January 2010	14 June 2012	
Head of Investment Coordinating Board	Muhamad Chatib Basri	14 June 2012	1 October 2013	
Head of Investment Coordinating Board	Mahendra Siregar	1 October 2013	27 November 2014	

=== Deputy ministers ===
Deputy ministers are not members of the cabinet.

Portfolio	Minister	Took office	Left office	Ref
Deputy Minister of Foreign Affairs	Triyono Wibowo	11 September 2008	19 October 2011	
Deputy Minister of Foreign Affairs	Wardana	19 October 2011	14 July 2014	
Deputy Minister of Foreign Affairs	Dino Patti Djalal	14 July 2014	20 October 2014	
Deputy Minister of Defense	Sjafrie Sjamsoeddin	6 January 2010	20 October 2014	
Deputy Minister of Law and Human Rights	Denny Indrayana	19 October 2011	20 October 2014	
Deputy Minister of Finance	Anny Ratnawati	20 May 2010	20 October 2014	
Deputy Minister of Finance	Mahendra Siregar	19 October 2011	3 October 2013	
Deputy Minister of Finance	Bambang Brodjonegoro	3 October 2013	20 October 2014	
Deputy Minister of Energy and Mineral Resources	Widjajono Partowidagdo	19 October 2011	21 April 2012	
Deputy Minister of Energy and Mineral Resources	Vacant	21 April 2012	14 June 2012	
Deputy Minister of Energy and Mineral Resources	Rudi Rubiandini	14 June 2012	15 January 2013	
Deputy Minister of Energy and Mineral Resources	Susilo Siswoutomo	15 January 2013	20 October 2014	
Deputy Minister of Industry	Alex Retraubun	6 January 2010	20 October 2014	
Deputy Minister of Trade	Mahendra Siregar	6 January 2010	19 October 2011	
Deputy Minister of Trade	Bayu Krisnamurthi	19 October 2011	20 October 2014	
Deputy Minister of Agriculture	Bayu Krisnamurthi	6 January 2010	19 October 2011	
Deputy Minister of Agriculture	Rusman Heriawan	19 October 2011	20 October 2014	
Deputy Minister of Transportation	Bambang Susantono	6 January 2010	20 October 2014	
Deputy Minister of Public Works	Hermanto Dardak	6 January 2010	20 October 2014	
Deputy Minister of Health	Ali Ghufron Mukti	19 October 2011	20 October 2014	
Deputy Minister of National Education	Fasli Jalal	6 January 2010	19 October 2011	
Deputy Minister of Education and Culture, Education Field	Musliar Kasim	19 October 2011	20 October 2014	
Deputy Minister of Education and Culture, Culture Field	Wiendu Nuryanti	19 October 2011	20 October 2014	
Deputy Minister of Religious Affairs	Nasaruddin Umar	19 October 2011	20 October 2014	
Deputy Minister of Tourism and Creative Economy	Sapta Nirwandar	19 October 2011	20 October 2014	
Deputy Minister of National Development Planning	Lukita Dinarsyah Tuwo	6 January 2010	20 October 2014	
Deputy Minister of State Apparatus Utilization and Bureaucratic Reform	Eko Prasojo	19 October 2011	20 October 2014	

== See also ==
- Politics of Indonesia
- Kabinet Indonesia Bersatu II
