= Alifuddin =

Indonesian politician

Member of House of Representatives
- Incumbent
- Assumed office 1 October 2019
- Constituency: West Kalimantan I
- Majority: 45,516 (2019); 50,391 (2024)

Member of West Kalimantan Regional House of Representatives
- In office 2009–2014

Member of Pontianak City DPRD
- In office 1999–2004

Personal details
- Born: 25 August 1965 (age 61) Jakarta, Indonesia
- Party: Prosperous Justice Party

Alifuddin (also spelled Alifudin; born 25 August 1965) is an Indonesian politician of the Prosperous Justice Party and former civil servant who is currently a member of the House of Representatives from West Kalimantan's 1st district, serving since 2019. He had previously served one term each in the West Kalimantan Regional House of Representatives and Pontianak's city council.

== Early life ==
Alifuddin was born in Jakarta on 25 August 1965, in a Betawi family. He completed his basic education in public schools in Jakarta, then received a diploma in accounting from the Indonesian State College of Accountancy in 1988. He would later receive a bachelor's (1998) and master's (2005) in management from Tanjungpura University.

== Career ==
After receiving his diploma, Alifuddin took on a civil servant job at the Finance and Development Supervisory Board for West Kalimantan in Pontianak, starting in 1988. He worked as an auditor. In 1998, following the fall of Suharto, Alifuddin began to enter politics, and resigned from his civil servant work in order to run in the 1999 legislative election. He joined the Justice Party (renamed Prosperous Justice Party/PKS in 2002) and won a seat in Pontianak's Regional House of Representatives, becoming the first party member to have a seat there.

Alifuddin did not get a second term at Pontianak in 2004, and instead became a staffer to PKS' fraction in the House of Representatives (DPR) between 2006 and 2009. In the 2009 legislative election, he won a seat at the West Kalimantan Regional House of Representatives to represent Pontianak. He ran for a DPR seat in the 2014 legislative election, but was not elected. He ran again for a DPR seat in 2019, and was elected to represent West Kalimantan's 1st district with 45,516 votes. He was reelected for a second term in 2024 from the same district with 50,391 votes.

During both his first and second terms, he was part of the Ninth Commission, which covered healthcare, labor affairs, and social security. He has declared his opposition in 2019 to a hike in BPJS monthly payments and in 2022 to a minimum pension payments age of 56. He has also supported increasing national healthcare spending to 10 percent of the national budget (from 4 percent in 2023). During the COVID-19 pandemic in Indonesia, Alifuddin opposed a government policy requiring negative testing results or a vaccine certificate to travel. In 2025, he pushed for the legislature to pass a "Family Resilience" (Indonesian: Ketahanan Keluarga) law which would explicitly classify LGBT behavior as sexual deviancy and regulate family members to report such behaviors to the government. His push was in response to the publicization of an incest fantasy group on Facebook.

Within PKS, Alifuddin had been secretary of the party's West Kalimantan branch, part of its central committee, and was chairman of its provincial advisory council.

== Personal life ==
He married Susanti in 1988, and the couple has six sons and a daughter.
