= Hatta Rajasa =

Indonesian politician

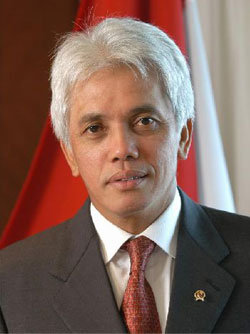
- Hatta Rajasa in 2013

13th Coordinating Minister for Economic Affairs
- In office 22 October 2009 – 19 May 2014
- President: Susilo Bambang Yudhoyono
- Preceded by: Boediono; Sri Mulyani (Acting)
- Succeeded by: Chairul Tanjung

14th Minister of State Secretariat
- In office 9 May 2007 – 22 October 2009
- President: Susilo Bambang Yudhoyono
- Preceded by: Yusril Ihza Mahendra
- Succeeded by: Sudi Silalahi

27th Minister of Transportation
- In office 20 October 2004 – 9 May 2007
- President: Susilo Bambang Yudhoyono
- Preceded by: Agum Gumelar
- Succeeded by: Jusman Syafii Djamal

8th State Minister for Research and Technology
- In office 10 August 2001 – 29 September 2004
- President: Megawati Soekarnoputri
- Preceded by: AS Hikam
- Succeeded by: Kusmayanto Kadiman

3rd General Chairman of National Mandate Party
- In office 9 January 2010 – 1 March 2015
- Preceded by: Soetrisno Bachir
- Succeeded by: Zulkifli Hasan

Personal details
- Born: Muhammad Hatta Rajasa; 18 December 1953 (age 72) Palembang, South Sumatra, Indonesia
- Party: PAN
- Spouse: Oktiniwati Ulfa Dariah Rajasa
- Children: M. Reza Rajasa; Siti Ruby Aliya Rajasa; Azimah Rajasa; Rasyid Rajasa
- Education: Bandung Institute of Technology (Ir.); Slovak University of Agriculture (Dr. (H.C.))
- Occupation: Politician
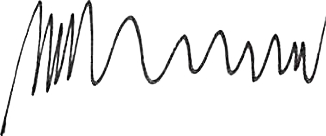
- Signature

Muhammad Hatta Rajasa (born 18 December 1953) is an Indonesian politician who served as the Coordinating Minister for the Economy of Indonesia from 22 October 2009 to 13 May 2014. A member of the National Mandate Party (PAN), he previously served as Minister Secretary of State (2007–2009), Minister of Transportation (2004–2007), and Minister of State for Research and Technology (2001–2004). He was also general Prabowo Subianto's running mate in the 2014 Indonesian presidential election, with the ticket being backed by a number of parties, including the Gerindra party, National Mandate Party, Prosperous Justice Party, United Development Party, the Crescent Star Party and Golkar.

== Early life and education ==
=== Early life ===
Hatta Rajasa was born in Palembang, South Sumatra, on 18 December 1953. He was born into a simple family, the second of 13 children. His father was Muhammad Tohir, a man from Jejawi Village, Ogan Komering Ilir, South Sumatra, who was a soldier who later quit and became a civil servant. His mother was a woman named Aisyah, who came from Adumais Village, East Ogan Komering Ulu, South Sumatra, who was housewife.

=== Education ===
- Bandung Technological Institute – Petroleum Engineering

== Politics ==
He is member of the National Mandate Party (PAN), a moderate Islamic party. Since 2010 he has been chairman of the party.

On 19 May 2014, Hatta registered to run for vice president with Prabowo Subianto running for president in the election on 9 July 2014. The two were supported by 6 parties – PAN, Great Indonesia Movement Party (Gerindra), Prosperous Justice Party (PKS), United Development Party (PPP), Crescent Star Party (PBB) and Golkar.

== Career ==
- 2009–2014: Coordinating Minister for Economic Affairs
- 2004–2009: Minister of Transport (United Indonesia Cabinet)
- 2001–2004: Minister of Research and Technology (Mutual Assistance Cabinet)
- 2000–current: Secretary General of National Mandate Party
- 1999–2000: Chairman of Reformation Faction on People's Representative Council.
- 1982–2000: President Director Arthindo
- 1980–1983: Vice-Technical Manager PT. Meta Epsi
- 1977–1978: Field Technician PT. Bina Patra Jaya

== Personal life ==
Hatta Rajasa is a Palembang Malay. He has a daughter, who is currently married to Edhie "Ibas" Baskoro, the youngest son of former Indonesian president Susilo Bambang Yudhoyono.

== Honours ==
=== National honours ===
- Star of Mahaputera, 2nd Class (Indonesian: Bintang Mahaputera Adipradana) (10 August 2013)

=== Foreign honours ===
- Japan:
  - Gold and Silver Star, Order of the Rising Sun (2024)
- South Korea:
  - Gwanghwa Medal of the Order of Diplomatic Service Merit (2012)

== Notes ==
Political offices
Preceded by AS Hikam	State Minister of Research and Technology; 2001–2004	Succeeded by Kusmayanto Kadiman
Preceded by Agum Gumelar	Minister of Transportation; 2004–2007	Succeeded by Jusman Syafii Djamal
Preceded by Yusril Ihza Mahendra	Minister of State Secretariat; 2007–2009	Succeeded by Sudi Silalahi
Preceded by Boediono; Sri Mulyani (Acting)	Coordinating Minister for Economic Affairs; 2009–2014	Succeeded by Chairul Tanjung
Preceded by Agus Martowardojo	Minister of Finance; Acting; 2013–2013	Succeeded by Muhamad Chatib Basri
Party political offices
Preceded by Soetrisno Bachir	General Chairman of National Mandate Party; 2010–2015	Succeeded by Zulkifli Hasan
