= Ignasius Jonan =

Indonesian politician

17th Minister of Energy and Mineral Resources
- In office 14 October 2016 – 20 October 2019
- President: Joko Widodo
- Preceded by: Arcandra Tahar
- Succeeded by: Arifin Tasrif

31st Minister of Transportation
- In office 27 October 2014 – 27 July 2016
- President: Joko Widodo
- Preceded by: E.E. Mangindaan
- Succeeded by: Budi Karya Sumadi

Personal details
- Born: 21 June 1963 (age 63) State of Singapore
- Spouse: Ratnawati Jonan
- Children: 2
- Education: St Louis 1 School
- Alma mater: Airlangga University (Drs.); Fletcher School of Law and Diplomacy (M.A.); Tufts University (M.A.)
- Occupation: Indonesian Minister for Energy and Mineral Resources

Ignasius Jonan (born 21 June 1963) is an Indonesian professional who was the Indonesian Minister for Energy and Mineral Resources serving under President Joko Widodo's administration. He is a former Indonesian Minister of Transportation and a former CEO of the Indonesian government-owned railway company, PT Kereta Api Indonesia (PT. KAI) which he headed from 2009 to 2014.

Born in Singapore, Jonan received his bachelor's degree in accounting from Airlangga University, Surabaya in 1986, and his M.A. in International Relations and Affairs from the Fletcher School of Law and Diplomacy and Tufts University in 2005. He started his professional career in the banking sector, holding a managing director role and investment banking head in Citigroup Indonesia, before entering the public transportation sector in 2009. He was named by Sofyan Djalil, the then-Minister of State-owned Enterprises, to lead P.T. Kereta Api Indonesia.

== Early life and education ==
Jonan was born on 21 June 1963 in Singapore. He grew up in Surabaya, graduating from St. Louis 1 Catholic High School in the city. He later graduated with a bachelor's degree in accounting from Airlangga University's School of Business and Economics in 1985. He took executive and management programs between 1999 and 2000 from Columbia Business School and the John F. Kennedy School of Government at Harvard University. Jonan received his master's degree in International Relations in 2005 from the Global Master of Arts Program (GMAP) at The Fletcher School of Law and Diplomacy, Tufts University.

== Career ==
Jonan started his career as an accountant and investment manager. In 1999, he became Director for Private Equity at Citigroup branch in Indonesia. Two years later, he was appointed CEO of the government-owned investment firm, PT. Bahana Pembinaan Usaha Indonesia, assuming the role until 2006. From 2006 to 2009, he was promoted by Citi as managing director and Head of Investment Banking for Indonesia.

=== PT KAI ===
Jonan was appointed head of P.T. Kereta Api Indonesia in 2009, during the railway company's output and financial troubles. He faced various problems including PT. KAI's 27,000 employees with low expectations in terms of work quality, a financial deficit (in 2008, it lost Rp 82.6 billion), and a high percentage of substandard or broken locomotives, diesel trains, freight cars, and crumbling stations. In a speech for the Jakarta Foreign Correspondents Club, Jonan blamed the low train fares as a cause for the railway system's poor service and crowdedness.

Within 5 years, he overturned the public perception of the failing Indonesian rail transportation system. The company was able to increase passenger ridership by 50% in 2014 compared to when Jonan took up the role in 2009. Freight loads have also doubled to nearly 30 million tons per year.

=== Transport minister ===
On 26 October 2014, the newly elected Indonesian President Joko Widodo named him as the 37th Minister of Transportation. Within this capacity, Jonan had wanted to ban ride-hailing apps such as Uber and Grab in 2015 citing existing regulations, but he was overridden by Widodo. In 2016, he again threatened a ban on the apps as they had not formally registered as taxi operators with the government.

Following the crash of Indonesia AirAsia Flight 8501 in 2014, Jonan alleged that budget airlines in Indonesia had been endangering passenger safety due to cost-cutting measures.

=== Energy and Mineral Resources minister ===
On 27 July 2016, President Joko Widodo removed Jonan from his post in a cabinet reshuffle. In response to the reshuffle, Ignasius Jonan, with a flat face, said, "I will come back". On 14 October 2016, the president appointed Ignasius Jonan again, but as Minister of Energy and Mineral Resources with Arcandra Tahar as his deputy.

== Honours ==
=== National ===
- Indonesia :
  - Star of Mahaputera (2nd Class) (Indonesian: Bintang Mahaputera Adipradana) (2020)

=== Foreign honours ===
- France :
  - Chevalier of the National Order of Legion of Honour (2016)
- Japan :
  - Gold and Silver Star of the Order of the Rising Sun (2022)
- Vatican :
  - Knight Commander with Star of the Order of St. Gregory the Great (2023)
