= Arcandra Tahar =

Indonesian politician

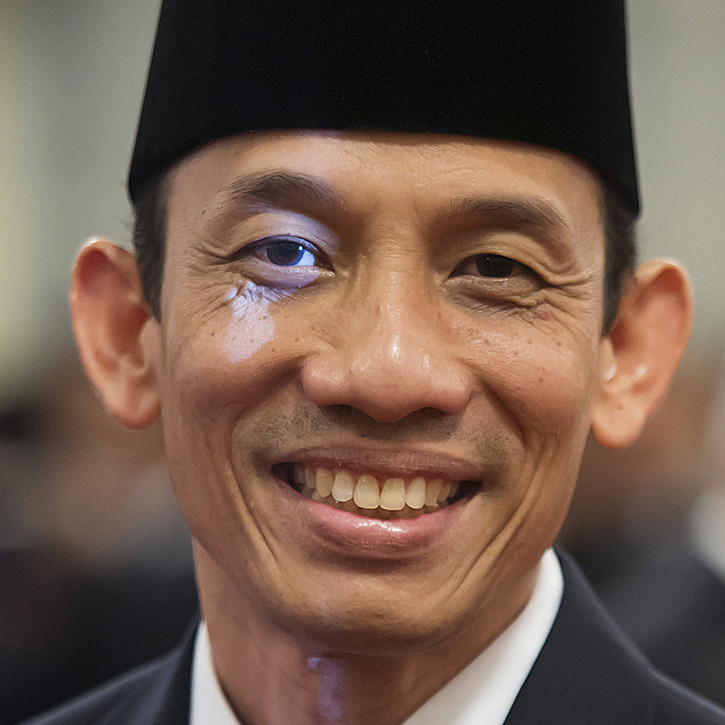

5th Deputy Minister for Energy and Mineral Resources
- In office 14 October 2016 – 20 October 2019
- President: Joko Widodo
- Vice President: Muhammad Jusuf Kalla
- Minister: Ignasius Jonan
- Preceded by: Susilo Siswoutomo

16th Minister for Energy and Mineral Resources
- In office 27 July 2016 – 15 August 2016
- President: Joko Widodo
- Vice President: Muhammad Jusuf Kalla
- Preceded by: Sudirman Said
- Succeeded by: Ignasius Jonan

Personal details
- Born: 10 October 1970 (age 55) Padang, West Sumatra, Indonesia
- Citizenship: Indonesia (1970–present), United States (2012–2016)
- Party: Independent
- Relations: Taharuddin (father) and Zuraida (mother)
- Children: 2
- Education: Bandung Institute of Technology (Ir.); Texas A&M University (MS, PhD)
- Profession: Engineer

Arcandra Tahar (born 10 October 1970) is an Indonesian politician. He was formerly Minister of Energy and Mineral Resources of the Republic of Indonesia on the Working Cabinet, replacing Sudirman Said who was dismissed by President Joko Widodo in a cabinet reshuffle on 27 July 2016.

Tahar was honourably discharged from the said post on 15 August 2016, following allegations that he was a U.S. citizen, making him the minister with the shortest working period in Indonesian history (20 days). He was later appointed Deputy Minister of the same.

== Early life ==
Tahar was born on 10 October 1970 at Padang, West Sumatra, Indonesia, to Taharuddin and Zuraida. He is of Minangkabau descent and a Muslim.

== Education ==
Studying there from 1989–1994, Tahar obtained a Bachelor of Science in Mechanical Engineering at the Bandung Institute of Technology, then went to work for Andersen Consulting. Subsequently, he enrolled at Texas A&M University in 1996 for his Master's of Science in Ocean Engineering, successfully graduating in 1998. He remained at A&M as a candidate for the Doctorate of Philosophy in Ocean Engineering, which he obtained in 2001.

== Citizenship controversy ==
Not long after being appointed Minister, there was a rumour that Tahar had become a citizen of the United States in March 2012. Because Indonesia does not recognize dual nationality, this meant that Tahar would have lost his Indonesian nationality. However, according to Tahar, he entered Indonesia using an Indonesian passport valid until 2017.

On 12 August 2016, the U.S. embassy in Jakarta issued him with a Certificate of Loss of Nationality, which was endorsed by the Department of State on 15 August 2016 (his name appears on the Quarterly Publication of Individuals Who Have Chosen to Expatriate). This meant that Tahar had relinquished his U.S. citizenship. That same day, Tahar was removed by President Joko Widodo and replaced by Luhut Pandjaitan.

On 30 August 2016, the U.S. embassy wrote a letter on Tahar's behalf, confirming his loss of U.S. nationality. As Tahar was no longer a U.S. citizen, the Ministry of Justice and Human Rights under Yasonna Laoly ceased loss-of-nationality proceedings against him to prevent his statelessness and granted him a certificate of retention of citizenship on 1 September 2016. This made him once again eligible for Indonesian government appointments.

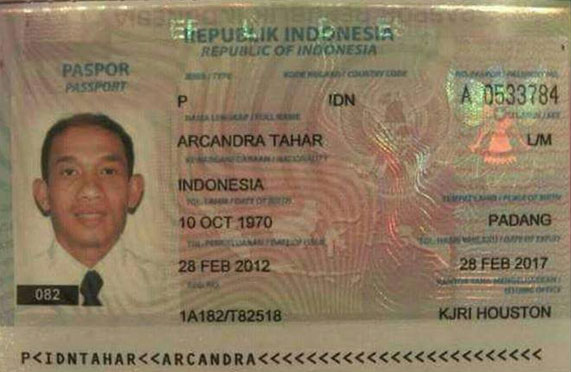
Tahar's Indonesian passport.

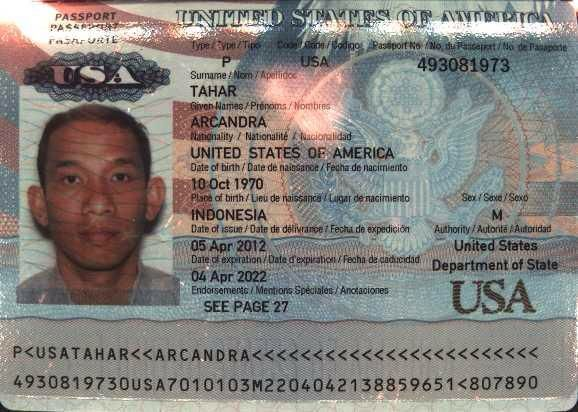
Tahar's US passport.

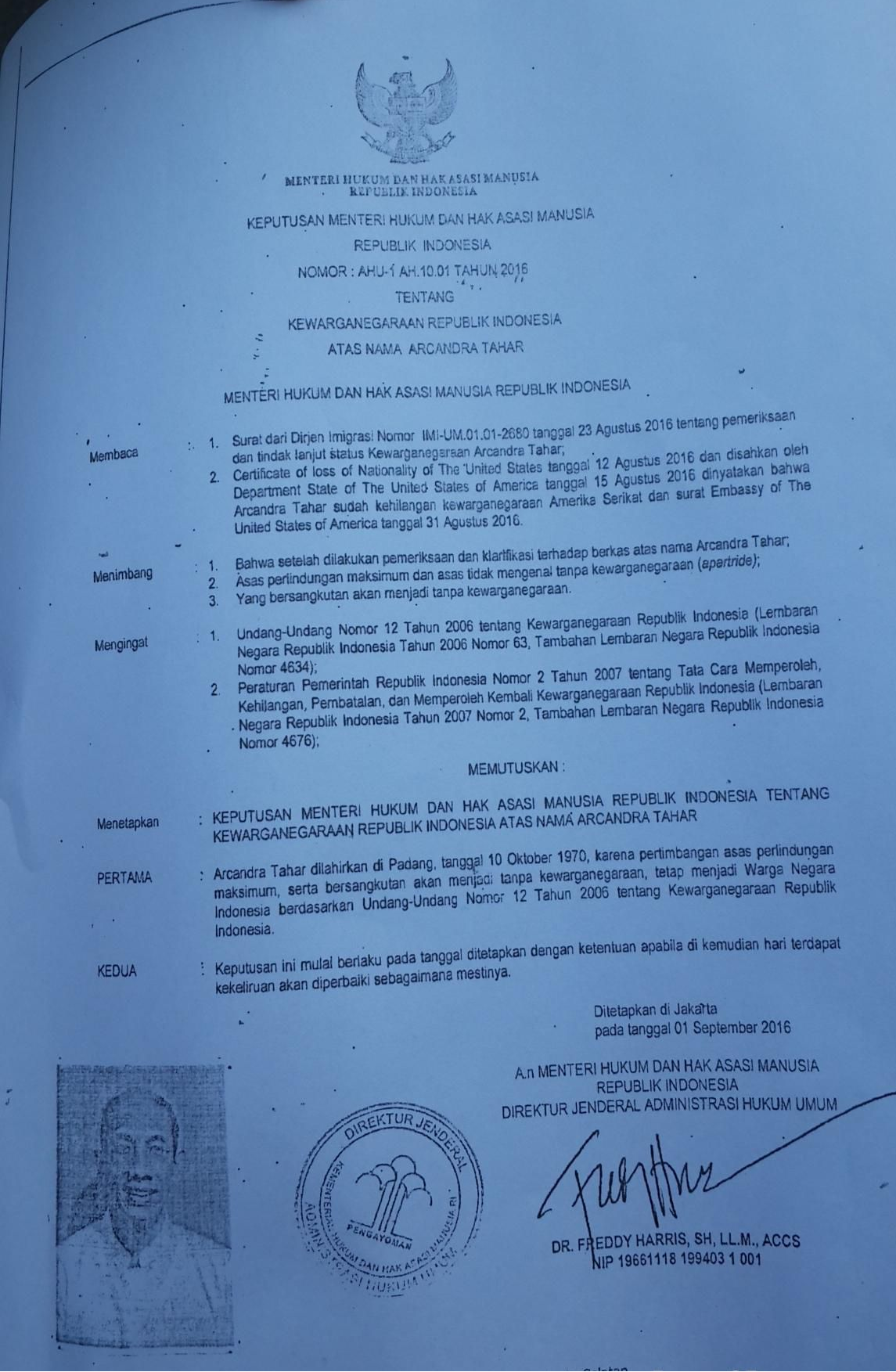
Tahar's Indonesian certificate of retention of citizenship.

== Subsequent political career ==
On 14 October 2016, Tahar was officially sworn in as Deputy Minister under Minister of Energy and Mineral Resources Ignasius Jonan.
