= Mohamad Suleman Hidayat =

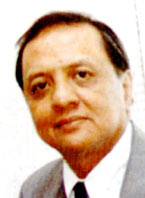

22nd Minister of Industry
- In office 22 October 2009 – 20 October 2014
- President: Susilo Bambang Yudhoyono
- Preceded by: Fahmi Idris
- Succeeded by: Saleh Husin

Personal details
- Born: 2 December 1944 (age 81) Djombang Soerabaja Residency, Japanese East Indies

Mohamad Suleman Hidayat (born 2 December 1944) is an Indonesian businessman and politician from Jombang, East Java. He was part of the Second United Indonesia Cabinet and has served as Minister of Industry in Indonesia since 22 October 2009 until 20 October 2014. He previously served as chairman of KADIN from 2004 and as chairman of Real Estate Indonesia (1989–1992) and vice chairman of the Asia Pacific Real Estate Federation (APREF).
