= Tanri Abeng =

Indonesian politician (1942–2024)

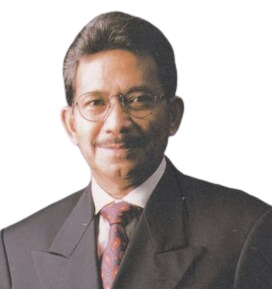
- Abeng in 2001

State Minister of Utilization of State Owned Enterprises
- In office 16 March 1998 – 20 October 1999
- Preceded by: position established
- Succeeded by: Laksamana Sukardi

Personal details
- Born: 7 March 1942 Selayar Islands Regency, Japanese-occupied Dutch East Indies
- Died: 23 June 2024 (aged 82) Jakarta, Indonesia
- Party: Golkar
- Education: Hasanuddin University; University at Buffalo; Gadjah Mada University
- Occupation: Businessman

Tanri Abeng (7 March 1942 – 23 June 2024) was an Indonesian politician. A member of Golkar, he served as State Minister of Utilization of State Owned Enterprises from 1998 to 1999.

Abeng died in Jakarta on 23 June 2024, at the age of 82.
