= Working Cabinet (2014–2019) =

First government of Indonesian President Joko Widodo

Working Cabinet Kabinet Kerja
- 40th Cabinet of Indonesia
- 2014–2019
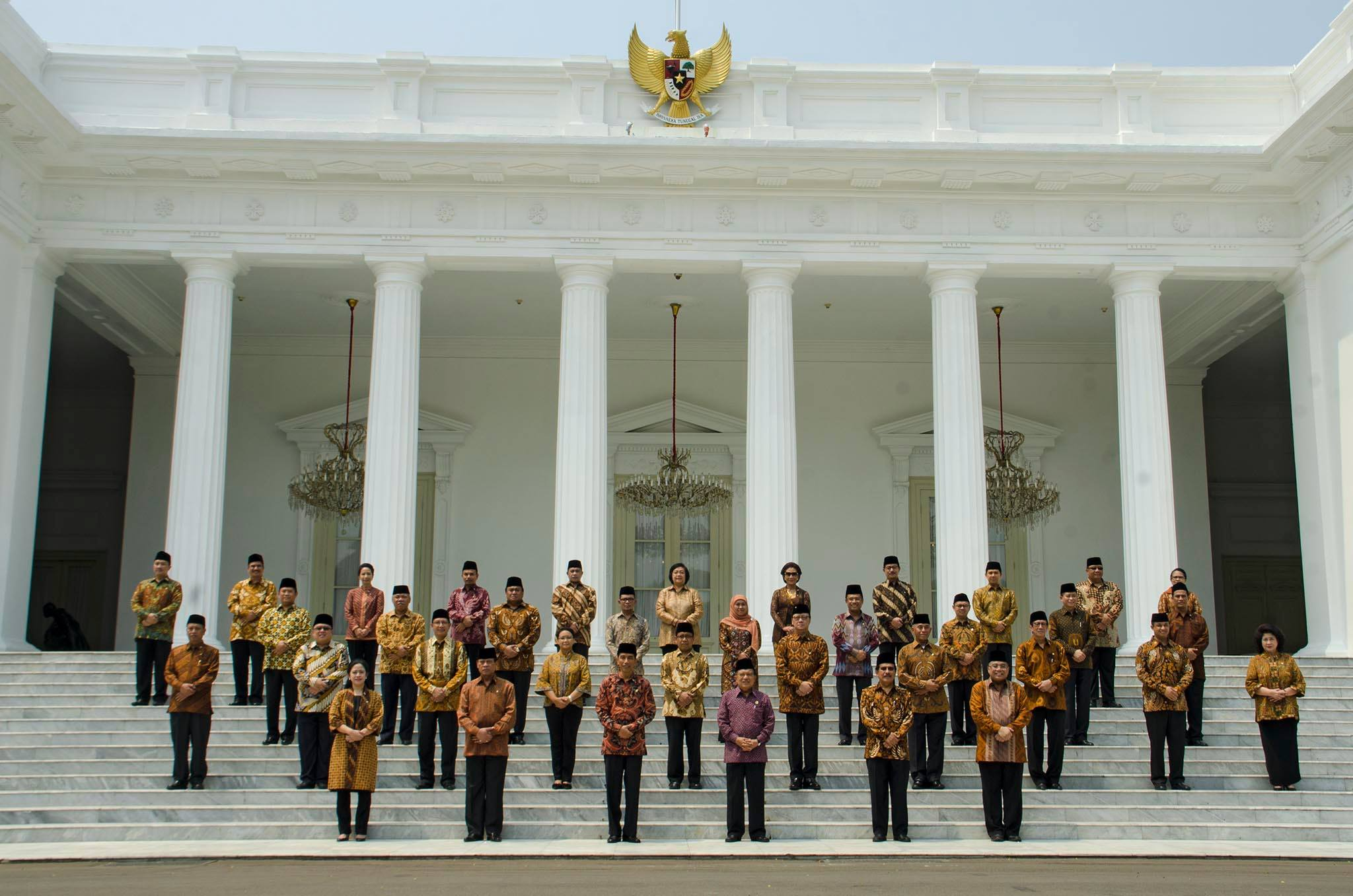
- Date formed: 27 October 2014
- Date dissolved: 20 October 2019

People and organisations
- Head of government: Joko Widodo
- No. of ministers: 34 ministers; 3 deputy ministers
- Member parties: Great Indonesia Coalition: Indonesian Democratic Party of Struggle; Golkar (2016–2019); People's Conscience Party; National Awakening Party; United Development Party; NasDem Party; National Mandate Party (2016–2018); Independent
- Status in legislature: Minority coalition (2014–2016) 246 / 560 Majority coalition (2016–2019) 337 / 560
- Opposition parties: Gerindra Party; Golkar (2014–2016); Democratic Party; Prosperous Justice Party; National Mandate Party (2014–2015, 2018–2019)
- Opposition leader: Prabowo Subianto (de facto main opposition leader)

History
- Election: 2014 Indonesian presidential election
- Predecessor: United Indonesia II Cabinet
- Successor: Onward Indonesia Cabinet

The Working Cabinet (Indonesian: Kabinet Kerja) was sworn in on 27 October 2014 by President Joko Widodo.

== History ==
=== Background ===
On 15 September, president-elect Joko Widodo stated that his cabinet would have 34 members, with 18 coming from professional backgrounds and 16 from political parties in his coalition. The cabinet was due to be announced on Wednesday 22 October, and a stage had been prepared at Jakarta's Tanjung Priok harbour, but this event was cancelled at the last minute. The delays were caused by the decision of Joko Widodo to wait for comments from the People's Representative Council. Another reason for the delayed announcement was his decision involve the Indonesian Corruption Eradication Commission (KPK) and the Financial Transaction Reports and Analysis Centre (PPATK) to ensure that prospective ministers did not have poor track records with regards to human rights or corruption. The KPK stated the eight of the original candidates were "problematic" and that alternatives should be found. One candidate for the post of co-ordinating minister for security affairs, Wiranto was seen as having a problematic human rights record, and was not included in the final line up.

=== First appointment ===
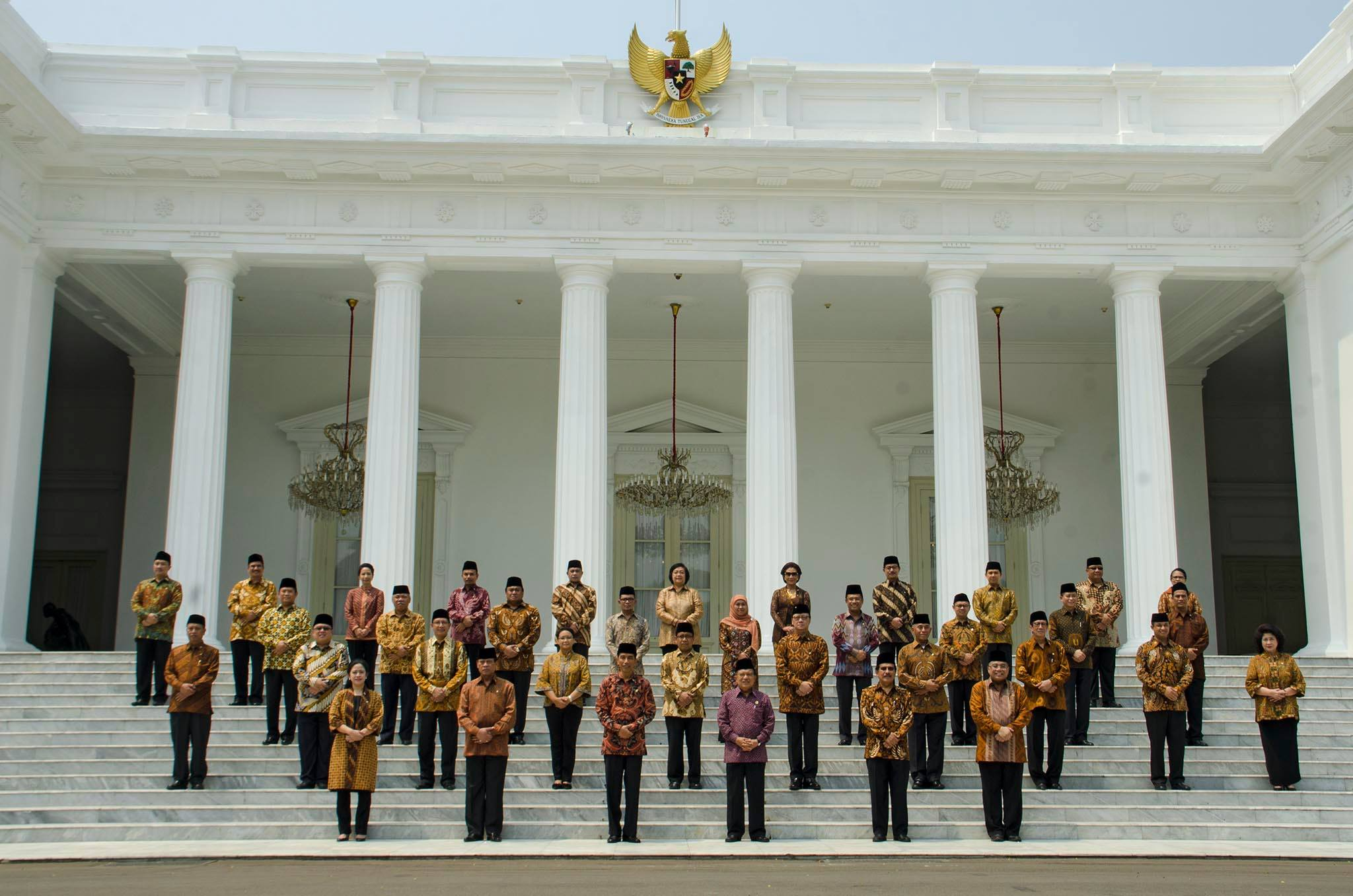
Initial line-up of the cabinet in 2014

The cabinet line-up was announced on Sunday, 26 October 2014 and was sworn in on Monday, 27 October 2014. The cabinet consists of 34 ministers, 14 of whom are affiliated to their respective political parties. There are 26 men and eight women (including the country's first female foreign minister), with 20 ministers being under 45 years old at the time of their appointment. A member of the president's transitional team explained that unlike previous cabinets, Jokowi would not be appointing a cabinet secretary or a presidential spokesman. In another break with tradition, Jokowi did not name the attorney general or head of the Indonesian State Intelligence Agency.

=== Reshuffles ===
Jokowi reshuffled his cabinet on 12 August 2015 at the Presidential Palace, replacing five ministers and the cabinet secretary.

A second and more substantial cabinet reshuffle took place on 27 July 2016 with 13 ministers and the cabinet secretary being replaced. New ministers from Golkar (Party of Functional Groups) and PAN (National Mandate Party) were introduced as part of the reshuffle, showing their entry into Jokowi's coalition government after previously being in opposition.

A third reshuffle occurred on 17 January 2018, replacing Khofifah Indar Parawansa (who resigned) with Idrus Marham and Teten Masduki with Moeldoko.

== Lineup ==
=== Heads of the cabinet ===
President	Vice President
Joko Widodo	Jusuf Kalla

=== Coordinating ministers ===
Portfolio	Minister	Took office	Left office	Party	Ref
Coordinating Minister of Political, Legal, and Security Affairs	Tedjo Edhy Purdijatno	27 October 2014	12 August 2015	NasDem	Chief of Staff of the Navy (2008–2009)
Coordinating Minister of Political, Legal, and Security Affairs	Luhut Binsar Panjaitan	12 August 2015	27 July 2016	Golkar	Chief of Presidential Staff (2014–2015)
Coordinating Minister of Political, Legal, and Security Affairs	Wiranto	27 July 2016	20 October 2019	Hanura	Coordinating Minister of Political, Social, and Security Affairs (1999–2000)
Coordinating Minister of Economic Affairs	Sofyan Djalil	27 October 2014	12 August 2015	Independent	Minister of State-Owned Enterprises (2007–2009)
Coordinating Minister of Economic Affairs	Darmin Nasution	12 August 2015	20 October 2019	Independent	Governor of Bank Indonesia (2010–2013)
Coordinating Minister of Maritime Affairs	Indroyono Soesilo	27 October 2014	12 August 2015	Independent	FAO executive
Coordinating Minister of Maritime Affairs	Rizal Ramli	12 August 2015	27 July 2016	Independent	Coordinating Minister of Economic, Financial, and Industrial Affairs (1999–2001)
Coordinating Minister of Maritime Affairs	Luhut Binsar Pandjaitan	27 July 2016	20 October 2019	Golkar	Coordinating Minister of Political, Legal, and Security Affairs (2015–2016)
Coordinating Minister of Human Development and Culture	Puan Maharani	27 October 2014	1 October 2019	PDI-P	Chairman of PDI-P Fraction at the DPR (2009–2014)
Coordinating Minister of Human Development and Culture	Darmin Nasution (acting)	1 October 2019	20 October 2019	Independent	Governor of Bank Indonesia (2010–2013)

=== Ministers ===
Portfolio	Minister	Took office	Left office	Party	Ref
Minister of State Secretariat	Pratikno	27 October 2014	20 October 2019	Independent	Rector and Professor of political science at Gajah Mada University
Minister of Home Affairs	Tjahjo Kumolo	27 October 2014	20 October 2019	PDI-P	Politician, Member of DPR (1987–2014)
Minister of Foreign Affairs	Retno Marsudi	27 October 2014	20 October 2019	Independent	Ambassador of Indonesia to the Netherlands (2011–2015)
Minister of Defense	Ryamizard Ryacudu	27 October 2014	20 October 2019	Independent	Chief of Staff of the Army (2002–2004)
Minister of Law and Human Rights	Yasonna Laoly	27 October 2014	30 September 2019	PDI-P	Politician, Member of DPR (2004–2009)
Minister of Law and Human Rights	Tjahjo Kumolo (acting)	1 October 2019	20 October 2019	PDI-P	Politician, Member of DPR (1987–2014)
Minister of Finance	Bambang Brodjonegoro	27 October 2014	27 July 2016	Independent	Deputy Minister of Finance (2013–2014)
Minister of Finance	Sri Mulyani	27 July 2016	20 October 2019	Independent	Managing director of World Bank (2010–2016), Minister of Finance (2005–2010)
Minister of Energy and Mineral Resources	Sudirman Said	27 October 2014	27 July 2016	Independent	Director of PT Pindad (Persero)
Minister of Energy and Mineral Resources	Arcandra Tahar	27 July 2016	15 August 2016	Independent	President of Petroneering
Minister of Energy and Mineral Resources	Luhut Binsar Pandjaitan (acting)	15 August 2016	14 October 2016	Golkar	Coordinating Minister Of Maritime Affairs (ad interim)
Minister of Energy and Mineral Resources	Ignasius Jonan	14 October 2016	20 October 2019	Independent	Minister of Transportation (2014–2016)
Minister of Industry	Saleh Husin	27 October 2014	27 July 2016	Hanura	Politician, Member of DPR (2009–2014)
Minister of Industry	Airlangga Hartarto	27 July 2016	20 October 2019	Golkar	Politician, Member of DPR (2014–2016)
Minister of Trade	Rachmad Gobel	27 October 2014	12 August 2015	Independent	Chairman of PT Gobel International
Minister of Trade	Thomas Lembong	12 August 2015	27 July 2016	Independent	CEO of Quvat Management Pte Ltd
Minister of Trade	Enggartiasto Lukita	27 July 2016	20 October 2019	NasDem	Member of DPR (2014–2016)
Minister of Agriculture	Amran Sulaiman	27 October 2014	20 October 2019	Independent	CEO of PT. Tiran Group
Minister of Environment and Forestry	Siti Nurbaya Bakar	27 October 2014	20 October 2019	NasDem	Secretary General of the DPD (2006–2013)
Minister of Transportation	Ignasius Jonan	27 October 2014	27 July 2016	Independent	CEO of Kereta Api Indonesia (2009–2014)
Minister of Transportation	Budi Karya Sumadi	27 July 2016	20 October 2019	Independent	CEO of Angkasa Pura II
Minister of Maritime Affairs and Fisheries	Susi Pudjiastuti	27 October 2014	20 October 2019	Independent	CEO of Susi Air
Minister of Manpower	Hanif Dhakiri	27 October 2014	20 October 2019	PKB	Politician, Member of DPR (2009–2014)
Minister of Public Works and People's Housing	Basuki Hadimuljono	27 October 2014	20 October 2019	Independent	Director General of Spatial Planning, Ministry of Public Works, Ministry of Public Works
Minister of Health	Nila Moeloek	27 October 2014	20 October 2019	Independent	Indonesian representative for Millennium Development Goals
Minister of Education and Culture	Anies Baswedan	27 October 2014	27 July 2016	Independent	Rector of Paramadina University; Chairman of Gerakan Indonesia Mengajar Foundation
Minister of Education and Culture	Muhadjir Effendy	27 July 2016	20 October 2019	Independent	Rector of Muhammadiyah University of Malang
Minister of Land and Spatial Planning (Chairperson of National Land Agency)	Ferry Mursyidan Baldan	27 October 2014	27 July 2016	NasDem	Member of DPR (1997–2009)
Minister of Land and Spatial Planning (Chairperson of National Land Agency)	Sofyan Djalil	27 July 2016	20 October 2019	Independent	Minister of National Development Planning (2015–2016)
Minister of Social Affairs	Khofifah Indar Parawansa	27 October 2014	17 January 2018	PKB	Politician, State Minister of Female Empowerment (1999–2001)
Minister of Social Affairs	Idrus Marham	17 January 2018	24 August 2018	Golkar	Politician, Member of DPR (2009–2011)
Minister of Social Affairs	Agus Gumiwang Kartasasmita	24 August 2018	20 October 2019	Golkar	Politician, Member of DPR (2009–2018)
Minister of Religious Affairs	Lukman Hakim Saifuddin	27 October 2014	20 October 2019	PPP	Minister of Religious Affairs (2014)
Minister of Communication and Information Technology	Rudiantara	27 October 2014	20 October 2019	Independent	Independent commissioner of Indosat
Minister of Research, Technology, and Higher Education	Mohamad Nasir	27 October 2014	20 October 2019	Independent	Rector-elect of Diponegoro University; Professor of Behavioral & Management Accounting
Minister of Cooperatives and Small and Medium Enterprises	Anak Agung Gede Ngurah Puspayoga	27 October 2014	20 October 2019	PDI-P	Vice Governor of Bali (2008–2013)
Minister of Female Empowerment and Child Protection	Yohana Yembise	27 October 2014	20 October 2019	Independent	Professor of Linguistics at Cenderawasih University
Minister of State Apparatus Utilization and Bureaucratic Reform	Yuddy Chrisnandi	27 October 2014	27 July 2016	Hanura	Politician, Member of DPR (2004–2014)
Minister of State Apparatus Utilization and Bureaucratic Reform	Asman Abnur	27 July 2016	15 August 2018	PAN	Member of DPR (2004–2016)
Minister of State Apparatus Utilization and Bureaucratic Reform	Syafruddin	15 August 2018	20 October 2019	Independent	Indonesian National Police Deputy Chief
Minister of Village, Underdeveloped Regions Development, and Transmigration	Marwan Jafar	27 October 2014	27 July 2016	PKB	Member of DPR (2004–2014)
Minister of Village, Underdeveloped Regions Development, and Transmigration	Eko Putro Sandjojo	27 July 2016	20 October 2019	PKB	Businessman
Minister of National Development Planning (Chairperson of National Development Planning Agency)	Andrinof Chaniago	27 October 2014	12 August 2015	Independent	Lecturer at Political Science Department at the University of Indonesia
Minister of National Development Planning (Chairperson of National Development Planning Agency)	Sofyan Djalil	12 August 2015	27 July 2016	Independent	Coordinating Minister for Economic Affairs (2014–2015)
Minister of National Development Planning (Chairperson of National Development Planning Agency)	Bambang Brodjonegoro	27 July 2016	20 October 2019	Independent	Minister of Finance (2014-2016)
Minister of State Owned Enterprises	Rini Soemarno	27 October 2014	20 October 2019	Independent	Minister of Industry & Trade (2001–2004)
Minister of Tourism	Arief Yahya	27 October 2014	20 October 2019	Independent	CEO of Telkom Indonesia
Minister of Youth and Sports Affairs	Imam Nahrawi	27 October 2014	19 September 2019	PKB	Member of DPR (2004–2014)
Minister of Youth and Sports Affairs	Hanif Dhakiri (acting)	20 September 2019	20 October 2019	PKB	Minister of Manpower (ad interim)

=== Deputy ministers ===
Portfolio	Minister	Took office	Left office	Party	Ref
Deputy Minister of Finance	Mardiasmo	27 October 2014	20 October 2019	Independent	Head of Development Finance Comptroller (BPKP)
Deputy Minister of Foreign Affairs	Abdurrahman Mohammad Fachir	27 October 2014	20 October 2019	Independent	Ambassador of Indonesia to Saudi Arabia
Deputy Minister of Energy and Mineral Resources	Arcandra Tahar	14 October 2016	20 October 2019	Independent	Minister of Energy and Mineral Resources (2016)

=== Other positions ===
Portfolio	Minister	Took office	Left office	Party	Ref
Cabinet Secretary	Andi Widjajanto	3 November 2014	12 August 2015	Independent	Military and political observer
Cabinet Secretary	Pramono Anung	12 August 2015	20 October 2019	PDI-P	Former Deputy Speaker of People's Representative Council 2009–2014
Chief of Presidential Staff	Luhut Binsar Pandjaitan	31 December 2014	12 August 2015	Golkar	Former Coordinating Minister of Political, Legal, and Security Affairs
Chief of Presidential Staff	Teten Masduki	2 September 2015	17 January 2018	Independent	Former social activist involved in public clearinghouse for information about corruption, collusion, and nepotism
Chief of Presidential Staff	Moeldoko	17 January 2018	20 October 2019	Hanura	Commander of the National Armed Forces 2013–2015

== See also ==
- Politics of Indonesia
