= Budi Karya Sumadi =

Indonesian architect and politician

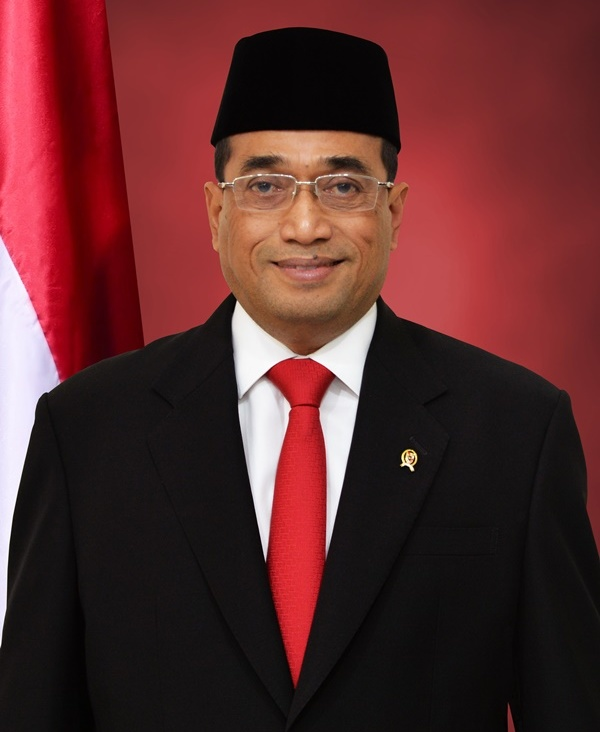

32nd Minister of Transportation
- In office 27 July 2016 – 20 October 2024
- President: Joko Widodo
- Preceded by: Ignasius Jonan
- Succeeded by: Dudy Purwagandhi

Personal details
- Born: 18 December 1956 (age 69) Palembang, South Sumatra, Indonesia
- Education: Gadjah Mada University

Budi Karya Sumadi (born 18 December 1956) is an Indonesian architect who served as the Minister of Transportation in Joko Widodo's Working Cabinet (2016–19) and Onward Indonesia Cabinet (2019-24).

Born and raised in Palembang, Sumadi studied architecture at Gadjah Mada University before working at government-owned property companies, eventually becoming CEO, and was transferred to Angkasa Pura. He was eventually appointed transportation minister in 2016.

== Background ==
Sumadi was born in Palembang, South Sumatra on 18 December 1956. His father was a civil servant and his mother a kindergarten teacher, in addition to being a member of South Sumatra's provincial council from 1956-59. Sumadi completed his first 12 years of education in Palembang before moving to Yogyakarta to study architecture at Gadjah Mada University, from which he graduated in 1981.

He is married and has one child.

== Career ==
After getting his bachelor's, Sumadi began to work as a planning architect for PT Pembangunan Jaya Ancol Tbk, a company owned by the Jakarta city government, in 1982. He worked there for 22 years, rising through its ranks and becoming CEO by 2004. He then moved to another Jakarta-owned company, PT Jakarta Propertindo, where he was CEO until 2015. During his time in both companies, he worked on housing and infrastructure projects in Jakarta, including developing the Bintaro Jaya area and constructing low-cost tenements.

In 2015, Sumadi was transferred to Angkasa Pura II – a central-government-owned company that managed airports in western Indonesia. As CEO of AP II, he took on the project of developing Soekarno-Hatta International Airport Terminal 3. In 2015, he went started a dispute with then Transport Minister Ignasius Jonan for refusing to remove Soekarno-Hatta International Airport's general manager following a ground handling error by Lion Air and another over the opening of Terminal 3, where Jonan believed that the terminal was not ready yet.

=== Minister ===
Sumadi was appointed Minister of Transportation to replace Ignasius Jonan during a cabinet reshuffle on 27 July 2016. Two months into being sworn in, Sumadi released a ministerial regulation for online transportation companies such as Go-Jek, Grab, and Uber – covering licensing and regulation of drivers and vehicles, in addition to banning the use of cars with less than 1,300 cc capacity – which received backlash and resulted in demonstrations by online transportation drivers. In 2018, he further required Go-Jek and Grab to register officially as transport businesses.

He was investigated by the Corruption Eradication Commission in October 2017 following the arrest of the naval transport director-general. He previously made a public apology in August immediately after the arrest.

Following the October 2018 crash of Lion Air flight 610, Sumadi suspended Lion Air's technical director. By a presidential order, Sumadi also conducted a review of airfare, particularly for low-cost carriers. He also promised to impose sanctions on the airline following the completion of the investigation. Sumadi previously issued a warning to Lion Air's management to revamp its safety and scheduling in 2017 following several non-fatal incidents.

== Personal life ==
Budi plays table tennis as a hobby and said he plays for 15–30 minutes every morning. He also plays in a band with other cabinet ministers, dubbed Elek Yo Band. He plays the acoustic guitar and provides vocals.

On 14 March 2020, during the COVID-19 pandemic in Indonesia, he tested positive for COVID-19. Three days later, the government spokesperson for the coronavirus pandemic announced that Sumadi's health was improving.

== Honours ==
- Indonesia:
  - Star of Mahaputera, 2nd Class (11 November 2020)
- Japan:
  - Order of the Rising Sun, 2nd Class, Gold and Silver Star (2024)
