= Suharna Surapranata =

Indonesian politician

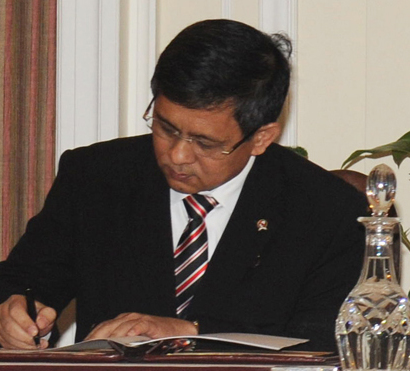
- Suharna in 2011

10th State Minister for Research and Technology
- In office 22 October 2009 – 19 October 2011
- President: Susilo Bambang Yudhoyono
- Preceded by: Kusmayanto Kadiman
- Succeeded by: Gusti Muhammad Hatta (Note: As Minister of Research and Technology)

Personal details
- Born: 13 December 1955 (age 70) Jakarta, Indonesia
- Party: Prosperous Justice Party
- Education: University of Indonesia; Bandung Institute of Technology
- Profession: Physicist; Politician

Suharna Surapranata (born 14 December 1955) is an Indonesian physicist and politician from Bandung, West Java. He served as State Minister for Research and Technology in the Second United Indonesia Cabinet between 2009 and 2011, succeeding Kusmayanto Kadiman, until a reshuffle on 18 October 2011, replaced by Gusti Muhammad Hatta. He is a graduate of the Bandung Institute of Technology and the University of Indonesia.

He is co-founder of the Prosperous Justice Party and served as Chairman of the Central Advisory Council (MPP). He is also co-founder of the Scientists Society of Indonesia (MITI).

== Notes ==
Political offices
Preceded by Kusmayanto Kadiman	State Minister for Research and Technology; 2009–2011	Succeeded by Gusti Muhammad Hatta as Minister of Research and Technology
