= Saleh Husin =

Indonesian politician

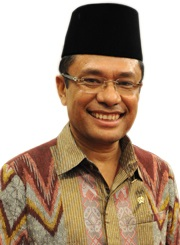

23th Minister of Industry
- In office 27 October 2014 – 27 July 2016
- President: Joko Widodo
- Preceded by: Mohamad Suleman Hidayat
- Succeeded by: Airlangga Hartarto

Personal details
- Born: 20 September 1963 (age 62) Rote, Indonesia

Saleh Husin (born 16 September 1963 in Rote, Indonesia) is an Indonesian politician. He had served as Minister of Industry under the Working Cabinet from the year 2014 until 2016. On 27 July 2016, he was replaced by Airlangga Hartanto.
