= Kusmayanto Kadiman =

Indonesian politician

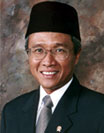
- Official portrait, 2004

9th State Minister for Research and Technology
- In office 21 October 2004 – 20 October 2009
- President: Susilo Bambang Yudhoyono
- Preceded by: Hatta Rajasa
- Succeeded by: Suharna Surapranata

12th Rector of Bandung Institute of Technology
- In office 10 November 2001 – 21 October 2004
- Preceded by: Lilik Hendrajaya
- Succeeded by: Adang Surahman (Acting)

Personal details
- Born: 1 May 1954 (age 72) Bandung, West Java, Indonesia
- Party: Independent
- Education: Bandung Institute of Technology; Australian National University
- Occupation: Engineer; Politician

Kusmayanto Kadiman (born in Bandung, West Java 1 May 1954) is an Indonesian engineer and politician who served as State Minister for Research and Technology in the United Indonesia Cabinet between 2004 and 2009.

== Education ==
He studied engineering physics at Bandung Institute of Technology, graduating in 1977. He received his Doctor of Philosophy (PhD) from Australian National University in 1988.

== Career ==
He has served as head of Pusat Komputer PIKSI, Bandung Institute of Technology and rector of Bandung Institute of Technology from 2001 to 2004. He was appointed as State Minister for Research and Technology in the United Indonesia Cabinet on 21 October 2004, a post he held until 20 October 2009.

== Personal life ==
He is married and has two sons and a daughter.

Political offices
Preceded by Hatta Rajasa	State Minister for Research and Technology; 2004–2009	Succeeded by Suharna Surapranata
Academic offices
Preceded by Lilik Hendrajaya	Rector of Bandung Institute of Technology; 2001–2004	Succeeded by Adang Surahman (Acting); Djoko Santoso
