= Arifin Tasrif =

Indonesian politician

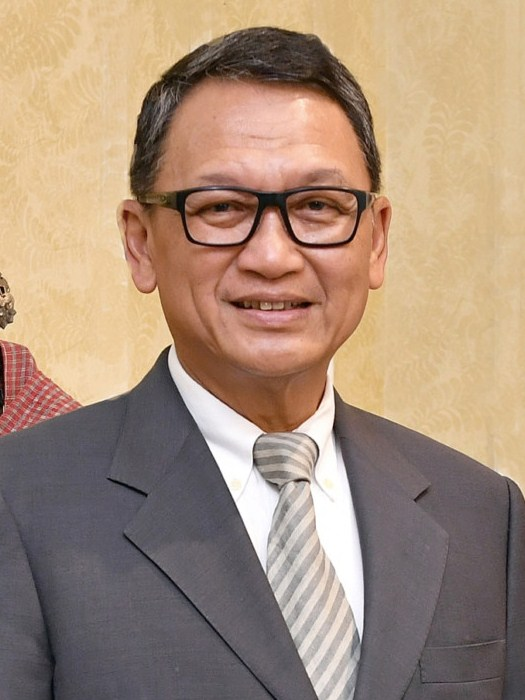
- Portrait in 2019 as minister

18th Minister of Energy and Mineral Resources
- In office 23 October 2019 – 19 August 2024
- President: Joko Widodo
- Preceded by: Ignasius Jonan
- Succeeded by: Bahlil Lahadalia

18th Ambassador of Indonesia to Japan
- In office 13 March 2017 – 23 October 2019
- President: Joko Widodo
- Preceded by: Yusron Ihza Mahendra
- Succeeded by: Heri Akhmadi

Personal details
- Born: 19 June 1953 (age 73) Jakarta, Indonesia
- Education: Bandung Institute of Technology

Arifin Tasrif (born in Jakarta 19 June 1953) is an Indonesian executive who was the Indonesian Minister for Energy & Mineral Resources until a cabinet reshuffle on the 19th of August 2024 in Joko Widodo's Onward Indonesia Cabinet.

== Early life and education ==
Tasrif attended his elementary and secondary schooling in Jakarta. He first (1959) attended the Saint Fransiskus (Francis of Assisi) elementary school in 1959 in Central Jakarta, which was run by the Yayasan St. Fransiskus (Francis of Assisi Foundation). Later, (1965–1968) he attended the nearby Kanisius middle school before entering senior high school in Medan, North Sumatra at the Hope for Education Foundation (Yayasan Pendidikan Harapan). Tasrif studied chemical engineering at the Bandung Institute of Technology, graduating in 1977. He is of Minangkabau descent.

== Business career ==
Tasrif was the business director of the construction and engineering firm Rekayasa Industri between 1995 and 2001, before becoming president director of the fertilizer company Petrokimia Gresik between 2001 and 2010. He then moved to the state-owned Pupuk Indonesia Holding Company. He led the firm until 2015.

== Political career ==
=== Ambassadorship ===
On the 13th of March 2017, Tasrif was appointed Indonesia's Ambassador to Japan and Micronesia by Joko Widodo. Tasrif had previously worked in Japan for two years starting in 1986 as an engineer. During this period, he was involved in the negotiations for a US$20bn contract for a natural gas block with Japanese firm Inpex.

=== Cabinet minister ===
On 23 October 2019, he was appointed the Minister of Energy and Mineral Resources. Tasrif later contracted COVID-19 and on the 4th of February 2022 was temporarily replaced by Bahlil Lahadalia, who became the ad interim minister.
