= Fahmi Idris =

Indonesian politician (1943–2022)

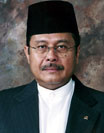

21st Minister of Industry
- In office 5 December 2005 – 20 October 2009
- President: Susilo Bambang Yudhoyono
- Preceded by: Andung A. Nitimiharja
- Succeeded by: Mohamad Suleman Hidayat

20th Minister of Manpower
- In office 21 October 2004 – 5 December 2005
- President: Susilo Bambang Yudhoyono
- Preceded by: Jacob Nuwa Wea
- Succeeded by: Erman Soeparno
- In office 23 May 1998 – 27 September 1999
- President: B.J. Habibie
- Preceded by: Theo L. Sambuaga
- Succeeded by: Bomer Pasaribu

Personal details
- Born: Fahmi Idris; 20 September 1943 Djakarta, Japanese East Indies
- Died: 22 May 2022 (aged 78) Jakarta, Indonesia
- Spouse(s): Kartini Hasan Basri (d. 2014); Yeni Fatmawati (2015–2022)
- Children: 2

Fahmi Idris (20 September 1943 – 22 May 2022) was a prominent Indonesian businessman and politician. He was a Minister of Manpower under the Habibie presidency period. During Yudhoyono's first term of presidency, he became Minister of Industry. In 2005, he was reappointed Minister of Manpower during Yudhoyono's second term.

He received a doctorate title from University of Indonesia as well as appointed an Honorary Professor at State University of Padang.

== Life ==
Fahmi was one of the Minangkabau people who was born in Kenari, Central Jakarta on September 20, 1943. His father, Idris Marah Bagindo, was a trader who migrated from West Sumatra to Jakarta. Fahmi studied at Faculty of Economics University of Indonesia where he was the chairman of the student council.

After becoming an activist during the transition to the New Order era, in the late 1960s he became an entrepreneur. In 1969, he founded PT Kwarta Daya Pratama and joined PT Krama Yudha four years later. In 1978, he co-established Kodel (Kongsi Delapan) Group with Soegeng Saryadi, Aburizal Bakrie, Pontjo Sutowo, and Said Umar Husin, and became president director. The group continuously expanded its business into wide-ranging sectors, such as insurance, chemicals, agribusiness, banking, real estate, and hotels. The groups own the Regent Hotel (now Four Seasons Hotel) and Hotel Ibis Tamarin (both in Jakarta) and the sole agent of Land Rover in Indonesia.

Fahmi was also an accomplished politician. In the Golkar party, he was believed to have a strong and far-reaching patronage network. In 1998, he sat on the central board of the party, and that year was appointed Minister of Manpower and Transmigration. He did not join the cabinet during Abdurrahman Wahid and Megawati presidencies. Under Susilo Bambang Yudhoyono presidency, he returned to the position of Minister of Manpower and Transmigration. In 2005, he survived a cabinet reshuffle and moved on to become Minister for Industry.
