= Jusman Syafii Djamal =

Indonesian politician (born 1954)

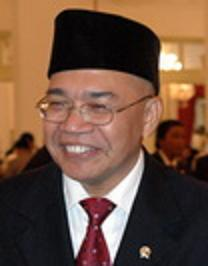
Jusman Syafii Djamal in 2007

Jusman Syafii Djamal (Born in Langsa, East Aceh, Aceh, Indonesia 28 July 1954) is the former Minister of Transportation of Indonesia, serving between 2007 and 2009, and member of National Committee on Innovation (KIN) between 2011 and 2014.
