= Darwin Zahedy Saleh =

Indonesian economist and politician (1960–2025)

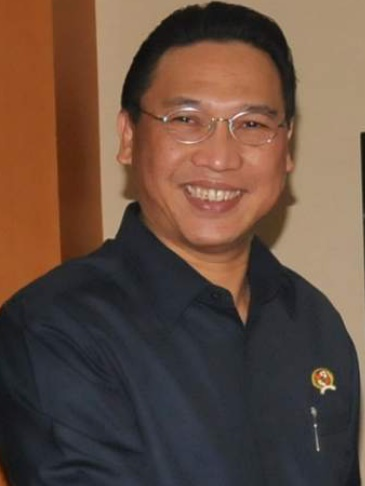

13th Minister of Energy and Mineral Resources of Indonesia
- In office 22 October 2009 – 19 October 2011
- President: Susilo Bambang Yudhoyono
- Preceded by: Purnomo Yusgiantoro
- Succeeded by: Jero Wacik

Personal details
- Born: 29 October 1960 Indragiri Hilir, Riau, Indonesia
- Died: 7 February 2025 (aged 64) Jakarta, Indonesia

Darwin Zahedy Saleh (29 October 1960 – 7 February 2025) was an Indonesian economist. He was part of the Second United Indonesia Cabinet and served as Minister of Energy and Mineral Resources in Indonesia from 22 October 2009 to 19 October 2011. Saleh was a noted academic who was a long-time lecturer at the University of Indonesia and was a financial consultant, manager and banker.

== Life and career ==
Saleh was born in Sapat, Indragiri Hilir on 29 October 1960 to HM Saleh and Hj. Raja Pujian S. He moved to Jakarta at the age of 10 and lived in Kemayoran. He earned an economic science degree at the University of Indonesia. Afterwards, he completed his MBA degree in Middle Tennessee State University and later obtained a doctoral degree from the University of Indonesia.

In 1986, he became a lecturer at the University of Indonesia.

Saleh died in Jakarta, Indonesia on 7 February 2025, at the age of 64.
