= Sugiharto =

Indonesian politician (1955–2021)

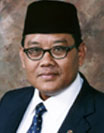
KIB Sugiharto

Sugiharto (sometimes spelled Soegiharto; 29 April 1955 – 15 July 2021) was an Indonesian politician and businessman. He was Minister of State Owned Enterprises from 2004 to 2007 and was deputy chairman of the Indonesian Association of Muslim Intellectuals (ICMI). He died of COVID-19 in 2021.

== Biography ==
Sugiharto was born in Medan, North Sumatra, Indonesia, on 29 April 1955. Although his family originated in Java, they were living in Sumatra due to the Transmigrasi policy. After doing an undergraduate degree at the University of Indonesia, he did a Master of Business Administration at the University of Amsterdam, graduating in 1997. From 1991 to 2004 he was also director of finance and administration at MedcoEnergi.

In 2004, he was appointed by Indonesian president Susilo Bambang Yudhoyono to the position of Minister of State Owned Enterprises as part of the First United Indonesia Cabinet. He was an independent politician not affiliated with any particular party. In May 2007 he was removed from his position in a cabinet shuffle, being replaced by Sofyan Djalil. After his time as minister ended, he returned to the business world and was president-commissioner of Pertamina from 2010 to 2015. He also became deputy chairman of the Indonesian Association of Muslim Intellectuals (ICMI).

In early July 2021 Sugiharto was hospitalized due to COVID-19 infection. He died after nine days in the Pertamina Central Hospital in Jakarta on 15 July 2021.

== Selected publications ==
- BUMN Indonesia: isu, kebijakan, dan strategi (Elex Media Komputindo, 2005)
- Transformasi BUMN: kumpulan pidato terpilih (Penerbit Republika, 2007)
- Peran strategis BUMN: dalam pembangunan ekonomi Indonesia hari ini dan masa depan (Elex Media Komputindo, 2007)
- Transformasi pemikiran kerakyatan Menteri BUMN, 2004–2007: disarikan dari pemikiran dan pidato Sugiharto, Menteri Negara BUMN 2004–2007 di era Kabinet Indonesia Bersatu (Sekolah Pascasarjana UGM, 2010, with Hadi Mustofa Djuraid and M. Fachrie Husein)
