= Purnomo Yusgiantoro =

Indonesian politician (born 1951)

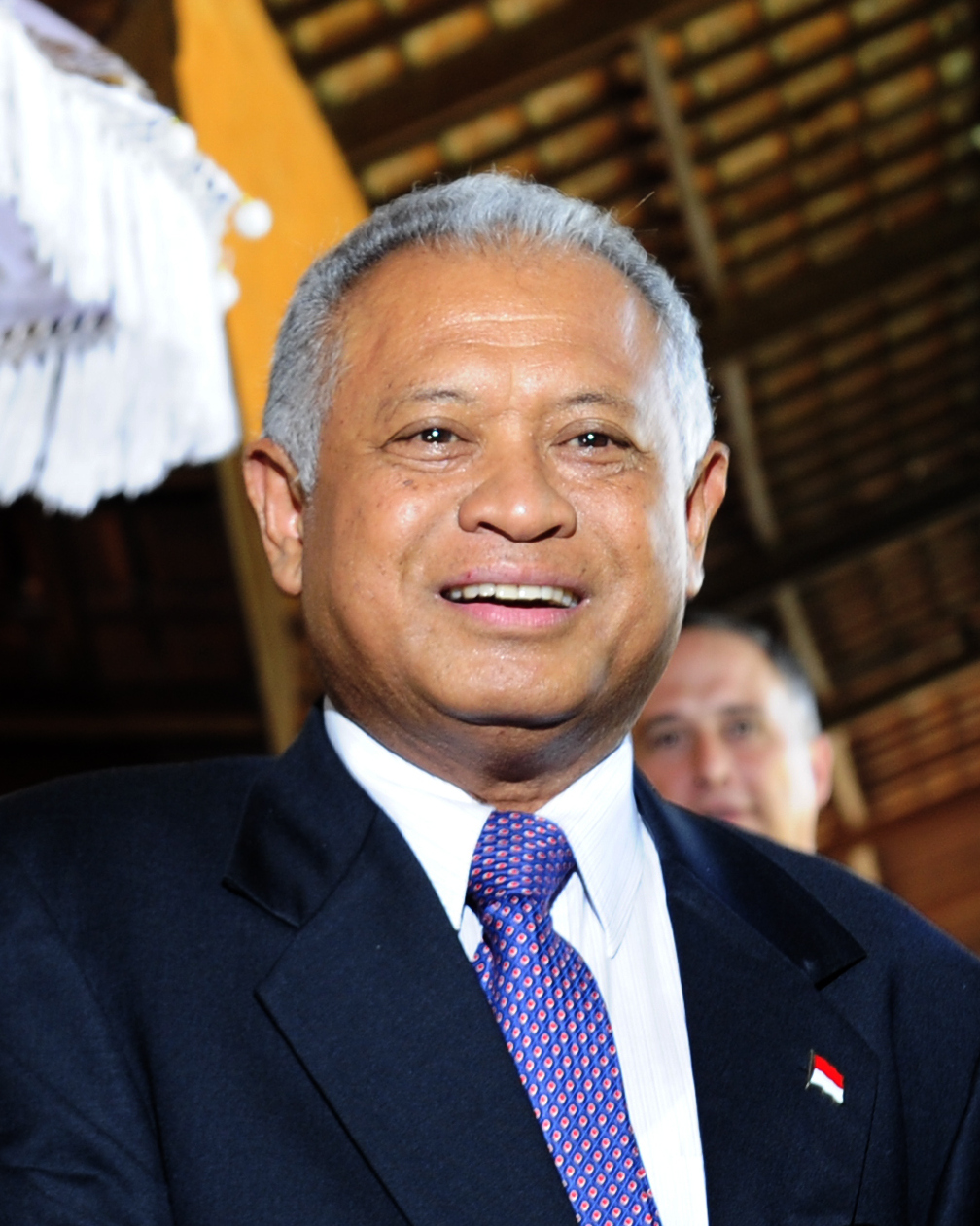
- Yusgiantoro in 2011

24th Minister of Defense
- In office 22 October 2009 – 20 October 2014
- President: Susilo Bambang Yudhoyono
- Deputy: Sjafrie Sjamsoeddin
- Preceded by: Juwono Sudarsono
- Succeeded by: Ryamizard Ryacudu

12th Minister of Energy and Mineral Resources
- In office 23 August 2000 – 20 October 2009
- President: Abdurrahman Wahid; Megawati Sukarnoputri; Susilo Bambang Yudhoyono
- Preceded by: Susilo Bambang Yudhoyono
- Succeeded by: Darwin Zahedy Saleh

24th Secretary General of OPEC
- In office 1 January 2004 – 31 December 2004
- Preceded by: Álvaro Silva Calderón
- Succeeded by: Ahmed Al-Fahad Al-Ahmed Al-Sabah

Personal details
- Born: 16 June 1951 (age 75) Semarang, Central Java, Indonesia
- Party: Independent
- Spouse: Sri Murniati Sachro
- Children: Luky A. Yusgiantoro, PhD; Inka B. Yusgiantoro, PhD; Filda C. Yusgiantoro, PhD
- Education: Bandung Institute of Technology; University of Colorado Boulder; Colorado School of Mines; National Resilience Institute

Purnomo Yusgiantoro (born 16 June 1951 in Semarang, Central Java) is an Indonesian politician. He served as Minister of Defense in the Second United Indonesia Cabinet from 2009 to 2014. Previously, he served as Minister of Energy and Mineral Resources from 2000 to 2009. He also served as secretary-general of OPEC in 2004.

== Early life and education ==
- Loyola College High School, Semarang
- Engineering Degree, Bandung Institute of Technology (ITB), Indonesia, 1974

Engineering Manager, PT BESSINDO, Jakarta, Indonesia 1979–1986

- MA. Economics, University of Colorado Boulder Main Campus, Colorado, United States, 1988.
- MSc., Colorado School of Mines, Golden, Colorado, United States, 1986.
- Ph.D. Mineral/ Natural Resources Economics, Colorado School of Mines at Golden, Colorado, United States, 1988.
- National Defense Institute (Lemhannas), Regular Course (KRA) XXV, First Rank Award Wibawa Seroja Nugraha, 1992.

== Career ==
- Professor of Development Economics Atma Jaya University (2002 ) and Bandung Institute of Technology (2009).
- Chairman of the ASEAN Defence Ministers Meeting (ADMM) (Era of President SBY ) 2011.
- Chairman of the Defence Industry Policy Committee (KKIP) (Era of President SBY), 2010–2014.
- Chairman of the Meeting on the ASEAN Economic Ministers (AMEM)on Energy (Era of President Megawati), 2004.
- Secretary General & President OPEC (Era of President Megawati ), 2001–2004.
- Vice Chairman of the Presidential Decree 133 - Restructuring of National Infrastructure (Era of President Gus Dur/Megawati), 2000–2004.
- Chairman of the Board of Pertamina Commissioners (DKPP)(Era of President Gus Dur/Megawati), 2000–2002.
- Deputy Governor of National Defense Institute (Era of President BJ Habibie), 1998–2000.
- Advisory/Special Staff of the Minister of Mines and Energy, Development Cabinet VI, 1993–1998.
- OPEC Governor, Vienna, Austria, from 1996 to 1998.
- Chairman of Working Group II for the Domestic and Foreign Marketing, Board of Pertamina Commissioners (DKPP), 1993–1998.
- Expert team of PAHs (Adhoc Committee) I, MPR Working Body in preparing the Guidelines Pelita VII, 1997–1998.
- Working Group of the National Security & Defense Council (Wanhankamnas), in preparing the Guidelines Pelita VII.
- Member of the Department of Mines and Energy Committee in Formulating the Guidelines Mining and Energy PELITA VII.
- Lecturer in various leadership courses : LEMHANNAS, SESKOGAB, SUSPIM Pertamina and PLN, SESPANAS, Defense Attache Course Dephankam.
- Chairman/Member of Indonesian Delegation in Multilateral Conferences : APEC, UNCTAD, UNDP, ESCAP, OPEC, Producers - Consumers, ASEAN,
- Chairman/Member of the Delegation of Indonesia Bilateral meeting: Australia, Japan, USA, Norway, South Korea, Taiwan, Canada .
- Consultant for Domestic/International on Natural Resources (NR), Economic Development and Financial Management.

== Publications ==
- Many papers delivered in the sphere of economic development, micro-economic, energy and mineral resources, energy and environment, as well as defense and security
- Authored the book: The Footprints of Time.
- Together with other Authors: Indonesian Economic Analysis and Methodology (Editor DR. Syahrir)
- Authored a book: International Financial Management.
- Authored a book: Energy Economics: Theory and Practice.
- Authored a book: The Indonesian Economy
- Authored a book: Defence Economics: Theory and Practice

== Award/Star Services/Signs of Honor ==
- Awarded 16 Star Services/Honors from the State (Republic of Indonesia) and Foreign Affairs, with the highest service star being a star Adipradana Mahaputra Services.
- Awarded 15 Medals, from various institutions and organisations, domestic and abroad.

Political offices
| Preceded by Susilo Bambang Yudhoyono | Minister of Energy and Mineral Resources; 2000–2009 | Succeeded by Darwin Zahedy Saleh |
| Preceded by Juwono Sudarsono | Minister of Defense; 2009–2014 | Succeeded by Ryamizard Ryacudu |
Other offices
| Preceded by Álvaro Silva Calderón | Secretary General of OPEC; 2004–2004 | Succeeded by Ahmed Al-Fahad Al-Ahmed Al-Sabah |
