= National Committee on Innovation =

Government agency of Indonesia

The National Committee on Innovation (NCI, Indonesian: Komite Inovasi Nasional Republik Indonesia, KIN-RI) was an independent Presidential-level government agency of the President and the office, charged with providing advisory and insights of advanced research, innovation, scientific and technology in various disciplines for the President and the cabinet, through comprehensive national innovation system.

KIN-RI has headquarters at the Presidential Palace complex in Central Jakarta, Jakarta. This agency is officially formed on 20 May 2010, and ratified by Presidential Decree No. 32/2010. It was disbanded on 17 October 2014 by Presidential Decree No. 164/2014.

In 2019, Steering Committee of National Research and Innovation Agency (Indonesian: Badan Riset dan Inovasi Nasional, BRIN) formed as spiritual successor of KIN-RI.

== See also ==
- Presidential Advisory Council
- National Research and Innovation Agency
