= Jejawi =

Mukim and small town in Perlis, Malaysia

Coordinates: 6°26′42.5″N 100°13′57.4″E

- Mukim in Perlis

lain transcription(s)
  - Jawi: ججاوي
  - Chinese: 杰贾威
  - Tamil: ஜெஜாவி
- Interactive map of Jejawi
- Country: Malaysia
- state: Perlis

Population (2010)
  - Total: 7,957

Jejawi is a Mukim and a small town in Perlis, Malaysia. The mukim of Jejawi has an area of 12.36 square kilometres and is administered by Kangar Municipal Council.

Jejawi located in central part of Perlis, bordering the mukim of Padang Pauh, Sena, Ngulang, Arau, Sungai Adam and Utan Aji.

== Demography ==
The population of Jejawi is 7,957 people. The largest etnic group is the Malays, numbering 4,627 people. Indians are numbering at 188 people.

== Facilities ==
- Sekolah Kebangsaan Jejawi
- Pusat Pengajian Pembangunan Insan & Teknokomunikasi (iKOM)
