= Ravindra Airlangga =

Indonesian politician (born 1991)

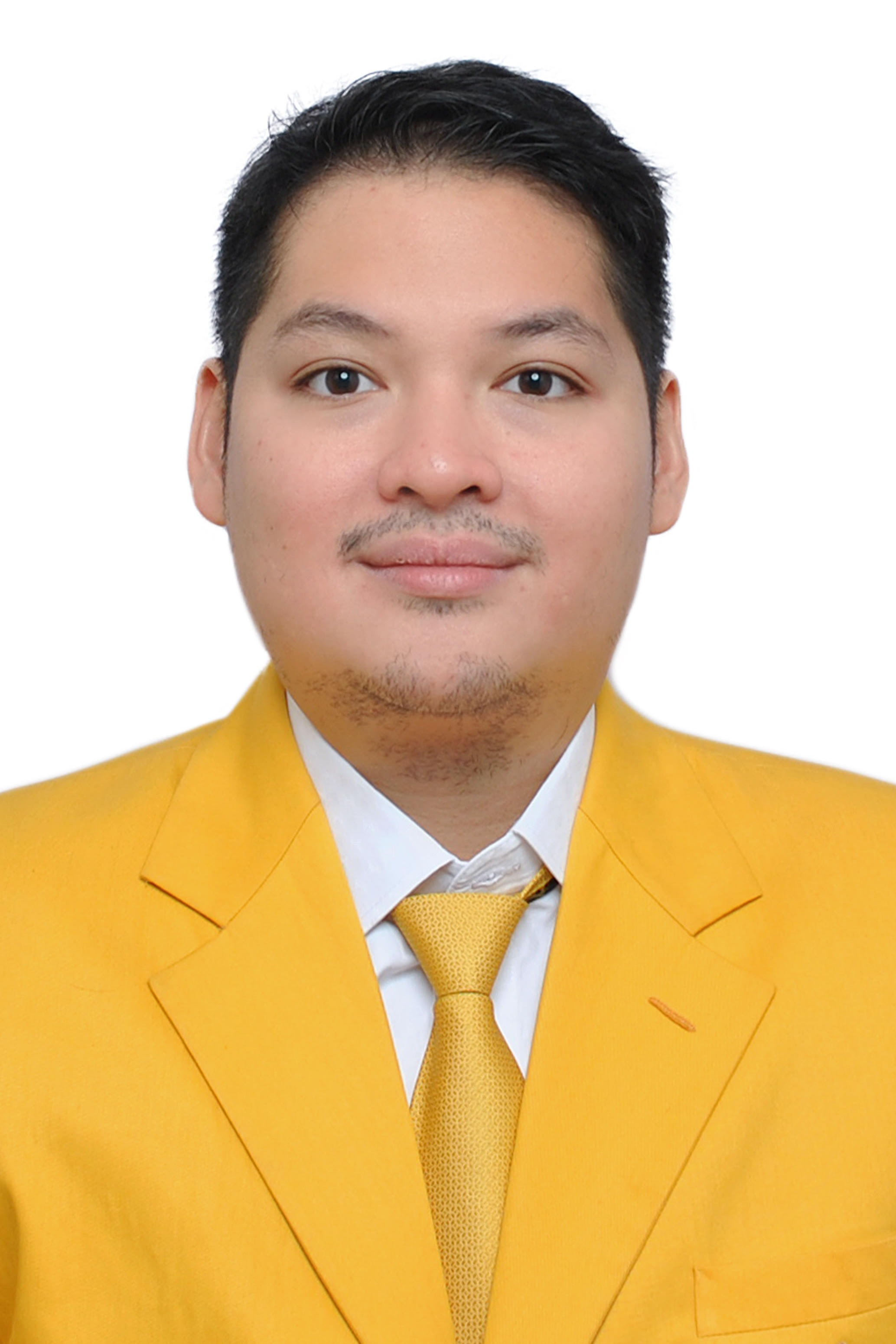
- Ravindra in 2023

Member of the House of Representatives
- Incumbent
- Assumed office 14 June 2022
- Preceded by: Ichsan Firdaus
- Constituency: West Java V

Personal details
- Born: 28 August 1991 (age 34)
- Party: Golkar
- Parent: Airlangga Hartarto (father)
- Relatives: Hartarto Sastrosoenarto (grandfather)

Ravindra Airlangga (born 28 August 1991) is an Indonesian politician serving as a member of the House of Representatives since 2022. He is the son of Airlangga Hartarto and the grandson of Hartarto Sastrosoenarto.
