= Indonesian State College of Accountancy =

Indonesian State Polytechnic of Finance
- Politeknik Keuangan Negara STAN
- Former names: Institut Ilmu Keuangan, Sekolah Tinggi Akuntansi Negara
- Motto: Nagara Dana Rakca (Sanskrit)
- Motto in English: "Guardian of State Finance"
- Type: State Polytechnic
- Established: 1964
- Affiliations: Ministry of Finance of the Republic of Indonesia
- Director: Evy Mulyani, Ak., M.B.A., Ph.D. CA, CACP, CRGP
- Location: Tangerang Selatan, Banten, Indonesia
- Campus: Suburban - Bintaro Jaya Sector V
- Website: pknstan.ac.id

STAN Polytechnic of State Finance (Indonesian: Politeknik Keuangan Negara STAN; abbreviated as PKN STAN), is a government-affiliated college in Indonesia, located in Banten, in Bintaro Sector V Tangerang Selatan. It offers undergraduate degrees in finance. The curriculum is focused on public finance, with an emphasis on government policy and regulation. Upon completion of their study, PKN STAN graduates serve in government institutions in Indonesia especially in the Ministry of Finance of the Republic of Indonesia (Directorate General of Taxes, Directorate of Customs and Excise, etc.). The current PKN STAN director is Evy Mulyani, Ak., M.B.A., Ph.D. CA, CACP, CRGP.

== Government affiliation ==
PKN STAN is a government-affiliated college which means that the college is administered and funded by the government of Indonesia through the institution it is affiliated to. The government institution affiliated to PKN STAN is the Ministry of Finance of the Republic of Indonesia. This affiliation with the government results in cost of education not being charged to the students of the college. In return, the graduates of the college are obliged to serve in government institutions in Indonesia. The Ministry of Finance of the Republic of Indonesia gets the largest number of graduates every year. The other government institutions get a portion of the college graduates allocation are the Government Accountability Office of the Republic of Indonesia (Badan Pemeriksa Keuangan Republik Indonesia/ BPK RI)and the Financial and Development Supervisory Agency (Badan Pengawasan Keuangan dan Pembangunan / BPKP). In previous years, there is a record of allocation of graduates to the Ministry of State-Owned Enterprise of Indonesia.
