= Airlangga Hartarto =

Indonesian politician and businessman

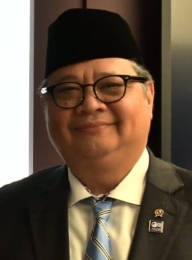
- Airlangga in 2026

Coordinating Minister for Economic Affairs
- Incumbent
- Assumed office 23 October 2019
- President: Joko Widodo; Prabowo Subianto
- Deputy: Dradjad Hari Wibowo (2026–present)
- Preceded by: Darmin Nasution

24th Minister of Industry
- In office 27 July 2016 – 20 October 2019
- President: Joko Widodo
- Preceded by: Saleh Husin
- Succeeded by: Agus Gumiwang Kartasasmita

11th General Chairman of Golkar
- In office 13 December 2017 – 10 August 2024
- Secretary-General: Lodewijk Freidrich Paulus
- Preceded by: Setya Novanto
- Succeeded by: Agus Gumiwang Kartasasmita (acting); Bahlil Lahadalia

Member of the House of Representatives
- In office 1 October 2004 – 27 July 2016
- Preceded by: Constituency established
- Succeeded by: Nawafie Saleh
- Constituency: West Java IV (2004–2009); West Java V (2009–2016)

Personal details
- Born: 1 October 1962 (age 64) Surabaya, East Java, Indonesia
- Party: Golkar
- Spouse: Yanti K. Isfandiary
- Relations: Hartarto Sastrosoenarto (father)
- Children: 8, including Ravindra
- Education: Gadjah Mada University (BS); Monash University (MBA); University of Melbourne (MS)

Airlangga Hartarto (born 1 October 1962) is an Indonesian politician and businessman. He is the current Coordinating Minister for Economic Affairs in President Prabowo Subianto's Red and White Cabinet. He was also the chairman of Golkar Party from 2017 to 2024.

== Early life and education ==
Airlangga was born in the East Java capital of Surabaya on 1 October 1962. His father Hartarto Sastrosoenarto, an engineer and politician, served as a minister in various portfolios for former president Suharto for 15 years from 1983 to 1998.

Airlangga was active in the boy scouts, attending national and international jamborees. He completed high school at Kanisius College in Jakarta in 1981. He received a bachelor's degree in mechanical engineering from Gadjah Mada University in 1987. He completed the AMP at Wharton School of the University of Pennsylvania and later received a master's degree in business administration from Monash University as well as a master's degree in management technology from the University of Melbourne. In 2019 he was awarded an honorary doctorate in Development Policy by The KDI School of Public Policy and Management.

== Business career ==
Airlangga has been involved in numerous businesses, ranging from fertilizer distribution to paper packaging and construction machinery. Following are some of his corporate roles.

- Owner of fertilizer distributor PT Graha Curah Niaga.
- President Commissioner and Chairman of PT Fajar Surya Wisesa, a paper packaging manufacturer (1988–2016). The company was founded by Airlangga and Winarko Sulistyo in 1988. Airlangga's older brother Gunadharma in a 1998 email to activist George Aditjondro described the publicly listed company as a "small competitor of Sinar Mas Group".
- President Director of PT Jakarta Prima Cranes (1991).
- Chairman of PT Ciptadana Sekuritas asset management firm (1994). The company was founded in 1990 and is now called PT Ciptadana Capital.
- In 2002, Airlangga resigned from the Board of Directors of Indonesian Investment Fund Limited, an open-ended equity mutual fund launched and run by PT Ciptadana Asset Management. Bermuda-registered Indonesian Investment Fund Limited was among companies listed in the Paradise Papers set of leaked documents related to offshore investments.
- President Director of PT Bisma Narendra (1994). Founded in 1994, the company provides metal coating and allied services.
- Commissioner of PT Sorini Agro Asia Corporindo (2004). The company buys tapioca starch and sells its derivatives.
- President Commissioner of PT Essar Dhananjaya, a manufacturer of steel coils and sheets.
- Commissioner of PT Hitachi Construction Machinery Indonesia.

== Political career ==
=== Early political career ===
Airlangga joined Golkar Party in 1998.

=== House of Representatives ===
In 2004, he became a member of the House of Representatives as a member of Golkar. He served as deputy treasurer of Golkar from 2004 to 2009. In his second term as a legislator in the 2009–2014 period, he chaired House Commission VI on industry, trade, investment and state-owned enterprises. During this time, he introduced the 2014 Industry Law. In his third term as a legislator, which commenced in 2014, he served in House Commission VII on mineral resources, environment, research and technology. In April 2015, he was transferred to Commission X on education, tourism, creative economy, culture, sports and youth. In January 2016, he became a member of Commission XI on financial affairs.

=== Ministerial career ===
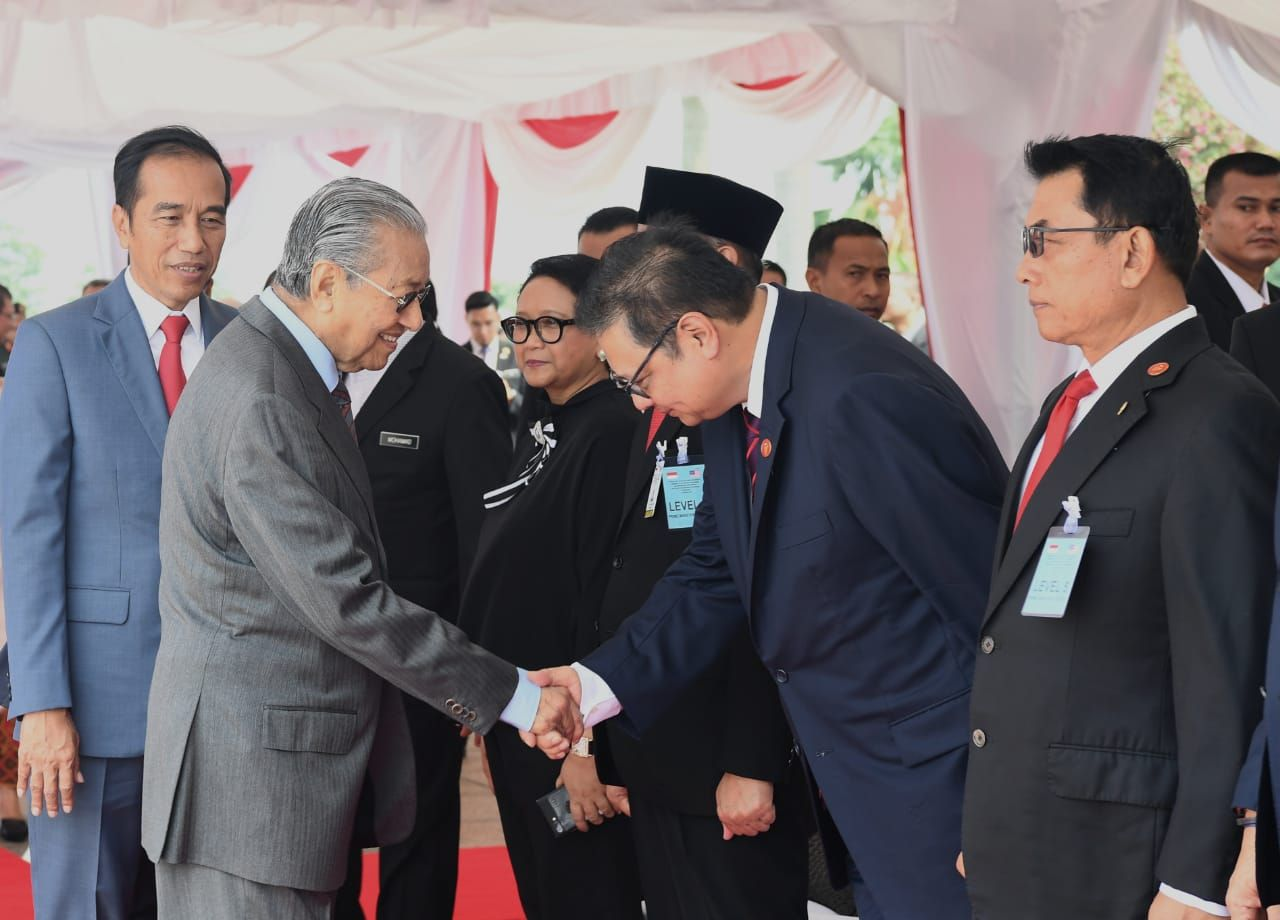
In 2019, Airlangga Hartarto accompanied President Joko Widodo on a visit to Malaysia and shook hands with Malaysian Prime Minister Mahathir Mohamad.

He was appointed to cabinet as industry minister on 27 July 2016 by President Joko Widodo. In 2019, Airlangga returned to Jokowi's Onward Indonesia Cabinet as Coordinating Minister of Economic Affairs.

=== Golkar Party leadership ===
On 13 December 2017, he was selected to become Golkar chairman, replacing Setya Novanto, who had been arrested and put on trial for alleged corruption. Airlangga announced his resignation as the General Chairman of Golkar on 10 August 2024. The position of party's chairman was temporarily held by his vice chairman Agus Gumiwang Kartasasmita, which was appointed on 13 August.

== Personal life ==
Airlangga is the younger brother of businessman Gunadharma Hartarto (1961–2004). His other siblings are Indira Asoka, Gautama and Maya Dewi. Airlangga is married to Yanti K. Isfandiary and they have eight children: Adanti, Ravindra, Audi, Dines, Bianda, Latascha, Maisara and Natalie. 3 out of the 8 children are now married. Airlangga also has 3 grandchildren named Althamis, Ophelia and Endaru.
