= Sofyan Djalil =

Indonesian politician & academic

Dr. Sofyan Djalil S.H., M.A., M.ALD.
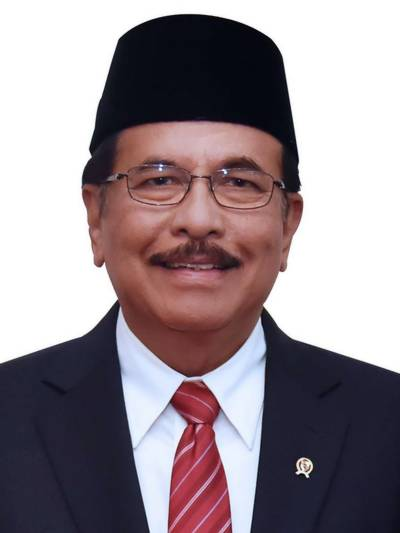

13th Minister of Agrarian and Spatial Planning
- In office 27 July 2016 – 15 June 2022
- President: Joko Widodo
- Vice minister: Surya Tjandra
- Preceded by: Ferry Mursyidan Baldan
- Succeeded by: Hadi Tjahjanto

14th Minister of National Development Planning
- In office 12 August 2015 – 27 July 2016
- President: Joko Widodo
- Preceded by: Andrinof Chaniago
- Succeeded by: Bambang Brodjonegoro

15th Coordinating Ministry for Economic Affairs
- In office 27 October 2014 – 12 August 2015
- President: Joko Widodo
- Preceded by: Chairul Tanjung
- Succeeded by: Darmin Nasution

4th State Minister for State-Owned Enterprises
- In office 9 May 2007 – 20 October 2009
- President: Susilo Bambang Yudhoyono
- Preceded by: Soegiharto
- Succeeded by: Mustafa Abubakar

2nd Minister of Communication and Information
- In office 21 October 2004 – 9 May 2007
- President: Susilo Bambang Yudhoyono
- Preceded by: Syamsul Mu'arif as State Minister of Communication and Information
- Succeeded by: Mohammad Nuh

Head of the National Land Agency
- In office 27 July 2016 – 15 June 2022
- President: Joko Widodo
- Preceded by: Ferry Mursyidan Baldan
- Succeeded by: Hadi Tjahjanto

Personal details
- Born: 23 September 1953 (age 72) East Aceh Regency, Aceh, Indonesia
- Party: Independent
- Education: University of Indonesia; Tufts University

Sofyan Abdul Djalil (born September 23, 1953) is an Indonesian academic, economic legal consultant and politician who was the Minister of Agrarian and Spatial Planning of Indonesia under President Joko Widodo's 2014–2019 Working Cabinet and the Onward Indonesia Cabinet. He has served as State Minister for State-Owned Enterprises in the United Indonesia Cabinet.

From October 2004 to May 2007 Djalil served as Minister of Communication and Information Technology in the same cabinet. From 26 October 2014 to 12 August 2015, he was elected as Coordinating Minister for Economic Affairs in the Working Cabinet 2014–2019 period by President Jokowi, he was then replaced by Darmin Nasution in the reshuffle of the Working Cabinet. Djalil then served as Minister of National Development Planning or Head of Bapennas from 12 August 2015 to 27 July 2016 on Working Cabinet and was replaced by Bambang Brodjonegoro in the second cabinet reshuffle.

== Honours ==
- Indonesia :
  - Star of Mahaputera, 2nd Class (11 August 2014)
  - Star of Bhayangkara, 1st Class (18 December 2020)

== See also ==
- List of longest-serving ministers in Indonesia
