= Jero Wacik =

Indonesian politician

- ᬚᭂᬭᭀᬯᬘᬶᬓ᭄
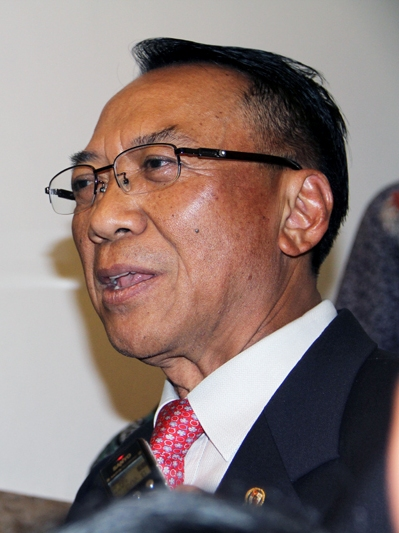

Minister of Energy and Mineral Resources
- In office 19 October 2011 – 11 September 2014
- President: Susilo Bambang Yudhoyono
- Preceded by: Darwin Zahedy Saleh
- Succeeded by: Sudirman Said

Minister of Culture and Tourism
- In office 21 October 2004 – 19 October 2011
- President: Susilo Bambang Yudhoyono
- Preceded by: I Gede Ardhika
- Succeeded by: Mari Elka Pangestu

Personal details
- Born: 24 April 1949 (age 77) Singaraja, Bali, Indonesia
- Party: Democratic Party
- Spouse: Triesnawati
- Education: Bandung Institute of Technology; University of Indonesia

Jero Wacik (Balinese: ᬚᭂᬭᭀᬯᬘᬶᬓ᭄; born 24 April 1949) is an Indonesian politician from Singaraja, Bali. He served as Minister of Culture and Tourism since 21 October 2004 until 19 October 2011. He also served as Minister of Energy and Mineral Resources of Indonesia from 19 October 2011 to 11 September 2014 following his naming as a graft suspect by the Corruption Eradication Commission (KPK). He graduated with a degree in mechanical engineering from the Bandung Institute of Technology in 1974 and the University of Indonesia in 1983. As member of cabinet, he served in one of the highest positions within the Democratic Party.

== Legacy ==
Wacik was convicted of embezzlement and sentenced by the Anti Corruption Court to four years in prison.
