= Stella Christie =

Indonesian academic and politician (born 1979)

- 蔣黛蘭
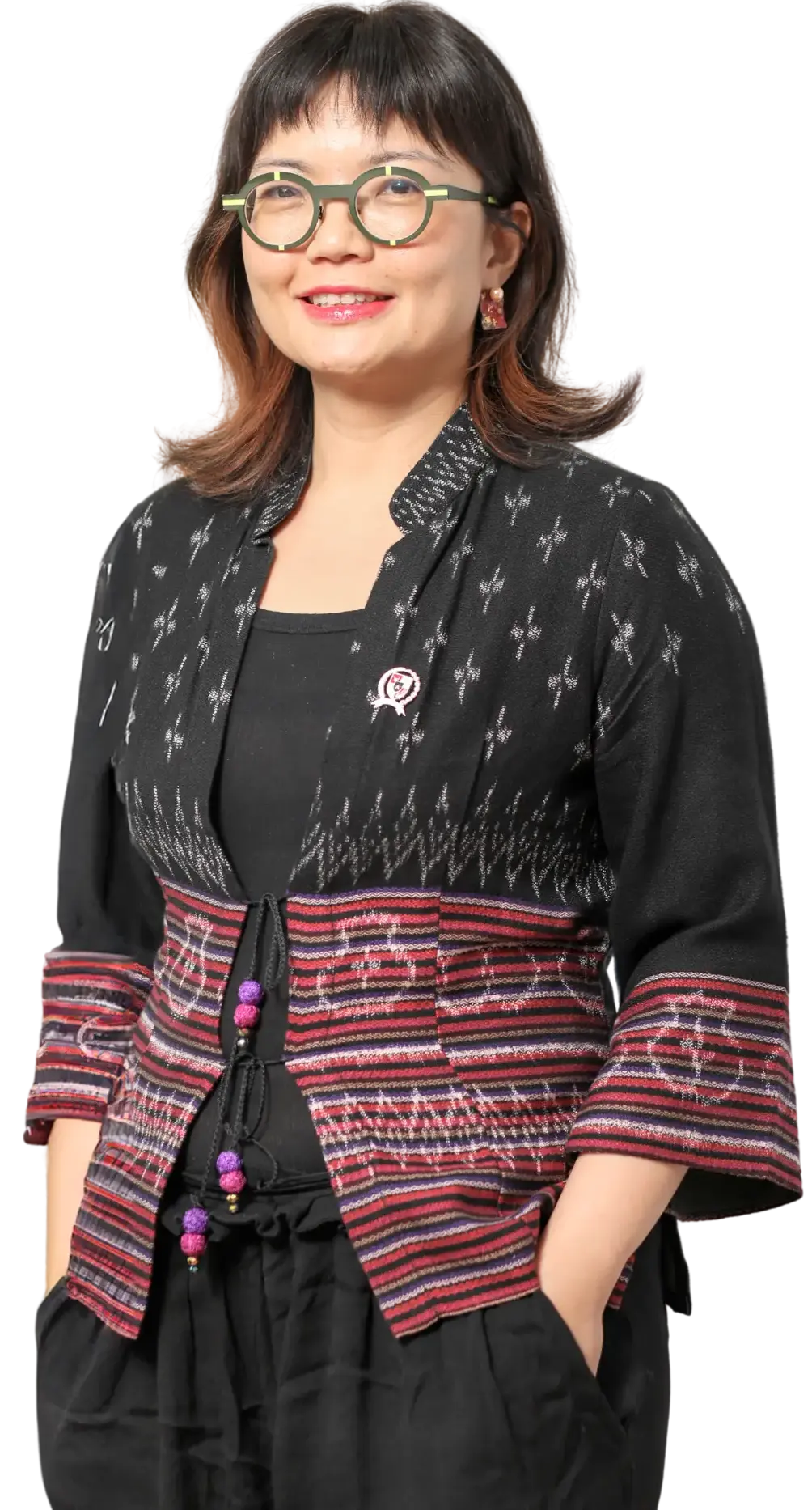
- Christie in 2024

Deputy Minister of Higher Education, Science, and Technology
- Incumbent
- Assumed office 21 October 2024 Serving with Fauzan
- President: Prabowo Subianto
- Minister of Higher Education, Science, and Technology: Satryo Soemantri Brodjonegoro; Brian Yuliarto
- Preceded by: office established

President Commissioner of Pertamina Hulu Energi
- Incumbent
- Assumed office 15 July 2025
- Preceded by: Rinaldi Firmansyah

Personal details
- Born: January 11, 1979 (age 47) Medan, North Sumatera, Indonesia
- Party: Independent
- Spouse: Bartlomiej Czech (m. 2010)
- Children: 1
- Education: UWC Red Cross Nordic; Harvard University (BA); Northwestern University (PhD)
- Scientific career
- Fields: Cognitive science
- Workplaces: University of British Columbia Swarthmore College Stanford University Tsinghua University
- Thesis: How Simple is Same: The Relational Match to Sample Task in Children (2010)
- Doctoral advisor: Dedre Gentner

Stella Christie (born January 11 1979) is an academic and cognitive scientist from Medan, North Sumatra who currently serves as the Indonesian Deputy Minister of Higher Education, Science, and Technology. She earned her Bachelor's degree from Harvard University and her PhD from Northwestern University in cognitive psychology. She is a professor at Tsinghua University, where she also holds the position of Chair at the Tsinghua Laboratory of Brain and Intelligence and Director of the Child Cognition Center. She is also a member of the Governing Board for the Cognitive Science Society and plays an active role as a science and education advisor to the Indonesian government.

== Early life and education ==
Stella Christie was born in Medan on January 11 1979, and was raised in Jakarta. She completed her primary and secondary education at St Ursula School, an all-female Catholic school in Central Jakarta. During her education, she received several prestigious scholarships, including the ASEAN Scholarship from the Singapore Government and a scholarship from the United World College to continue her education at the Red Cross Nordic United World College in Norway. In 1999, she received a full scholarship from Harvard University and graduated magna cum laude in 2004 and continued her doctoral studies at Northwestern University, earning her PhD in 2010.

After completing postdoctoral research at the University of British Columbia, she moved back to the United States to take a tenure-track Assistant Professor role at Swarthmore College and was appointed tenured associate professor in 2018. In the same year, with offers from various universities in the United States, Singapore, and China, she moved to Tsinghua University, where she was appointed Full Professor in 2022.
