= Directorate General of Higher Education =

Government agency of Indonesia

- Direktorat Jenderal Pendidikan Tinggi

Agency overview
- Formed: August 1, 1966 (first iteration); August 26, 1974 (second iteration); December 18, 2019 (current iteration)
- Preceding agencies: First iteration: Department of Higher Education; Second iteration: Directorate General of Education; Third iteration: Ministry of Research, Technology and Higher Education
- Dissolved: April 28, 1969 (first iteration); January 23, 2015 (second iteration)
- Superseding agencies: First iteration: Directorate General of Education; Second iteration: Ministry of Research, Technology and Higher Education
- Headquarters: Senayan, Jakarta, Indonesia; 6°13′27″S 106°48′12″E
- Employees: 110,378 (2020) (Note: Consists of 286 employees working at the directorate general and 110.092 employees working as permanent academic staff in public universities.)
- Annual budget: Rp 7,000,000,000,000 (2024)
- Agency executives: Khairul Munadi, Director General; Tjitjik Sri Tjahjandarie, Acting Secretary; Sri Suning Kusumawardani, Director of Learning and Student Affairs; vacant, Director of Institutional Affairs; Lukman, Director of Resources
- Parent agency: Ministry of Higher Education, Science, and Technology

The Directorate General of Higher Education (Indonesian: Direktorat Jenderal Pendidikan Tinggi) is a directorate general under the Ministry of Higher Education, Science, and Technology. Originally established in 1966, the directorate general has undergone several disestablishments and reorganizations, with the current iteration being established on 18 December 2019. The directorate general is responsible for the management and supervision of universities, institutes, polytechnic, and academies in Indonesia.

== History ==
=== Pre-establishment ===
Since the independence of Indonesia in 1945, higher education has been administered by the higher education bureau (Indonesian: Biro Perguruan Tinggi) inside the Ministry (later renamed to Department) of Education and Culture. The status of the bureau was upgraded as the higher education service (Indonesian: Djawatan Perguruan Tinggi), and later as the bureau for higher education coordination (Indonesian: Biro Koordinasi Perguruan Tinggi). The latter existed for most of the 1950s and was responsible in enrolling former student soldiers who fought in the Indonesian National Revolution to universities and managing foreign scholarships. The coordination bureau was chaired by Soegiono Djoened Poesponegoro, who was the dean of the medicine faculty of the Hasanuddin University.

Due to its status in the Ministry of Education and Culture, the higher education bureau had to compete with other, larger bureau for funding. The lack of funding made rectors and heads of universities felt neglected, and they proposed the higher education bureau to be upgraded to a department under a minister. This notion was supported by the chief of the national planning council, Mohammad Yamin, who proposed the education and culture department to be separated into three departments: Department of Basic Education, Department of Higher Education, and Department of Culture. However, the minister of education and culture Prijono was strongly against this notion, as he considered that Indonesia's multiparty nature could result in differing interpretations of government policies.

The bargaining power of the rectors and heads of universities increased as the number of private and public universities in Indonesia grow in number over the half decade of 1955 to 1960. The Department of Higher Education was established on 14 April 1961, with its first minister appointed a month prior. The new department is responsible for regulating, organizing, guiding, and supervising all higher education institutions. The bureau for higher education coordination was placed under the department as the directorate for higher education. The directorate consist of four sections: higher education development, student affairs, foreign higher education, and administration. The department underwent another reorganization in the Second Revised Dwikora Cabinet, with the higher education established as its own department headed by a deputy minister. Similar to the pre-1961 organization, the department was placed under the ministry of education and culture.

=== First iteration (1966–1969) ===
The Ampera Cabinet, the first cabinet under the direct control of President Suharto, reorganized the structure of the cabinet. Ministries were renamed to department, while the department that were previously under the ministries were renamed to directorate general. The directorate general of higher education (Indonesian: Direktorat Jenderal Perguruan Tinggi) was formally established along with the directorate general in other ministries on 1 August 1966. Mashuri Saleh, who was previously the deputy minister for higher education, was named as the director general.

The Decree of the Cabinet Presidium No. 15 of 1966, dated 3 November 1966, established the organization of the directorate general. The directorate general consists of a secretariat and five directorates:

1. Secretariat of the Directorate General: consists of the general, relations with state institutions/functional, public relations, legal, and supervision section
2. Directorate of Higher Education: consists of the curriculum development, research, teaching equipment, private and civil service college, and diploma assessment service
3. Directorate of Community Service: consists of the higher education community service, seminar and conference, foreign relations, and productive projects service
4. Directorate of Development: consists of the general, finance, equipment, construction, and planning, statistics, and documentation service
5. Directorate of Higher Education Personnel: consists of the educative personnel, administrative personnel, personnel development, personnel placement, and personnel welfare service
6. Directorate of Student Affairs: consists of the organization, student welfare, student community service, and the technical and mandatory exercise service

The directorate general at that time was responsible, among other things, for the political screening of students who were involved in the 30 September Movement or affiliated with the banned Communist Party of Indonesia.

In June 1968, the Director General of Higher Education Mashuri Saleh was named as the Minister of Education and Culture. Several months later, on 28 April 1969 President Suharto issued a decree that merged the Directorate General of Basic Education and the Directorate General of Higher Education into the Directorate General of Education.

=== Second iteration (1974–2014) ===
From 1969 to 1975, the higher education portofolio existed as a directorate under the Directorate General of Education. In 1974, the Director General of Education Makaminan Makagiansar prepared plans to separate the directorate general into two again: the directorate general of higher education and the directorate general of basic and secondary education. Unlike the previous directorate general, which only supervises universities and other higher education institutions, the second iteration of the directorate general was also tasked to develop the national higher education system. Makagiansar was appointed as the director general of higher education in late 1974, and the establishment of the Directorate General of Higher Education (Indonesian: Direktorat Jenderal Pendidikan Tinggi) was formalized with the Presidential Decree No. 45 of 1974, dated 26 August 1974. The new directorate general consists of a secretariat and four directorate: academic facilities development, research and community service development, student affairs, and private higher education. All of the directors were appointed by Makagiansar, while the Minister of Education and Culture appointed the secretary and the director for student affairs. The internal structure of the directorate general was confirmed with a minister's decree in 1980.

The directorate general underwent a major reorganization in 2000. The directorate of academic facilities development and directorate general of student affairs were merged to form the directorate of academic and student affairs development. Two new directorates, the directorate of education development of educational staff and personnel and the directorate of institutional and societal involvement development, was established on the same occasion.

By 2012, several directorates inside the directorate generals had been renamed. The directorate of academic and student affairs development was changed into the directorate of learning and student affairs, while the directorate of institutional and societal involvement development was renamed to the directorate of institution and cooperation, and the directorate of education development of educational staff and personnel was renamed to the directorate of lecturers and educational staff. The structure of the directorate general now consists of:

- Secretariat of the Directorate General of Higher Education
  - Planning and Budgeting Section
  - Information and Reporting Section
  - Legal and Personnel Section
  - General Section
- Directorate of Learning and Student Affairs
  - Subdirectorate of Programs and Evaluation
  - Subdirectorate of Learning
  - Subdirectorate of Alignment
  - Subdirectorate of Student Affairs
  - Subdirectorate of Administration
- Directorate of Research and Community Service
  - Subdirectorate of Research
  - Subdirectorate of Creativity and Community Service
  - Subdirectorate of Intellectual Property Rights and Publication
  - Subdirectorate of Program and Evaluation
  - Subdirectorate of Administration
- Directorate of Lecturers and Educational Staff
  - Subdirectorate of Program and Evaluation
  - Subdirectorate of Planning and Procurement
  - Subdirectorate of Career
  - Subdirectorate of Qualification
  - Subdirectorate of Administration
- Directorate of Institution and Cooperation
  - Subdirectorate of Institutional Development
  - Subdirectorate of Inter-Institutional Cooperation
  - Subdirectorate of Program and Evaluation
  - Subdirectorate of Institutional Empowerment
  - Subdirectorate of Administration

The directorate general continued to exist until 2014, when it was merged with the Ministry of Research and Technology to form the Ministry of Research, Technology, and Higher Education by President Joko Widodo. The directorate general continued to exist under the ministry until its reorganization in early 2015. The Presidential Decree No. 13 of 2015, dated 23 January 2015, formally separated the directorate general into three different directorate general under the ministry: the directorate general of learning and student affairs; science, technology, and higher education institution; science, technology, and higher education resources.

=== Third iteration (2019-now) ===
During Joko Widodo's second term, the three directorate generals that formed the Directorate General of Higher Education were placed under the administration of the Ministry of Education and Culture on 24 October 2019. The three directorate general were re-merged to form the Directorate General of Higher Education on 18 December 2019. Nizam, the dean of Gadjah Mada University's engineering faculty, was named as the acting director general on 20 January and assumed the position permanently on 21 July. The directorate general responsibilities include the management and supervision of higher education institution, as well as issuing permits for private higher education institutions. At the time of its formation, the directorate general consisted of a secretariat and three directorate: learning and student affairs; institutional affairs; resources.

The directorate general underwent a name change on 16 July 2021, when the Ministry of Research and Technology was merged with the Ministry of Education and Culture to form the Ministry of Education, Culture, Research, and Higher Education. The Directorate General of Higher Education was renamed into the Directorate General of Higher Education, Research, and Technology. According to the president, the renamed directorate general would be responsible for scientific research, while the development of research, innovation and applied technology would be the responsibility of the National Research and Innovation Agency, which is now under an independent agency reporting directly to the president. The renaming resulted in the addition of the directorate of research, technology, and community service into the directorate general.

The directorate general was renamed again to the Directorate General of Higher Education with the establishment of the Ministry of Research, Technology, and Higher Education. The directorate of research, technology, and community service was re-established as two separate directorate general, and the directorate general is also responsible for vocational higher education, which was previously under the jurisdiction of the now-dissolved Directorate General of Vocational Affairs.

== Long-term plans ==
In 1975 the first initiative to develop a national higher education policy was launched by developing the first higher education long term strategy (HELTS) for the period of 1975-1985. The national system, comprising public and private sectors, emphasized on the aspect of relevance by recognizing the need to establish strong linkages with the regional and national development. In addition to the introduction of a dual system, consisting of academic and professional streams, 3 program levels in higher education were introduced, i.e. Diploma, Sarjana, and Graduate programs. The organizational and management aspects were given serious attention through the introduction of credit system, student academic evaluation, student load, and staff promotion system.

In 1986-1995, the development was focused to consolidate previous achievement and improvement of quality. The economic downturn caused by the sudden drop of oil price had prevented the student enrollment for further expansion. Nevertheless, the enrollment in private sector was steadily expanded at the rate of 9% per annum. An early attempt to introduce reform in higher education by issuing a new Government Regulation (PP) 30/1990 did not achieve the expected outcome due to inadequate public and political support.

The 3rd HELTS 1996-2005 was developed based on the assumption that the economy would grow steadily at the rate of 6-8% per annum as it was in the last 10 years. In order to meet the future needs and demands, three major issues are identified, namely the need of a more dynamic management mode in higher education to cope with the dynamic changes, the need to take quality and relevance as the basic reference for higher education development, and the need for enhancing social mobility and equity through higher education development. The strategy comprises the following three core programs, implementation of the new paradigm in higher education management; improvement of relevance and quality; and geographical and social equity. Based on these three core programs, the main program categories and main programs are then developed.

All of a sudden, in 1997 East Asian countries, including Indonesia, experienced the worst ever economic crisis, followed by the fall of its political and social system. Between 1998 and 1999, the economy contracted by 13% and 1% respectively. The economic growth only crawled at 4% in 2002, and the previous growth of 7% enjoyed in the 1990s was not expected to revive in the next 3 to 5 years. The fall of the authoritarian government creates euphoria in almost every sector that the stability previously taken for granted has currently become a luxury. The centralistic approach taken by the 3rd HELTS immediately becomes obsolete and cannot cope with these new types of challenges. Meanwhile, a funding mechanism based on the new paradigm concept (the first core program) has been implemented since 1995 and the proportion of DIP allocated under this scheme increased to 25% in 2002. All competitive funding schemes under this concept take improvement of quality and relevance (the second core program) as their primary objective. The third core program, expansion of enrolment to achieve geographical and social equity, however, does not meet the expectation due to the financial constraint.

== Organization ==
The current organization of the directorate general is established by the Decree of the Minister of Higher Education, Science, and Technology, dated 31 December 2024. The directorate general consists of a secretariat and three directorates.

- Secretariat of the Directorate General of Higher Education:
  - Program and Reporting Section
  - Financial and General Section
- Directorate of Learning and Student Affairs
  - Subdirectorate of Quality Control
  - Administration Subsection
- Directorate of Institutional Affairs
  - Subdirectorate of Development and Management of Higher Education Institution
  - Administration Subsection
- Directorate of Resources
  - Subdirectorate of Academic and Educational Staff Management
  - Subdirectorate of Facilities and Infrastructure
  - Administration Subsection

== List of director generals ==
No	Name	University	Took office	Left office	Previous office
Director General of Higher Education (1966–1968)
1	Mashuri Saleh	Gadjah Mada University	1966	1968	Deputy Minister for Higher Education
Merged into the Directorate General of Education, Bachtiar Rifai and Makaminan Makagiansar as Director General of Education (1968 – 1974)
Director General of Higher Education (1974–2015)
2	Makaminan Makagiansar	IPB University	1974	26 July 1976	Director General of Education
3	Doddy Tisna Amidjaja	Bandung Institute of Technology	26 July 1976	17 May 1984	Rector of the Bandung Institute of Technology
4	Sukadji Ranuwihardjo	Gadjah Mada University	17 May 1984	11 May 1993	Rector of the Gadjah Mada University
5	Bambang Soehendro	Gadjah Mada University	11 May 1993	20 April 1999	Director of Academic Facilities Development
6	Satryo Brodjonegoro	Bandung Institute of Technology	20 April 1999	30 November 2007	Director of Academic Facilities Development
7	Fasli Jalal	Andalas University	30 November 2007	15 June 2010	Director General of Educator and Academic Personnel Development
8	Djoko Santoso	Bandung Institute of Technology	15 June 2010	27 October 2014	Rector of the Bandung Institute of Technology
—	Ainun Na'im	Gadjah Mada University	2014	2015	Secretary General of the Ministry of Education and Culture
Merged into the Ministry of Research, Technology, and Higher Education, Mohamad Nasir as minister (2015 – 2019)
Director General of Higher Education (2019–2021)
—	Nizam	Gadjah Mada University	20 January 2020	21 July 2020	Dean of Engineering Faculty, Gadjah Mada University
9	Nizam	Gadjah Mada University	21 July 2020	1 August 2021	Dean of Engineering Faculty, Gadjah Mada University
Director General of Higher Education, Research, and Technology (2021–2024)
—	Nizam	Gadjah Mada University	1 August 2021	15 March 2024	Director General of Higher Education
10	Abdul Haris	University of Indonesia	15 March 2024	8 November 2024	Deputy Rector of the University of Indonesia
Director General of Higher Education (2024–now)
10	Abdul Haris	University of Indonesia	8 November 2024	12 December 2024	Director General of Higher Education, Research, and Technology
—	Khairul Munadi	Syiah Kuala University	12 December 2024	6 January 2025	Director of Institutional Affairs
11	Khairul Munadi	Syiah Kuala University	6 January 2025	present	Director of Institutional Affairs

== List of directors ==
=== Current directorates ===
A list of former and current directors who have served in existing directorates of the Directorate General of Higher Education.

==== Secretary of the Directorate General (1974 – now) ====
- Suwarno (1974 – 1983)
- Oetomo Djajanegara (1983 – 1991)
- Frits Bernhard Mewengkang (1991 – 1994)
- Sudjarwadi (1994 – 1999)
- Suparna (1999 – 2002)
- Tommy Ilyas (2002 – 2006)
- Suryo Hapsoro Tri Utomo (2006 – 2009)
- Harris Iskandar (2009 – 2012)
- Patdono Suwignjo (2012 – 2015)
- Paristiyanti Nurwardani (2020 – 2022)
- Tjitjik Sri Tjahjandarie (2022 – 2024, acting)
- Samsuri (2025, acting)
- Aisyah Endah Palupi (2025)
- Setiawan (2025 – now)

==== Director of Learning and Student Affairs ====
- Aris Junaidi (2020 – 2023)
- Sri Suning Kusumawardani (2023 – 2025)
- Berry Juliandi (2025, acting)
- Beny Bandanadjaja (2025 – now)

==== Director of Institutional Affairs ====
- Ridwan (2020 – 2022)
- Lukman (2022 – 2024)
- Bhimo Widyo Andoko (2024, acting)
- Khairul Munadi (2024 – 2025)
- Mukhamad Najib (2025 – now)

==== Director of Resources ====
- Mohammad Sofwan Effendi (2020 – 2024)
- Lukman (2024 – 2025)
- Sri Suning Kusumawardani (2025 – now, acting until 2025)

=== Former directorates ===
A list of former directors who have served in now-dissolved directorates of the Directorate General of Higher Education.

==== Director of Higher Education (under the Directorate General of Education) ====
- Koesnadi Hardjasoemantri (1967 – 1973)

==== Director of Research and Community Service Development (1974 – 2015) ====
- Achjani Atmakusuma (1974 – 1982)
- Yuhara Sukra (1982 – 1987)
- Oetit Koswara (1987 – 1989)
- Jajah Koswara (1989 – 2002)
- Dodi Nandika (2002 – 2004)
- Moch. Munir (2004 – 2009)
- Suryo Hapsoro Tri Utomo (2009 – 2012)
- Agus Subekti (2012 – 2015)

==== Director of Private Colleges (1974 – 2000) ====
- Soekisno Hadikoemoro (1974 – 1987)
- Yuhara Sukra (1987 – 1993)
- Sambas Wirakusumah (1993 – 1996)
- Joetata Hadihardaja (1996 – 2000)

==== Director of Academic Facilities Development (1975 – 2000) ====
- Samaun Samadikun (1975 – 1978)
- Sidharta Pramoetadi (1978 – 1988)
- Bambang Suhendro (1989 – 1993)
- Harsono Taroepratjeka (1993 – 1997)
- Satryo Brodjonegoro (1997 – 1999)
- Suprodjo Pusposutardjo (1999 – 2000)

==== Director of Student Affairs (1974 – 2000) ====
- Soedjoko (1974 – 1979)
- Soelaeman Soekardi (1979 – 1984)
- Djoko Hartanto (1984 – 1986)
- Enoch Markum (1986 – 1996)
- Sudharmadi (1996 – 2000)

==== Director of Academic Facilities Development and Student Affairs (2000 – 2015) ====
- Suprodjo Pusposutardjo (2000 – ?)
- Tresna Dermawan Kunaefi (2006 – 2010)
- Illah Sailah (2010 – 2015)

==== Director of Education Development of Educational Staff and Personnel (2000 – 2015) ====
- Sudharmadi (2000 – 2003)
- Fuad Abdul Hamied (2003 – 2005)
- Muchlas Samani (2007 – 2010)
- Supriadi Rustad (2010 – 2015)

==== Director of Institutional and Societal Involvement Development (2000 – 2015) ====
- Sukamto (2000 – ?)
- Supeno Djanali (? – 2008)
- Hendarman (2008 – 2010)
- Achmad Jazidie (2010 – 2013)
- Hermawan Kresno Dipojono (2013 – 2015)

==== Director of Research, Technology, and Community Service (2022 – 2024) ====
- Teuku Faisal Fathani (2021 – 2022, acting)
- M. Faiz Syuaib (2022 – 2024)
