= Frits Bernhard Mewengkang =

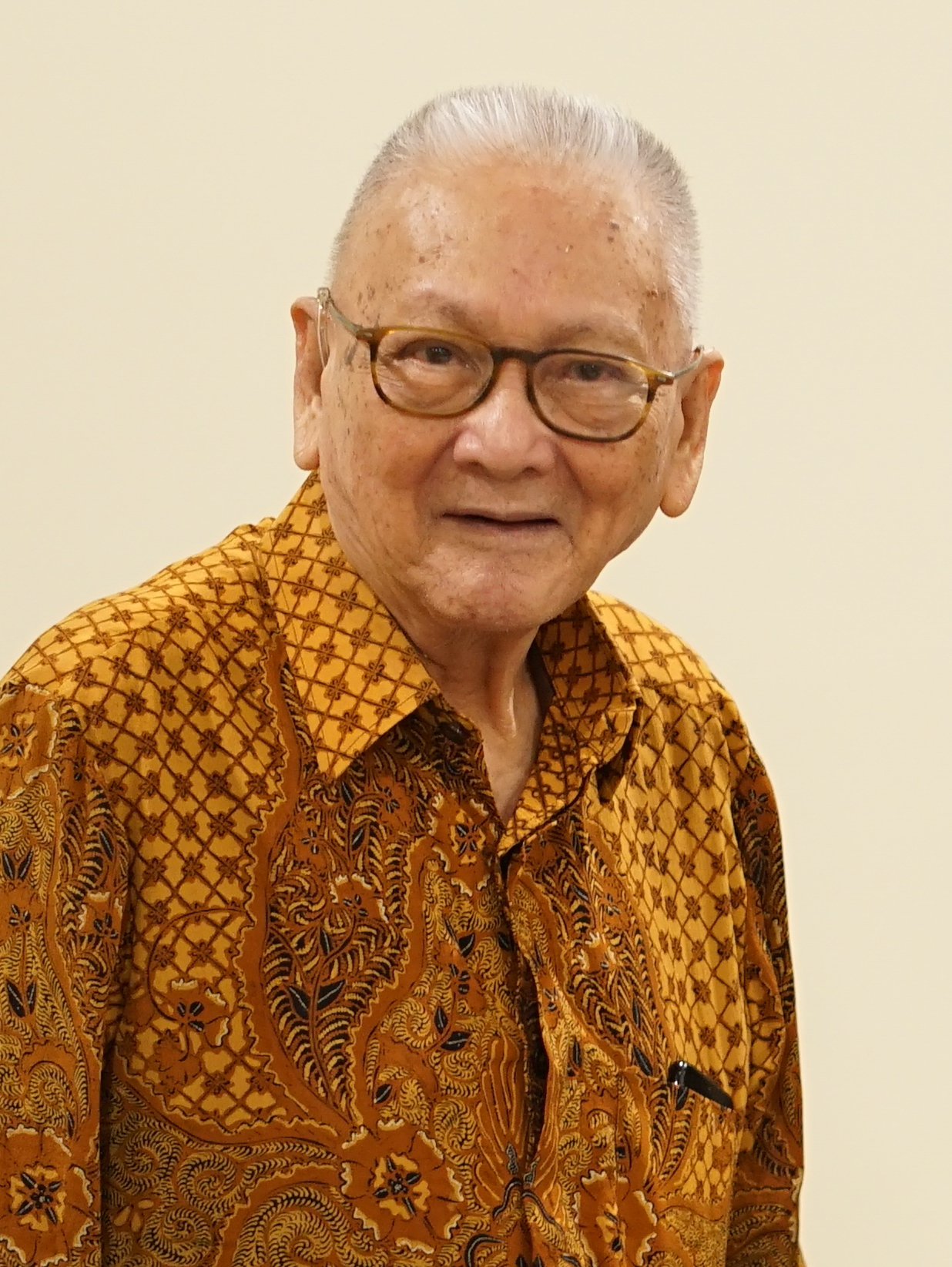
- Mewengkang in 2024

Secretary of the Directorate General of Higher Education
- In office 1 July 1992 – 1994
- Preceded by: Oetomo Djajanegara
- Succeeded by: Sudjarwadi

Dean of the University of Indonesia Faculty of Engineering
- In office 1977–1982
- Preceded by: Suwondo Bismo Sutedjo
- Succeeded by: Indradjid Soebardjo

Personal details
- Born: August 28, 1935 (age 91) Balikpapan, Dutch East Indies
- Education: Bandung Institute of Technology (Ir.)

Frits Bernhard Mewengkang (born 28 August 1935) is an Indonesian academic and bureaucrat. He was the dean of the University of Indonesia's engineering faculty from 1977 until 1982 and the secretary of the Directorate General of Higher Education from 1990 to 1993.

== Early life and education ==
Born in Balikpapan on 28 August 1935, Mewengkang studied civil engineering at the University of Indonesia in Bandung, which in 1959 separated from the University of Indonesia to form the Bandung Institute of Technology. As a student, Mewengkang became a member of the Indonesian Christian Student Movement and represented the university at the Student Sports Week in Medan and Surabaya. He graduated as an engineer from the institute in 1964. As a lecturer, Mewengkang attended a number of courses abroad, such as International Hydraulic Course held by the Delft Engineering Institute, International Defence Management Course in the United States, a seminar on steel in Tokyo, and a symposium on engineering held by the UNESCO in Paris.

== Career ==
After Mewengkang graduated in 1964, University of Indonesia decided to establish its own engineering faculty in Jakarta. Mewengkang joined the faculty in 1966 and became its second permanent lecturer. He became the chair of the civil engineering department in 1968. After a few years, he was promoted to become the faculty's deputy dean for academic affairs and head of the education bureau under dean Roosseno Soerjohadikoesoemo. Roosseno was replaced by Suwondo Bismo Sutedjo in 1974 and Mewengkang became his deputy for administration and financial affairs.

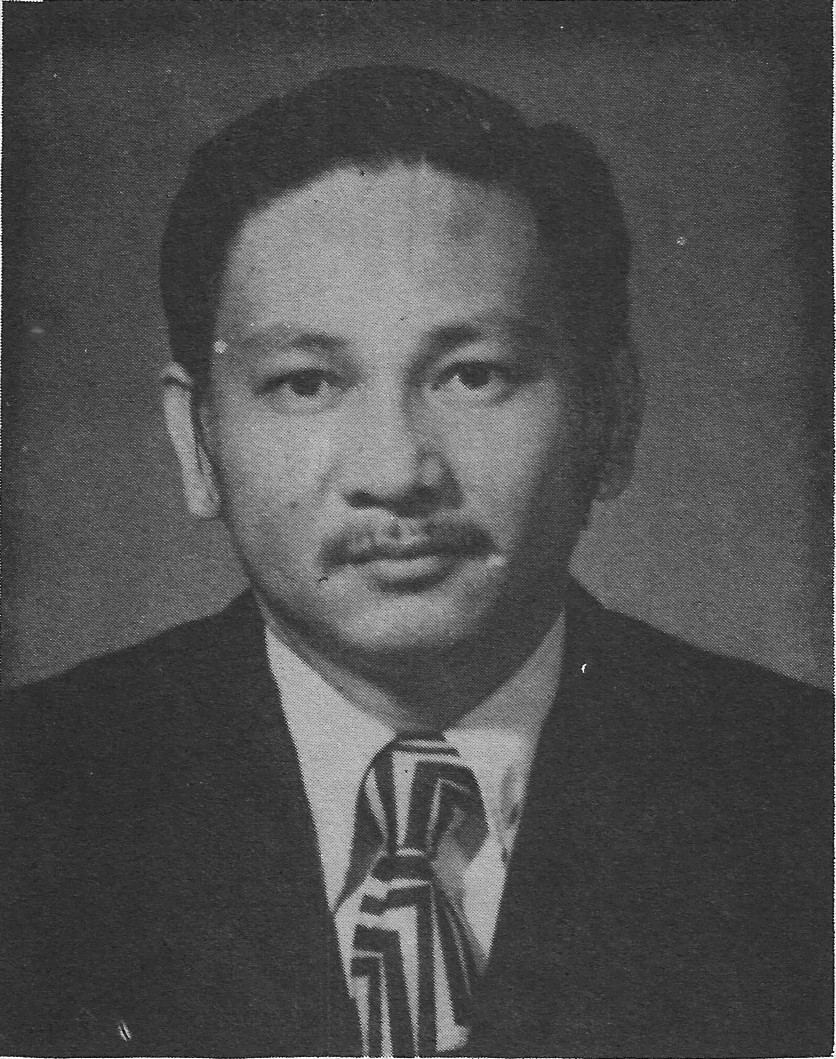
Mewengkang as dean, 1982

Mewengkang became the dean of the faculty of engineering from 1977 until 1982. During his tenure, he oversaw the development of a long-term human resource development program, aimed at addressing the shortage of permanent faculty members. He also sent lecturers to pursue study abroad, especially to the United States, and brought in foreign lecturers to enhance the faculty's expertise. His second term as dean, which began in 1981, was cut short in 1982 as he was appointed as the inaugural director of the newly established University of Indonesia Polytechnic until 1983.

After serving in a number of University of Indonesia posts, Mewengkang was appointed as the education and cultural attaché at the Indonesian embassy in the Netherlands. He returned to Indonesia following his appointment as the secretary of the Directorate General of Higher Education on 1 July 1992, replacing Oetomo Djajanegara from the Bogor Institute of Agriculture. He ended his tenure as directorate general secretary in 1994 and was replaced by Sudjarwadi.

== Personal life ==
Mewengkang is a Protestant Christian. He is an active member of a number of social organizations, such as the Council of the Rawamangun Nazareth Church and the deputy chairman of the Maesa Sports Organization. He is married to Annie Roring and has a son and a daughter.

== Awards ==
- Military Instructor Service Medals (Indonesian: Satyalancana Dwidya Sistha)
