= Larasati =

Larasati is a name. Notable people with the name include:

== Given name ==
- Larasati Gading (born 1971), Indonesian equestrian competitor

== Surname ==
- Dwinita Larasati (born 1972), Indonesian industrial designer and cartoonist
- Kirana Larasati (born 1987), Indonesian actress
