= Achjani Atmakusuma =

Indonesian academic and diplomat

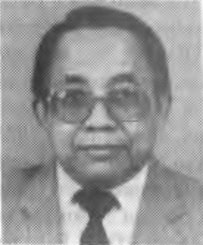

Rector of the Jayabaya University
- In office 10 September 1988 – 1996
- Preceded by: Moeslim Taher
- Succeeded by: Syamsu Anwar

Permanent Delegate of Indonesia to UNESCO
- In office 1981–1986
- President: Suharto
- Preceded by: Partomo Alibazah
- Succeeded by: Marsetio Donoseputro

Director of Research and Community Service Development
- In office 17 April 1975 – August 1981
- Preceded by: office established
- Succeeded by: Yuhara Sukra

Personal details
- Born: 13 October 1928 Pandeglang, West Java, Dutch East Indies
- Died: 6 October 1997 (aged 68) Tegallega, Bogor, West Java, Indonesia
- Spouse: Lily Karlinah (m. 1958)
- Children: 4
- Education: University of Indonesia (drh.); University of Michigan (M.Sc.); Bogor Agricultural Institute (Dr., Prof.)

Academic background
- Thesis: Cyperus rotundus Linn: a pharmacological investigation (1965)
- Doctoral advisor: Augustinus Johannes Darman

Academic work
- Discipline: Pharmacology
- Sub-discipline: Pharmacotherapy

Tubagus Achjani Atmakusuma (13 October 1928 – 6 September 1997) was an Indonesian academic and diplomat. He served as the Director of Research and Community Service Development in the Directorate General of Higher Education from 1975 to 1981, Permanent Delegate of Indonesia to the United Nations Educational, Scientific and Cultural Organization from 1981 to 1986, and as the Rector of the Jayabaya University from 1988 to 1996.

== Early life and education ==
Born on 13 November 1928 in Pandeglang, Achjani studied veterinary medicine at the University of Indonesia (UI) in October 1952, shortly after completing high school. He completed his studies with distinction and graduated from the university on 1 March 1957 with a bachelor's degree on 1 March 1957. He officially became a certified veterinarian on 9 May 1958. From 1959 to 1960, Achjani pursued his master's studies on pharmacology at the University of Michigan and graduated with a Certificate of Achievement in the Field of Pharmacology in September 1960. He received his doctorate from the Bogor Agricultural Institute on 16 January 1965, with his thesis titled Cyperus rotundus Linn: a pharmacological investigation. His doctoral advisor was the inaugural rector of IPB, Augustinus Johannes Darman.

== Career ==
Achjani began teaching at UI's veterinary faculty in 1957. Several years later, the veterinary and agriculture faculty of UI was merged to form the Bogor Agricultural Institute (IPB). He became IPB's Deputy Rector for Academic Affairs and the secretary of the institute's senate from 1965 to 1966, and the chair of the pharmacotherapy section in the physiology pharmacology department in 1966. From 1968 to 1969, Achjani was a visiting scientist at the Utrecht State University. Upon his return, from 1971 to 1972 Achjani was entrusted as the head of the physiology pharmacology department in IPB's veterinary medicine faculty. He was promoted as the faculty's dean in 1972 and served in the position until 1975. In September 1973, Achjani was appointed as a full professor in pharmacology.

Outside IPB, Achjani was involved in developing a standard curriculum for agricultural sciences as the Secretary of the Consortium for Agricultural Sciences. In 1974, Achjani was invited by Director General of Education Makaminan Makagiansar, along with Samaun Samadikun and Soekisno Hadikoemoro, to discuss the formation of Directorate General of Higher Education and its organization. Makaminan became the inaugural director general of the agency, and Achjani became the Director of Research and Community Service Development. He served in the position from 17 April 1975 until August 1981. Achjani was appointed as Indonesia's permanent delegate to the UNESCO in 1981 and served until 10 January 1986.

Two years later, on 10 September 1988 Achjani was appointed to lead the Jayabaya University as an acting rector, replacing Moeslim Taher who became the university's foundation chairman. His appointment was made permanent in 1989, and he served as rector until 1996. He then became a member of the Council of Higher Education, an advisory body on higher education matters responsible to the Minister of Education and Culture.

== Personal life ==
Achjani is a Muslim. He is married to Lily Karlinah on 7 December 1958. The couple has four children: Ratu Yuliani (born 7 July 1961), Ratu Yulianti (born 12 July 1963), Tubagus Firman Daradjat (born 9 September 1966), and Ratu Meity Adiasti (born 30 April 1971).

Achjani died on 6 September 1997 in Tegallega, Bogor.
