= Moeslim Taher =

Moeslim Taher,
- مسلم طاهر

Member of the Supreme Advisory Council of the Republic of Indonesia
- In office 1983–1988
- President: Soeharto
- Vice President: Umar Wirahadikusumah
- Chairman: Maraden Panggabean

Rector of Jayabaya University
- In office 1962–1988
- Preceded by: A. A. Hakim
- Succeeded by: Achjani Atmakusuma

Personal details
- Born: Muslim; September 10, 1934 Sigli, Pidie Regency, Aceh
- Died: November 23, 1999 (aged 65) Jakarta
- Spouse: Yuyun Hindun (m. 1963–1999)
- Children: 16
- Parents: Haji Sidi Muhammad Taher (father); Nurcahya (mother)
- Education: Jayabaya University (law degree, 1965); Padjadjaran University (bachelor's degree, 1968); Padjadjaran University (doctor of science, 1979)
- Occupation: Academician; businessperson; lecturer
- Known for: Founder of Jayabaya University

Moeslim Taher, S.H. (also written Muslim Taher, Arabic: مسلم طاهر, romanized: Muslim Ṭāhir, Arabic pronunciation: [muslim tˤa:hir]; September 10, 1934 – November 23, 1999) was an Indonesian educator who founded Jayabaya University on October 5, 1958. Taher was later appointed become 2nd rector of Jayabaya University for the period 1962–1988 replacing Prof. Mr. S. A. Hakim as first rector. In addition, Taher was appointed by Soeharto as the Supreme Advisory Council of the Republic of Indonesia from 1983 to 1988.

== Biography ==
=== Early life ===
Sidi Moeslim bin Muhammad Taher was born in Sigli, Pidie Regency, Aceh as the fourth of seven children from a family of Arab-Minangkabau origin. His last name Taher (Arabic: طاهر, romanized: Ṭāhir; pronounced [tˤɑːˈher]) is one of the Ba 'Alawi sada clans of Hadhrami Arab in Indonesia. His father was named Haji Sidi Muhammad Taher who was a retired head of the pawnshop, while his mother was a Minangkabau woman named Nurcahya. In the Minangkabau custom, the honoric prefix Sidi in front of its name is an abbreviation of the Arabic word Sayyidi (Arabic: سيدي, romanized: Sayyīdī; "milord"). This title came from Pariaman, West Sumatra and was given to the son of an ulama who was still a descendant of the Islamic prophet Muhammad who spread Islam in Pariaman and its surroundings.

=== Education ===
Moeslim Taher began his education at the elementary school level in Sigli and graduated in 1947. He then continued his junior and senior high school education in Padang and graduated in 1957. He obtained a law degree from the university he led, Jayabaya University in 1965. Three years later, he earned a bachelor's degree from the Faculty of Social and Politics, Padjadjaran University (Unpad). In Unpad he also became an extraordinary lecturer in 1978 and a year later earned a doctorate with cum laude.

=== Personal life ===
During his life, Moeslim Taher was married five times. His first marriage was with a woman of Hadhrami Arab descent named Nurtini binti Sjahboedin in 1962. From his marriage to Nurtini, Taher obtained a child named Agustian Putrajaya (born on August 30, 1963). In 1963, Taher remarried Yuyun Hindun. From his second marriage, he had seven children, including Mustar, Mulia, Rachmat, Yulia, Kurnia, Sartika, and Citasari.

In 1965, Taher remarried a Batak girl named Rosemary Siagian but on December 22, 1965, they decided to divorce. From his marriage to Rosemary, Taher had a daughter named Dessy Musnilla. His fourth marriage was with Saleha in 1975. From his fourth marriage, Taher obtained six children, including Amri, Nurfitri, Firman, Moehamad Ichsan, Firdaus, and Rasyid. Meanwhile, Taher's last marriage was with Fatimah in 1984 and divorced that same year. From his marriage to Fatimah, he had a daughter named Sabrina. Of his five wives, only three accompanied Taher until the end of his life, they were Nurtini binti Sjahboedin, Yuyun Hindun, and Saleha.

== Career ==
When he was in junior high school, from 1950–1952 he taught elementary school in Padang. Subsequently, in 1954–1957 he had become a junior and senior high school teacher in Jakarta. A few years later he became director of a private high school and in 1959 he instead founded Jayabaya University, Jakarta. When first founded the university, he was 24 years old. This initiative seems to be a further development of his devotion to education, with a career that began when he became an elementary school caretaker, junior high school leader, and later high school leader. The experience in devotion in the field of education that later encouraged him to establish Jayabaya University. Other than that, Taher felt responsible for giving answers to the challenges faced by the Indonesian nation in the form of problems of lagging and backwardness in various fields. Understandably, when Jayabaya University was founded, Indonesia was only 13 years old and the number of universities was still few.

At the beginning of its establishment, Jayabaya University began by managing two faculties, namely the Faculty of Law and the Faculty of Economics with 11 students. Educational and administrative activities are carried out by borrowing a place at Private Schools at Jalan Salemba Raya 12, Central Jakarta. Classrooms in the morning and afternoon are used by elementary, junior high school, and senior high school students, therefore new lectures take place in the afternoon and evening, from 5 pm to 9 pm. Taher led Jayabaya University as rector in 1961 to replace Prof. Mr. S. A. Hakimm who led from 1959 to 1961, during that period, Taher held the position of vice-rector and secretary. In 1965, he obtained a law degree from the university he led. Three years later, he obtained a bachelor's degree from the Faculty of Social and Political Science, Padjadjaran University. In Unpad he also became an extraordinary lecturer since 1978 and a year later earned a doctorate with cum laude.

== Other activities ==
As a rector of a private university, in 1980, Taher was appointed become general chairman of the Chancellor's Council of Private Universities and Institutes throughout Indonesia. A few years later he was appointed president of the International Association of Universities for the Southeast Asia region. In addition, in the political realm Taher was appointed by Suharto as the Supreme Advisory Council of the Republic of Indonesia from 1983 to 1988.

== Publications ==
Taher has written some books, among others are:

- Sistem Pemerintahan Pancasila (Pancasila Government System), published by Nusa Bangsa in 1978
- Berdialog dengan Situasi untuk Membangun Hari Esok: Kumpulan Pidato Dies Natalis ke XIX s/d XXV Rektor Universitas Jayabaya (1977–1983) (Dialogue with the Situation to Build Tomorrow: A Collection of Speeches from the 19th to 27th Anniversary of the Rector of Jayabaya University (1977–1983)), published by Jayabaya Foundation in 1983
- Civitas Akademica Sumber Konsepsi Dinamika: untuk Melarutkan Nilai-nilai Budaya Kepada Generasi Penerus (Civitas Academica Source Conception of Dynamics: to Dissolve Cultural Values to the Next Generation), published by Jayabaya Foundation in 1983
- Iman, Ilmu & Amal Berlandaskan Kematangan Mental Spiritual: Kumpulan Karya Tulis, Ceramah, dan Khotbah Terpilih (Faith, Science & Charity Based on Spiritual Mental Maturity: A Collection of Written Work, Lectures, and Selected Sermons), published by Jayabaya Foundation in 1984
- Menemukan Suatu Sistem dengan Proses Perubahan Terpola (Finding a System with a Patterned Change Process), published by Jayabaya Foundation in 1984
- Menuju Perilaku Berlandaskan Nilai-nilai dan Moral Pancasila (Towards Behavior Based on Values and Morals of Pancasila), published by Jayabaya Foundation in 1984

== Appreciation ==
In June 2013, a book about the struggle of Moeslim Taher and his wife Yuyun Moeslim Taher (Yuyun Hindun) in developing the world of education by establishing Jayabaya University amid various limitations was launched. The book, entitled Hidup Berakal, Mati Beriman: Perjuangan Pengantin Pendidikan Prof. Dr. H.M. Moeslim Taher, S.H., Prof. Dr. Hj. Yuyun Moeslim Taher, S.H., Membesarkan Universitas Jayabaya (Life Have Sense, Die Have Faith: the Struggle of the Education Bride Prof. Dr. H.M. Moeslim Taher, S.H., Prof. Dr. Hj. Yuyun Moeslim Taher, S.H., Raising Jayabaya University) was written by their own son, namely Kurnia P. Moeslim Taher.
