= Satryo Brodjonegoro =

Indonesian politician (born 1956)

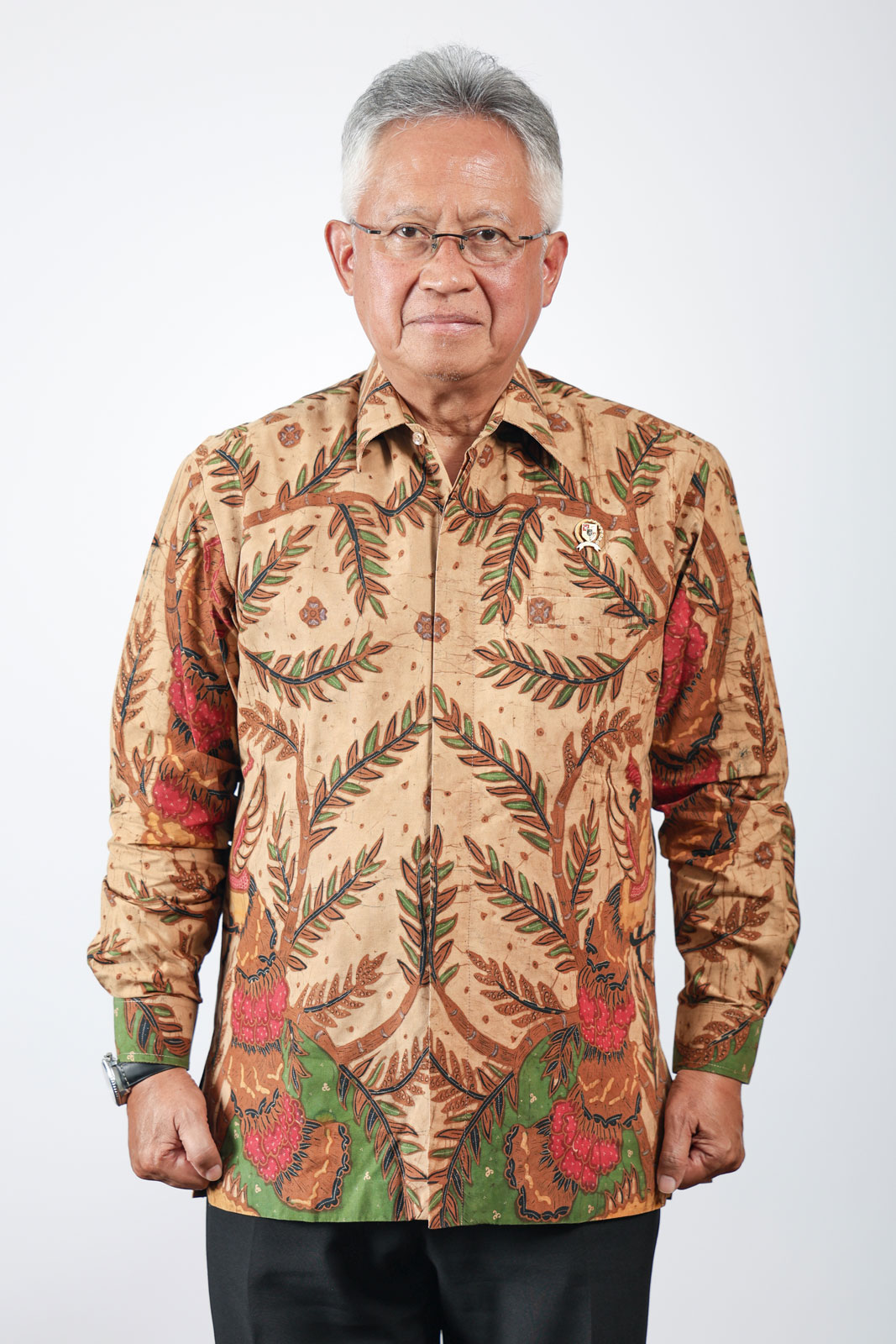
- Official portrait, 2024

6th Minister of Higher Education, Science, and Technology
- In office 21 October 2024 – 19 February 2025
- President: Prabowo Subianto
- Preceded by: Mohamad Nasir (Minister of Research, Technology, and Higher Education)
- Succeeded by: Brian Yuliarto

Director General of Higher Education
- In office 20 April 1999 – 30 November 2007
- Preceded by: Bambang Soehendro
- Succeeded by: Fasli Jalal

Personal details
- Born: 5 January 1956 (age 70) Delft, Netherlands
- Spouse: Silvia Ratnawati
- Children: 2, including Diantha Soemantri
- Parents: Soemantri Brodjonegoro (father); Nani Soeminarsari (mother)
- Relatives: Bambang Brodjonegoro (brother)
- Education: Bandung Institute of Technology (S.T., Prof.); University of California, Berkeley (M.S., Dr.)

Academic background
- Thesis: The Mechanism of Two and Three Body Abrasive Wear in Ductile Metals (1985)
- Doctoral advisor: Iain Finnie

Academic work
- Discipline: Engineering
- Sub-discipline: Mechanical engineering

Satryo Soemantri Brodjonegoro (born 5 January 1956) is an Indonesian academic and politician. He served as Minister of Higher Education, Science, and Technology from 21 October 2024 to 19 February 2025. He also served as director general of higher education from 20 April 1999 to 30 November 2007.

== Early life and education ==
Satryo was born on 5 January 1956 at the Bethel Hospital in Delft, Netherlands. He is the eldest son of Soemantri Brodjonegoro, an academician who served as the Rector of University of Indonesia (UI) and minister in President Suharto's cabinet, and Nani Soeminarsari, a physician specializing in dermatology and venereal disease. Satryo's grandfather, Soetedjo Brodjonegoro, was an educator and politician from Parindra.

At the time of his birth, Soemantri Brodjonegoro was pursuing his doctorate at the Delft Institute of Technology. According to his biographer, Soemantri fainted while delivering Nani, who was in labor, to the hospital. Soemantri fainted due to exhaustion or the sight of blood, as there were many injured people and a lot of blood around the hospital at that time. A day after Satryo's birth, Soemantri returned to Eindhoven to complete his thesis, and Nani's friends took turn watching him and Nani in the hospital.

As a child, Satryo was often taught by Soemantri, who would give him difficult exercises for him to work on. Due to his intelligence, he was given a chance by his school to take his final exam in elementary school a year earlier. His father, however, rejected the offer, and told Satryo to "follow the process". Despite his father's high-ranking position, Satryo never received any gifts from his parents after finishing school—contrary to the custom at that time—and on his birthday. According to Satryo, his only birthday gift from Soemantri was an outdated but unused agenda. Soemantri died while Satryo was still in high school.

Upon finishing high school, Satryo studied mechanical engineering at the Bandung Institute of Technology (ITB) and graduated with a bachelor's degree in 1980. He continued his studies at the University of California, Berkeley, where he received his master of science degree in 1981 and his doctorate on 17 May 1985. His doctoral advisor was Iain Finnie, with his thesis titled The Mechanism of Two and Three Body Abrasive Wear in Ductile Metals. In 1995, he attended a regular course held by the National Resilience Institute for several months.

== Academic career ==
Satryo followed his father's academic footsteps and began his career as a lecturer in the mechanical engineering department of ITB in 1980. In 1988, Satryo received the "exemplary lecturer" award from ITB's rector. By 1992, Satryo was appointed as the chair of the mechanical engineering department in ITB. During this period, he implemented a self-evaluation system, which would later be adopted nationally during his tenure as director general. By 1995, he had already become the deputy dean for academic affairs in ITB's faculty of industrial technology.

=== Later academic career ===
Satryo returned to his academic career as a lecturer in ITB after serving as director general for more than eight years. He also became a visiting lecturer at the Toyohashi University of Technology. Satryo was also active in various academic organizations, such as the Indonesian Academy of Sciences and the Union of Professors.

== Director General of Higher Education ==
Satryo as director general.

After two years of service in ITB, in 1997 Satryo was appointed as the Director of Academic Facilities Development in the Directorate General of Higher Education. In his capacity, Satryo was involved in implementing a distance education scheme for Indonesia, which was funded by the World Bank. Satryo, along with historian Anhar Gonggong and secretary general of the department of education Sofian Effendi, assisted minister of education Juwono Sudarsono in formulating a new, post-Suharto curriculum for students in Indonesia.

Two years later, in 1999, the position of the Director General of Higher Education was vacant following the departure of Bambang Soehendro, the previous director general, as Indonesia's ambassador to UNESCO. Although Jimly Asshiddiqie, the expert staff to education minister Wardiman Djojonegoro, was named as a strong candidate, the incumbent minister at that time, Juwono Sudarsono, decided to nominate Satryo for the position. His nomination was approved by President B. J. Habibie and he was installed as director general on 20 April 1999. At the time of his appointment, he was the youngest director general in the department of education and culture. He served for two four-year terms until 30 November 2007, when he was replaced by Fasli Jalal.

In line with the central government's policy of regional autonomy, Satryo's directorate general supported the existence of more higher education institution in various regions in Indonesia but urged the central government to continue implementing basic skill standards in universities to maintain competitiveness.

=== Student affairs ===
On 17 June 1999, Satryo issued a ban for all universities to stop all hazing and initiation programs for freshmen, following the death of Suryowati Hagus, a freshman at the National Institute of Science and Technology in Jakarta. Satryo also oversaw the transformation of the status student regiment into a regular student organization under the supervision of the university. Previously, the student regiment was under the supervision of the local military regional command, which could deploy the regiment without approval from the university's rector.

=== Autonomous universities and budget cuts ===
Early in his tenure, Satryo announced that the government would transform the status of state universities in Indonesia into a self-funded, autonomous, higher education institute. The transformation was a direct implementation of the government decree No. 61 of 1999, dated 24 June 1999. The transformation was intended to establish universities as an independent institution with moral authority. The regulation allowed the universities to set their priorities, conduct research, and operate without political interference. The universities will have the flexibility to engage in activities that support their functions. These universities would continue to receive government subsidies, which can be used to assist financially disadvantaged students. The four largest and most prestigious universities of Indonesia—UI, ITB, Gadjah Mada University (UGM), and the Bogor Agricultural Institute (IPB)—were named as pilot projects for this program. According to Satryo, the autonomous higher education program could allow universities in streamlining its large and inefficient bureaucracy by giving it more autonomy, thus saving its money. In order to assist these universities in transitioning to an autonomous body, Satryo's directorate general promised a total of up to 10 million dollars for the universities, which were to be obtained from World Bank loan. However, these plans were promptly cancelled due to the desire to reduce foreign loans by the Megawati administration.

The self-funded state university program was followed by a cut on subsidies from government to state universities, which caused concerns among state university administrators in Indonesia. Satryo claimed that the subsidy cut was due to a reduction in the government's budget. The subsidy cut, along with the autonomous university program, was met with protests from university students, especially the students from the four pilot universities who were the most impacted. Thousands of students from UI, ITB, and IPB protested the policy and demanded the minister of education, Yahya A. Muhaimin, to increase the budget for higher education. The autonomous university program also met resistance from students from University of North Sumatra during the process of its implementation in the university.

Aside from subsidies, allowances for university officials were also impacted by the budget reduction. Shortly before Satryo assumed as director general, in 1998 President B. J. Habibie issued a decree which designated officials of higher education institute as a functionary, instead of a structural official. This change significantly reduced the allowance they received, sparking protests from university officials all over Indonesia. The directorate general of budgeting, the agency responsible in implementing the new allowance system, stated that the cuts were made due to a lack of fund. Satryo, and the Director General of Basic and Secondary Education Indra Djati Sidi, urged the Directorate General of Budgeting in the Department of Finance to delay the implementation of the new allowance system. Satryo and Indra proposed a new system in which allowance would be made based on the performance of the educational staffs.

=== Distance class ===
In August 2001, Satryo proposed an expansion of the distance education for universities in Indonesia. Satryo's implementation was implemented a month later, with him allowing universities other than the Indonesia Open University could held distance education. However, in a letter directed to higher education officials, Satryo specifically banned higher education institutions in holding distance classes.

The ban on distance class caused turmoil amongst universities, including government agencies that sent their personnel to attend distance class held by higher education institutes. In Kebumen, regent Rustriningsih issued a cease and desist letter to the Chairman of the IPWI School of Economics after the school held unauthorized distance class for civil servants of the Kebumen regency government, which caused financial losses for the local government and personal losses for the participating civil servants. On the same occasion, Satryo's directorate general began cracking down on the distance classes held by ITB, UGM, and the Padjadjaran University (Unpad) in Jakarta, and the Bogor Agricultural Institute in Riau and the Riau Island. IPB claimed that their activity in Riau and Riau Islands was not distance class, but a special program to "accelerate the development of human resources in the region."

ITB, UGM, and Unpad refused to close their distance class in Jakarta, claiming that their distance classes maintain the same quality as their on-campus programs and that their programs adhere to strict academic standards. As a result, Satryo threatened to impose administrative sanctions on these universities, including reducing subsidies, delaying faculty promotions, and halting other services. ITB and Unpad promptly closed their distance classes after the threat was issued. UGM, however, insisted on opening its distance class and dismissed the treat as unreasonable and far-fetched. Satryo's insistence in banning distance class was questioned by members of the House of Representative.

In response to UGM's refusal, Satryo struck a deal with the World Bank to suspend the Quality Undergraduate Education (QUE) aid for the university. UGM, however, never received a formal letter from the World Bank regarding the aid suspension, and the university continued opening their distance class, including in the eastern region of Papua.

=== Degree mill ===
In early 2000, the Department of National Education announced a crackdown on degree mills in Indonesia. As the authority on closing down these degree mills was on the police, Satryo's directorate general could only issue a warning.

== Minister of Higher Education, Science, and Technology ==
On 21 October 2024, Satryo was appointed as the Minister of Higher Education, Science, and Technology under the President Prabowo Subianto's Red White Cabinet.

Satryo resigned from his position as minister on 19 February 2025, citing underperformance. He was replaced by Brian Yuliarto. Senior researcher at Citra Institute, Efriza, previously predicted that he could be replaced in a reshuffle due to the student-led protests in February 2025.

== Controversy ==
In January 2025, 235 civil servants in the Ministry of Higher Education, Science, and Technology protested against Satryo for his grumpy attitude, assault against one of his employees, and unilateral dismissal of a civil servant who is in charge of the ministry's housekeeping and public relations.
