= Oetit Koswara =

Indonesian soil scientist

Director of Research and Community Service Development
- In office 1987 – 14 March 1989
- Preceded by: Yuhara Sukra
- Succeeded by: Jajah Koswara

Personal details
- Born: 1929
- Died: 19 February 2014 (aged 84–85) Bogor, West Java, Indonesia
- Spouse: Jajah Koswara (m. 1964)
- Education: University of Indonesia (Ir.); University of Kentucky (M.Sc.); Iowa State University (Ph.D); Bogor Institute of Agriculture (Prof.)

Academic background
- Thesis: Availability of added P in different Iowa soils (1966)
- Doctoral advisor: John J. Hanway

Academic work
- Discipline: Agricultural science
- Sub-discipline: Soil science
- Notable students: Lutfi Ibrahim Nasoetion

Oetit Koswara (1929 – 19 February 2014) was an Indonesian soil scientist who was a full professor of soil sciences at the Bogor Institute of Agriculture (IPB). He held a number of offices in IPB and the Indonesian government, such as the dean of IPB's Faculty of Agriculture from 1970-1971, 1972-1973, and 1983-1986, the from 1970 until 1978, Head of Land and Crop Research and Development Agency in the Department of Agriculture from 1975 until 1977, and Director of Research and Community Service Development from 1987 until 1989.

== Education and career ==
Born in 1929, Oetit entered the agriculture faculty of the University of Indonesia in 1952 and studied soil sciences. He became an assistant lecturer during his time as a student and graduated from the university in 1960. He received his master's degree in agronomy from the University of Kentucky in 1963 and his doctor of sciences in soil fertility from the Iowa State University in 1966. His doctoral thesis researched the availability of phosphorus in Iowan soils, with John J. Hanway as his advisor.

Upon his return to Indonesia, from 1967 to 1970 was appointed as the chair of the soil sciences department in the Bogor Institute of Agriculture. He also taught in the department and advised a number of students, including Lutfi Ibrahim Nasoetion, who later became Chief of the National Land Agency. He was involved in the research of several government projects, such as the tidal rice field clearing project in 1969, which surveyed a number of lands in Indonesia to be utilized as rice field, and land clearing research in 1977 in preparation of the government's transmigration program. He also supervised a project between IPB and the Sukabumi regional government to implement a new farming system in the region.

After serving as the chair of the soil sciences department, Oetit was promoted as the dean of IPB's Faculty of Agriculture. He served three non-consecutive terms: 1970 to 1971, 1972 to 1973, and from 1983 to 1986. He also became chairman of IPB's development body from 1970 until 1978. In 1977, Oetit was appointed as a full professor in soil sciences.

Oetit was also involved in government agencies. From March 1975 to 1977, Oetit became the Head of Land and Crop Research and Development Agency in the Department of Agriculture. About a decade later, from 1987 until 1989, Oetit became the Director of Research and Community Service Development in the Directorate General of Higher Education. He was replaced as director by his own wife.

== Personal life ==
Oetit was married to Jajah Koswara, a fellow professor in IPB, in 1964. The couple has two children. Oetit died on 19 February 2014 and was buried at the Giritama Cemetery.
