= Indradjid Soebardjo =

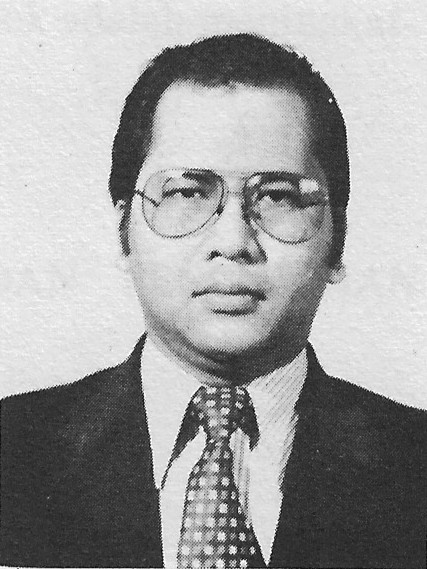

Chair of the Rectorium of the National Institute of Science and Technology
- In office 2002–2006
- Preceded by: Fuad Afdhal
- Succeeded by: Koesnadi Hardjasoemantri

Dean of the University of Indonesia Faculty of Engineering
- In office 1982 – 11 September 1990
- Preceded by: Frits Bernhard Mewengkang
- Succeeded by: Todung Barita Lumban Raja

Personal details
- Born: July 27, 1946 Purwokerto, Indonesia
- Died: August 31, 2006 (aged 60)
- Education: University of Indonesia (Ir., MM)

Indradjid Soebardjo (27 July 1946 – 31 August 2006) was an Indonesian scholar and engineer. He was the dean of the University of Indonesia faculty of engineering from 1982 to 1990, and the Chair of the Rectorium of the National Institute of Science and Technology from 2002 until his death in 2006

== Early life and education ==
Indradjid was born in Purwokerto on 27 July 1946. Upon completing high school in 1964, he studied at the newly opened engineering faculty of the University of Indonesia, which was established under the initiatives of several CONEFO engineers. As a student, Indradjid became a member of the executive council of the engineering faculty's student senate from 1964 to 1969 and was the commander of the university's student regiment from 1966 to 1969. Indradjid graduated from the faculty as an engineer in 1972 with a thesis on videotelephony. In 1988, while still being the dean of the engineering faculty, Indradjid pursued a master's in international finance at the University of Indonesia. He graduated with a Master of Management degree on 22 June 1991.

== Academic career ==
Upon graduating from the faculty, Indradjid joined the university computer science center and became a lecturer at the engineering faculty. He attended a number of computer seminar abroad, such as a seminar on distributed data processing held in Singapore in June 1977, on world computer trends in Nice, France, in November 1978, and on database management in Bangkok in August 1979.

Frits was appointed as the deputy dean for student and alumni affairs under dean Frits Bernhard Mewengkang. He oversaw the establishment of the faculty's alumni association and became its inaugural chair from 1978 until 1986. After Mewengkang was appointed as the director of the University of Indonesia Polytechnic in 1982, Indradjid succeeded him as dean. He was re-appointed for a second term on 27 April 1987 until his replacement by Todung Barita Lumban Raja—his deputy for academic affairs—on 11 September 1990.

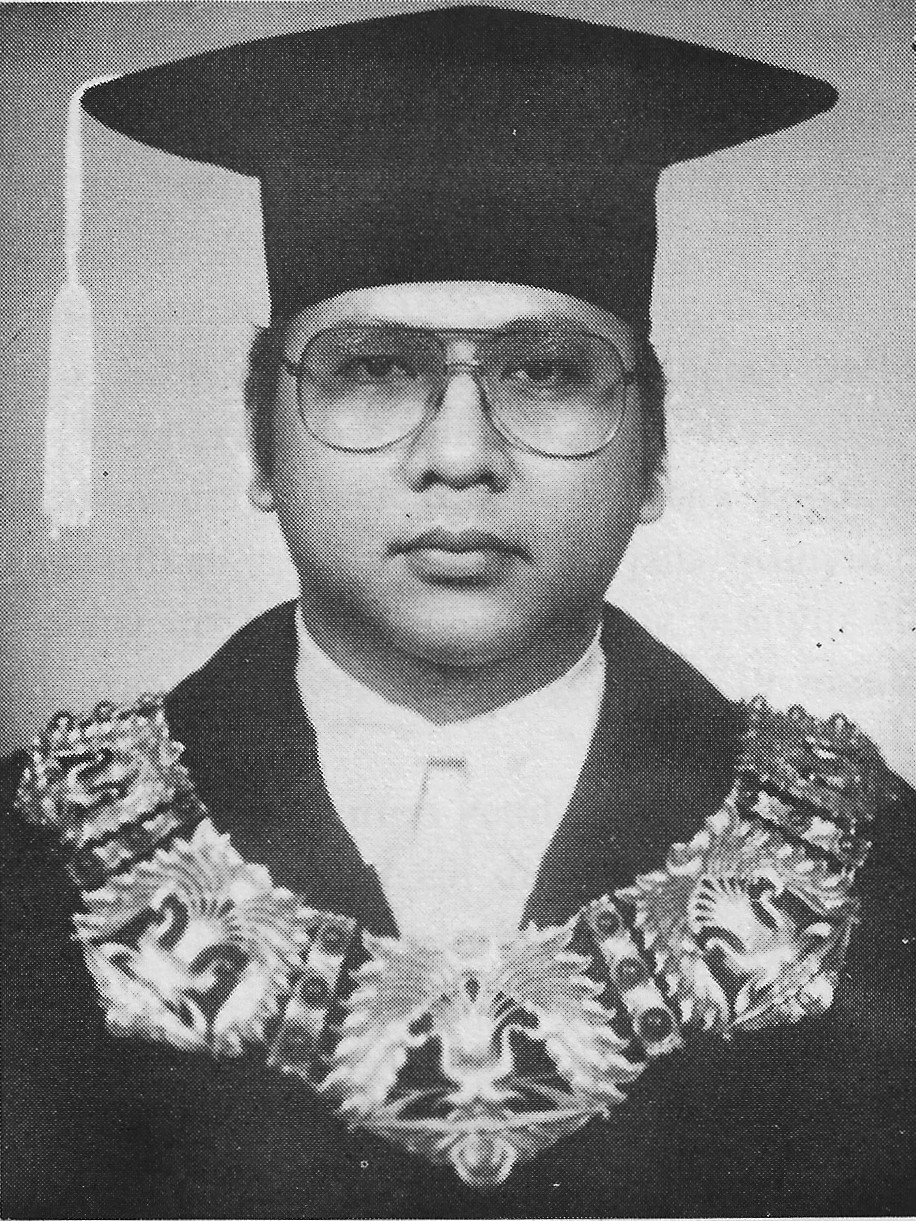
Indradjid Soebardjo wearing his academic robe as dean.

As dean, Indradjid used his connections with research minister B. J. Habibie to benefit the faculty from Habibie's crash output program, which was intended to accelerate the production of Indonesian engineers. Indradjid used the funds from the crash program to provide additional income for engineering faculties. He sent engineering faculties to pursue postgraduate studies abroad, including future dean Rinaldy Dalimi and director general Andy Noorsaman, and advocated for a separate room for lecturers in faculty offices. He oversaw the opening of the gas and petrochemical engineering major, which was chaired by Honorius Rachmantio. The engineering faculty was also responsible for planning the move of the university's campus from Jakarta to Depok. Triatno Yudoharyoko from the faculty's technological was put in charge of designing the faculty's building in the Depok campus. Indradjid personally envisaged the construction of the parents association building and a faculty musalla.

Upon retiring from dean, Indradjid became the director of the faculty's center for strategic technology. His contribution to the finance department led to his appointment as an expert staff to the department's secretary general around the same time. In 2002, he was entrusted as the deputy chairman of the rector election committee, which was responsible for selecting candidates for the UI rector election. The election was the first of its kind following the university's transformation into an autonomy state agency a year earlier.

Outside the government, Indradjid was a member of the Cikini Education Foundation. He was entrusted to lead the foundation's university, the National Institute of Science and Technology, as the chair of the rectorium from 2002 until his death on 31 August 2006.
