= Ministry of Higher Education, Science, and Technology (Indonesia) =

Government ministry of Indonesia

- Kementerian Pendidikan Tinggi, Sains, dan Teknologi
- As Indonesian education icon, the ministry shares the same emblem as the Ministry of Primary and Secondary Education

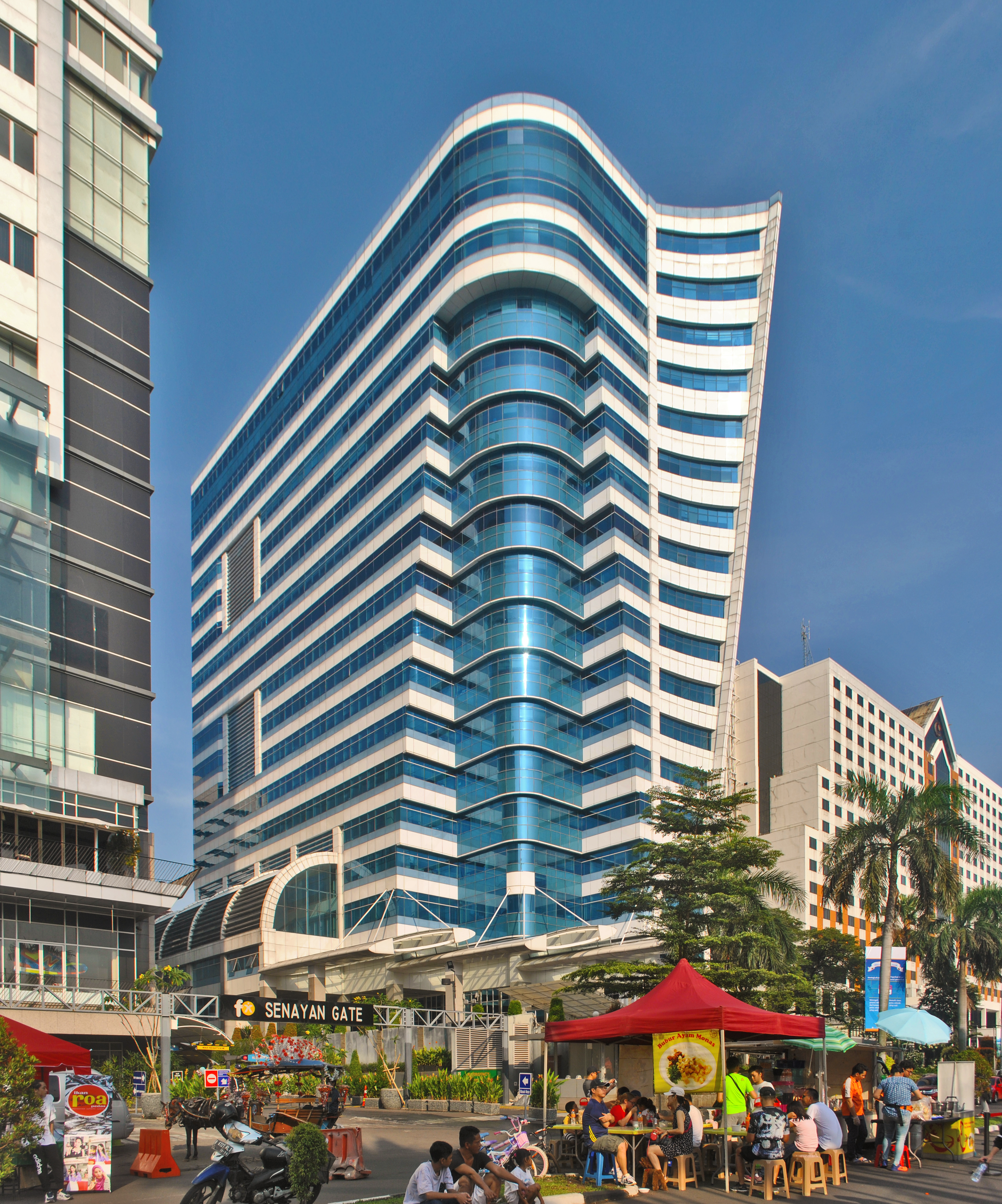
- Ministry of Higher Education, Science, and Technology headquarters

Ministry overview
- Formed: 3 March 1961; 65 years ago (under Minister of College and Knowledge); 21 October 2024; 22 months ago as its current form
- Preceding Ministry: Directorate General of Higher Education, Research, and Technology, Ministry of Education, Culture, Research, and Technology
- Jurisdiction: Government of Indonesia
- Headquarters: Jl. Jend. Sudirman, Gate 1 Senayan, Building D, Jakarta, Indonesia 10270; 6.22387524380379°S 106.80362562665354°E
- Annual budget: Rp57,68 trillion (2025); Rp14.3 trillion (Efficiency); Rp43.38 trillion (2025 State Budget)
- Minister responsible: Brian Yuliarto, Minister of Higher Education, Science, and Technology
- Deputy Ministers responsible: Fauzan, First Deputy Minister of Higher Education, Science, and Technology; Stella Christie, Second Deputy Minister of Higher Education, Science, and Technology
- Website: kemdiktisaintek.go.id

The Ministry of Higher Education, Science, and Technology (Indonesian: Kementerian Pendidikan Tinggi, Sains, dan Teknologi, abbreviated as Kemendiktisaintek) is an Indonesian ministry tasked with organizing and implementing policies in Higher Education, Science, and Technology. Currently, the Ministry of Higher Education, Science, and Technology has been led by Brian Yuliarto.

== History ==
In the Working Cabinet (2014–2019), this ministry was in the form of a directorate general and was placed under the Ministry of Research, Technology, and Higher Education. In the next cabinet, namely the Onward Indonesia Cabinet (2019–2024), it was named the Directorate General of Higher Education, Research, and Technology under the Ministry of Education, Culture, Research, and Technology. In the Red and White Cabinet (2024–2029), the Directorate General of Higher Education was separated from the Ministry of Education, Culture, Research, and Technology to become a separate ministry.

Former minister Satryo revealed the ministry was supposed to fuse with the National Research and Innovation Agency (BRIN) in the original design of President Prabowo Subianto and Vice President Gibran Rakabuming Raka. However, BRIN resisted to fuse with the ministry.

On February 19, 2025, Minister of Higher Education, Science, and Technology, Satryo Soemantri Brodjonegoro, resigned, citing unmet government expectations during his four-month tenure. President Prabowo Subianto accepted his resignation and appointed ITB Professor Brian Yuliarto as the new minister. The inauguration ceremony was attended by key cabinet members, though Satryo was notably absent.

== Organization ==
Based on Presidential Decree No. 189/2024, and as expanded by Ministry of Higher Education, Science, and Technology Decree No. 1/2024 the Ministry of Higher Education, Science, and Technology is organized into the following:

- Office of the Minister for Higher Education, Science, and Technology
- Office of the First Deputy Minister for Higher Education, Science, and Technology
- Office of the Second Deputy Minister for Higher Education, Science, and Technology
- General Secretariat
  - Bureau of Planning and Partnerships
  - Bureau of Finance and State Properties
  - Bureau of Organization and Human Resources and Development
  - Bureau of Legal Affairs
  - Bureau of General Affairs, Public Relations, and Procurement
    - Division of Household Affairs and Leadership Administration
    - Division of Public Relations and Protocols
    - Division of Procurement
- Directorate General for Higher Education (Directorate General I)
  - Directorate General for Higher Education Secretariat
    - Division of Program and Reporting
    - Division of Finance and General Affairs
  - Directorate of Learning and Student Affairs
    - Sub-directorate of Quality Assurance
  - Directorate of Institutional Affairs
    - Sub-directorate of Higher Education Institutional Development and Administrative Management
  - Directorate of Resources
    - Sub-directorate of Lecturers and Education Personnel Management
    - Sub-directorate of Infrastructures
- Directorate General for Research and Development (Directorate General II)
  - Directorate General for Research and Development Secretariat
    - Division of Program and Reporting
    - Division of Finance and General Affairs
  - Directorate of Talent Fostering for Research and Development
  - Directorate of Research and Community Services
  - Directorate of Downstreaming and Cooperations
    - Sub-directorate of Cooperations
- Directorate General for Science and Technology (Directorate General III)
  - Directorate General for Science and Technology Secretariat
    - Division of Program and Reporting
    - Division of Finance and General Affairs
  - Directorate of Talent Fostering for Science and Technology
  - Directorate of Transformative Learning Strategies and Learning
  - Directorate of Dissemination and Utilization of Science and Technology
- General Inspectorate
  - General Inspectorate Secretariat
    - Division of Facilitation of Supervisory Reports Follow-up
    - Division of General Affairs
  - Inspectorate I
  - Inspectorate II
  - Investigative Inspectorate
- Centers
  - Center for Data, Information, and Technology
    - Division of Electronic Governance System Management and Digital Transformation
  - Center for Higher Education Funding and Assessment
    - Division of Higher Education Funding Facilitation
    - Division of Higher Education Assessment Management
- Board of Experts
  - Senior Expert to the Minister on Regulations
  - Senior Expert to the Minister on Economics and Social Affairs
  - Senior Expert to the Minister on Higher Education, Science, and Technology Ecosystem Strengthening

== List of Ministers of Higher Education ==
- Iwa Kusumasumantri (March 3, 1961 - November 13, 1962)
- Thojib Hadiwidjaja (March 6, 1962 - August 27, 1964)
- Syarief Thayeb (August 27, 1964 - February 22, 1966)
- Johannes Leimena (February 24, 1966 - March 18, 1966)
- Mashuri Saleh (March 27, 1966 - July 25, 1966)
- Transferred to Directorate General of Higher Education, Ministry of Education and Culture
- Merged with Ministry of Research, Technology, and Higher Education
  (October 27, 2014 - October 20, 2019)
- Merged with Ministry of Education, Culture, Research, and Technology
  (October 23, 2019 - October 20, 2024)
- Satryo Brodjonegoro (October 21, 2024 - February 19, 2025)
- Brian Yuliarto (February 19, 2025 - present)

== See also ==
- List of universities in Indonesia
- Ministry of Education, Culture, Research, and Technology
