= Iti Octavia Jayabaya =

Indonesian politician (born 1978)

- ᮄᮒᮤ ᮏᮚᮘᮚ
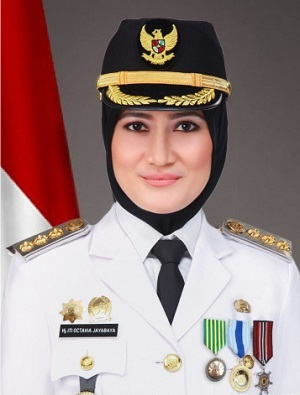

20th Regent of Lebak
- In office 15 January 2014 – 3 November 2023
- President: Susilo Bambang Yudhoyono; Joko Widodo
- Governor: Ratu Atut Chosiyah; Rano Karno; Wahidin Halim
- Deputy: Ade Sumardi
- Preceded by: Mulyadi Jayabaya
- Succeeded by: Iwan Kurniawan (acting)

Member of People's Representative Council
- In office 1 October 2009 – 15 January 2014
- Succeeded by: Zaenuddin
- Constituency: Banten II

Personal details
- Born: 4 October 1978 (age 47) Prabugantungan, Lebak, West Java, Indonesia
- Party: Democratic Party
- Spouse: Mochammad Farid Darmawan
- Children: Siti Maritza Safura Dermawan
- Parents: Mulyadi Jayabaya (father); Nilla Syadrie (mother)
- Education: Jayabaya University; Trisakti University; Padjadjaran University
- Occupation: Politician

Dr. Hj. Iti Octavia Jayabaya, S.E., M.M. (born 4 October 1978) is a politician from Indonesia and a former regent of Lebak.

== Early life and education ==
Iti was born on 4 October 1978 in Prabugantungan, Lebak. She is Mulyadi Jayabaya's first child and spent her childhood with her grandfather. She studied at State Elementary School Cipadang 1, State Junior High School Pandeglang 3, State Junior High School Rangkasbitung 4, and MA Washilaltul Falah in Rangkasbitung. She then continued her higher education at Jayabaya University, where she was an active member of HMI. Afterward, she continued her postgraduate studies at the Faculty of Economy at Trisakti University and graduated in 2005. She then gained a doctoral degree in public administration at Padjadjaran University in 2023.

== Political career ==
Iti is a Democratic Party cadre who became the head of the Democratic Party Lebak branch from 2005 to 2015. In 2017, she was elected as the head of the Democratic Party Banten for the 2017-2021 period. She was then reelected by acclamation as the head of the Democratic Party Banten for the 2021-2025 period.

=== Member of People's Representative Council of Indonesia ===
Iti is a Democratic Party member A - 457. Iti was a member of the DPR-RI for the 2009-2014 period, representing the Banten I electoral district (Lebak and Pandeglang Regency). As a member of DPR, she served at Commission XI and the DPR RI Budget Body.

=== Regent of Lebak ===
During her tenure as regent, Lebak Regency received the Adipura award in 2019 from the Ministry of Environment and Forestry. Some of the policies that she implemented were controlling street vendors in several locations, arranging city parks, and carrying out greening by planting trees on protocol roads.

Iti also discovered a strategy for developing Lebak tourism through Lebak Unique, which has succeeded in increasing the positive image of Lebak Regency. She carried out a tourism development strategy through a city branding approach using four dimensions, namely identity, objective, communication, and coherence. Lebak Unique was chosen because of the uniqueness that highlighted the natural and cultural potential of Lebak Regency to be used as a tourist attraction to improve the regional economy. Lebak Unique also led her to obtain a Doctorate Degree in Public Administration at Padjadjaran University with cum laude results.

Iti managed to get Lebak out of disadvantaged region status in 2019. Apart from that, she also received the Best Regent Award in Asia at the Asia Global Award 2019.

Iti announced that she ran as the candidate for the House of Representatives at the 2024 election in May 2023 and would resign from her position as Regent of Lebak. On November 3, 2023, Iti and her deputy resigned from the Regent and Vice Regent of Lebak, respectively, after their term of office ended, and the position was handed over to an acting regent, Iwan Kurniawan.

== Controversy ==
=== Black magic threat ===
During the 2021 Democratic internal conflict, Iti threatened to send Bantenese witches to do black magic to Moeldoko because he attempted to coup Agus Harimurti Yudhoyono. Her statement received condemnation from internet users. Later, she clarified that she would not do black magic toward Moeldoko because it could lose rewards, and the previous remark was the peak of her emotion about what Moeldoko did.

== Achievements ==
=== Domestic ===
- Karya Bhakti Peduli Satpol PP - Kemendagri 2020
- NGO dan others:
  - Best Regent Award in Asia - Asia Global Award 2019

Political offices
Preceded by Mulyadi Jayabaya	Regent of Lebak; 2014–2023	Succeeded by Iwan Kurniawan (acting)
Incumbent
Party political offices
Preceded by Aeng Haerudin	Head of Democratic Party Banten Branch; 2017–now	Incumbent
