= Jayabaya University =

Private university in Indonesia

- Universitas Jayabaya
- Motto: Kami Bangga Menjadi Milik Bangsa (We Are Proud Becoming Nation's Property)
- Type: Private university
- Established: October 5, 1958
- Founders: Prof. Dr. H. Moeslim Taher, S.H.
- Rector: Prof. H. Amir Santoso, Ph.D.
- Location: Jakarta, Indonesia
- Campus: East Jakarta
- Website: www.jayabaya.ac.id

Jayabaya University is a private university in Jakarta, precisely on Jalan Pulomas Selatan Kav 23, East Jakarta. Founded on October 5, 1958 by Prof. Dr. Moeslim Taher when he was 24 years old. Currently the Rector of Jayabaya University is held by Prof. H. Amir Santoso, Ph.D.

== History ==
At the beginning of its establishment, Jayabaya University began by managing two faculties, namely the Faculty of Law and the Faculty of Economics with a total of eleven students. The first rector appointed was Prof. Mr. A A. Hakim who simultaneously served as Dean of the Faculty of Law.

Then in 1961/1962 the rector of Jayabaya University was handed over to Prof. Dr. H. Moeslim Taher, SH. as the second rector served from 1962 to 1988. He was replaced by Prof. Dr. H. Tb. Achjani Atmakusuma as acting rector in 1988, then rector from 1989 to 1996.

Then he was replaced by Ir. Syamsu Anwar, MS from 1996 to 2000. Then from 2000 he was replaced by Prof. Dr. H.R. Taufik Sri Soemantri Martosoewignyo, SH and in September 2008 was led by Prof. H. Amir Santoso, Phd.

== Faculties ==
Jayabaya University has 8 faculties, namely:

- Faculty of Economics
- Faculty of Law
- Faculty of Social Science and Political Science
- Faculty of Information and Computer Management
- Faculty of Psychology
- Faculty of Communication
- Faculty of Civil Engineering and Planning
- Faculty of Industrial Technology

== Jayabaya Foundation ==
To explore and develop funding sources for the development of Jayabaya University, the Jayabaya Foundation was formed, which was confirmed by Liem Toeng Kie Notarial Deed in Jakarta Number 17 on October 6, 1960, and amended by Notary Deed Muhamad Said Tadjoedin in Jakarta, Number 221 dated August 17, 1983, and copied by Notary Haji Abdul Kadir Usman on March 21, 1997. It was noted that the founders were Moeslim Taher and Yuyun Moeslim Taher.

== Address of campus building ==
Jayabaya University has 2 buildings, namely:

- Campus A is located at Jalan Pulomas Selatan Kav 23 East Jakarta. Administrative Center (Rectorat), Faculty of Law, Faculty of Economics, Faculty of Social and Political Sciences, Faculty of Information and Computer Management, Faculty of Psychology, Faculty of Communication Sciences.
- Campus C is located on Jalan Raya Bogor Km. 28 Cimanggis East Jakarta. Faculty of Industrial Technology with the Department of Mechanical Engineering, Electrical Engineering, and Chemical Engineering. The Faculty of Civil Engineering and Planning fosters 2 (two) departments, namely the Department of Civil Engineering and the Department of Architecture.

== Notable alumni ==
- Eggi Sudjana, Indonesian activist
- Ikke Nurjanah, Indonesian dangdut singer
- Iti Octavia Jayabaya, Regent of Lebak Regency
- Malam Sambat Kaban, former Minister of Forestry of the Republic of Indonesia
- Moeslim Taher, founder of Jayabaya University
- Sylviana Murni, former Deputy Governor of Jakarta candidate
- Muhammad Taufik, Jakarta legislator

== Bibliography ==
- Taher, Kurnia P. Moeslim (2013). Hidup Berakal, Mati Beriman: Perjuangan Pengantin Pendidikan Prof. Dr. H.M. Moeslim Taher, S.H., Prof. Dr. Hj. Yuyun Moeslim Taher, S.H., Membesarkan Universitas Jayabaya [Life Have Sense, Die Have Faith: the Struggle of the Education Bride Prof. Dr. H.M. Moeslim Taher, S.H., Prof. Dr. Hj. Yuyun Moeslim Taher, S.H., Raising Jayabaya University] (in Indonesian). Jakarta: Gilang Media Adworks.
- Jakarta Provincial Government (January 1, 2013) [first published 2005 (as book version)]. "Jayabaya, Universitas" [Jayabaya University]. Ensiklopedi Jakarta (in Indonesian). Jakarta: Department of Culture and Museum of Jakarta Special Region Provincial Government.
- "Sejarah Universitas Jayabaya" [History of Jayabaya University]. Jayabaya University official website (in Indonesian).
- "Universitas Jayabaya | Ranking & Review". uniRank. Archived from the original on September 24, 2018.
- Fir (December 10, 2007). "Profil Kampus: Universitas Jayabaya" [Campus Profile: Jayabaya University]. OkeZone.com (in Indonesian).
- Harahap, Rachmad Faisal (October 2, 2014). "Setengah Abad, Jayabaya Koleksi Prestasi" [Half Century, Jayabaya Collects Achievements]. OkeZone.com (in Indonesian).
