= Brian Yuliarto =

Indonesian academic and politician (born 1975)

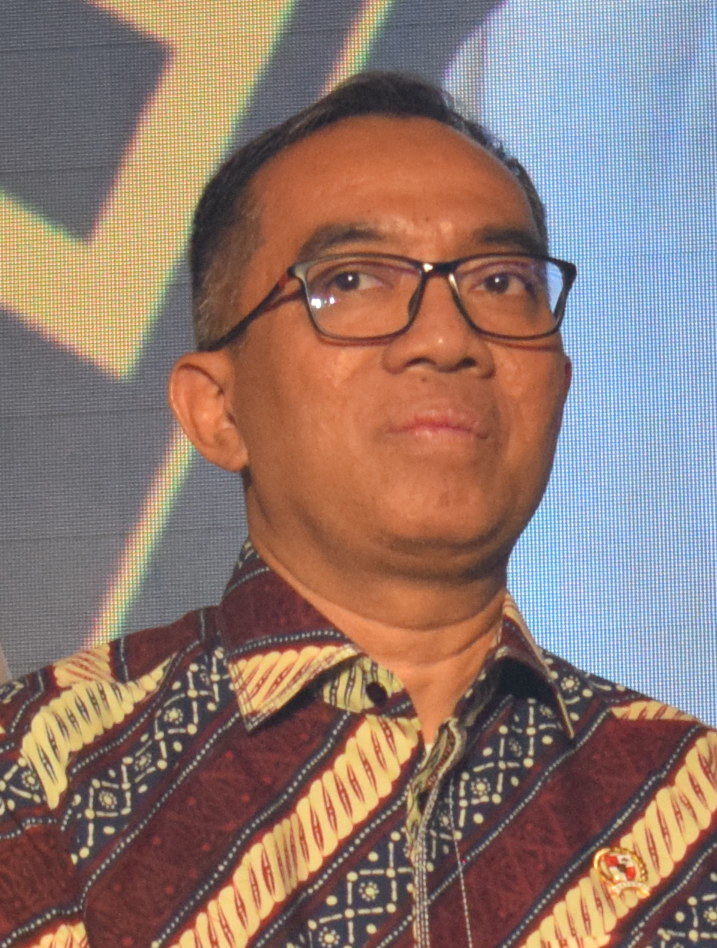

7th Minister of Higher Education, Science, and Technology
- Incumbent
- Assumed office 19 February 2025
- President: Prabowo Subianto
- Deputy: Fauzan; Stella Christie
- Preceded by: Satryo Brodjonegoro

Personal details
- Born: 27 July 1975 (age 51) Jakarta, Indonesia
- Spouse: Levy Olivia Nur
- Children: 3
- Education: Bandung Institute of Technology (S.T., Prof.); University of Tokyo (MEng, PhD)

Academic background
- Thesis: Effect of Tin Addition on Mesoporous Silica Thin Film and Its Application for Surface Photovoltage NO2 Gas Sensor (2004)

Academic work
- Discipline: Engineering
- Sub-discipline: Nanotechnology

Brian Yuliarto (born 27 July 1975) is an Indonesian academic and professor of nanotechnology at the Bandung Institute of Technology. He is currently serving as the Minister of Higher Education, Research, and Technology since 19 February 2025. Previously, Brian served as Dean of the Faculty of Industrial Technology (2020–2024) and Vice Rector for Research and Innovation at the Bandung Institute of Technology (2025–2030). In his daily role, he is a lecturer and Professor at the ITB Faculty of Industrial Technology.

== Education ==
Brian Yuliarto was born on 27 July 1975, in Jakarta, Indonesia. He completed high school at SMA Negeri 14 Jakarta. He completed his undergraduate studies in Engineering Physics at the Bandung Institute of Technology in 1999 and then pursued his master's and doctoral degrees in Quantum Engineering and System Science at the University of Tokyo, Japan in 2002 and 2005, respectively.

== Academic career ==
Brian served as the Dean of the Faculty of Industrial Technology at ITB from 2020 to 2024. He is currently a visiting professor at Tsukuba University, a role he has held since 2021. In addition to his academic roles, Brian's research focuses on the development of nanotechnology-based sensors for detecting hazardous gases, environmental pollutants, and diagnosing diseases like cancer, hepatitis, and dengue fever.

Brian has authored over 326 publications in international journals indexed by Scopus, with 5,506 citations and an h-index of 43. On Google Scholar, he has 410 publications with 6,600 citations. His awards include the Habibie Prize in 2024, recognition as the top researcher in Nanoscience & Nanotechnology in Indonesia in 2023 and being listed among the world's top 2% of scientists in 2024. He was named the best researcher at ITB in 2021 and received the outstanding lecturer award in science and technology at ITB in 2017.

Brian also serves as the Chairman of the Muhammadiyah Cibeunying Kaler Branch Board, Bandung (2023–2027), and as the Chairman of the Strategic Cooperation Study Institute of the Muhammadiyah West Java Regional Board (2023–2027).

== Ministerial career ==
On 19 February 2025, Brian was named as the Minister of Higher Education, Research, and Technology (Mendikti Saintek), replacing Satryo Brodjonegoro. Immediately prior to this, a group of parents of Beasiswa Indonesia Maju ('Onward Indonesia Scholarships') 4th wave awardees organised a protest front of the ministry's building, since they worried over budget cuts within Kemendikti Saintek. After being inaugurated, Brian pledged swift action to back government programs and stressed the need for immediate internal consolidation to ensure their effective implementation.
