= Rinaldi Firmansyah =

Indonesian businessman

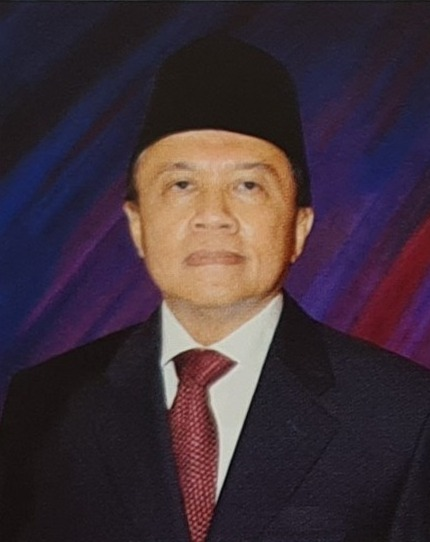
- Born: 10 June 1960 (age 66); Tanjung Pinang, Riau Islands, Indonesia
- Known for: CEO of Telkom Indonesia (2007–2012)

Rinaldi Firmansyah (born 10 June 1960 in Tanjung Pinang, Riau Islands) is an Indonesian businessman.

== Education ==
Graduate of Electrical Engineering (Ir), Bandung Institute of Technology in 1985. Master of Business Administration (MBA), IPMI Jakarta. Chartered Financial Analyst (CFA), AIMR, Charlottesville, USA.

== Work experiences ==
Firmansyah held the position of the CEO of Telkom Indonesia, the main telecommunication company in Indonesia, from 2007 to 2012, before he was Director of Finance. Prior to joining Telkom, he was Commissioner and Head of Audit Committee at PT Semen Padang.

== Family ==
Firmansyah family came from Solok, West Sumatera. His brother is Erry Firmansyah, was the CEO of the Indonesia Stock Exchange between 2002–2009.
