= Tita Larasati =

Indonesian cartoonist and industrial designer

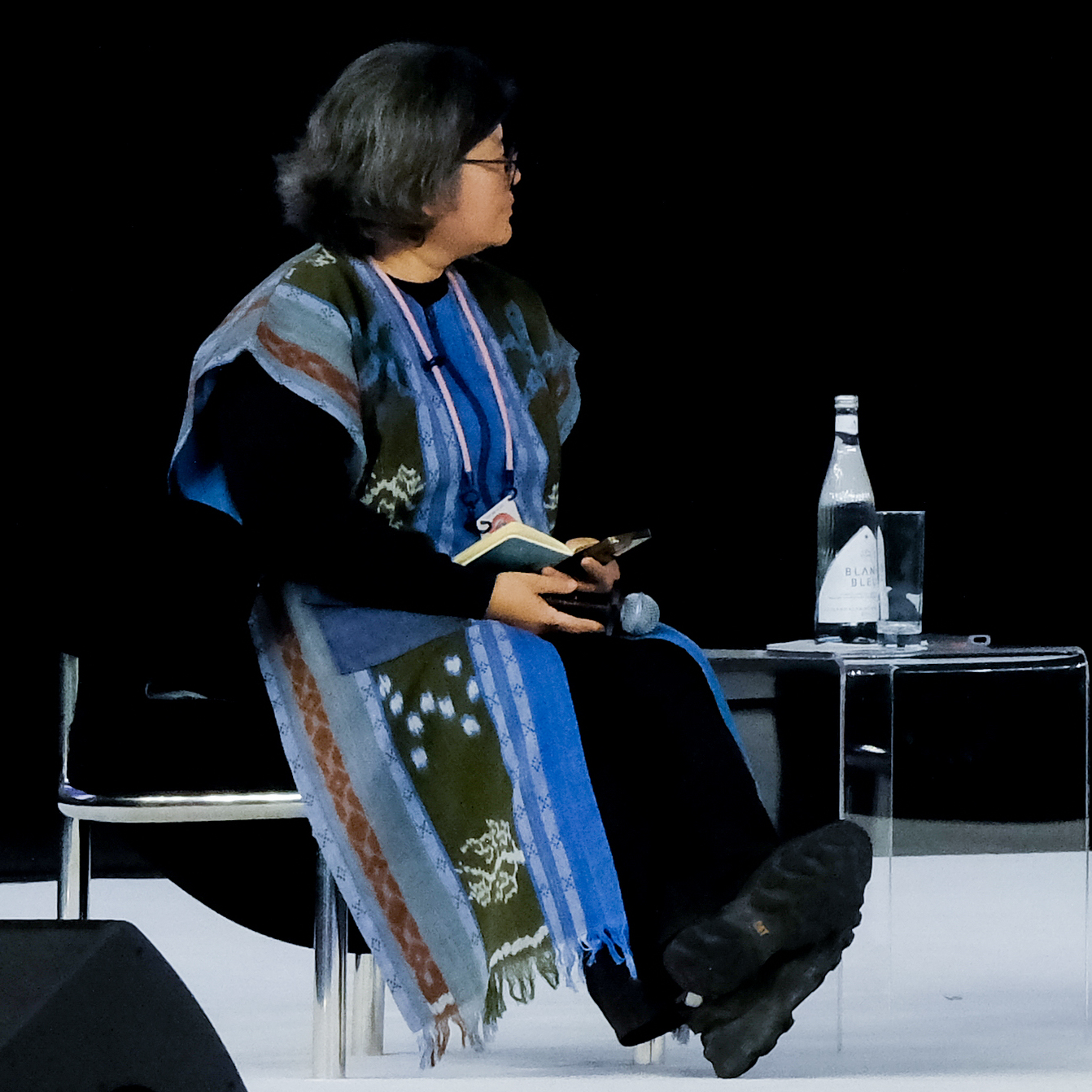
- Born: 1972; Jakarta
- Alma mater: Bandung Institute of Technology; Design Academy Eindhoven; Delft University of Technology
- Occupation: Cartoonist, industrial designer
- Employer: Bandung Institute of Technology

Dwinita Larasati (born December 28, 1972), who also uses the diminutive Tita Larasati, is an Indonesian industrial designer and cartoonist. She is a lecturer in industrial design at the Bandung Institute of Technology (ITB) and her design work focuses on sustainability and the use of bamboo. As an artist and publisher, she is a pioneer in the "graphic diary" genre of autobiographical Indonesian comics.

== Biography ==
Larasati was born in Jakarta and studied at the Bandung Institute of Technology in Bandung. She earned a master's degree from the Design Academy Eindhoven and a doctorate from the Delft University of Technology in 2007.

She began drawing in 1995 while on a design internship in Germany in order to keep in touch with her family. She later said “I was too lazy to write" so she began faxing them autobiographical comics which were photocopied and given to family and friends by her mother.

After her return to Indonesia, she co-founded Curhat Anak Bangsa ("Outpouring of a Nation") with Rony Amandi in 2008, which published graphic diary comics by herself and other women like Sheila Rooswitha Putri and Azisa Noor. Four of Larasati's graphic diary works were published by CAB: Curhat Tita (Tita Tells Her Stories), Transition, Back in Bandung, and Kidstuff. Back in Bandung was the first Indonesian comic book translated into another language, published in French as Retour à Bandung in 2016 by Editions çà et là. Many of her works center on her struggles as an expatriate in Europe and returning to Indonesia after a lengthy absence. She has been cited as a key female Indonesian comics artist who has not been influenced by Japanese manga.

Larasati is the general secretary and one of the founders of the Bandung Creative City Forum (BCCF). She is also chair of the Bandung Creative Economy Committee.

In 2024 she was one of many staff who received long service awards from Reini Wirahadikusumah the rector of the Institut Teknologi Bandung on Independence Day.
