= Karno Barkah =

Indonesian aviation pioneer

Karno Barkah (December 26, 1922 – October 24, 2009) was an Indonesian aviation pioneer and recipient of the prestigious French Légion d'honneur (28 February 1984).

== Information ==
He is most well known for envisioning Indonesia's award-winning Soekarno-Hatta International Airport in Jakarta. Barkah was responsible for the airport's construction, and later became its first President Director.

Barkah served as Indonesia's chief representative to the International Civil Aviation Organization (ICAO) in Montreal, where he was elected as Chairman of ICAO's Conditions of Service Working Group.
