= Bandung Institute of Technology =

Public research university in Bandung, Indonesia

- Institut Teknologi Bandung
- Former name: Technische Hoogeschool te Bandoeng (Dutch)
- Motto: In Harmonia Progressio (Latin)
- Motto in English: Progress in Harmony
- Type: Public research university
- Established: 3 July 1920 (as Technische Hoogeschool te Bandoeng); 2 March 1959 (as Institut Teknologi Bandung)
- Affiliations: ABET, ASAIHL, AUN, EBA Consortium, ASEA UNINET, Global E3, AOTULE, SEATUC, AACSB
- Rector: Prof. Ir. Dr. Tatacipta Dirgantara, M.T.
- Academic staff: 1,207 (as of 2014): Undergraduate: 19 (1.57%); Graduate: 300 (24.85%); Doctorate: 888 (73.57%)
- Students: 27,436 (as of 2022); Undergrad : 19,052 (as of 2022); Master : 6,574 (as of 2022); Doctoral : 1393 (as of 2022); Professional : 417 (as of 2022)
- Location: Jl. Ganesha 10, Bandung, Indonesia; 6.890903°S 107.610378°E
- Campus: Urban 795,646 m^{2}
- Colors: Deep Cobalt Blue
- Mascot: Ganesha
- Website: www.itb.ac.id

The Bandung Institute of Technology (Sundanese: ᮄᮔ᮪ᮞ᮪ᮒᮤᮒᮥᮒ᮪ ᮒᮦᮊ᮪ᮔᮧᮜᮧᮌᮤ ᮘᮔ᮪ᮓᮥᮀ, romanized: Institut Téknologi Bandung; Indonesian: Institut Teknologi Bandung, abbreviated as ITB) is a public research university in Bandung, Indonesia. It has produced many notable leaders in science, engineering, politics, business, academia, and culture. ITB is one of the most prestigious universities in Indonesia.

== History ==
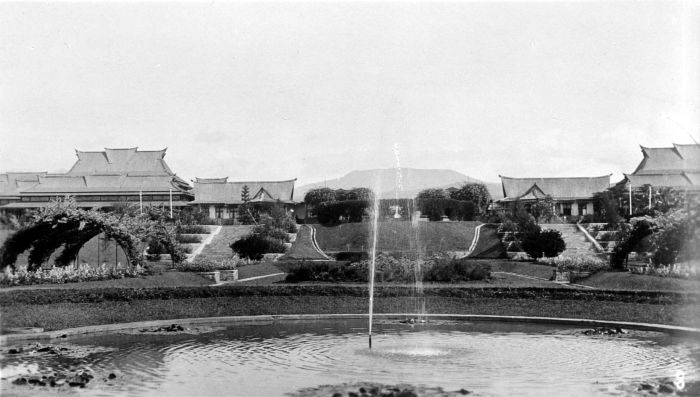
De Technische Hoogeschool te Bandoeng, circa 1924-1932

Bandung Institute of Technology traces its origin to the Technische Hoogeschool te Bandoeng (THB) which was founded during the Dutch colonial era. The project was founded by Karel Albert Rudolf Bosscha, a German-Dutch entrepreneur and philanthropist. His proposal was later approved by the colonial government to meet increasing demand of technical know-how in the colony.

The school building was designed in 1918 by a Dutch architect named Henri Maclaine Pont by blending Indonesian vernacular architecture with modern elements. The school first opened its doors on 3 July 1920. At that time, it only had one active department, the Faculty of Technical Science and one academic major, Department of Road and Water Resources Engineering.

During the Japanese occupation, the school was renamed as the Industrial University by the Japanese administration. This name was short-lived as a few years later, the Japanese surrender paved the way for Indonesia's declaration of independence and the campus was renamed as Technical High School by the newly-declared republic.

A year later, the Dutch colonial government returned and re-occupied Indonesia, taking back control of the campus. The institution was subsequently renamed the Emergency University of the Dutch East Indies (Nood-Universiteit van Nederlandsch-Indië) as the Indonesian National Revolution continued. It was during this time that the campus would begin operating the Faculty of Engineering and Faculty of Science under the University of Indonesia.

On 2 March 1959, the two faculties of University of Indonesia in Bandung were declared separate academic entities. Bandung Institute of Technology was founded for higher learning in natural sciences, technologies, and fine arts.

In 2020, Reini Djuhraeni Wirahadikusumah was appointed as rector of the university until 2025, replacing Kadarsah Suryadi. She became the first female rector since the inauguration of the institute by President Sukarno in 1959. Then, in 2025, Tatacipta Dirgantara succeed her.

== Campuses ==
The ITB main campus, along with its other campuses, covers a total area of about 770,000 square metres (8,300,000 sq ft).

=== Ganesha Campus ===
The original and main campus in Ganesha has a wide range of facilities. Apart from lecture classes and laboratories, the campus has an art gallery, a dedicated sports centre, central library, medical clinic and extracurricular areas.

=== Jatinangor Campus ===
Due to the increasing number of students, the decision was made to develop another campus. The second campus in Jatinangor serves as an integral part of the university and has the same standing as the Ganesha campus. Since August 2023, all freshmen have had their Joint Preparatory Stage (Tahap Persiapan Bersama - TPB) at the Jatinangor Campus.

=== Cirebon Campus ===
ITB plans to build a brand-new campus in Cirebon in anticipation of future research and educational endeavors as a demonstration of the university's commitment to further developing human resources of Indonesia.

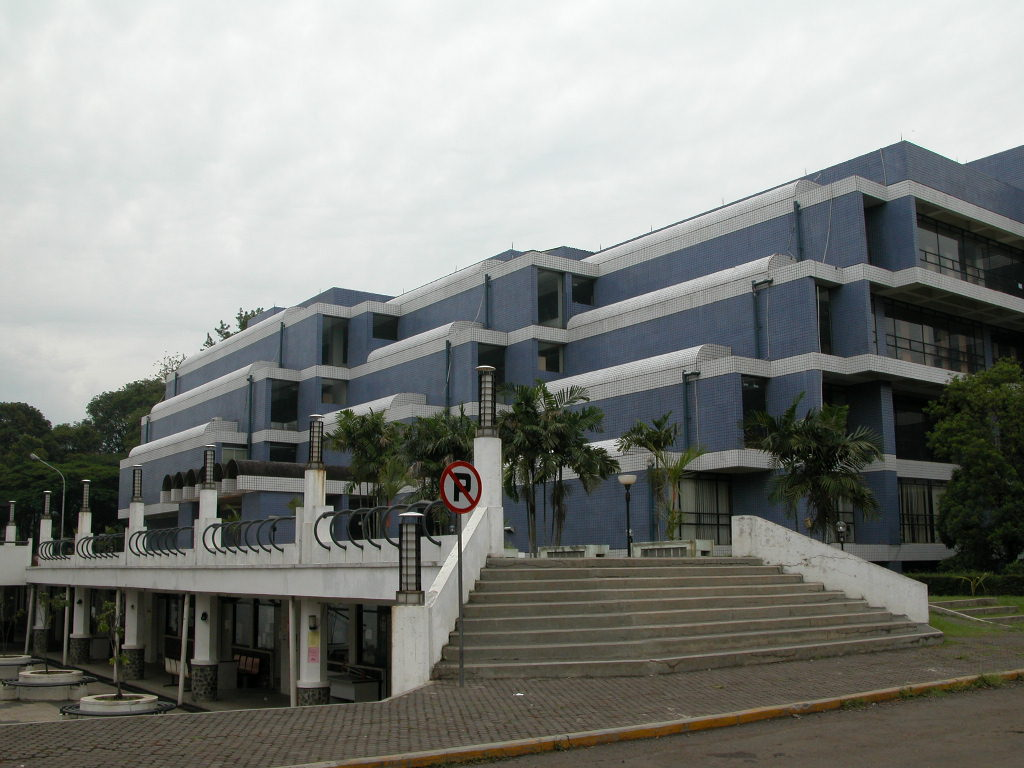
ITB Library in 2007

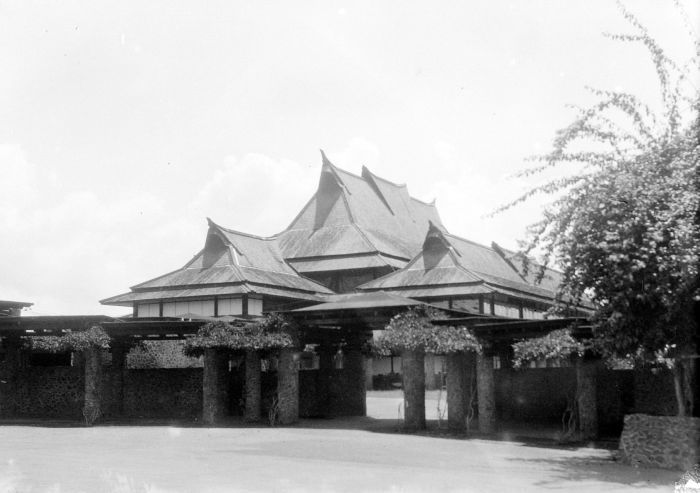
The East Hall of Tecnische Hogeschool in Bandung in 1929

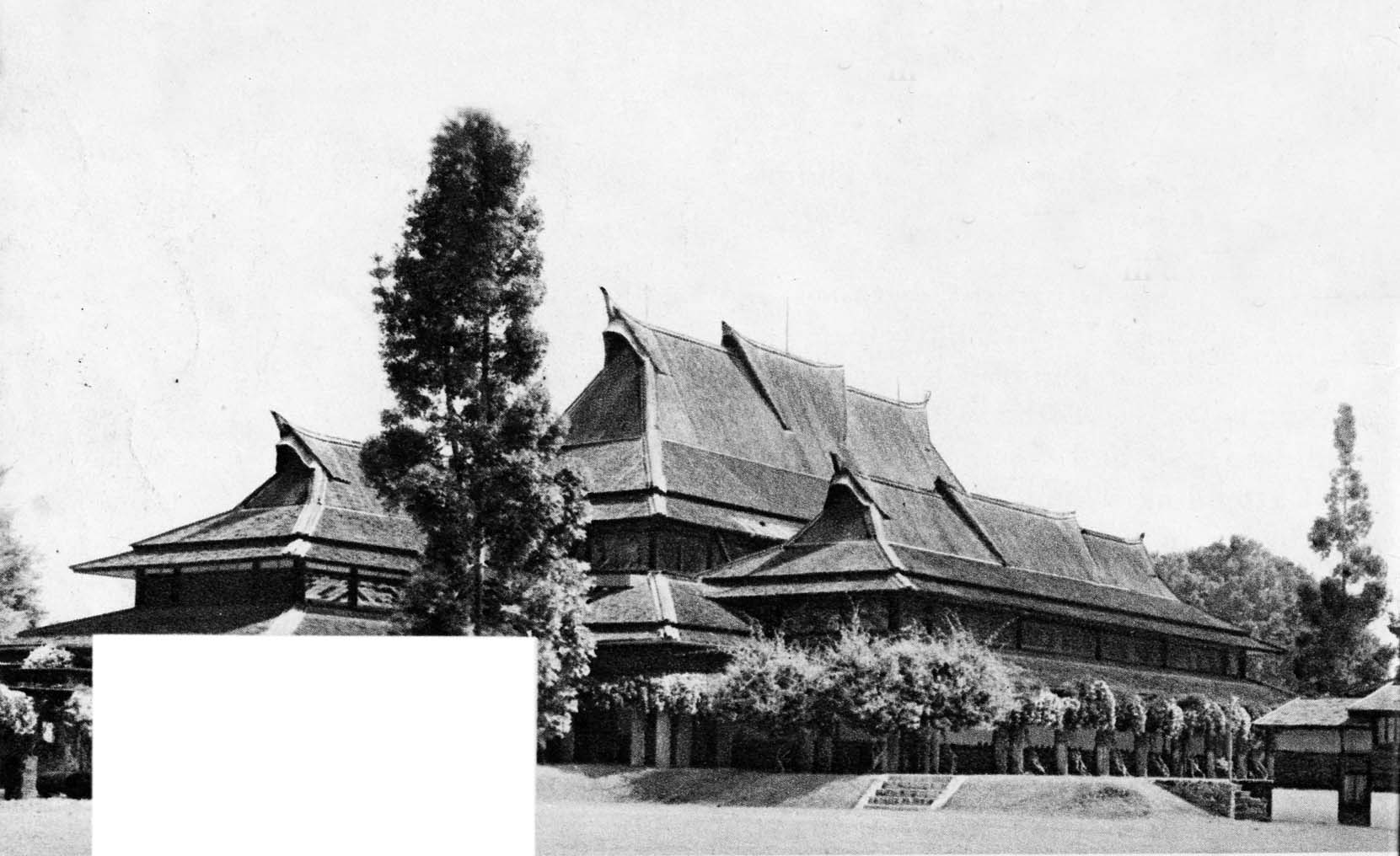
ITB

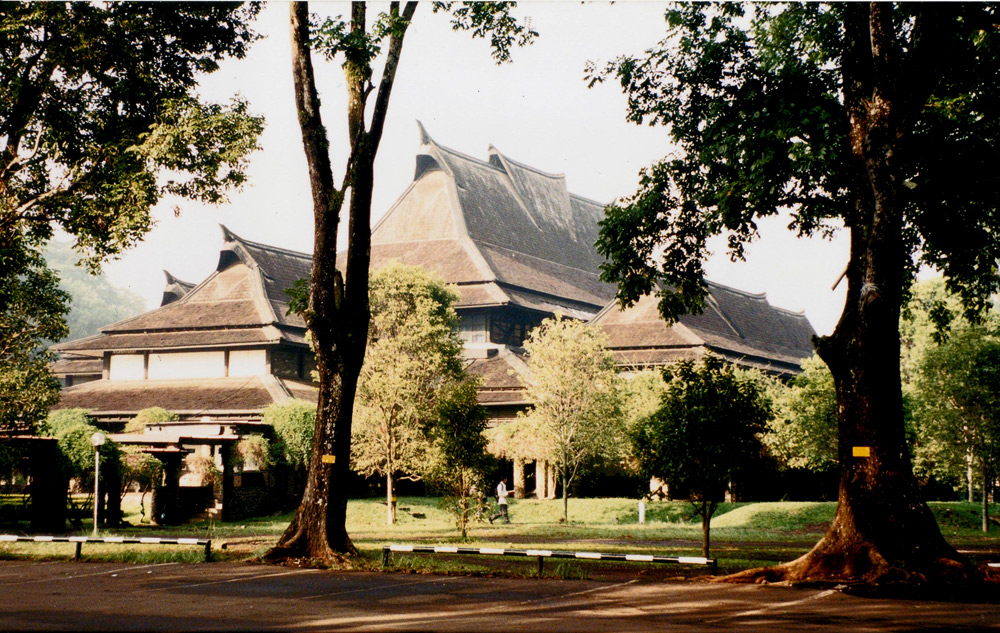
West Hall of ITB

East Hall of ITB

Tunnel of ITB

== Academics ==
Undergraduate statistics
	2026
Applicants	139,399
Admits	5,468
Admit rate	3.92%

=== Admissions ===
In the first semester of the 2026/2027 academic year, ITB admitted a total of 8,945 new students. This number includes 5,468 undergraduate students, 1,947 master's students, 563 doctoral students, and 967 professional program students. Based on gender composition, male students are still more numerous in undergraduate, master's, and doctoral programs. In the undergraduate program, male students make up 57.7%, while female students are 43.3%. In the master's program, the composition consists of 53.7% male students and 46.3% female students. Meanwhile, in the doctoral program, male students account for 53% and female students 47%.

In the undergraduate program, international students come from 21 countries, namely Afghanistan, the United States, Angola, Bangladesh, China, India, Kenya, Madagascar, Malawi, Myanmar, Nigeria, Pakistan, Papua New Guinea, Sierra Leone, Somalia, South Sudan, Sudan, Tajikistan, Tanzania, Timor-Leste, and Yemen.

Enrollment in ITB (2020-2026)
Academic Year	Undergraduates	Magisters	Doctoral	Professions	Total Enrollment
2020–2021	3,905	1,971	212	403	6,491
2021–2022	4,355	2,224	326	372	7,277
2022–2023	5,070	N/A			
2023–2024	4,651	974		44	5,669
2024–2025	4,734	1,503		196	6,433
2025–2026	5,286	1,667	304	414	7,671
2026–2027	5,468	1,947	563	967	8,945

== Rankings ==
University rankings

Global – Overall
- ARWU World: n/a (2022)
- QS World: 255 (2026)
- QS Employability: 301-500 (2022)
- THE World: 1201-1500 (2025)

Regional – Overall
- QS Asia: 59 (2025)
- THE Asia: 35-40 (2025)

ITB was ranked 255th worldwide in the 2026 QS World University Rankings, and 62nd in QS Asian University Rankings 2026. ITB was also ranked 120–150 worldwide by the THE World University Ranking 2023 and 35-40th in the THE Asia University Rankings 2023.

Domestically, the university is ranked 1st by QS World University Rankings and 1st by Times Higher Education. ITB has consistently placed among the top three elite universities in the country, having the highest score threshold in Indonesia's national state university entrance test in 2009. Out of the 422,159 candidates who applied, only 2,000 were successfully admitted.

Apart from STEM-based faculties, the campus also opened a business school called the School of Business and Management (SBM). SBM is considered as the most prestigious and elite business school in Indonesia and regarded as the best business school in Indonesia by eduniversal ranking, global brand magazine and SWA Magazine, the most popular business magazine in Indonesia.

=== Subject ===
QS World University Rankings by Subject 2026

World rank	Subject
51 – 100	Engineering - Petroleum; Mineral & Mining Engineering
101 – 150	▲ Architecture & Built Environment; Art & Design
151 – 200	
201 – 250	▲ Chemical Engineering; Management
251 – 300	▲ Electrical and Electronic Engineering; ▲ Mechanical, Aeronautical & Manufacturing Engineering; Civil and Structural Engineering
301 – 350	MBA
351 – 400	▲ Materials Sciences; ▲ Mathematics; ▲ Chemistry; Agriculture & Forestry
401 – 450	▲ Physics & Astronomy; ▲ Business & Management Studies
451 – 500	▲ Computer Science and Information Systems; ▲ Environmental Sciences
501 – 550	
551 – 600	

QS by Clusters (2026)
Subject	Global	National
Arts & Humanities	▲345	▲3
Engineering and Technology	▲216	1
Life Sciences & Medicine	-	-
Natural Sciences	▲374	1
Social Sciences & Management	▲374	4

THE World University Rankings by Subject 2026
Subject	Global	National
Arts & humanities	-	-
Business & economics	601-800	3
Computer science	601-800	1
Engineering	▲801-1000	▲1
Law	-	-
Life sciences	▼1001+	▼8
Medical & Health	801-1000	▼5
Physical sciences	▲1001-1250	▼4
Psychology	-	-
Social sciences	-	-

== Research ==
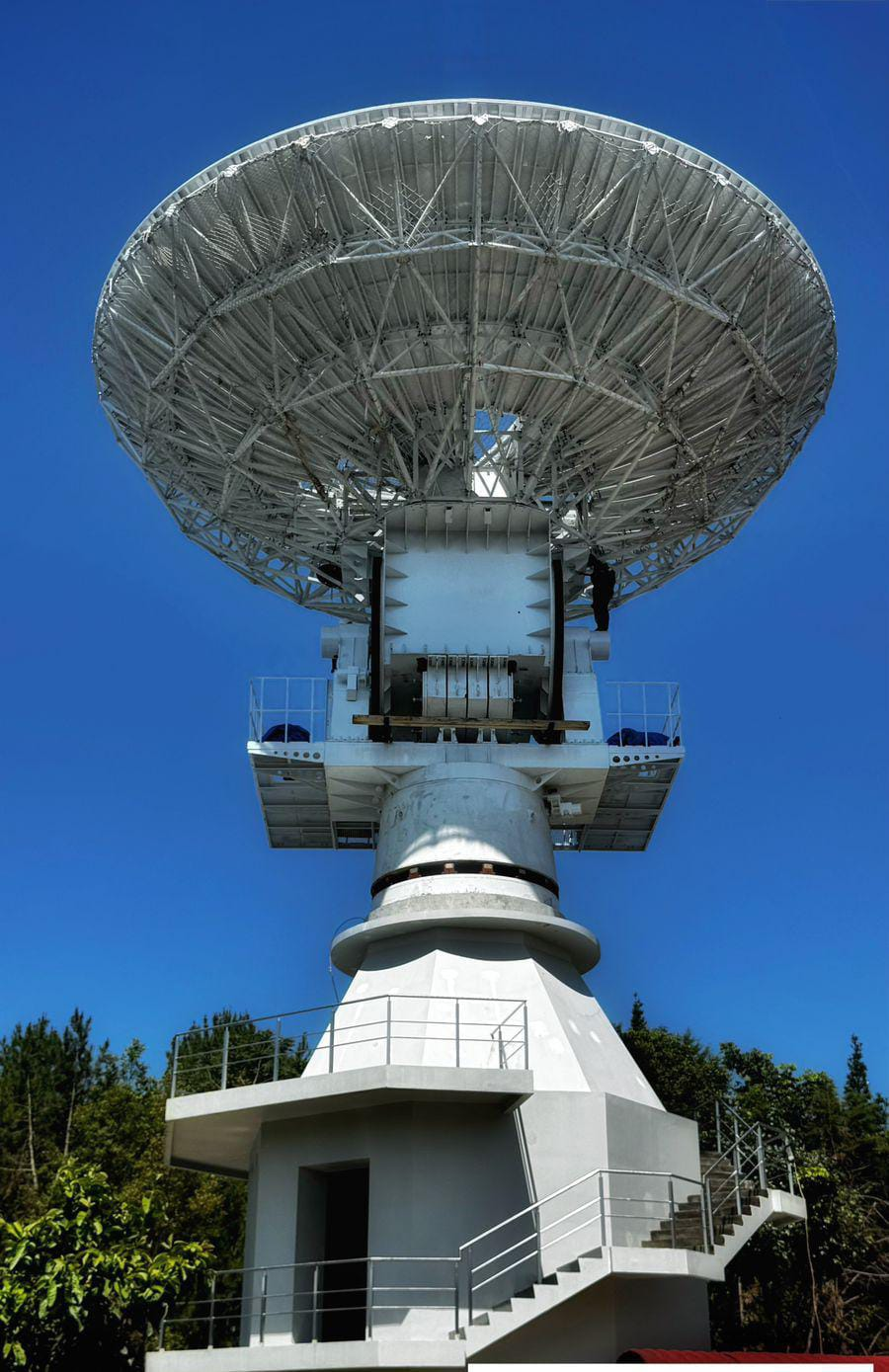
Institut Teknologi Bandung (ITB) and Bosscha Observatory Very Long Baseline Interferometry (VLBI) Global Observing System (VGOS) radio telescope research facility at Lembang.

According to the rector of ITB, the institute built a mining research centre for both national and international research such as research on oil reservoirs, production optimisation, geological exploitation and coal exploitation development worth Rp110 billion ($12.1 million).

== Faculties and programs ==
Consisting of 12 faculties and schools, ITB does not only focus on the fields of STEM but also arts and business management, which have been recognized at national and international levels.

=== Natural Sciences Cluster ===
Faculty of Mathematics and Natural Sciences (FMNS)

(Fakultas Matematika dan Ilmu Pengetahuan Alam (FMIPA))

- Mathematics
- Physics
- Astronomy
- Chemistry
- Actuarial Science

School of Life Sciences and Technology - Science Program (SLST-S)

(Sekolah Ilmu dan Teknologi Hayati - Program Sains (SITH-S))

- Biology
- Microbiology

=== Pharmacy Cluster ===
School of Pharmacy (SP)

(Sekolah Farmasi (SF))

- Pharmaceutical Sciences
- Clinical Pharmacy

=== Engineering Cluster ===
School of Life Sciences and Technology - Engineering Program (SLST-E)

(Sekolah Ilmu dan Teknologi Hayati - Program Rekayasa (SITH-R))

- Bioengineering
- Agricultural Engineering
- Forestry Engineering
- Postharvest Technology

Faculty of Earth Sciences and Technology (FEST)

(Fakultas Ilmu dan Teknologi Kebumian (FITB))

- Geological Engineering
- Geodetic and Geomatic Engineering
- Meteorology
- Oceanography

Faculty of Mining and Petroleum Engineering (FMPE)

(Fakultas Teknik Pertambangan dan Perminyakan (FTTM))

- Mining Engineering
- Petroleum Engineering
- Geophysical Engineering
- Metallurgical Engineering

Faculty of Industrial Technology (FIT)

(Fakultas Teknologi Industri (FTI))

- Chemical Engineering
- Engineering Physics
- Industrial Engineering
- Engineering Management
- Food Engineering
- Bioenergy and Chemurgy Engineering

School of Electrical Engineering and Informatics (SEEI)

(Sekolah Teknik Elektro dan Informatika (STEI))

- Electrical Engineering
- Informatics (Computer Science and Software Engineering)
- Power Engineering
- Telecommunication Engineering
- Information System
- Biomedical engineering

Faculty of Mechanical and Aerospace Engineering (FMAE)

(Fakultas Teknik Mesin dan Dirgantara (FTMD))

- Mechanical Engineering
- Aerospace Engineering
- Material Engineering

Faculty of Civil and Environmental Engineering (FCEE)

(Fakultas Teknik Sipil dan Lingkungan (FTSL))

- Civil Engineering
- Environmental Engineering
- Ocean Engineering
- Water Resources Engineering
- Water Treatment Engineering

School of Architecture, Planning and Policy Development (SAPPD)

(Sekolah Arsitektur, Perancangan, dan Pengembangan Kebijakan (SAPPK))

- Architecture
- Urban Planning

=== Social Sciences, Arts, and Humanities Cluster ===
Faculty of Art and Design (FAD)

(Fakultas Seni Rupa dan Desain (FSRD))

- Fine Art
- Craft
- Visual Communication Design
- Interior Design
- Product Design

School of Business and Management (SBM)

(Sekolah Bisnis dan Manajemen (SBM))

- Management
- Entrepreneurship
- International Business
- Business Administration

== Student loans ==
In January 2024, ITB was reportedly encouraging its students to pay for tuition using loans. This was revealed after an account on Twitter uploaded a photo of a pamphlet containing information on monthly tuition installments managed by a third party. Head of Public Relations ITB, Naomi Haswanto, confirmed that ITB uses financial institutions to help students pay for their tuition and added that the collaboration was carried out using financial institutions that had permission from the Otoritas Jasa Keuangan (OJK). She also added that the collaboration for paying tuition fees via installments had been implemented with the Danacita platform since August 2023 and stated that several other universities had also provided the option of paying via installments. Ministry of Education, Culture, Research, and Technology released a statement and asked the rector of ITB, Reini Wirahadikusumah, to search for a good funding scheme solution after the payment of tuition using an online loan platform went viral and as a mission to provide high quality and inclusive education. The OJK asked for an explanation from Danacita as a platform that offers payment of tuition fees in online loan installments.

On 29 January, hundreds of students marched from the ITB Ganesha campus to the rectorate building to protest against the policy of paying tuition fees using online loan installments. They protested by carrying a number of posters against campus policies which were considered burdensome with the offer of payment via online installments. A number of students then tried to negotiate to meet the ITB rector but it ended in a commotion because they were unable to get the rector to come out and meet the crowd to discuss the problem. Chairman of the KM ITB Cabinet, Muhammad Yogi Syahputra, asked the campus to remove the option of paying via installments which is said to reach Rp. 12,500,000 (USD 790) and demanded to provide a guarantee so that students who had payment arrears could fill out study plan forms which were limited until 30 January. Former Governor of West Java, Ridwan Kamil, said that ITB intentions were good in providing payments using the installment scheme because not all students have the ability to overcome the financial problems they experience. He added that as much as possible, the payment option should not be a burden on students.

== Notable people and alumni ==
ITB has produced many alumni who have played a significant role in nation-building, including:

- Aburizal Bakrie, entrepreneur and politician, former chairman of Bakrie Group, former Coordinating Ministry for Human Development and Cultural Affairs (2005–2009), Chairman of Golkar Party (2009–present), the richest person in Indonesia (Forbes 2007). From 2004 until 2005 Bakrie served as Indonesia's Coordinating Minister for Economy.
- Achmad Zaky, CEO & co-founder of Bukalapak.
- Ahmad Sadali, Abstract Painter and Lecturer at ITB.
- Albert Yonathan Setyawan, Ceramic artist based in Japan.
- Arcandra Tahar, Vice Minister and formerly Minister of Energy and Mineral Resources of the Republic of Indonesia in the Working Cabinet.
- Betti Alisjahbana, businesswoman, former chief of IBM Indonesia.
- Baharuddin Jusuf Habibie, the third President of Indonesia (1998–1999).
- Ciputra, Indonesian real estate tycoon, top 15 the richest people in Indonesia 2016.
- Djuanda Kartawidjaja, Prime Minister of Indonesia (1957–1963).
- Dwinita Larasati - known for her graphic novels.
- Fadel Muhammad, Governor of Gorontalo (2001–2009), Minister for Maritime and Fisheries (2009–2011), Deputy Chairman of Golkar Party.
- Ginandjar Kartasasmita, former speaker of the Indonesian Regional Representatives Council (DPD), former Indonesian Coordinating Minister of Economy.
- Harry Roesli, artist and musician.
- Hartono Rekso Dharsono, the first Secretary General of ASEAN.
- Hatta Rajasa, Indonesian Coordinating Minister of Economy (2009–2014).
- Herman Johannes, Indonesian National Hero, member of Indonesia's Supreme Advisory Council from 1968 to 1978, and the Minister for Public Works and Energy from 1950 to 1951, member of the executive board of UNESCO from 1954 to 1957, professor, scientist, former dean of Gadjah Mada University.
- Hetifah Sjaifudian, campus activist and politician who became a member of the 2009–2014 and 2019–2024 House of Representatives (DPR).
- Hokky Situngkir, scientist.
- Jero Wacik, Minister of Culture and Tourism (2004–2011).
- Jesica Fitriana Martasari Alfharisi, Puteri Indonesia Pariwisata 2019 and Miss Supranational 2019 2nd runner-up.
- Joko Anwar, film director.
- Jusman Syafii Djamal, former Minister of Transportation, former CEO of Indonesian Aerospace - PT Dirgantara Indonesia (Persero), an Indonesian aircraft manufacturing firm, President Commissioner PT. Garuda Indonesia, the biggest Indonesia state-owned airline.
- Karen Agustiawan, former President of Pertamina, the largest Indonesian oil company.
- Karlina Leksono Supelli, philosopher and astronomer. One of Indonesia's first female astronomers.
- Karno Barkah, aviation pioneer, recipient of the French Légion d'honneur, former President Director of the Soekarno-Hatta International Airport.
- Kusmayanto Kadiman, former Minister of Research and Technology of Indonesia.
- Laksamana Sukardi, former Minister of State-owned Enterprises Management, Politician, banker.
- Mangunwijaya, architect, writer, and Catholic religious leader.
- Maria Selena, winner of Puteri Indonesia 2011 and represented Indonesia in Miss Universe 2012.
- Merlyna Lim, professor, internationally recognized science & technology studies scholar.
- Nabiel Makarim, Minister of the Environment (2001–2004).
- Pantur Silaban, physicist in theory of relativity.
- Purnomo Yusgiantoro, Minister of Defense (2009–present), Minister of Energy and Mineral Resources (2000–2009), former President and Secretary General of OPEC.
- Rachmat Witoelar, former Minister of Environment, Special Envoy on Climate Change, Head of National Council on Climate Change.
- Ridwan Kamil, mayor of Bandung from 2013 to 2018, Governor of West Java (2018–present).
- Rinaldi Firmansyah, Former CEO of Telkom Indonesia, the largest fixed-line and wireless telecommunication operator firm in Indonesia.
- Rizal Ramli, former Indonesian Coordinating Minister of Economy, founder and chairman of ECONIT Advisory Group, an independent economic think-tank.
- Roby Muhamad, scientist famous for his work in social networking and small-world networks.
- Samaun Samadikun, scientist dedicated to the development of electronics.
- Sukarno, The first President of Indonesia (1945-1967).
- Taufik Akbar, astronaut.
- Tjokorda Raka Sukawati, inventor of the Sosrobahu construction technique.
