= List of presidential spokespersons of Indonesia =

A presidential spokesman or Spokesperson is an official appointment by the president given to an individual who serves to convey official comments on behalf of the president.

In Indonesia, a presidential spokesman was appointed for the first time during the era of President Abdurrahman Wahid.

List of the Presidential Spokesperson of the Republic of Indonesia ;

Name	Cabinet	Start Position	End of Office	Note
Sukarjo Wiryopranoto	Presidential Cabinet	August 19, 1945	November 14, 1945	State Spokesman
Moerdiono	Fifth Development Cabinet; Sixth Development Cabinet	March 21, 1988	March 16, 1998	Minister of State Secretary
Saadillah Mursjid	Seventh Development Cabinet	March 16, 1998	May 21, 1998	Minister of State Secretary
Dewi Fortuna Anwar	Development Reform Cabinet	May 21, 1998	October 20, 1999	Assistant of State Secretary Minister
Wimar Witoelar (Chief); Adhie Massardi; Yahya Cholil Staquf; Wahyu Muryadi	National Unity Cabinet	October 26, 1999	July 23, 2001	
There was no Spokesperson	Mutual Assistance Cabinet	August 10, 2001	October 20, 2004	
Dino Patti Djalal; Andi Mallarangeng	First United Indonesia Cabinet	October 21, 2004	October 20, 2009	
Dino Patti Djalal; Julian Aldrin Pasha	Second United Indonesia Cabinet	October 22, 2009	October 20, 2014	
Johan Budi	Working Cabinet	January 12, 2016	September 13, 2019	
Fadjroel Rachman	Onward Indonesia Cabinet	October 21, 2019	August 26, 2021	
