= Sitompul =

Batak surname originating in Indonesia

Sitompul is one of Toba Batak clans originating in North Sumatra, Indonesia. People of this clan bear the clan's name as their surname.

- Hotma Sitompul (1956-2025), Indonesian lawyer
- Mananti Sitompul (1909-1980), Indonesian politician
- Manahan Sitompul (born 1953), Indonesian judge
- Ratna Sitompul (born 1961), Indonesian ophthalmologist, academic, and university administrator
- Ruhut Sitompul (born 1954), Indonesian lawyer, politician, and actor
