= Hotma Sitompul =

Indonesian lawyer (1956–2025)

- Born: 30 November 1956; Tanah Karo, North Sumatra, Indonesia
- Died: 16 April 2025 (aged 68); Jakarta, Indonesia
- Education: Gadjah Mada University
- Occupations: Lawyer, businessman
- Known for: High-profile legal cases
- Spouse: Desiree (divorced)
- Children: Stepchild: Bams (former member of Samson)
- Relatives: Ruhut Sitompul (relative)

Hotma Sitompul (30 November 1956 – 16 April 2025) was an Indonesian lawyer and businessman from North Sumatra. He was known for handling high-profile cases, including those involving celebrities.

== Early life and education ==
Hotma Sitompul was born on 30 November 1956, in Tanah Karo, North Sumatra. He graduated from Gadjah Mada University, where he studied law.

== Career ==
Hotma began his career as a staff member at the Legal Aid Institute (LBH), led by senior lawyer Adnan Buyung Nasution. In 2002, he founded his own legal aid institute, Mawar Saron, to provide justice and legal assistance to the poor, the weak, and those unaware of the law.

He also established his own law firm, Hotma Sitompoel & Associates, which handled various legal cases.

Hotma was the stepfather of Bams, a former member of the band Samson, and was related to lawyer Ruhut Sitompul.

== Notable cases ==
Hotma handled several high-profile cases during his career, including:

- 2015 Bali child murder case: Represented Magriet in a widely publicized case against Hotman Paris Hutapea, who represented the victim's housemaid, Agus.
- 2013 Raffi Ahmad drug case: Served as Ahmad's legal counsel
- 2019 Baim Wong civil case: Represented Wong in a dispute with Astrid's QQ Production.
- 2022 Domestic violence case: Represented Rizky Billar in a domestic violence case involving Lesti Kejora, replacing his cousin, Adek Erfil Manurung.

== Controversies ==
Hotma faced public scrutiny when he represented Rizky Billar in a domestic violence case. This drew attention to his own divorce from Desiree in 2021, during which he was accused of evicting her and disputing land and property rights. The couple eventually divorced, and the dispute was resolved amicably.

== Death ==
Hotma died at Dr. Cipto Mangunkusumo Hospital in Central Jakarta, on 16 April 2025, at the age of 68. He had previously undergone treatment in Penang, Malaysia, before returning to Jakarta due to complications.
