= Roy Suryo =

Indonesian politician (born 1968)

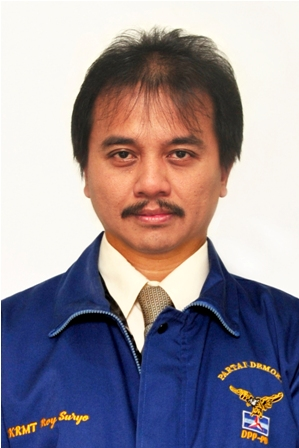

Minister of Youth and Sports
- In office 15 January 2013 – 20 October 2014
- President: Susilo Bambang Yudhoyono
- Preceded by: Andi Mallarangeng; Agung Laksono (Acting)
- Succeeded by: Imam Nahrawi

Personal details
- Born: 18 July 1968 (age 58) Yogyakarta, Indonesia
- Party: Democratic Party
- Spouse: Ismarindayani Priyanti
- Education: Gadjah Mada University

Kanjeng Raden Mas Tumenggung Roy Suryo Notodiprojo (born 18 July 1968), commonly known as Roy Suryo is a former Minister of Youth and Sports of Indonesia for the final 21 months of President Susilo Bambang Yudhoyono's Second United Indonesia Cabinet. A self-proclaimed expert in telecommunications and multimedia, Roy gained celebrity status for analyzing and commenting on the authenticity of evidence in political and celebrity scandals, such as leaked phone conversations and sex tapes. He hosted e-Lifestyle on Metro TV for five years. Before his cabinet role, Roy was a member of parliament representing Yogyakarta Special Region.

== Education and lecturing ==
Roy studied at the Faculty of Communication at Gadjah Mada University (UGM) from 1991 to 2001. He taught at the Department of Photography at the Indonesian Institute of the Arts over 1994–2004. He has also been a guest lecturer at the UGM Communication D-3 Program, teaching photography for several semesters but is not a permanent lecturer at UGM.

== Rise to public prominence ==
Roy first came to national prominence in March 1999, when a tape recording of a telephone conversation between President BJ Habibie and Attorney General Andi Ghalib was leaked to the press. The conversation revealed the judiciary's lack of independence and the government's insincerity toward calls to bring former president Suharto to justice. After Ghalib denied it was his voice on the tape, Roy - then a relatively unknown figure at Gadjah Mada University - said he had used a digital "spectrum analyzer" to ascertain the conversation was authentic. Roy explained he had compared the voice on the tape to one of Habibie's televised speeches, and then to a tape of a comedian impersonating Habibie. The match between the leaked tape and Habibie's speech was much closer than the comedian's impersonation. After announcing his findings, Roy was summoned by the State Intelligence Agency (BIA). Although nervous before the meeting, Roy later said his interrogators had driven him around, treated him to lunch and they had become good friends. Roy then began appearing widely on radio and television, positioning himself as an expert on evidence in numerous ensuing scandals involving politicians and celebrities. He insisted his actions were motivated only by the desire to seek the truth through "pure science".

In August 1999, Roy also analyzed a leaked conversation between key figures in the Bank Bali scandal and declared it to be genuine. Later, he analyzed and declared genuine a photo purporting to show President Abdurrahman Wahid with his alleged mistress, Aryanti Sitepu.

== Political career ==
In 2005, Roy joined Yudhoyono's Democratic Party. In 2009, he was elected to the national parliament, representing Yogyakarta electoral district. He resigned from the legislature in January 2013 after being appointed to replace disgraced Youth and Sports Affairs Minister Andi Mallarangeng. In April 2014, Roy ran for re-election to parliament but lost to fellow Democratic Party member Ambar Tjahyono from Yogyakarta. He accused Ambar of vote-rigging and Ambar was dismissed from the party.

In August 2018, in his capacity as deputy chairman of the Democratic Party, Roy declared the party's intention to support former general Prabowo Subianto in the 2019 presidential election. In September 2018, Roy temporarily resigned from his position as deputy chairman of the Democratic Party, saying he wanted to focus on returning assets to the Youth and Sports Affairs Ministry and did not want the party connected to the case.

In April 2019, Roy stood for re-election to parliament, but he and the Democratic Party failed to win enough votes to have a representative for Yogyakarta enter the national parliament for the 2019–2024 period. Roy attributed the result to "Almighty God" and to "rampant money politics" practiced by other parties.

== Minister for Youth and Sports ==
In early 2013, President Susilo Bambang Yudhoyono appointed Roy Suryo as Minister of Youth and Sports to replace Andi Mallarangeng, who resigned after being named a suspect in a corruption case.

Upon becoming minister, he inherited the challenge of resolving a conflict between rival national football associations: the Indonesian Football Association (PSSI) and the Indonesia Football Saviour Commission (KPSI). The rival camps were led by prominent tycoons Nirwan Bakrie and Arifin Panigoro.

In September 2014, Roy was criticized by Indonesia Corruption Watch (ICW) for taking an official trip with his wife to Europe to promote the Indonesian martial art of pencak silat, as his term as minister neared an end. ICW described the trip as a waste and questioned why Roy's wife was among his 10-member entourage visiting the Czech Republic, Spain and Bulgaria.

After completing his ministerial term, Roy was accused of failing to return state assets until action was taken by the State Audit Board (BPK) in 2016. The Corruption Eradication Commission (KPK) had also called for the swift return of the state assets.

== Controversies ==
The propensity of certain Indonesian media outlets to reproduce Roy's statements verbatim without checking their veracity prompted some Indonesian netizens in 2004 to establish a website (now defunct) called roysuryowatch, which analyzed and criticized his comments quoted in the mass media. He was criticized by some bloggers after commenting that the defacing of government websites was carried out by bloggers and hackers. The feud escalated after he said bloggers were con artists.

In August 2007, Roy announced he had obtained a recording of an original, longer version of Indonesia's national anthem, Indonesia Raya, from Leiden University's library archives. Leiden University Library later denied supplying Roy with the alternative version. It transpired the alternative version had been aired on Indonesian television in 2004 and uploaded to YouTube in December 2006. In August 2013, Roy was criticized after he appeared to forget the lyrics to the national anthem at a football match in Yogyakarta. He explained that he had not forgotten the lyrics, but that the crowd had been singing loudly out of time.

In 2005, when a topless photo alleged to be Miss Indonesia Artika Sari Devi was spread online, Roy claimed the photo was genuine. The photo was later revealed to be that of a Thai transvestite.

On 25 September 2008, Roy's expertise was questioned during the trial of Muslim extremist Rizieq Shihab, who was ultimately convicted and jailed for having incited his supporters to attack an inter-faith rally at Jakarta's National Monument. Rizieq's lawyer said Roy's evidence for the prosecution should be discounted because his educational background is not in telematics.

In October 2008, when a photo circulated showing the regent of Southwest Aceh, Akmal Ibrahim, embracing a woman in bed, Roy declared the photo to be genuine and said the woman was not the regent's wife. Ibrahim insisted the woman in the photo was his wife, Ida Agustina, and reported Roy to police for defamation.

On 26 February 2009, actress sisters Sarah Azhari and Rahma Azhari reported Roy to police, accusing him of publicly disseminating private photos of the sisters bathing naked. The report accused Roy of violating the Criminal Code and Information and Electronic Transactions Law, with a threat of six years in jail. Roy denied any wrongdoing and questioned the health of the sister's legal counsel, saying he only wanted to help the siblings find out who had shared the photos.

In the 2009 trial of actress of Marcella Zalianty and Ananda Mikola, who were accused of kidnapping and abuse, Roy appeared as an expert witness for the prosecution. Ruby Z. Alamsyah, a digital forensic analyst, appearing as an expert witness for the defense, said Roy's testimony was invalid because he has no expertise in international telematics.

In 2009, Roy put himself forward as an expert witness for the prosecution in the defamation trial of Prita Mulyasari, a housewife who was jailed for complaining about being misdiagnosed by a hospital in Banten province.

In 2010, Roy was an expert witness for police in a case involving a leaked sex tape that featured singer Ariel and actress Luna Maya. One of the lawyers representing Ariel and Luna, Boy Afrian Bondjol, alleged that Roy sent a text message to Luna in early June 2010, offering to cooperate with her in handling the case. Boy said the text message read: "Morning Miss, sorry to bother you if you are taking a rest but hope not and get you fresh to reply this. This really takes my serious concern as I've been pondering solutions over the hot issue having been shocking Indonesia lately. If you agree with the conditions; First, in the following week, let media and those who claim to know everything and as IT experts comment, you just keep silent. Second, when I return from Amsterdam next week on June 13, we will make a press conference, and thankfully, all three, Miss, Ariel and I. Just set the place and time. It's up to you Miss." Boy said Roy also suggested that Luna deny the veracity of the sex tape, and that Roy would report the case to Jakarta Police Cyber Crime Department. Roy admitted he had sent text messages to Luna, but claimed he felt tricked by her, because she had denied being in the video and he had initially believed her denial.

In March 2011, Roy and his wife were ejected from a Lion Air flight after trying to take the seats of legitimate ticket holders. Roy blamed Lion Air for the incident.

In April 2012, a sex tape was leaked allegedly featuring Indonesian Democratic Party of Struggle (PDI-P) legislator Karolin Margret Natasa, the daughter of the governor of West Kalimantan. She denied involvement. Roy on 24 April 2012 said he believed the woman in the video was indeed "KMN", but he declined to become further involved in the case to avoid a conflict of interest, as he belonged to a rival party.

In August 2014, Roy was the victim of online fraud perpetrated by a 16-year-old boy in Subang, West Java. The boy had offered for sale a Malaysian bicycle, which usually retailed for about RM990 ($300), for just Rp890,000 ($73). Roy transferred Rp1 million for the bike and its delivery to Jakarta, but the item was never delivered. Roy contacted police, who tracked down and arrested the boy. Indonesian netizens complained that police rarely deal with e-commerce fraud cases involving only a few million rupiah. Roy denied he had been tricked, saying he had deliberately "entered the trap" in order to expose the scammer. He further said police responded swiftly to his report because he has a good relationship with them.

In April 2016, Roy was reportedly fooled by a fake Twitter account set up in the name of President Joko Widodo's son Gibran. The phony account tweeted "Those with their payday, go shopping. Those without salaries, go talk to the government." Roy responded with an attacking tweet: "Tweeps, Twit child without a conscience. Those "without payday" are millions of Indonesians...#AskJOKOWI." In response to mockery that he had been baited by a fake account, Roy said he knew the account was fake all along. He said he had responded to the fake tweet just to elicit reactions from Widodo supporters, whom he referred to derisively as "tadpoles".

=== Wikipedia vandalism complaint ===
On 24 January 2020, Roy filed a police complaint over an edit to the United Nations page on the Indonesian version of Wikipedia. The edit, made on 21 January 2020 and showing scant regard for capitalization, changed the location of the first UN General Assembly from "Westminster Central Hall" in London to "jln setiabudi (sunda atlantis)". It also changed the location of the UN's first temporary headquarters over 1946 to 1952 from a building owned by Sperry Gyroscope Corporation in Lake Success, New York, to "villa isola in lembang, Bandung". Roy said he suspected the edits were made by a cult known as the Sunda Empire, which claims to have founded the UN and NATO. “If we look for the history of the United Nations and NATO, the ones that come up are fake historical references made by the Sunda Empire. This is dangerous,” said Roy. Police said they would investigate the complaint, which alleges violations of the Electronic and Information Transactions Law and the Criminal Code.

=== Jokowi Borobudur meme ===
In July 2022, Roy Suryo was formerly a suspect after posting a controversial meme about the Borobudur statue's face that closely resembles to Joko Widodo on his social media. He was arrested for alleged blasphemy in August 2022, and sentenced to 9 months in prison along with a fine of Rp150 million.

== Personal life ==
Roy married Ismarindayani 'Ririen' Priyanti in Yogyakarta on 10 December 1994.

Political offices
Preceded by Andi Malarangeng	Minister for Youth and Sports Affairs; 2013-2014	Succeeded by Imam Nahrawi
