= O. C. Kaligis =

Indonesian lawyer (born 1942)

- Born: Otto Cornelis Kaligis; 19 June 1942 (age 83); Makassar, Japanese-occupied East Indies
- Occupation: Lawyer
- Spouse: Alfa Lolita
- Children: Andrew Kaligis, Velove Vexia, Bernard Kaligis, David Kaligis, Erick Kaligis

Otto Cornelis Kaligis (born 19 June 1942), also known as O. C. Kaligis, is an Indonesian lawyer.

== Prominent cases ==
=== Setya Novanto and Bank Bali case ===
Kaligis represented deputy Golkar Party treasurer Setya Novanto when he was charged in August 1999 in connection with the Bank Bali scandal. The Indonesian Bank Restructuring Agency (IBRA) had in February 1999 colluded with Golkar officials to force Bank Bali chief Rudy Ramli to pay Rp546 billion to Setya's company Era Giat Prima (EGP) in order to collect Rp904 billion owed by three banks taken over by IBRA. The money was then paid out in more than 150 transfers to politicians and legislators, partly in an effort to buy votes for the re-election of then-president B.J. Habibie. Setya, who was part of Habibie's re-election team, was in 2018 sentenced to 15 years in jail for his role in the case.

=== Sex tapes porn trial ===
Kaligis represented Nazril "Ariel" Irham, lead singer of the band Peterpan, who was in January 2011 convicted of pornography and sentenced to three years and six months in jail over sex tapes made with his celebrity girlfriends Luna Maya and Cut Tari.

=== Omni Hospital misdiagnosis ===
In 2009, Kaligis represented Prita Mulyasari, who was sued by Omni International Hospital in Tangerang, west of Jakarta, for defamation. Prita had written an email complaining the hospital had misdiagnosed her case of mumps as dengue fever. Omni reported Prita to police and she arrested. Judges dismissed the case, so Omni Hospital filed a civil case and Prita was ordered to pay Rp312 million in damages. When Prita appealed, the High Court upheld the decision. The Supreme Court overturned the damages verdict. In July 2011, Omni Hospital appealed the criminal case to the Supreme Court, which issued a guilty verdict and a suspended sentence. In September 2012 the Supreme Court overturned its guilty verdict. Kaligis defended Prita pro bono.

=== Nazaruddin SEA Games bribery ===
Kaligis represented Muhammad Nazaruddin, the Democratic Party's former treasurer, who was in 2012 sentenced to four years and 10 months in jail for corruption. Nazaruddin, who had fled to Singapore and was arrested in Colombia, was convicted of accepting bribes for construction tenders for the 2011 South East Asian Games hosted by Indonesia. The Supreme Court in 2013 increased Nazaruddin's sentence to seven years. He also received a six-year sentence for money laundering. Kaligis in 2012 claimed he was still representing Nazaruddin, but rival lawyer Hotman Paris Hutapea said Kaligis had been dismissed.

=== JIS alleged child abuse cases ===
Kaligis in 2014 represented an Indonesian woman who claimed her son was raped by cleaners in a toilet block at Jakarta International School (JIS, later renamed Jakarta Intercultural School). Kaligis accused JIS of tampering with evidence by firing the cleaners and renovating the toilet block. When the mother failed to obtain compensation because JIS was not liable for the cleaners, she declared two teachers at the school had also abused her son. South Jakarta District Court in April 2015 sentenced the teachers to 10 years in jail. They were acquitted by Jakarta High Court in August 2015. The Supreme Court in February 2016 overturned the acquittal and increased the sentences to 11 years. Kaligis also represented the mother in a failed 2015 effort to sue JIS for $125 million.

== Jailed for bribery ==
On 17 December 2015, Kaligis was sentenced to five years and six months in jail for bribing a clerk and three judges at Medan State Administrative Court (PTUN Medan) in North Sumatra province. Kaligis made the bribes through his subordinate, Gerry Baskara, providing Judge Tripeni Irianto Putro with S$5,000 and US$15,000; Judge Germawan Ginting and Amir Fauzi with $5,000 each; and a clerk with $2,000. The bribes were paid in an effort to influence a case involving alleged corruption by North Sumatra governor Gatot Pujo Nugroho and his wife, Evi Susanti. Jakarta High Court in June 2016 increased his sentence to seven years. The Supreme Court in August 2016 increased the sentence to 10 years. Kaligis appealed the sentence increase, claiming it was unfair. A Supreme Court in December 2017 cut his sentence to seven years. The judges who gave the sentence cut were Syarifuddin, Leopold Hutagalung and Surya Jaya.

Kaligis is serving his sentence in Bandung's Sukamiskin prison, where the prison head acknowledged Kaligis has been allowed out of the jail to deal with legal matters in Jakarta. Indonesia's Corruption Eradication Commission has stated that leave permits are sold to corruption convicts at the prison.
