= Agus Raharjo =

Indonesian civil servant

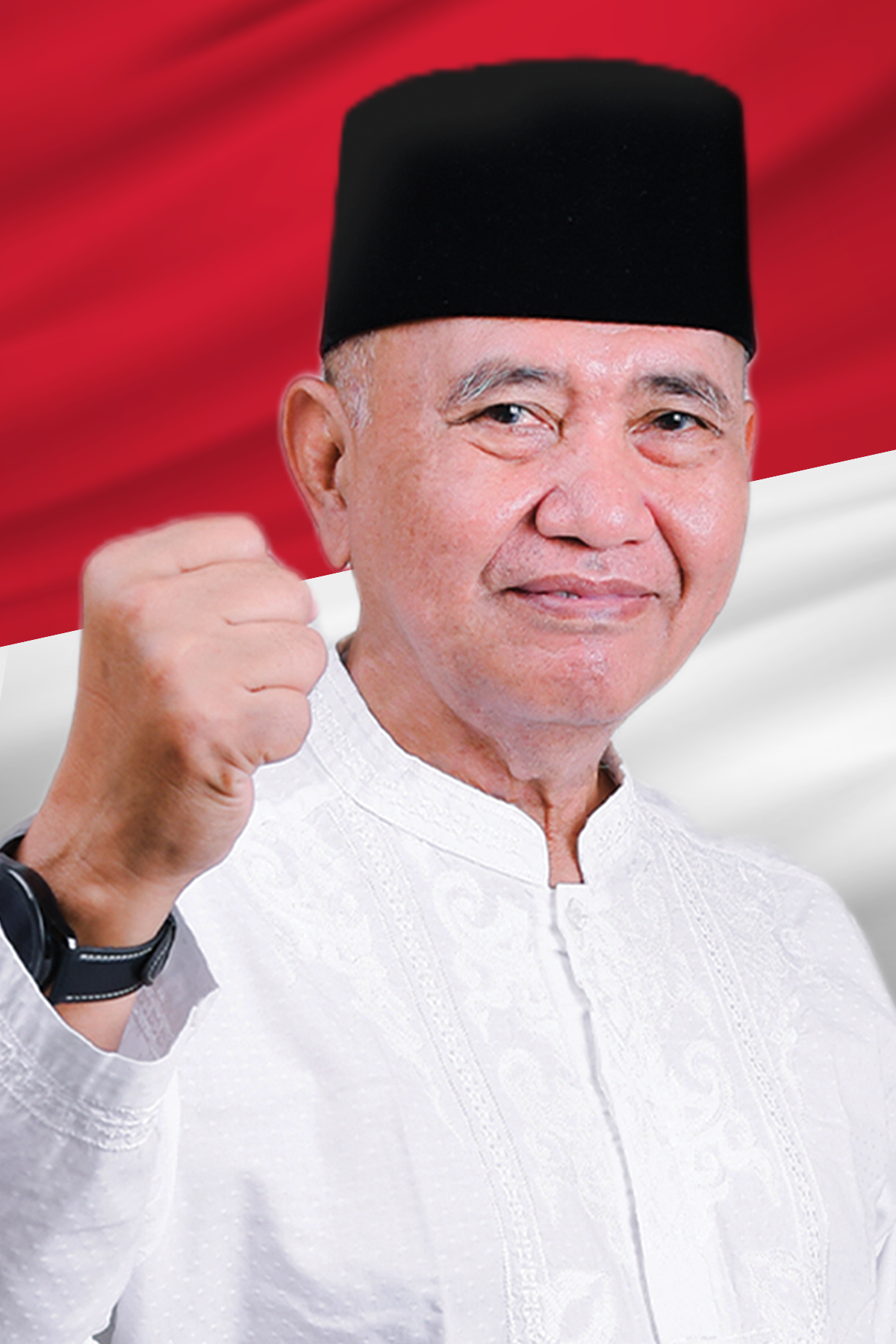
- Electoral portrait, 2023

Chairman of the Corruption Eradication Commission
- In office 21 December 2015 – 20 December 2019
- Deputy: Basaria Panjaitan; Alexander Marwata; La Ode Muhammad Syarif; Saut Situmorang
- Preceded by: Abraham Samad; Taufiequrachman Ruki (acting)
- Succeeded by: Firli Bahuri

Head of the Government Goods/Services Procurement Policy Agency
- In office 10 August 2010 – 3 July 2015
- Preceded by: Roestam Sjarief
- Succeeded by: Agus Prabowo

Personal details
- Born: 1 August 1956 (age 69) Magetan Regency, East Java, Indonesia
- Party: Independent
- Education: Sepuluh Nopember Institute of Technology; Arthur D. Little Management Education Institute

Agus Raharjo is a former Indonesian civil servant and former chairman of the Corruption Eradication Commission. He had previously served as the director of both the National Development Planning Agency and the Public Procurement Policy Agency.

In January 2017, Raharjo led a major anti-bribery operation that involved former Garuda Indonesia President Emirsyah Satar. The operation involved assistance from the Corrupt Practices Investigation Bureau of Singapore and the Serious Fraud Office of the United Kingdom and led to the uncovering of a transnational corruption operation involving Rolls-Royce Holdings and the manufacture of Garuda's aircraft engines.

Government offices
| Preceded by Taufiequrachman Ruki | Chairman of the Corruption Eradication Commission; 2015 to 2019 | Succeeded by Firli Bahuri |
