= Kaligis =

Kaligis is a surname. Notable people with the surname include:

- Lany Kaligis (born 1949), Indonesian professional tennis player
- O. C. Kaligis (born 1942), Indonesian lawyer
- Pete Kaligis (born 1971), American college football coach
