= Bambang Widjojanto =

Indonesian human rights activist

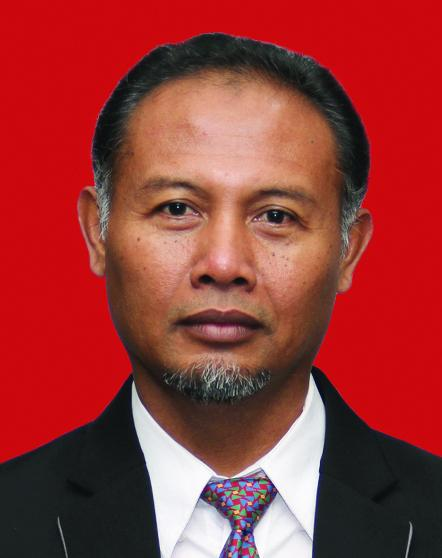
- Portrait as member of KPK
- Born: 18 August 1959 (age 67); Jakarta
- Known for: Human rights work

Bambang Widjojanto (born 18 October 1959) is an Indonesian human rights activist. He is the co-founder of the Indonesian Legal Aid Foundation and a "leading advocate for the rights of the indigenous peoples of West Papua". According to The New York Times, his work for indigenous peoples made him "the target of repeated threats and detentions by the Indonesian government".

== Early life ==
Widjojanto was born in Jakarta on 18 October 1959. He did his undergraduate degree at Jayabaya University, then became a lawyer. By 1986 he was active with legal aid foundations throughout the country. Together with Munir Said Thalib he helped establish the human rights organisation KontraS; Wijojanto was also involved with the establishment of the Consortium for National Law Reform and the Indonesian Corruption Watch.

== Human rights work ==
In 1993, he won the Robert F. Kennedy Human Rights Award. Following the award, the Robert F. Kennedy Center for Justice and Human Rights formed a team of legal experts to assist Bambang in his work.

In 1996, he succeeded Adnan Buyung Nasution as the head of the Legal Aid Institute (LBH, Lembaga Bantuan Hukum), a "central organisation within the pro-democracy movement". Bambang's replacement of Nasution caused a schism within the group, and several activists left to form the rival Indonesian Legal Aid and Human Rights Association. The following year, he defended Muchtar Pakpahan, a labour union leader arrested by the government of President Suharto. The government then attempted to pressure Bambang to testify against his client.

Widjojanto received a master's degree in law from the School of Oriental and African Studies in London. In 2005 he graduated from Padjadjaran University in Bandung with a master's degree in business law; this was followed by a doctorate from the same university in 2009. During this period he was on several special commissions, working with the Supreme Court of Indonesia and the prosecutor general's office.

== Corruption Eradication Commission candidacies ==
In 2010, Widjojanto was one of two finalists to head Indonesia's Corruption Eradication Commission (KPK), along with Muhammad Busyro Muqoddas. Busyro was eventually selected for the position, though President Susilo Bambang Yudhoyono offered Widjojanto a "consolation post" heading the Attorney General's Office Commission to reform the National Police as well as the Attorney General's Office. Widjojanto ran again for the office the following year; he was one of eight candidates for the position. Widjojanto argued that corruption in the country would most easily be eradicated through preemptive efforts, including not allowing the state or its employees to do cash transactions over Rp 10 million.

Though Widjojanto was considered the favourite, the House of Representatives ultimately selected Abraham Samad over both Bambang and the incumbent Busyro. Anti-corruption activists expressed disappointment in the decision, stating that Abraham had been selected to please political parties rather than to combat graft. Widjojanto was still appointed to the commission, however, and made its Deputy Chief.

In 2015, Widjojanto was accused of asking a witness to provide false testimony in 2010.
