= Legal status of gender-affirming healthcare =

The legal status of gender-affirming surgery and gender-affirming hormone therapy varies by jurisdiction, often interacting with other facets of the legal status of transgender people. Key considerations include whether people are allowed to get such surgeries, at what ages they are allowed to if so, and whether surgeries are required in order for a gender transition to be legally recognized.

== Africa ==
=== Democratic Republic of the Congo ===
There are no protective rights or supportive legislations for any type of medical transitional procedures in the Democratic Republic of the Congo.

=== Egypt ===
Sex reassignment surgery is allowed and can be performed in the country after obtaining approval from Al-Azhar Mosque or the Coptic Orthodox Church of Alexandria.

=== Ethiopia ===
Medical procedures for trans people in Ethiopia are illegal. Gender expression out of the 'norm' faces major issues in violence and social stigmatisation.

=== Morocco ===
Casablanca, Morocco, is notable for being the home of Clinique de Parc, Georges Burou's clinic for transgender women. Burou is considered one of the pioneers of gender-affirming surgery. A French gynecologist, Burou created the anteriorly pedicled penile skin flap inversion vaginoplasty, still considered the "gold standard" of skin-lined vaginoplasty. He is credited with having performed over 3000 vaginoplasties in 1973.

=== Nigeria ===
Medical procedures such as hormone replacement and gender-affirming surgeries are illegal in Nigeria. Additionally, it is not possible to change one's name or gender marker in the country of Nigeria, and trans individuals in Nigeria are not legally protected for gender expression.

=== South Africa ===
Trans and gender diverse peoples are protected and acknowledged under South African law, where no sterilisation or other forced procedures are necessary to have legal recognition of a person's gender identity. Gender-affirming surgery is legal and accessible, but not covered by medical aid.

== Asia ==
=== China ===
Gender-affirming surgeries and changing one's legal name and gender are all accessible in the People's Republic of China, but there are rigorous steps to follow to do so. To change one's legal gender, they must show a gender determination certificate as proof of gender-affirming surgery, which cannot be undergone without: psychiatric diagnosis, verification of no prior criminal record, proof that the family has been notified, written agreement from their family and work unit, that they are unmarried and over 20 years old. The psychiatric diagnosis is not given to someone who is not exclusively heterosexual.

=== India ===
Transgender people in India need to undergo a gender-affirming surgery to change their legal gender from male to female or vice-versa. This has been opposed by Indian transgender activists. India also requires proof of having undergone a gender-affirming surgery for changing the gender listed on one's passport. This requirement has been challenged in courts. The government's flagship national health insurance scheme may soon cover gender-affirming surgeries for transgender individuals. India is offering affordable gender-affirming surgeries to a growing number of medical tourists and to the general population.

=== Indonesia ===
In Indonesia, it has been possible to undergo gender-affirming surgery since 1973. Vivian Rubianti was the first transgender woman to have legal gender changes in the country. Indonesia requires gender-affirming surgery and judicial approval for a person to legally change gender.

=== Iran ===
The Iranian government's response to homosexuality is to endorse, and fully pay for, gender-affirming surgery. The leader of Iran's Islamic Revolution, Ayatollah Ruhollah Khomeini, issued a fatwa declaring gender-affirming surgery permissible for "diagnosed transsexuals". Eshaghian's documentary, Be Like Others, chronicles a number of stories of Iranian gay men who feel transitioning is the only way to avoid further persecution, jail, or execution. The head of Iran's main transsexual organization, Maryam Khatoon Molkara, who convinced Khomeini to issue the fatwa on transsexuality, confirmed that some people who undergo operations are gay rather than transsexual. According to the research study of Zara Saeidzadeh who questioned fourteen trans men, nine had completed their medical transition and the remaining five had the intention of completing their medical transition.

=== Japan ===
In October 2023 the Supreme Court unanimously ruled to no longer require sterilization for legal gender change and requested a lower court to review the requirement of gender-affirming surgery.

=== Pakistan ===
In Pakistan, the Council of Islamic Ideology has ruled that gender-affirming surgery contravenes Islamic law as construed by the council.

=== Singapore ===
The first gender-affirming surgery in Singapore was successfully performed on 30 July 1971. Singapore was the first country in Asia to legalize gender-affirming surgeries in 1973. Singapore's first gender-affirming operation on a transmasculine patient took place three years later, and was carried out in three stages between August 1974 and October 1977, as gender-affirming surgeries for transmasculine people are much more complex. Medical tourism for such surgeries are also prevalent in Singapore as local hospitals also accepts foreigners. In 1996, the Singaporean government legalized marriage for transsexuals.

=== Thailand ===
Thailand is the country that performs the most gender-affirming surgeries, followed by Iran.

=== United Arab Emirates ===
Gender-affirming surgery is illegal in the United Arab Emirates.

== Europe ==
=== France ===
Since 2016, France no longer requires gender-affirming surgery as a condition for a gender change on legal documents. In 2017, a case brought earlier by three transgender French people was decided. France was found in violation of the European Convention on Human Rights for requiring the forced sterilization of transgender people seeking to change their gender on legal documents.

=== Malta ===
As late as 2010, transgender people in Malta who have undergone gender-affirming surgery can change their gender on legal documents.

=== Russia ===
Psychiatric evaluation is necessary to receive a diagnosis of "transsexualism" before one can be authorized for hormone therapy or gender-affirming surgeries in Russia. Neither hormone replacement therapy nor gender-affirming surgeries are covered by the Federal Compulsory Medical Insurance Fund.

=== Spain ===
Despite a resolution from the European Parliament in 1989 suggesting advanced rights for all European Union citizens, as of 2002 only Andalusia's public health system covers gender-affirming surgery.

=== Switzerland ===
In 2010, Switzerland's Federal Supreme Court struck down two laws that limited access to gender-affirming surgery. These included requirements of at least 2 years of psychotherapy before health insurance was obligated to cover the cost of gender-affirming surgery and inability to procreate.

=== Ukraine ===
In 2015, the Administrative District Court of Kyiv, Ukraine, ruled that forced sterilization was unlawful and no longer required for legal gender change.

=== United Kingdom ===
The minimum age for gender-affirming surgery varies from 16 in Scotland to 17 in England and 18 in Wales. It is not a requirement for legal gender change.

== North America ==
=== Canada ===
In Canada, all of the provinces and territories cover, through their publicly funded health care program, to various amounts and under varying eligibility requirements, gender-affirming hormone therapy and gender-affirming surgeries. Gender-affirming surgery is not a requirement for legal gender change in Canada.

=== Cuba ===
On 4 June 2008, MINSAP, the Cuban Ministry of Public Health, issued Resolution 126 – which resulted in all aspects of transition related healthcare being covered for Cubans under Cuba's public healthcare system. Cuba was the first country in Latin America to do so. Prior to being approved, it was suggested that the bill would make Cuba the most progressive nation in Latin America on gender issues. The resolution was heavily pushed for by CENESEX a government-funded body dedicated to advocating LGBT rights and sexual diversity.

=== Haiti ===
Gender-affirming surgery does not exist in Haiti.

=== Mexico ===
As of a 2014 law, Mexico City no longer requires gender-affirming surgery for changes of gender on birth certificates, and several states have followed suit.

=== United States ===
Gender-affirming healthcare is not uniformly protected within the United States; accessibility is contingent on respective state legislation and ongoing federal actions, with protections largely dependent on state geography. Some U.S. states treat gender-affirming care as a prerequisite for a legal sex change on official documents such as passports, birth certificates or IDs, and historically (prior to the legalization of same-sex marriage) for marriage licenses.

Whilst there are no states with outright bans on gender affirming care for adults, there are 11 states with outright bans on Medicaid coverage for gender affirming care and 27 states that either ban or restrict best practice medical care for transgender youth. All of the states that limit this kind of healthcare are historically "red" or Republican-led.

As of 2025, the states that ban gender affirming care coverage via Medicaid funding:

- Arizona
- Florida
- Idaho
- Iowa
- Kentucky
- Missouri
- Nebraska
- Ohio
- South Carolina
- Tennessee
- Texas

As of 2025, the states that ban or restrict best practice medical care for transgender youth:

- Alabama
- Arizona
- Arkansas
- Florida
- Georgia
- Idaho
- Indiana
- Iowa
- Kansas
- Kentucky
- Louisiana
- Mississippi
- Missouri
- Montana (ban unenforceable)
- Nebraska
- New Hampshire
- North Carolina
- North Dakota
- Ohio
- Oklahoma
- South Carolina
- South Dakota
- Tennessee
- Texas
- Utah
- Wyoming

While the above states actively restrict gender-affirming healthcare in favor of upholding traditional values, some instances of restrictive legislation, such as the Arkansas House Bill 1570 (2021), have been struck down by U.S. District Courts for violating sections of the U.S. Constitution. Particularly for minors, it is an ongoing back-and-forth dialogue to determine whether Constitutional rights are applicable to children; in August 2025, the U.S. Court of Appeals for the Eighth Circuit reversed the lower court's decision, allowing Arkansas to enforce its ban on gender-affirming care for minors.

On a federal level, gender-affirming healthcare access has been heavily restricted by the Trump administration. In January 2025, an executive order was signed, which banned all gender-affirming care for individuals under the age of 19 in the United States; however, this was temporarily blocked by a federal judge in February 2025.

At the same time, many "blue" or Democrat-controlled states have gone in the opposite direction and enacted laws protecting access to gender affirming care for minors and adults. These laws, often called "shield" laws, often explicitly combine protections for gender-affirming care and abortion and cover a variety of protections, including protecting both providers and patients from being punished, mandating insurance providers to cover the procedures and acting as "sanctuary states" that protect patients traveling to the state from other states that have banned such treatments, among other things. As of July 2025, 18 states and the District of Columbia have enacted "shield" laws. Such protections are considered to uphold constitutional rights for United States citizens, arguing in favor of individual bodily autonomy.

== South America ==
=== Argentina ===
In 2012, Argentina began offering government subsidized total or partial gender-affirming surgeries to all persons 18 years of age or older. Private insurance companies were prohibited from increasing the cost of gender-affirming surgery for their clients. At the same time, the Argentinian government repealed a law that banned gender-affirming surgery without authorization from a judge. It is not required for Argentines to undergo gender-affirming surgery to change gender on legal documents.

=== Brazil ===
Dr. Roberto Farina performed the first male-to-female gender-affirming surgery in Brazil in 1971.

In March 2018, Brazil's Supreme Court unanimously removed medical and judicial criteria for all trans persons to change their names and legal gender. Trans people in Brazil can receive government funded hormone replacement therapy at the age of 16, and gender-affirming surgery at the age of 18. Brazilian civil registry offices recorded 3,165 gender affirming surgeries in 2022.

=== Chile ===
In 2012, a bill was introduced in Chile that stated gender-affirming was no longer a requirement for legal name change and gender recognition. In 2013, Chile's public health plan was required to cover gender-affirming surgery. The cost is subsidized by the government based on a patient's income.

=== Colombia ===
In Colombia, gender marker changes are often granted only when a medical precondition is met, including, but not limited to, psychiatric diagnosis or sterilisation. Gender-affirming surgery is not always necessary for gender change but it is still available under Colombian insurance or if paid out of pocket.

=== Peru ===
Although gender-affirming surgeries are available, trans people in Peru often face barriers to gender-affirming care (e.g., lack of qualified and willing providers, high cost, restrictive gatekeeping in assessment for hormones and surgery), and trans individuals may face malpractice and various forms discrimination.

=== Uruguay ===
The Comprehensive Law for Trans People (La Ley Integral para Personas Trans), which was passed on 19 October 2018, improves the access of surgeries for transgender people in Uruguay. It says that the state will pay for them. For those under 18 wishing to undergo surgery, a request to change their legal name and gender must accompany their registration. For minors who do not have consent from guardians, judicial authorization may be sought in its place.
