= Hotman Paris Hutapea =

Indonesian lawyer (born 1959)

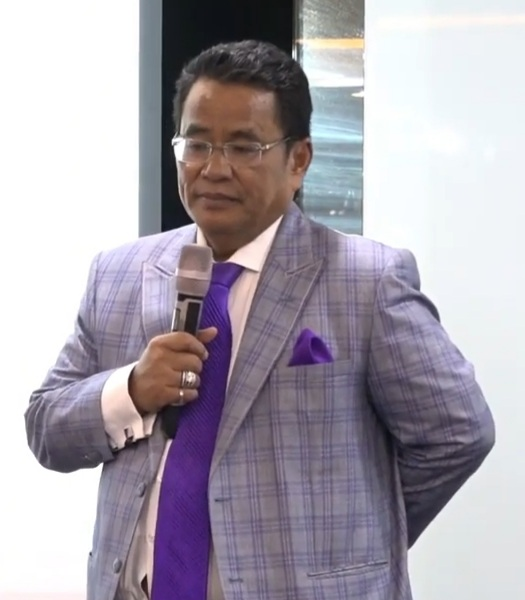
- Born: 20 October 1959 (age 67); Laguboti, Indonesia
- Education: Parahyangan Catholic University; University of Technology Sydney; Gadjah Mada University; Padjadjaran University
- Occupations: Lawyer; presenter; businessman
- Spouse: Agustianne Marbun (m. 1989)
- Partner: Meriam Bellina (unknown–2012)
- Children: 3

Hotman Paris Hutapea (born 20 October 1959) is an Indonesian lawyer, presenter, and businessman. He is known for his flamboyant style, high-profile clients, and luxurious lifestyle.

== Early life ==
Hotman was born on 20 October 1959 in Laguboti, a village in Toba Regency, North Sumatra. He was the sixth of 10 children in a Protestant Batak family. His first name was taken from the Batak word hotma, which means 'steady'. His father ran an intercity bus company called Bintang Utara and often had to live away from home in the North Sumatran capital of Medan. His mother remained at Laguboti and encouraged the children to eat healthily, especially fish and papaya leaves, so they would develop high IQs. Eight of the 10 children became university graduates.

Hotman had planned to study at Indonesia's prestigious Bandung Institute of Technology but failed to pass the entrance exam. He said he knew the answers but did not know how to fill in the answer sheet. Consequently, he applied to study law at Parahyangan Catholic University in Bandung, West Java. He said he had never dreamed of being a lawyer because he used to meet unemployed people with law degrees. Despite his initial lack of enthusiasm, Hotman enjoyed his studies and achieved high scores, becoming the Law Faculty's first student to complete the course in three and a half years. He graduated in 1981.

== Career ==
After Hotman graduated from law school, one of his lecturer's friends advised him to approach the Jakarta law office of O.C. Kaligis. He took a bus to the office at a shop-house complex in the Glodok area and applied for a job. Working for Kaligis, Hotman had his first experience in court. "One time, O.C. Kaligis told me to come to East Jakarta District Court. It was just a regular court session. However, since that first experience of a trial, this leg can’t keep still. It’s always shaking,” he said. Later in 1982, he briefly joined senior lawyer Adnan Buyung Nasution's firm Nasution Lubis Hadiputranto.

Hotman was recruited by Bank Indonesia because of his high academic achievement. He quit after one year, later saying he realized he would never get rich there.

In 1983, Hotman took a job with Makarim & Taira S, a firm specializing in international corporate law. From 1987-1998, he did some work for the firm's Australian affiliate, Freehill, Hollingdale & Page. In 1998, he spoke out against foreign lawyers in Indonesia. He left Makarim & Taira S to set up his firm, Hotman Paris Hutapea & Partners in 1999. His firm focuses on international finance litigation and dispute resolution. He became famous for helping Indonesian conglomerates write off foreign debt, often arguing their original arrangements were illegal under Indonesian law.

== Ethics and reputation ==
Hotman has been described as "a behind-the-scenes operator" in handling cases. He has reportedly admitted to meeting judges privately to get the result he wants and has given them money as thank-you gifts. Commenting on alleged judicial corruption, he has said: "I live in Indonesian courts every day, it's unethical if I say something bad about my court, although you know the answer. Everything is possible."

In a 2010 interview, Hotman told The New York Times, “If I say I’m a clean lawyer, I’ll be a hypocrite, that’s all I can say. And if other lawyers say they are clean, they will go to jail, they’ll go to hell.”

In 2014, Hong Kong-based Capital Profile issued a special report titled The Best of Hotman Paris, listing eight of his "most illustrious clients and memorable cases". The report noted:

No one embodies the hazards of investing in Indonesia better than Hotman Paris Hutapea, the flamboyant corporate lawyer at the center of the country’s most notorious bankruptcy cases. Loved by local tycoons, feared by foreign creditors and respected by lawyers who marvel at his legal sleight of hand even as they question his methods, Hotman has parlayed his courtroom success and colorful persona into national celebrity.

a Hotman responded by saying he considered the report a compliment and he was happy to be praised.

== Notable cases ==
=== Mayora versus Bankers Trust ===
Hotman represented consumer goods company Mayora Indah when it sued Bankers Trust International (BTI) at South Jakarta District Court in October 1998. Mayora Indah claimed BTI had sold its derivative contracts without providing adequate notice of the risk. BTI's lawyer tried without success to have the presiding judge replaced. BTI had initially taken the case to the London Court of International Arbitration (LCIA), which ruled in favor of BTI, but the South Jakarta District Court subsequently ruled in favor of Mayora. BTI appealed and the Supreme Court upheld the ruling in 2000 and again in 2003, leaving BTI with no further legal recourse.

=== Asia Pulp & Paper debt default ===
Hotman defended the Widjaja family's Asia Pulp & Paper (APP) from its foreign creditors after the conglomerate defaulted on $13.9 billion of debt in March 2001. Creditors filed a claim in New York for the repayment of a $500 million bond issued by APP subsidiary Indah Kiat. The company responded in November 2003 by suing bondholders, underwriters, and the trustee in Indonesia, seeking damages and demanding the bond be declared invalid. Hotman claimed the bond's commonly used issuing structure was illegal in Indonesia and therefore unenforceable. A local court ruled in APP's favor. The Supreme Court upheld the ruling in 2006 but then reversed its ruling in 2008. Hotman in 2004 said the creditors who bought APP's debt at a discount were “greedy” to demand equal repayment. “They came after us with a pistol, so I’ve wiped them out with nuclear weapons,” he said.

=== Election ink procurement ===
Hotman in 2005 represented former General Elections Commission (KPU) member Rusadi Kantaprawira, who was accused of corruption and enriching himself by procuring ink for Indonesia's 2004 general election. Hotman's defense was pro bono because Rusadi was one of his former lecturers. Rusadi was sentenced to four years in jail, although allegations of kickbacks were not proven at his trial. Hotman argued there was no corruption because Rusadi set an ink price based on average price quotations offered by the companies submitting tenders, rather than choosing the cheapest offer because of concerns about quality and viability. The verdict led to complaints that Indonesia's Anti Corruption Court was being too flexible in its definition of corruption to maintain its 100% conviction rate.

=== Schapelle Corby ===
Hotman was part of Schapelle Corby's legal team until late January 2006 when the Indonesian Supreme Court reinstated her 20-year sentence for drug trafficking. Hotman had represented Corby pro bono and said he resigned to make money to buy a Ferrari.

Hotman appeared on the Australian current affairs television show The 7.30 Report on ABC in July 2005 defending his integrity, stating: "So I'm not Mr Clean, but for this case temporarily I am clean." and went on to say "There is no lawyer in the world that is clean. All lawyers are usually hypocrites. To help I try to reduce my hypocrisy a little bit. If you keep saying that an Australian lawyer or an American lawyer are all clean, that's total bullshit."

=== JIS alleged abuse ===
In 2014, two teachers at Jakarta International School (later renamed Jakarta Intercultural School), Canadian Neil Bantleman and Indonesian Ferdinant Tjiong, were accused of sexually abusing three kindergarten boys. Representing the teachers pro bono, Hotman said there was no solid evidence against them. In April 2015, South Jakarta District Court sentenced the two to 10 years in jail. Hotman appealed and the two were acquitted by Jakarta High Court in August 2015. In February 2016, the Supreme Court overturned the acquittal and increased the sentence to 11 years. Hotman's children attended JIS.

=== Jennifer Dunn ===
Hotman has represented soap opera actress Jennifer Dunn. In 2014, she was questioned by the Corruption Eradication Commission (KPK) over a Toyota Vellfire worth Rp 888 million (US$75,480) she received from corruption felon Tubagus Chaeri "Wawan" Wardana, the younger brother of former Banten governor Ratu Atut Chosiyah. Hotman denied that the car was a payment for sex. "It was purely for business. Wawan also gave her a credit card, which has been blocked by the KPK. The gifts were to persuade her to join Wawan's production house," he said. In 2017, Hotman revealed Dunn had undergone a facelift in Singapore during the time she was close to Wawan.

=== Razman Arif Nasution ===
This case began when Hotman was reported by his former personal assistant, Iqlima Kim regarding alleged harassment in 2022. In the report, Iqlima was appointed by Razman as a lawyer. It is known that the defamation case trial is a follow-up to Hotman's report against Razman which was registered in May 2022. In 2025, the defamation case trial held at the North Jakarta District Court on Thursday 6 February was chaotic. The defendant Razman, who was present at that time, lost his emotions and approached Hotman who was present as a witness. The chaos in the trial of this case started when Razman, who had the status of a defendant, went berserk and approached Hotman who was sitting in the witness chair. Hotman asked the police to immediately take legal action against Razman and the legal team who considered that this attitude could not be tolerated because it had insulted the court.

== Personal case ==
In March 2012, actress Meriam Bellina reported Hotman to Jakarta Police for alleged physical abuse and harassing her through text messages and phone calls. Hotman responded: "What she reported is an incident that happened three years ago. We have been very close over the past three years. We went on holiday together. We have no problems." In early April 2012, police were still collecting evidence such as medical records since 2009, which based on Meriam Bellina's report stated she had a broken nose, neck problems, and bleeding from her right ear. On 28 April 2012, the two parties signed a nine-point agreement, including Hotman's apology for his attitude and his admission they never married in Las Vegas. Meriam agreed to withdraw the police report she filed and Hotman accepted Meriam's decision to end their relationship.

== Personal life ==
Hotman is married to Agustianne Marbun and they have three children. Hotman is often seen in the company of female celebrities and has admitted to carrying on an affair with an actress for six years. He says his wife and children are his top priority "but I am just an ordinary human who likes to cheat, depending on the temptation".

He is known for buying a new foreign luxury car each year. Local media reports say he has purchased Lamborghini, Ferrari, Chrysler, Bentley and Hummer H2 vehicles. In 2012, he gave his daughter a Bentley Mulsanne worth about Rp. 9 billion for her 17th birthday. "Everyone wants to own a luxury car. I've worked hard for 30 years as a lawyer, yes I have the right to enjoy life," he said in 2018. He is reported to have separate chauffeurs for each car.

On 5 October 2014, Hotman was involved in a fatal car accident on Wiyoto Wiyono toll road in Jakarta. Police said Hotman's green Lamborghini Gallardo LP 570-4 Spyder Performante crashed into a box-truck that had just suffered a burst tire. The truck rolled, killing the driver. Police said the accident was unavoidable because of the burst tire. Hotman said a bus swerved to avoid the truck and hit his car.

In 2017, Hotman said he owns some assets including 12 hotels and luxury villas, and he intends to expand his portfolio to 50 luxury properties. Most of his villas are in Bali. One of them can be rented for Rp 23 million per night. In Jakarta, he owns properties in the Central Park, Sudirman Park and Thamrin Residence developments, as well as a block of shop-houses in Kelapa Gading. "All the property assets that I own are from my toil and sweat," he said. Most of his assets' owning rights are under his wife and his children. Hotman's current net worth is said to be Rp. 4,5 Trillion rupiah (~$302 million USD) through diverse business ventures and hefty commission as being one of the prominent lawyers in the nation.

=== Education ===
- Doctorate, Law Faculty, Padjajaran University, 2011
- Master of Law, Gajah Mada University, Yogyakarta, 2006
- Master of Law, University of Technology, Sydney, 1990
- Law degree, Parahyangan Catholic University, Bandung, 1981
- Universitas Indonesia

=== Work experience ===
- Member of Capital Market Legal Consultants Association (HKHPM)
- Founder of Hotman Paris Hutapea & Partners (1999–present)
- Freehill, Hollingdale & Page, Sydney (affiliated with Makarim and Taira S) (1987–1998)
- Makarim & Taira S International Law Firm, Jakarta (1983–1999)
- Nasution Lubis Hadiputranto Law Firm, Jakarta (1982)
- OC Kaligis & Associates Law Firm, Jakarta (1982)
