= Johan Budi =

Indonesian PDIP politician and former head of the Corruption Eradication Commission

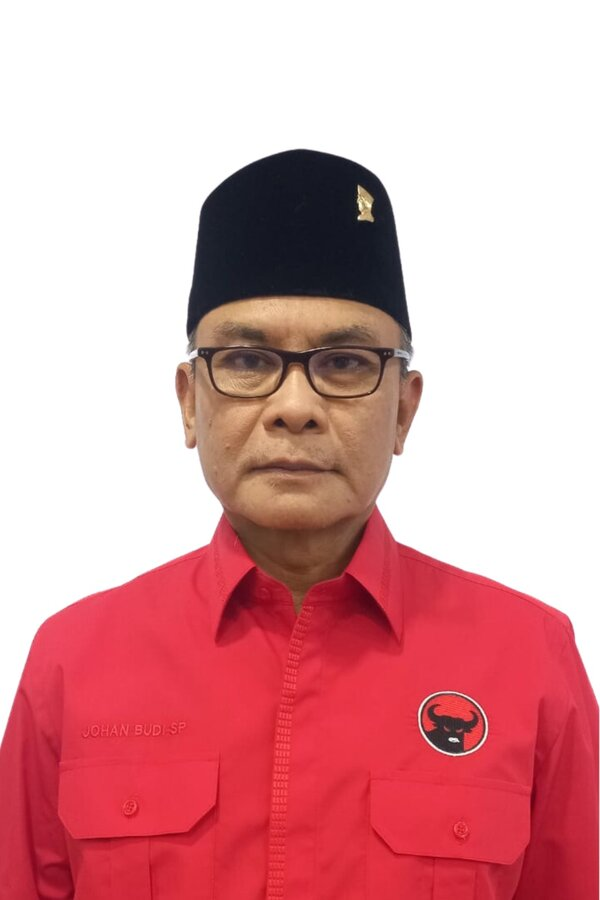

Member of the People's Representative Council of the Republic of Indonesia
- In office 1 October 2019 – 1 October 2024
- Vote acquisition: 76.395 (2019)
- Constituency: East Java VII

Spokesperson to the President
- In office 12 January 2016 – 13 September 2019
- President: Joko Widodo
- Preceded by: Teuku Faizasyah (International Affairs); Julian Aldrin Pasha (Home Affairs)
- Succeeded by: Fadjroel Rachman

Acting Third Vice Chairman of the Corruption Eradication Commission
- In office 20 February 2015 – 20 December 2015 Serving with Zulkarnain, Indriyanto Seno Adji & Adnan Pandu Praja
- President: Joko Widodo
- Chairman: Taufiequrachman Ruki
- Preceded by: Bambang Widjojanto
- Succeeded by: Alexander Marwata

Personal details
- Born: Johan Budi Sapto Pribowo; January 29, 1966 (age 60) Mojokerto, East Java, Indonesia
- Party: Indonesian Democratic Party of Struggle (PDIP) (since 2018)
- Spouse: Siska Amelia
- Education: University of Indonesia
- Occupation: Journalist, Spokesman

Johan Budi Sapto Pribowo (born 29 January 1966) is an Indonesian spokesman and journalist. Johan Budi is the Special Assistant to President Joko Widodo on Communication and Media, a.k.a. the Presidential Spokesman. In 2015, he was the Acting Chief of the Corruption Eradication Commission (KPK) to fill in for Abraham Samad and Bambang Widjojanto who were being suspended by President Joko Widodo.

In July 2018, he became a cadre of Indonesian Democratic Party of Struggle.

== Early life ==
He was born in the Mojokerto.

== Career ==
Between 2006 and 2014 Johan Budi was the spokesman for the Corruption Eradication Commission (KPK). Previously he served as KPK's Director of Education and Community Services.

In 2018, Johan was elected as a member of the People's Legislative Assembly for the 2019-2024 period in the 2019 Legislative General Elections for the East Java VII electoral district from the PDI-P.
