= Rizal Mallarangeng =

Indonesian politician and author

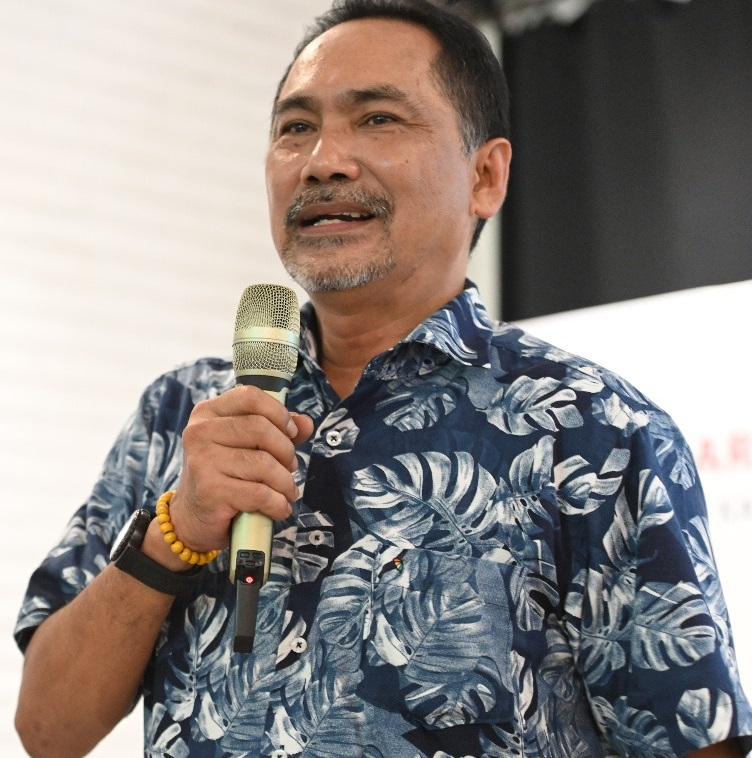

Personal details
- Born: October 29, 1964 (age 61) Makassar, Indonesia
- Party: Golkar Party
- Spouse: Dewi Tjakrawati
- Relations: Andi Mallarangeng (brother)
- Children: Guntur; Surya
- Education: Gadjah Mada University; Ohio State University

Rizal Mallarangeng (born October 29, 1964) is an Indonesian politician. He served as a senior advisor to Indonesia's Coordinating Economic Minister (2004-2005) and Coordinating Welfare Minister (2005-2008) Aburizal Bakrie. He also served as a member of Golkar Party's Leadership Committee under Aburizal Bakrie and Airlangga Hartarto.

He was born in Makassar, South Sulawesi. After obtaining his doctorate degree in Ohio State University, he returned to Indonesia and started his career as a political researcher, speechwriter to the Indonesian president Megawati Soekarnoputri, and talkshow host for Metro TV. In 2008, he declared that he would run for the 2009 Indonesian presidential election; however, he had to withdraw from the race due to his low electability. Subsequently, he joined the Golkar Party and was appointed as the Head of Policy Research under Aburizal Bakrie. Later he was appointed as the acting Chairman of Golkar Party’s DKI Jakarta Chapter and the Coordinator of Special Fundraising under Airlangga Hartarto.

Rizal wrote several books and articles on politics and economy. He is the founder of Freedom Institute, a think tank for young intellectuals and writers.

== Early life ==
Mallarangeng was born in Makassar, South Sulawesi, on October 29, 1964. His father was Andi Mallarangeng, former mayor of Parepare from 1969 to 1972. He is the second child in a family of five. His brother is Andi Alfian Mallarangeng who would later serve as the Minister of Youth and Sports under President Susilo Bambang Yudhoyono. He studied at SMAN Ragunan, a high school for athletes. He obtained his political science degree in Gadjah Mada University, and subsequently he was awarded a Fulbright scholarship to study at Ohio State University, where he obtained his master's and doctorate degrees.

== Political career ==
Mallarangeng returned to Indonesia in 2001 and became a researcher in Centre for Strategic and International Studies (CSIS). At the same time, he became a talkshow host in Metro TV. After working in CSIS for two months, he founded Freedom Institute, a think tank for young intellectuals and writers, where he serves as the executive director. He also became a speechwriter for the Indonesian President Megawati Soekarnoputri. In 2002, Mallarangeng launched a book titled "Mendobrak Sentralisme Ekonomi: Indonesia 1986-1992" (Breaking Economic Centralism: Indonesia 1986-1992), which was adapted from his PhD dissertation that was supervised by Professor William Liddle. This book covers the process of economic liberalization in Indonesia from 1986-1992 under the rule of Soeharto, and this book also explains the growth of “liberal epistemic community”, which is a network of individuals that are united by a common belief in the merit of a certain view irrespective of their origin or social status.

After Susilo Bambang Yudhoyono won the 2004 Indonesian presidential election, Mallarangeng became a senior advisor to Indonesia's Coordinating Economic Minister (2004-2005) and Coordinating Welfare Minister (2005-2008) Aburizal Bakrie. He once also served as the Vice Chair of the Indonesian Delegation for the 2007 United Nations Climate Change Conference in Bali. In February 2008, Rizal founded a political consulting firm named Fox Indonesia. In July 2009, Mallarangeng declared that he would run for the 2009 Indonesian presidential election, despite the fact that his brother, Andi Mallarangeng, was a member of the Democratic Party who supported the incumbent Susilo Bambang Yudhoyono. Although he was not supported by any party, Mallarangeng stated that he was willing to accept a candidacy offer from Golkar Party or even the Indonesian Democratic Party of Struggle. With his icon "RM09", he launched his campaign through television ads. At this time, he was known for his statement, "If there is a will, there is a way". However, although he had campaigned for three months from July to September 2008, his electability was still low. He claimed that during the campaign, his campaign team managed to increase his popularity to 35% compared to the previous rate, 12-14%, and yet he believed that this was insufficient since 90% was required to win the race. As a result, on November 19, 2008, he declared that he would withdraw from the race. Subsequently, he decided to support the candidacy of Susilo Bambang Yudhoyono and he was then appointed as the spokesperson for the campaign.

After the election, Mallarangeng joined the Golkar Party, and on October 8, 2009, he was appointed as the Head of Policy Studies under the leadership of Aburizal Bakrie. This appointment was questioned due to the fact that he was close to the Democratic Party and was not a member who started from the bottom. Years later, after Airlangga Hartarto was elected as the chairman of Golkar Party, Mallarangeng was appointed as the Vice Coordinator for Special Fundraising on January 22, 2018. Subsequently, on September 6, 2018, Rizal became the acting Chairman of Golkar Party’s DKI Jakarta Chapter. On March 19, 2019, he became the Coordinator for Special Fundraising of the Golkar Party. He was also appointed as the National Coordinator of Gojo (Golkar Jokowi) Volunteers to support the candidacy of Joko Widodo for the 2019 Indonesian presidential election.

== Private life ==
Mallarangeng married Dewi Tjakrawati who was his fellow student in Gadjah Mada University. They have two sons, Guntur and Surya.

== Books ==
- Mendobrak Sentralisme Ekonomi: Indonesia 1986-1992 (2002)
- Dari Langit: Kumpulan Esai tentang Manusia, Masyarakat, dan Kekuasaan (2008)
- Pers Orde Baru: Tinjauan Isi Kompas dan Suara Karya (2010)
- Dari Jokowi ke Harari: Kumpulan Esai tentang Politik, Ilmu, dan Masa Depan (2019)

== Bibliography ==
- Mallarangeng, Rizal (2008). Dari Langit: Kumpulan Esai tentang Manusia, Masyarakat, dan Kekuasaan. Jakarta: Kepustakaan Populer Gramedia. ISBN 9789799101426.
- Sadli, Mohammad (2002). Bila Kapal Punya Dua Nakhoda: Esai-esai Ekonomi-Politik Masa Transisi. Jakarta: AlvaBet. ISBN 9793064013.
