= Teuku Faizasyah =

Indonesian diplomat (born 1964)

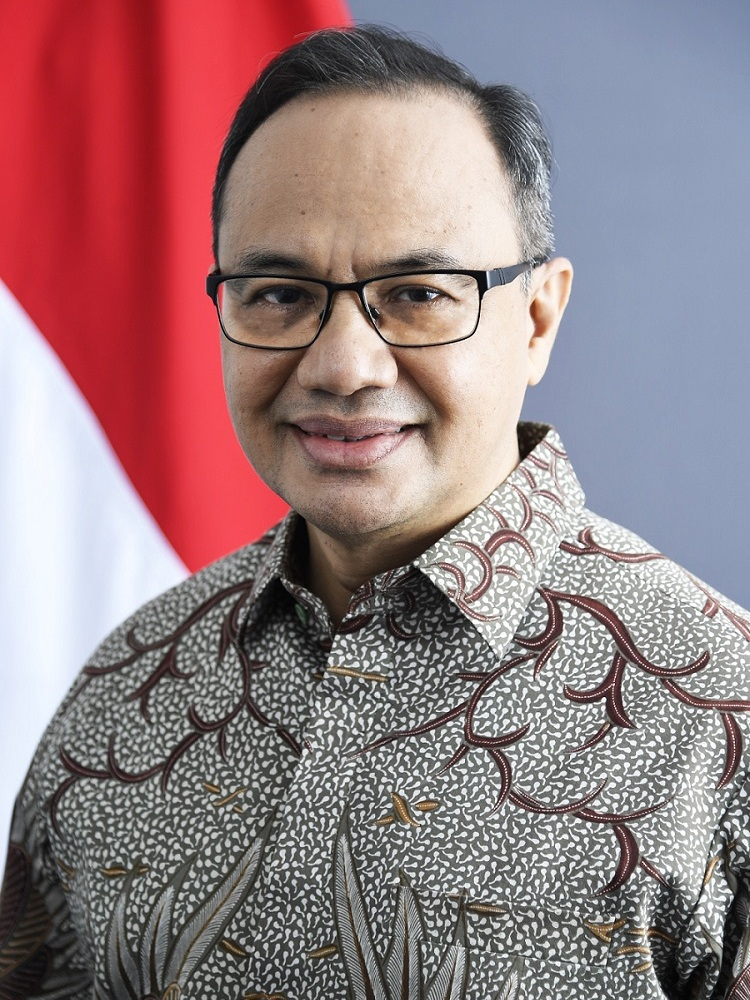

Ambassador of Indonesia to Norway and Iceland
- Incumbent
- Assumed office 26 June 2023
- President: Joko Widodo; Prabowo Subianto
- Preceded by: Todung Mulya Lubis

Director General for Information and Public Diplomacy
- In office 19 June 2020 – 6 October 2023
- Preceded by: Cecep Herawan
- Succeeded by: Siti Nugraha Mauludiah

Ambassador of Indonesia to Canada
- In office 15 October 2014 – 12 January 2018
- President: Joko Widodo
- Preceded by: Dienne Hardianti Moehario
- Succeeded by: Abdul Kadir Jailani

Spokesperson to the President for International Relations
- In office 6 September 2010 – 15 October 2014 Serving with Julian Aldrin Pasha
- President: Susilo Bambang Yudhoyono
- Preceded by: Dino Patti Djalal
- Succeeded by: Johan Budi (2016)

Chief of Staff to the Foreign Minister
- In office 14 April 2008 – August 2010
- Preceded by: Kristiarto Legowo
- Succeeded by: Michael Tene

Personal details
- Born: 23 October 1964 (age 61) Bandung, West Java, Indonesia
- Spouse: Andis Erawan
- Education: Padjadjaran University; Birmingham University; University of Waikato

Teuku Faizasyah (born 23 October 1964) is an Indonesian diplomat who is currently serving as Indonesia's ambassador to Norway and Iceland since 2023. Prior to his appointment, he was ambassador to Canada from 2014 to 2018 and as director-general of information and public diplomacy from 2020 to 2023.

== Early life and education ==
Faizasyah was born on 23 October 1964 in Bandung in a family of four. Faizasyah's parents were both of Acehnese descent, with his father coming from Tringgadeng, Pidie Jaya, and his mother from Lhoknga, Aceh Besar. His parents settled in Bandung in the late 1960s, where he was born and raised. Although his daily life involved using the Sundanese language, he learned Acehnese from his grandmother when returning to Aceh for holiday in the 1980s, which cemented his ancestral identity.

Teuku Faizasyah's interest in diplomacy began during his high school years. His passion led him to pursue a bachelor's degree in international relations from Padjadjaran University, which he completed in 1991. During his foreign service career, Faizasyah completed his master's degree in international studies from the University of Birmingham in England in 1993 and his doctorate in political science and public policy from the University of Waikato in 2003. He received the New Zealand's Overseas Development Assistance Scholarship for his latter's studies. His thesis, which discussed Suharto's informal diplomacy, was supervised by Alan Simpson and Mark Rolls.

== Diplomatic career ==
Faizasyah began his career in the foreign ministry, serving within the North America subdirectorate until 1992. Upon receiving his master's degree, he was appointed as the chief of ASEAN tourism development subsection within the foreign department's ASEAN economic bureau, serving until 1995. He was then assigned to the economic section of the embassy in Washington with the rank of third secretary, serving until 1998. He then returned to Jakarta as chief of economic and socio-cultural data subsection in the foreign department's research and development agency for two years, until he left for his doctorate studies.

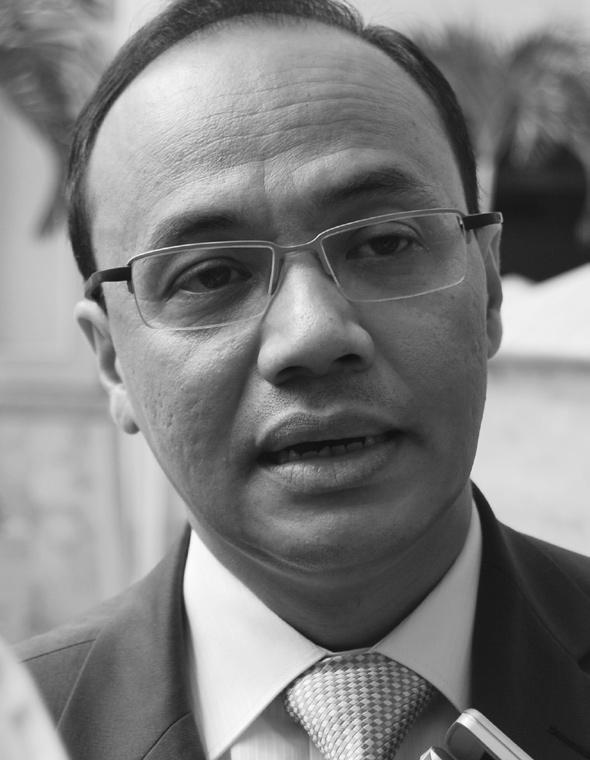
Teuku Faizasyah as the foreign ministry's spokesperson in 2009.

Upon receiving his doctorate, Faizasyah returned to Indonesia and held a double role within the government. Within the presidential office, he was the chief secretary for presidential envoys and advisors until 2004, and within the foreign ministry he was the chief of socio-political issues section within the foreign minister's chief of staff office until 2005. From Jakarta, he was posted to the embassy in Pretoria as chief of socio-cultural affairs section, in which he organized a seminar on African political exiles. He was then transferred to head the embassy's political section. Upon completing his stint in Pretoria, on 14 April 2008 Faizasyah was named as the acting minister's chief of staff, a position that also entailed duties as the foreign department's spokesperson. His appointment as chief of staff was made permanent on 11 September 2008. During his tenure with foreign minister Hassan Wirajuda, Faizasyah conducted several trips to Aceh.

On 25 August 2010, Faizasyah made his maiden appearance as the presidential spokesperson for international relations, replacing Dino Patti Djalal who had been installed as ambassador to the United States a month earlier. At his maiden appearance, he spoke at a press conference following President Susilo Bambang Yudhoyono's meeting with the leader of the CDU/CSU group in the Bundestag, Volker Kauder. Dino was also present at the conference but did not speak. Although he had already been unofficially appointed as the spokesperson, he refused such credentials, opting to be referred as an "intern" for Dino. After two months of unofficial appointment, on 6 September he officially became the president's spokesperson for international relations through a presidential decree. Teuku's official title of the president's special staff for international relations also entailed duties as the president's foreign policy advisor. During his career, he accompanied president Susilo for state visits and international conferences.

Faizasyah was named as the ambassador of Indonesia to Canada and ICAO on 15 October 2014, five days before Susilo's term as president ended. He presented his credentials to Governor General of Canada David Johnston on 18 November and Secretary General of the ICAO Raymond Benjamin on 5 December.

Upon returning to Indonesia after his ambassadorial term, in early 2019 Faizasyah became the minister's expert staff for political, security, and legal affairs, and concurrently as the acting spokesperson of the foreign ministry. Several months later, he was designated as the acting director general for America and Europe. After Cecep Herawan's appointment as the foreign ministry's secretary general on 19 June 2020, Faizasyah provisionally assumed his duties as acting director general for information and public diplomacy before permanently assuming the position on 27 October 2020. He was re-appointed to the position on 18 August 2021 after reorganization within the ministry's structure.

In December 2022, Faizasyah was nominated as ambassador to Norway, with concurrent accreditation to Iceland, by President Joko Widodo. After passing an assessment by the house of representative's first commission the next month, he officially assumed office on 26 June 2023. Shortly after his inauguration, Faizasyah pledged to strengthen bilateral economic ties, especially in areas with no major political friction. He presented his credentials to the King of Norway Harald V on 21 September and to President of Iceland Guðni Th. Jóhannesson on 17 October.

== Personal life ==
Faizasyah is married to Andis Erawan and has three children. He has been described as a soft-spoken and calm individual.
