= Julian Aldrin Pasha =

Indonesian politician

Spokesperson to President for the Home Affairs
- In office 22 October 2009 – 20 October 2014 Serving with Dino Patti Djalal and Teuku Faizasyah
- President: Susilo Bambang Yudhoyono
- Preceded by: Andi Alfian Mallarangeng
- Succeeded by: Johan Budi (2016)

Personal details
- Born: 22 July 1969 (age 57) Bandar Lampung, Lampung, Indonesia
- Education: University of Indonesia; Hosei University

Julian Aldrin Pasha (born 22 July 1969 in Bandar Lampung, Lampung) is an Indonesian politician. Julian Pasha was the Presidential Spokesman of Indonesia replacing Andi Mallarangeng during the reign of President Susilo Bambang Yudhoyono in Second United Indonesia Cabinet. He was previously a guest lecturer at several universities in Tokyo. He was also Head of Political Science Department Faculty of Social and Political Sciences of the University of Indonesia.
