= Antasari Azhar =

Indonesian politician (1953–2025)

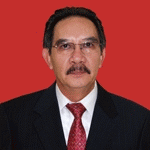

2nd Chairman of the Corruption Eradication Commission
- In office 18 December 2007 – 11 October 2009
- President: Susilo Bambang Yudhoyono
- Lieutenant: Bibit Samad Rianto; Chandra M. Hamzah; Mochammad Jasin; Haryono Umar
- Preceded by: Taufiequrachman Ruki
- Succeeded by: Tumpak Hatorangan Panggabean (Acting)

Personal details
- Born: 18 March 1953 Pangkalpinang, Bangka Belitung Islands, Indonesia
- Died: 8 November 2025 (aged 72) South Tangerang, Indonesia
- Spouse: Ida Laksmiwati
- Children: Ajeng Oftarika Antasari Putri
- Education: Sriwijaya University
- Profession: Prosecutor

Antasari Azhar (18 March 1953 – 8 November 2025) was an Indonesian politician who was the chairman of the Corruption Eradication Commission of Indonesia. He was fired from his position on 11 October 2009 by President Susilo Bambang Yudhoyono after being convicted of murder. He was granted clemency in early 2017 by President Joko Widodo and released from prison.

== Early life and education ==
Antasari Azhar was the fourth of 15 children born to Azhar Hamid and Asnani. His father was the head of a tax office in Belitung.

Antasari grew up on Belitung Island. After finishing his elementary school education in 1965, he attended junior and senior high school in Jakarta, graduating in 1971. He then studied at Sriwijaya University, majoring in state management and graduated in 1981. At university, Antasari was the Senate Chairman and Head of the Student Community. He was involved in a demonstration in 1978. Later, as a state prosecutor, he took several courses including Commercial Law at New South Wales University in Sydney, and Environmental Law Investigation at the Environment Protection Authority in Melbourne.

== Career ==
Antasari started his career at the Justice Ministry (1981–1985). His plan to become a diplomat changed after he was accepted to become a prosecutor at the Central Jakarta State Prosecutor's Office, where he served from 1985 to 1989. Next he was appointed a prosecutor at Tanjung Pinang State Prosecutor's Office (1989–1992). He then served as Head of the Corruption Investigation Section at the Lampung High State Prosecutor's Office (1992–1994) and later as Head of Special Crimes at the West Jakarta State Prosecutor's Office (1994–1996). Next, he became Baturaja State Prosecutor (1997–1999).

In 1999, Antasari joined the High State Prosecutor's Office, serving as chief investigator of the Special Crimes Sub-directorate (1999–2000). He was subsequently Head of Mass Media Communication (2000) at the High State Prosecutor's Office.

It was as Chief of the South Jakarta State Prosecutor's Office (2000–2007) that he first gained widespread attention in the mass media. In 2000, the Supreme Court sentenced former president Suharto's youngest son Tommy to 18 months in jail for corruption. It was Antasari's job to take Tommy to jail, but instead the former playboy was allowed to go on the run, resulting in speculation that Antasari had been paid off, although this was never proven.

== Chairman of Corruption Eradication Commission ==
The controversy over Tommy Suharto's case did not stop Antasari from being elected Chairman of the Indonesian Corruption Eradication Commission (KPK) in December 2007, defeating Chandra M. Hamzah by 41 votes in the election held by the 49 members of the Indonesian House of Representatives' (DPR) Commission III on legal affairs. His election victory was attributed to strong lobbying by the Golkar Party and the Indonesian Democratic Party of Struggle (PDIP).

== Murder case ==
On 4 May 2009, Antasari was arrested on suspicion of ordering the murder of Nasrudin Zulkarnaen, a prominent businessman who headed a state-owned pharmaceuticals firm, PT Rajawali Putra Banjaran. It was alleged that Nasrudin had been blackmailing Antasari over the latter's extramarital affair with a female golf caddy.

Also arrested in connection with the murder were tycoon Sigid Haryo Wibisono, the former head of Golkar's Central Java chapter and chief commissioner of the Harian Merdeka newspaper; and Senior Commissioner Williardi Wizar, the former South Jakarta Police chief. Six men involved in planning and conducting the assassination were also detained. Williardi was accused of hiring the hit squad and Sigid was accused of paying for the hit.

Antasari denied any wrongdoing, claiming he was faithful to his wife, Ida Laksmiwati, of 26 years. He was suspended as KPK chairman by President Susilo Bambang Yudhoyono.

On 11 February 2010, Antasari was convicted of ordering the murder and sentenced to 18 years' imprisonment. He appealed the verdict unsuccessfully.

Antasari was granted clemency on 26 January 2017 by President Joko Widodo on to humanitarian grounds.

== Death ==
Antasari died on 8 November 2025, at the age of 72.
