= Vivian Rubianti =

Indonesian first legally recognised trans person

Vivian Rubiyanti Iskandar
- Vivian at court.
- Born: Khan Kok Hian; January 1, 1944 (age 82)
- Known for: First trans person in Indonesia to obtain legal recognition of gender
- Notable work: Akulah Vivian - film (1977)

Vivian Rubiyanti Iskandar (born January 1, 1944; middle name also spelled Rubianti and Rubianty) is the first trans person legally recognised by the Indonesian courts as their true gender.

== Early life ==
Born on January 1, 1944, to Khan Kiam Lee and Auw Roontji Nio, Vivian was a Chinese citizen at birth. Owing to the Sino-Indonesian Dual Nationality Treaty, she relinquished her Chinese nationality and her birth name "Khan Kok Hian" in favour of an Indonesian identity, adopting the name "Iwan Robyanto Iskandar". Vivian owned a beauty salon in Kebayoran Baru called Robby Remaja ("Robby the Revitaliser"), and a number of her apprentices would go on to become household names in the Indonesian beauty industry (e.g. Rudy Hadisuwarno).

In 1971, she played a thug in the film Jang Djatuh Dikaki Lelaki (Fallen at a Man's Feet).

== Transitioning ==
In January 1973, Vivian underwent gender confirmation surgery at Kandang Kerbau Hospital in Singapore. Afterward, she returned to Indonesia and petitioned the West Jakarta District Court for a legal change of gender. There had previously been no Indonesian law concerning legal changes of gender. Her attorney, Adnan Buyung Nasution of Jakarta Legal Aid, argued that the absence of such a law did not restrict her right to seek this redress.

A notable expert witness in her case was noted theologian and reverend Eka Darmaputera, who argued that "according to the Christian faith, God [wanted] human beings to be happy in their [lives]"; in pursuance of that, Darmaputera threw the support of the Christian church behind her. The Islamic scholar Buya Hamka also testified in support of Vivian, saying that "[her desire to transition] does not run contrary to Allah's law, but in keeping with the teachings of Islam, which hold the advances of humankind's science ought to be used to improve the lives of human beings".

As a result, the presiding judge granted Vivian's petition, and as of November 11, 1973, she was legally recognised by the Indonesian state as a female named Vivian Rubiyanti Iskandar.

== Later life ==
At some point in the decade, she would go on to own the Vivian shoe boutique at the Hias Rias Cikini shopping centre. In 1975, she married Felix Rumayar in Jakarta, solemnised under the rites of the Catholic Church. Her wedding was attended by several notables, including then-Governor of Jakarta Ali Sadikin. Vivian gave up on her salon - taking up employment as a sales girl for Viva Cosmetics in Jogjakarta. Her marriage to Rumayar eventually failed, and she elected to immigrate to Australia. A movie based on her life, Akulah Vivian (I Am Vivian), was released in 1977, starring herself. Ben Murtagh, in his analysis of the movie, argues that Vivian did not see herself as part of the Waria community, instead understanding herself to firmly fall on one side of a male-female gender binary.

Vivian's case has become a landmark one in Indonesian jurisprudence, being cited in similar future decisions as regards a legal change of gender.

== Filmography ==
Year	Title	Role	Notes
1971	Jang Djatuh Dikaki Lelaki	Thug	
1977	Akulah Vivian	Herself	Biopic.
