= Dewi Fortuna Anwar =

Indonesian academic professor

Dewi Anwar
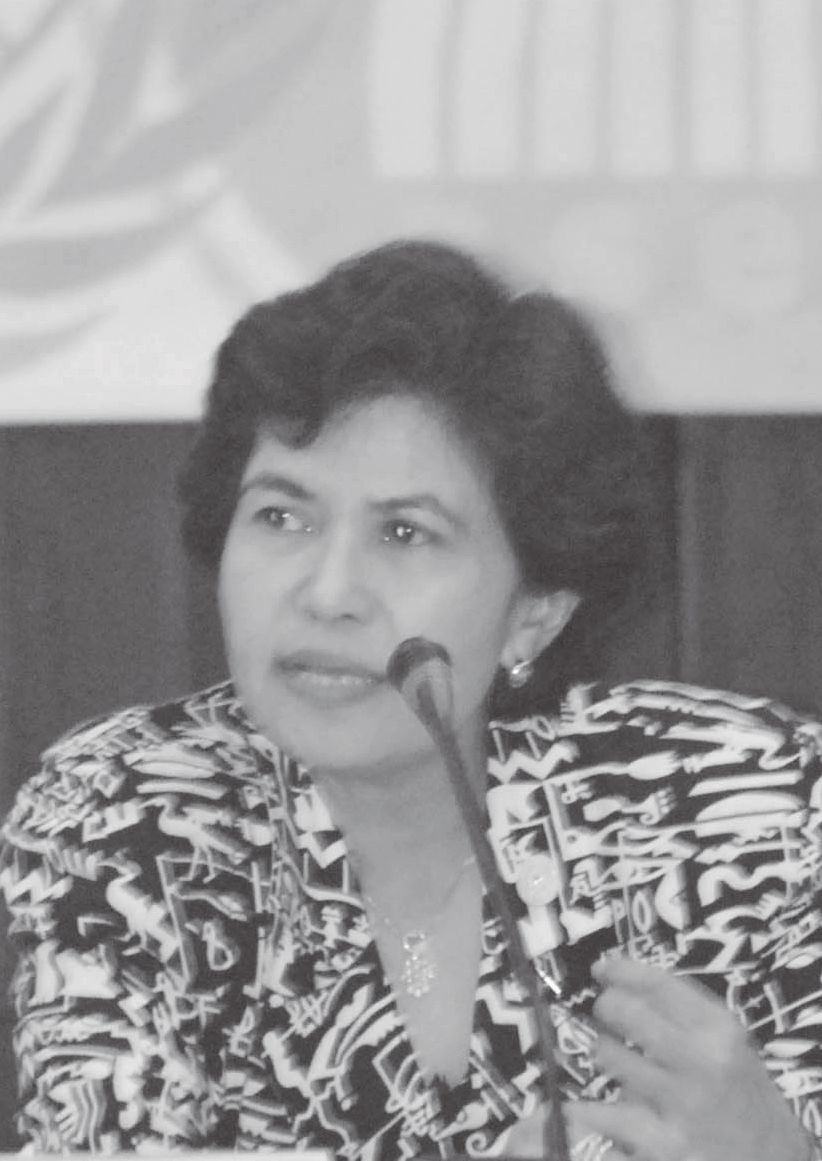
- Anwar in 2011

Spokesperson to the President
- In office 21 May 1998 – 20 October 1999
- President: Bacharuddin Jusuf Habibie
- Preceded by: Saadilah Mursjid (as Minister of State Secretariat and Cabinet Secretary)
- Succeeded by: Wimar Witoelar (as Chairman of Presidential Spokesperson)

Personal details
- Born: 22 May 1958 (age 68) Bandung, West Java, Indonesia
- Party: Independent
- Relations: Sri Danti Anwar (sister); Desi Anwar (sister)
- Education: University of London; Monash University
- Profession: Civil servant

Dewi Fortuna Anwar (born 22 May 1958 in Bandung) is an Indonesian scientist, professor, and the Deputy Secretary for Political Affairs to the Vice President of Indonesia.

== Early life and education ==
She received her Ph.D from Monash University.

== Other activities ==
- Centre for Humanitarian Dialogue, Member of the Board (2019–present)
