= Wimar Witoelar =

Indonesian journalist (1945–2021)

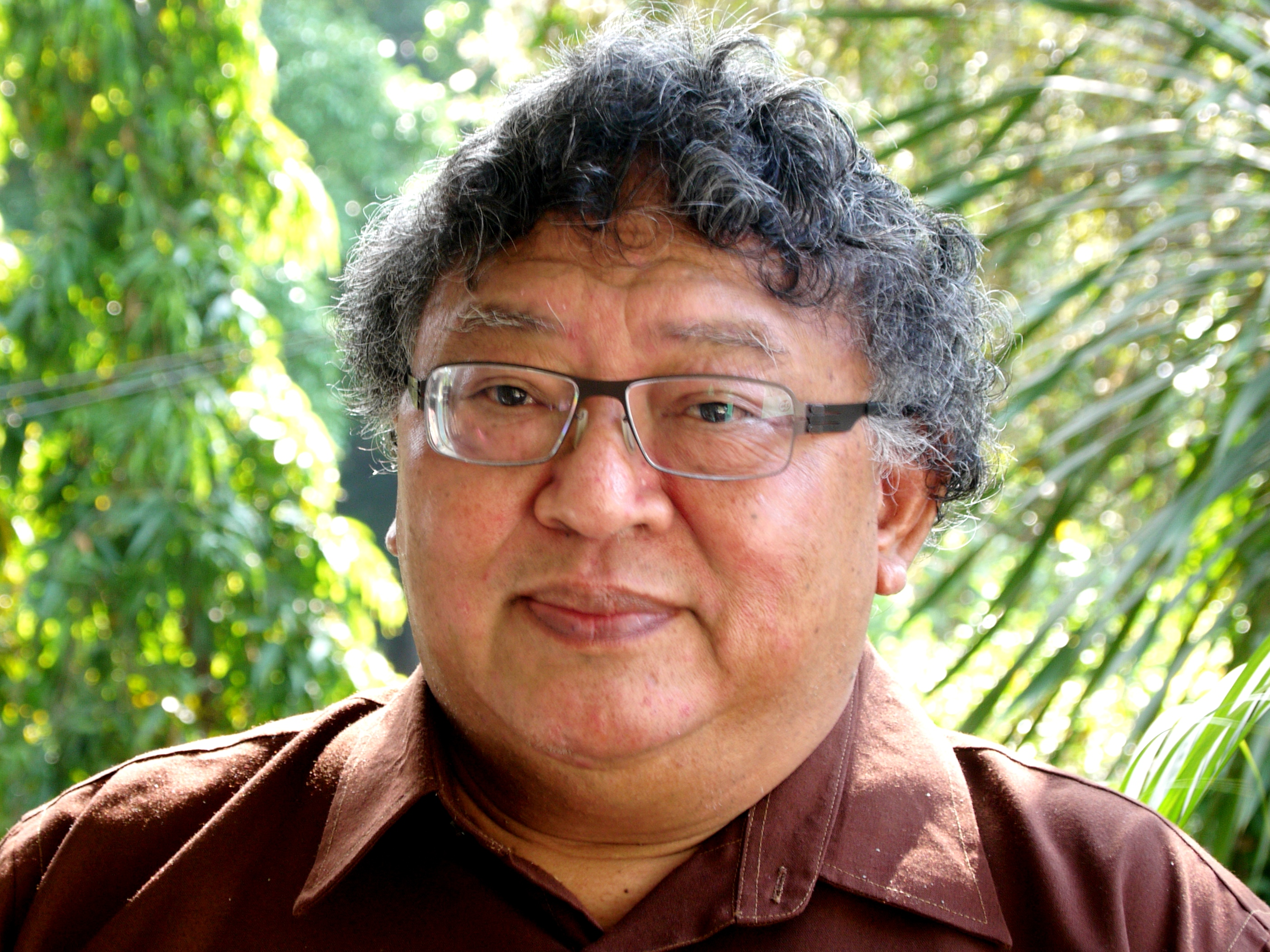
- Witoelar in 2011

Chairman of Presidential Spokesperson
- In office 20 October 1999 – 23 July 2001
- President: Abdurrahman Wahid

Spokesperson to the President
- In office 20 October 1999 – 23 July 2001 Serving with Adhie Massardi, Yahya Cholil Staquf and Wahyu Muryadi
- Preceded by: Dewi Fortuna Anwar
- Succeeded by: Dino Patti Djalal (International Relations); Andi Alfian Mallarangeng (Home Affairs)

Personal details
- Born: 14 July 1945 Padalarang, Japanese East Indies
- Died: 19 May 2021 (aged 75) Jakarta, Indonesia
- Party: Independent
- Spouse: Suvatchara Witoelar
- Relations: Rachmat Witoelar
- Children: 2

Wimar Witoelar (14 July 1945 – 19 May 2021) was an Indonesian journalist and talk show host. He was presidential spokesperson and also chairman of presidential spokesperson to President Abdurrahman Wahid, from 1999 to 2001. He died in Pondok Indah Hospital in Jakarta of complications from sepsis.

== Publications ==
Wimar Witoelar. 2002. No Regrets: Reflections of a Presidential Spokesman, Jakarta: Equinox Publishing, ISBN 979-95898-4-3.
