= Ratna Sitompul =

Indonesian ophthalmologist

Ratna Sitompul (born 6 February 1961) is an Indonesian ophthalmologist, academic, and university administrator. She served as the dean of the medicine faculty of the University of Indonesia from 2008 until at least 2012.

== Early life and education ==
Ratna was born on 6 February 1961 in Jakarta. She completed her medical education at the Faculty of Medicine, University of Indonesia, graduating as a medical doctor in 1990. She then pursued ophthalmology specialization at the same institution, finishing in 1994, and earned her doctoral degree from the University of Indonesia in 2005.

== Career ==
Early in her career, Sitompul worked at RSU Kuala Kapuas, Central Kalimantan, from 1987 to 1989. Afterward, she joined the Faculty of Medicine at the University of Indonesia, serving as a lecturer and as a member of the medical staff, particularly in the field of ophthalmology with a focus on infections and immunology. Between 1999 and 2005, she led the division of infection and immunology within the Department of Ophthalmology. From 2005 to 2008, she was the head of the ophthalmology specialization major in the University of Indonesia.

In April 2008, Sitompul became a candidate for the faculty of medicine dean. She ran against six more senior candidates from the faculty, including the incumbent dean professor Menaldi Rasmin. The first selection process, involving eight candidates, was conducted on 8 April 2008, and shrunk to three candidates in the final selection process on 21 April. Sitompul was named as the new dean on 21 April, coinciding with the Kartini Day. She became the first woman to serve in the position. According to rector Gumilar Rusliwa Somantri, the final selection process was the longest he had to face and jokingly stated that he wanted a dean with no mustache. Sitompul assumed office as dean three days later. In December 2012, a report stated that Sitompul had been dismissed as dean of the Faculty of Medicine, reportedly related to her status as a civil servant in the health ministry.

== Views ==
Sitompul has been outspoken about challenges in Indonesian medical education, stressing the need for stronger communication skills among medical students and professionals. She has highlighted the difficulties students face due to heavy academic workloads and limited leisure time. Sitompul has called for more comprehensive training in communication, seeing it as critical for effective relationships between doctors, patients, and peers. She points to the role of medical educators in modeling ethical and professional conduct, emphasizing that respect for others is a foundation for earning respect within the profession.

She has expressed concerns about the portrayal of medical professionals in media but maintains that public trust remains significant. Sitompul has shared experiences illustrating the positive outcomes of patient-centered care, including receiving personal letters of gratitude from former patients, which she regards as indicative of the value of empathy and respect in medicine.

== Personal life ==
Sitompul is married to Dody Firmanda and has two children.
