= Legal Aid Institute (Jakarta) =

Legal aid service provider in Jakarta

The Legal Aid Institute Jakarta, also known as Lembaga Bantuan Hukum Jakarta (LBH Jakarta), is Indonesia's first legal aid non-government organization. LBH Jakarta seeks to provide legal aid for the poor, aiding with law illiteracy, and suppressed peoples. LBH was established in 1969 in the city of Jakarta as the first LBH of what would eventually become multiple LBH offices around the country. It was not until 1970, with the support of PERADIN and the Provincial government of Jakarta, that LBH officially began commencing in operations. After the establishment of the YLBHI, which also operates out of Jakarta, the LBH located in Jakarta became the legal aid institute for the city.

Now working under the Indonesian Legal Aid Foundation (YLBHI), which has 15 LBH branches throughout Indonesia, the Legal Aid Institute of Jakarta operates based on the principle of Structural Legal Aid. Currently, YLBHI acts as the central umbrella in Jakarta for all of the regional LBH branches throughout Indonesia, it is currently led by Asfinawati as Chairman of Board and Nursyahbani Katjasungkana as the board of trustees.

LBH Jakarta acts heavily in accordance with 'rule of law', a principle entrenched in Indonesia's constitution. Due to its historical influence, predominantly during the post-Suharto era, it is regarded by some as an institution that works with cases that have the ability of serving justice, but also further the aim of better developing political rationales.

In 2017, LBH Jakarta received over 19,000 cases from justice seekers. These cases ranged from involving city and urban issues, labor issues and family issues. In addition they received hundreds of reports dealing with civil society and political concerns, human rights, and women and children issues.

== History ==
=== Background ===
The Legal Aid Institute of Jakarta was established in 1969 following discussion at the third congress of the Indonesian Advocacy Association, and founded by Dr. Albert Hasibuan with the help of Professor Dr. Adnan Buyung Nasution. Dr. Hasibuan was also a prominent human rights lawyer and activist who entered into the legal profession as a prosecutor in the 1950s. Initially, LBH Jakarta was created as a pilot idea with the support from PERADIN (Persatuan Advokat Indonesia), the Indonesian bar association, and from the provincial government of Jakarta. Despite this, LBH has played a historical role in the creation of what is now the Indonesian Legal Aid Foundation (YLBHI), and been a key player in human rights cases throughout Indonesia. LBH was created with the idea of Bantuan Hukum Struktural (Structural Legal Aid) at the forefront of Nasution's motivation for what the institution would eventually become. Nasution maintained the belief that cause lawyering should go beyond the standard routine casework for those who cannot afford it but are in desperate need of it. Officially commencing operations in 1970, LBH took aim at helping those belonging to a lower socio-economic status, operating off of the principle of providing legal aid for the poor, and has been a leading NGO since. During the 1980s LBH Jakarta began applying principles of Structural Legal Aid.

LBH Jakarta was the initial LBH in Indonesia, but not soon after its establishment, the formation of 15 other LBH office branches soon followed. These branches are located in 15 different provinces throughout Indonesia, ranging from Medan and Lampung to Bali and Papua. Given all of these different branches, the Indonesian Legal Aid Foundation (YLBHI) was founded on the basis of supporting the other offices throughout the country.

==== Suharto regime ====
LBH was established while Indonesia was under the authoritarian regime of Suharto. Entering into power in the late 1960s, Suharto and his 'New Order' maintained a dominance in Indonesia until the end of the regime in May 1998. During this time law was hardly effective, which was one of the primary reasons Nasution kept structural legal aid at the forefront of LBH. Throughout the New Order dominance in Indonesia, LBH became an outspoken critic of the leader's authoritarian regime. Thus leading to the legal aid institution, becoming the immediate source of defence for those accused in subversion and political cases. Many significant political trials were litigated by LBH during the Suharto regime.

==== Post-suharto regime ====
The end of the Suharto era was seen as a sign of hope by many within the country, as well as on the international level. Numerous new formal structures like the National Law Commission and Constitutional Commission were entrenched, and the post-Suharto removal of restrictions on political activity, helped to facilitate and further anti-corruption activity; by 2000 approximately 450 legally oriented NGOs were identified, while the more exact numbers were estimated to be in the thousands. However, the creation of several establishments and commissions did not directly result in a guarantee of protection of the rights of the underprivileged. The transition period after the fall of the Suharto regime was immersed with corruption. Communal conflict increased in cases explicitly regarding violence against small ethnic groups, women and the lower-class community. Specific to LBH, the number of cases reported post-Suharto increased drastically, and attacks against various LBH offices escalated during this time period, including the 2001 attack on the LBH Jakarta office.

=== Structural legal aid (bantuan hukum struktural) ===
Ten years after LBH Jakarta began operating, it began to apply the practice of structural legal aid, which has been one of its most unique qualities as a legal aid NGO. Although the concept was only applied ten years after its founding, the concept was essential to the founder Dr. Nasution's vision of the institution who believed that structural legal aid was pivotal to the role of cause lawyering. Through this approach, the importance of addressing the root of human rights violations is maintained. The concept of structural legal aid is often seen as broad, and is consequently applied as such. Structural Legal Aid is a form of litigation. Briefly, it encompasses public interest litigation as well as activities that are non-litigation based. These may include various forms of research, publication and community education; through this model LBH also engages in the discussion and questioning of numerous government policies and practices that breach the legal rights of Indonesia's citizens.

LBH's use of structural legal aid, has brought some challenges to the institution. Given that the approach is quite broad, the institution was operating with various lawyers and legal aid workers of different competencies when it came to the handling of non-court based activities. Additionally, structural legal aid approach also made LBH workers targets of the Suharto regime.

=== Attacks ===
The existence of multiple LBH offices throughout Indonesia have not always been received by the entire Indonesian population. This is due in part to the cases they represent and the political activism they engage in. This has been evidenced in various attacks on the physical offices themselves, as well as direct attacks on LBH Directors. Two of these attacks have been on the LBH/YLBHI Jakarta office.

==== 2001 attack ====
On April 13, 2001, the LBH Jakarta office was attacked by members of the Jakarta Police Precinct. The attack was motivated by the anti-military protests taking place near the LBH Jakarta office. Police officers attempted to arrest some of the demonstrators, some of whom took refuge in the office building. The building was damaged as rocks were thrown at the building, and batons were used to break windows. Five members went on to enter the building, where a Legal Aid Training session (Kalabahu) was being held. 10 of the student activists who sought refuge in the building were assaulted. The attacks on the activists were so violent than an eye-witness claimed to have lost consciousness at the sight of seeing real forms of torture. The LBH Jakarta office being used as a place to take cover is not uncommon as demonstrators often use the building as a safe place whenever interactions between demonstrators and police/military become violent.

==== 2017 attack ====
On September 18, 2017, in the early hours of the morning, the YLBHI office in Jakarta was attacked by hundreds of anti-communists. The attack was provoked by the belief that an event associated to the Communist Party of Indonesia (PKI) was being held inside the building. Initially, a day prior to the attack, a rally was held outside the building in opposition to the events believed to be occurring the next day. This rally was held despite both military and police representatives maintaining that the allegations regarding the event were false. After protestors returned the next day, and were met with police resistance, a mob attacked the building at 1:22 am on the Monday morning, resulting in physical damage.

== Legal aid in indonesia ==
Legal Aid Organizations are not limited to receiving solely government/public funding. They are permitted to receive funds in various forms such as grants or donations. In terms of receiving funding from the government, the Ministry of Justice and Human Rights is solely responsible.

=== New Legal Aid ===
The beginning of the New Legal Aid in Indonesia was marked by the drafting of Law 16/2011. This law marked an important change in legal aid in Indonesia. Prior to the creation of Law 16/2011, legal aid and public interest law organizations, including LBH Jakarta, conducted their work without legislative or regulatory structures. Legal aid NGOs operated off of minimal decrees issued on behalf of the Indonesian Supreme Court, and the Advocates Law of 2003.

Law 16/2011 adds several definitions for legal aid and those who receive legal aid. According to this law legal aid is defined as, "legal assistance that is given by a legal aid provider free of charge to the recipient of legal aid" and the recipient of legal aid is defined as "a poor person or group, and the provision of legal aid includes criminal, civil, and administrative matters, both litigious and non-litigious" This new law was a critical development for legal aid in Indonesia; until this piece of legislation was created the only guidelines regarding legal aid specifically existed in the Advocates Law. However, this new law outlines many more relevant aspects of legal aid such as those who are qualified to give and receive legal aid, in addition to the standards that must be met when administering forms of legal aid.

== Structure ==
=== Cause lawyers ===
A cause lawyer is defined as a "lawyer driven by a "willingness to undertake controversial and politically charged activities and/or by a sense of commitment to particular ideals." Due to the socio-political nature of what unites and drives cause lawyers, they address such issues with the aim of achieving a means of greater social justice, like changing laws or regulations. Through addressing certain issue areas, cause lawyers have the capacity to draw attention to the lack of stability within law and politics. In contrast to a 'hired gun lawyer' a cause lawyer can be seen as quite different; a cause lawyer either works as a volunteer or on quite a low salary.

Cause lawyers are another unique attribute of LBH Indonesia. Since the 1970s LBH has been a prominent force for cause lawyers. The lawyers within LBH take initiative in seeking judicial review of policies, convictions, and government decisions in general, in forms relevant to court action

=== Funding ===
Funding for the Legal Aid Institute of Jakarta has been tumultuous. After 2001, financial support from funding agencies plummeted, the long established donors, Novib and USAID withdrew support. After the Suharto regime collapsed, financial support from domestic sources was scarce. However, LBH has been able to obtain financial support from the Canadian International Development Agency [CIDA], the Partnership Governance Reform in Indonesia [PGRI] and through local donations from the public. LBH Jakarta also receives funding from the Australian Agency for International Development (AusAID).

== Activities ==
LBH Jakarta's activities are categorized into four areas:

- Fair Trial
- Labor Rights
- Urban Poor
- Vulnerable Minority

After the end of the Suharto regime and following the reformation, LBH Jakarta has been one of the leading institutions in terms of representing religious minorities in cases of religious freedom and violations. These cases have become a large part of LBH Jakarta's agenda, especially due to the 'Blasphemy Law' passing in 2010. Two prominent cases LBH Jakarta represented in regards to blasphemy against Islam are the Aan case in 2012, and Muluk case in 2013.

- Alexander Aan was convicted under law 11/2008 on Electronic Transactions and Information. His conviction was based on a post on the "Minang Atheists" Facebook page about Muhammad, and was considered blasphemous against Islam. Under this conviction Aan is classified as "A person who intentionally and without right spreads information that aims to cause hatred or hostility towards an individual and/or particular group that is based on ethnicity, religion, race or inter-group relations".
- Tajul Muluk was convicted of "blaspheming Islam" under Art 156a of the Criminal Code in Indonesia. He was convicted for holding Shia beliefs, which are regarded as inherently "deviant" by mainstream Sunni organizations in Indonesia .

These cases are also examples of the institutions' public interest litigation agenda they have pursued since its early years of implementation. LBH Jakarta has brought cases for judicial review of legislation to the constitutional court, including aforementioned Blasphemy Law in 2010, and in 2012–13.
