= Abraham Samad =

Indonesian lawyer and activist

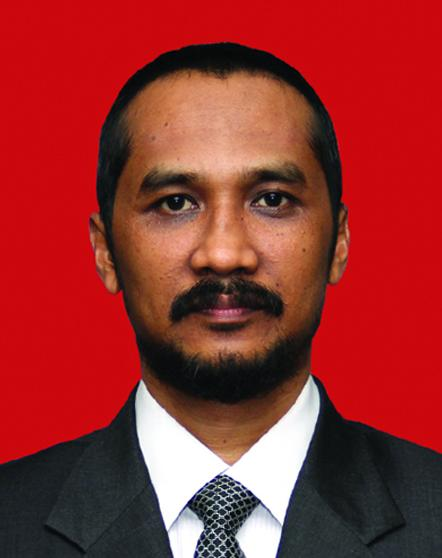

Chairman of Corruption Eradication Commission
- In office 2011–2015
- Deputy: Busyro Muqoddas; Bambang Widjojanto; Adnan Pandu Pradja; Zulkarnaen
- Preceded by: Busyro Muqoddas
- Succeeded by: Taufiequrachman Ruki (acting)

Personal details
- Born: 27 November 1966 (age 59) Makassar, South Sulawesi, Indonesia
- Spouse: Indriana Kartika (m. 1998)
- Children: 2
- Education: Hasanuddin University

Abraham Samad (born 27 November 1966) is an Indonesian lawyer and activist who was elected in December 2011 as chair of the country's Corruption Eradication Commission (KPK) for 2011–2015.

== Early life ==
Abraham was born on 27 November 1966 in Makassar, South Sulawesi. He and his five siblings were the children of an army captain and his wife Indriana Kartika, an employee of the Department of Information; as of 2012, three of his siblings work for the state television station TVRI while his brother Imran is a district head in Rappocini, Makassar. According to Imran, as a child Abraham was hard-headed and forceful when he wanted something.

Abraham, who enjoyed reading about Abraham Lincoln as a youth and considered the American president a hero, attended Kunjung Mae Elementary School in Makassar. He attended three different junior high schools, eventually graduating from Sulaiman Catholic Junior High School. He then finished his secondary education at Cenderawasih Catholic Senior High School. During this period he was known as a quarrelsome student.

== Career ==
Abraham received a bachelor of law degree from Hasanuddin University; he later received his master's and doctoral degrees from the same institution, the latter in 2010. Two years after receiving his bachelor's, Abraham began practising law. He later founded the Anti-Corruption Committee of South Sulawesi, serving as its coordinator. The Jakarta Post describes Abraham as close to several conservative Islamic groups, including the Committee to Uphold Islamic Sharia, for which he acted as a lawyer.

Though human rights activist Bambang Widjojanto was considered the favourite for the KPK chair, the House of Representatives ultimately selected Abraham over both Bambang and the incumbent Muhammad Busyro Muqoddas. Abraham received a total of 43 votes, out of the 56 possible, with Busyro receiving five, Bambang four, Zulkairnain three, and Adnan Pandu Praja one vote. At the time of his election, Abraham was the youngest ever head of the KPK. Abraham said that he would work to improve the country's witness protection programme, improve cooperation between law enforcement agencies, and take steps to prevent – rather than merely react to – corruption.

Some anti-corruption activists expressed disappointment in the decision, stating that Abraham had been selected to please political parties rather than to combat graft. Choky Ramadhan, a member of the Indonesian Judicial Watch Society, suggested that some candidates may not have been chosen as the political parties feared further attention would be paid to money laundering cases involving the parties. Tama Satrya Langkun, of the Indonesia Corruption Watch, noted that Abraham's career was sparse compared to that of the other candidates.

Government offices
Preceded by Busyro Muqoddas	Chairman of the Corruption Eradication Commission; 2011 to 2015	Succeeded by Taufiequrachman Ruki
