= Prita Mulyasari =

Indonesian housewife and mother of two

Prita Mulyasari is an Indonesian housewife and mother of two who in 2008 was a patient at Omni International Hospital in Tangerang, Banten, west of Jakarta, for an illness that was misdiagnosed as dengue fever, whereas she actually had mumps. Her complaints about her misdiagnosis started as a private email that went viral and she was jailed after losing a civil defamation suit taken by the hospital in 2009.

The case highlighted the over-reaction of Indonesian prosecutors when presented with cases being pursued by influential individuals and companies. Due to the proximity of the presidential elections in July 2009, the various candidates either visited Prita Mulyasari in jail or publicly commented on the case.

Support from a group on MySpace attracted considerable support as well as Indonesian blog sites.

The case brought attention to clauses of the Indonesian Information and Electronic Transaction Law which are currently being challenged and questioned as a result of Prita Mulyasari's case.

Prita was fined Rp204 million (US$20,500), causing support for her to grow stronger. A mailing list and Facebook group called "KOIN UNTUK PRITA" (English: "Coin for Prita") started raising money from people throughout Indonesia. People started collecting coins to help Prita to pay the fine. Seeing the huge support for Prita, Omni International Hospital dropped the civil lawsuit.

The Supreme Court of Indonesia in June 2012 overturned Prita's conviction and jail sentence.
