= Corruption Eradication Commission =

Indonesian government agency

Corruption Eradication Commission Komisi Pemberantasan Korupsi
- KPK Emblem
- Abbreviation: KPK

Agency overview
- Formed: 29 December 2003
- Employees: 1,711 (2024)
- Annual budget: Rp 878.04 Billion (2026)

Jurisdictional structure
- National agency: Indonesia
- Operations jurisdiction: Indonesia
- Constituting instruments: Law No. 19/2019 Regarding Corruption Eradication Commission; Law No. 30/2002 Regarding Corruption Eradication Commission
- Specialist jurisdiction: Anti-corruption

Operational structure
- Headquarters: Kuningan Persada Kav. K4, Jakarta 12950, Indonesia
- Agency executive: Setyo Budiyanto, Chairman

Website
- www.kpk.go.id

The Corruption Eradication Commission (Indonesian: Komisi Pemberantasan Korupsi), abbreviated as KPK, is an Indonesian government agency established to prevent and fight corruption in the country.

== History ==
=== Background ===
Anti-corruption efforts began in Indonesia in the 1950s. Following strong criticism of corruption at the beginning of the New Order regime in the late 1960s a Commission of Four was appointed by president Suharto in 1970. The report of the commission noted that corruption was "rampant" but none of the cases it said were in need of urgent action were followed up on. Laws were only passed in 1999 giving the Indonesian National Police and Attorney General of Indonesia the authority to investigate corruption cases.

=== Establishment ===
The KPK was created in 2003 during the Megawati presidency due to high corruption in the Post-Suharto era. Law No.30/2002 on the Corruption Eradication Commission was passed in 2002, providing a legal basis for the establishment of the KPK. Since then, the commission has engaged in significant work, revealing and prosecuting cases of corruption in crucial government bodies reaching as high as the Supreme Court.

== Duties ==
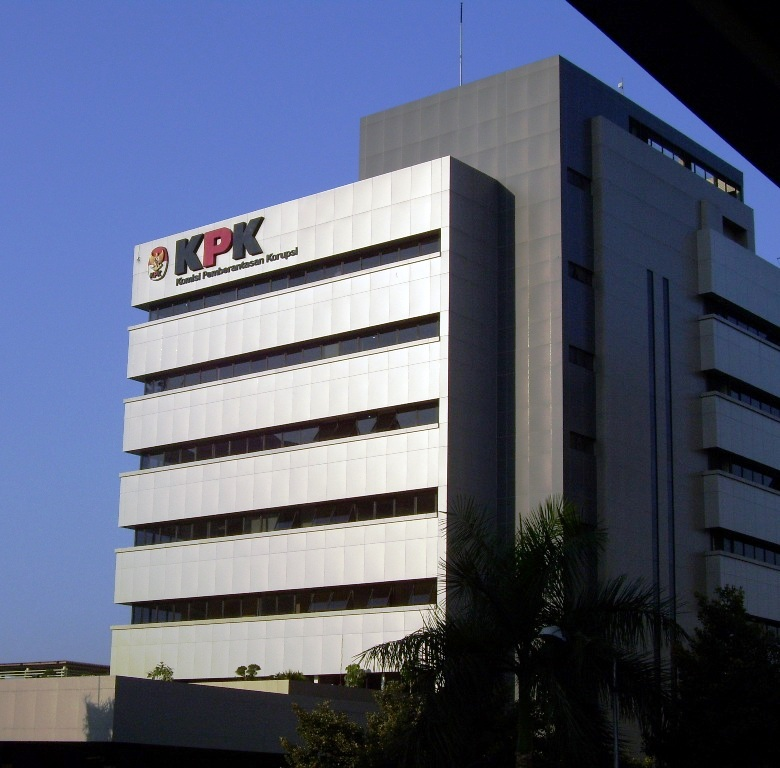
Former KPK headquarters in Jakarta; the building is now used as the commission's Anti-Corruption Learning Center

The KPK vision is to rid Indonesia of corruption. Its duties include investigating and prosecuting corruption cases and monitoring the governance of the state. It has the authority to request meetings and reports in the course of its investigations. It can also authorize wiretaps, impose travel bans, request financial information about suspects, freeze financial transactions and request the assistance of law enforcement agencies. It also has the authority to detain suspects, including well-known figures, and frequently does so.

=== Independent from influence ===
The KPK was originally independent and free from the influence of any power in carrying out its duties and authorities. However, in 2019, the Indonesian legislature passed a bill removing many of the KPK's powers and making its employees civil servants, effectively ending its independence.

== Achievements ==
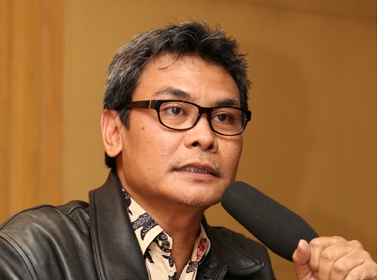
Johan Budi, a former spokesman of the Commission

The work of the KPK is a source of continuing controversy in Indonesia. The commission is careful, but sometimes quite aggressive, in pursuing high-profile cases.

For example, in reporting on the activities of the KPK, one foreign observer noted that the commission has:

"confronted head-on the endemic corruption that remains as a legacy of President Suharto’s 32-year-long kleptocracy. Since it started operating in late 2003, the commission has investigated, prosecuted and achieved a 100-percent conviction rate in 86 cases of bribery and graft related to government procurements and budgets."

To display once more its resolve to crack down on graft suspects, the KPK named on 7 December 2012, both brothers of Indonesian socialite Rizal Mallarangeng, Indonesia's Sports Minister Andi Mallarangeng and Fox Indonesia consultant Choel Mallarangeng suspects in a multimillion-dollar corruption case, in the latest scandal to hit the President Susilo Bambang Yudhoyono's ruling party ahead of Indonesia's 2014 Presidential election. Mallarangeng is the first minister to resign on graft allegations since the KPK began operating in 2003.

KPK public education division official Budiono Prakoso said in December 2008 that because of its limited manpower and resources, of some 16,200 cases reported to the Corruption Eradication Commission (KPK), only a small number had been dealt with.

A large number of the solid reports informed the KPK of alleged cases of corruption and misuse of budget funds by government agencies at national and regional levels. He said:

"The main problem is the political will of the government at regional and national levels. Political will remains low. Everything is still at a lip-service level."

NGO activists often urge the KPK to be more aggressive in its work. For example, Bali Corruption Watch (BCW) head Putu Wirata Dwikora asked the KPK to investigate corruption cases in Bali. He lamented the commission's practice of handing over corruption cases in Bali to the local prosecutor's office for further investigation. Putu said:

"The KPK should be directly involved in investigations to create a deterrent effect."

On the other hand, the success of the KPK in using controversial tools like warrantless wiretaps, and its focus on high-level targets like "businessmen, bureaucrats, bankers, governors, diplomats, lawmakers, prosecutors, police officials and other previously untouchable members of Indonesian society", has led to something of a backlash. There have been reported attempts to undermine the commission in parliament.

== Tensions between the government and KPK ==
During its course, KPK often sees a number of controversial efforts by People's Representative Council and other government institutions to weaken or disrupt the work of KPK. Leaders and prominent of figures of KPK have been repeatedly arrested for a disputable criminal case or receiving personal attacks.

=== "Gecko vs crocodile" dispute ===
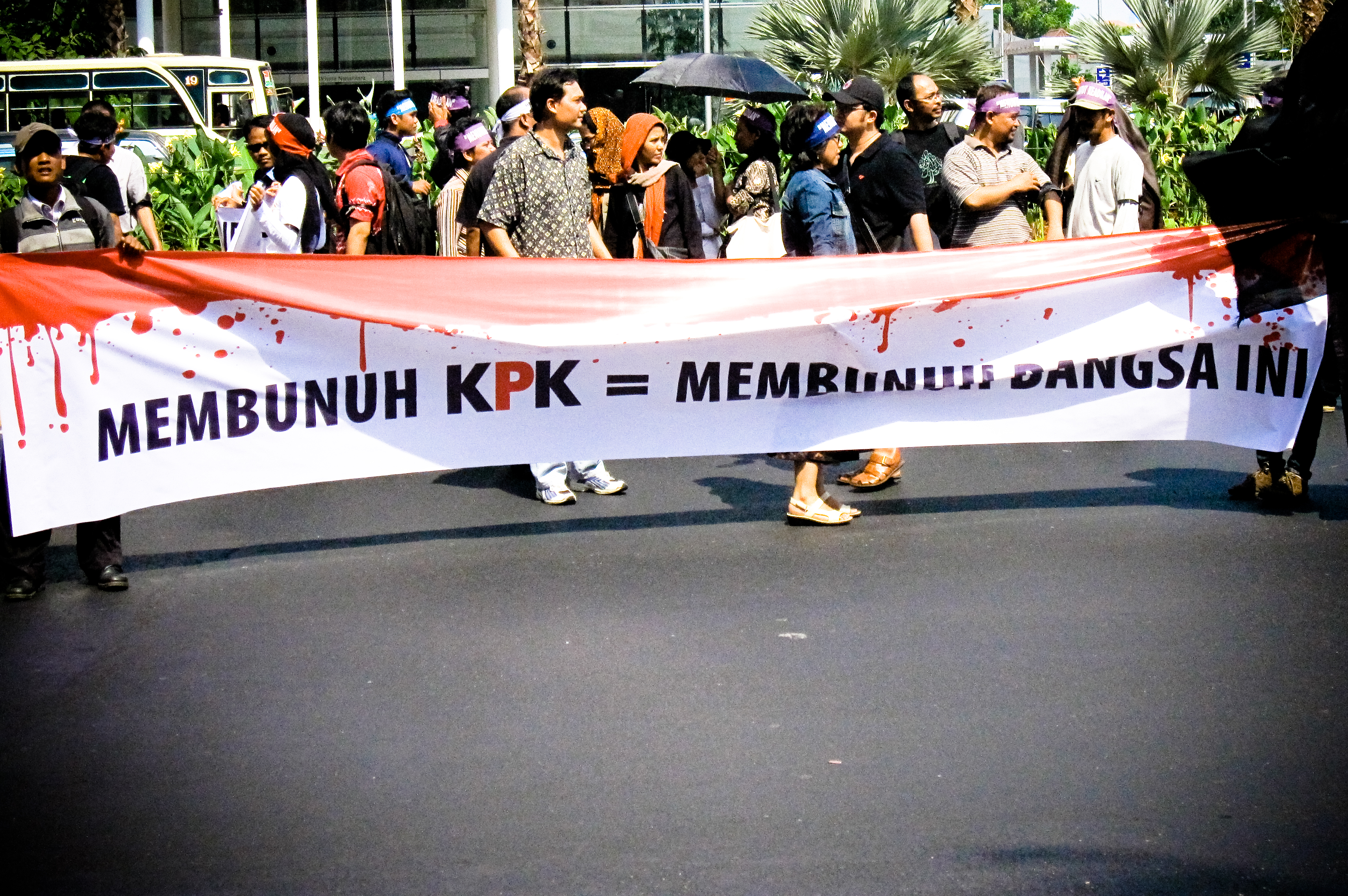
Rally in support of the KPK. Slogan translates as "Killing the KPK = killing this nation".

In April 2009, angry that the KPK had tapped his phone while investigating a corruption case, Indonesian Police chief detective Susno Duadji compared the KPK to a gecko (Indonesian: cicak) fighting a crocodile (Indonesian: buaya), the police. Susno's comment, as it turned out, quickly backfired because the image of a cicak standing up to a buaya (similar to David and Goliath imagery) immediately had wide appeal in Indonesia. A noisy popular movement in support of the cicak quickly emerged. Students staged pro-cicak demonstrations, many newspapers ran cartoons with cicaks lining up against an ugly buaya, and numerous TV talk shows took up the cicak versus buaya topic with enthusiasm.

As a result, references to cicaks fighting a buaya have become a well-known part of the political imagery of Indonesia. In September, two KPK deputy chairmen Chandra Hamzah and Bibit Samad Rianto, who had been suspended in July, were arrested on charges of extortion and bribery. The two men denied the charges, saying they were being framed to weaken the KPK.

There were demonstrations in several cities in support of the men and a support campaign on the Facebook social networking site gathered one million members. On 2 November 2009, President Susilo Bambang Yudhoyono established a team to look into the allegations. The following day, during a hearing at the Indonesian Constitutional Court, dramatic tapes were played of bugged phone conversations apparently revealing a conspiracy to undermine the KPK.

The names of businessman Susno Duadji as well as Deputy Attorney General Abdul Hakim Ritonga and a businessman, Anggodo Widjojo, were mentioned in the tapes. Bibit and Chandra were released later the same day.

The team established by the president, the "Team of Eight", presented its recommendations on 17 November 2009. These included a halt to the prosecution of Bibit and Chandra, punishment for officials guilty of wrongdoing and the establishment of a state commission to implement institutional reforms of law enforcement agencies. The president said he would respond within the week.

On 23 November 2009, President Yudhoyono made a speech responding to the Team of Eight's findings. He said that it would be better if the Bibit-Chandra case were settled out of court but did not call for the case to be dropped. He also said there was a need for reforms within the Indonesian National Police, the Attorney General's office and the KPK. His speech caused confusion among Team of Eight members and provoked a protest from activists who symbolically threw in their towels as a way of criticising what they judged to be the president's unconvincing response. On 3 December 2009, President Yudhoyono was officially informed that charges against Bibit and Chandra had been dropped.

=== Trial of Antasari Azhar ===
On 10 November, at the trial of KPK chairman Antasari Azhar, who had been arrested in May for allegedly organising the murder of a businessman, former South Jakarta police chief Williardi Wizard testified that senior police officers had asked him to help them frame Azhari.

=== Arrest of Bambang Widjojanto ===
The arrest of KPK deputy chairman Bambang Widjojanto by Indonesian Police on 23 January 2015 revived the "gecko vs crocodile" dispute. The arrest was made after the commission declared the parliament-approved candidate for the chief of Indonesian Police Budi Gunawan a suspect in a gratification case on 14 February, just days before his scheduled inauguration.

The Indonesian public saw the arrest as an attack against KPK, and there was immediate support for the KPK. Immediately after the news of his arrest broke, various groups demonstrating in front of KPK headquarters in South Jakarta to show support for the organization.

Netizens also created the hashtag #SaveKPK and it emerged as a worldwide trending topic on social media Twitter.

=== Revision of the KPK Law ===
On 17 September 2019, the People's Representative Council passed a bill revising Law No.30/2002 about Corruption Eradication in the country, which triggered a backlash by people taking the view that the revised bill would weaken the ability of the KPK to operate and perform investigations into corruption cases. The revised bill was deliberated and passed in only 12 days in the Council. In a statement, the KPK said that it was not involved consulted over in the discussion of the revision.

A series of mass demonstrations led by students took place in major cities of Indonesia from 23 September 2019 to protest against the KPK Law revision, as well as several bills. The protesters were mainly students from more than 300 universities, and had no association with any particular political parties or groups.

The protests subsequently developed into the largest student movement in Indonesia since the 1998 demonstrations that brought down the Suharto regime.

Under the revised law, the KPK commissioners had their authority to investigate alleged corruption and to prosecute people reduced. In addition, an oversight council was appointed, which had to approve all wiretapping in advance. Finally, as a result of the revised law, all KPK staff had to take a nationalism test, which 75 failed, making them eligible for dismissal. The remaining staff lost their independent status and were sworn in as civil servants on 31 May 2021. Among those failing was senior investigator Novel Baswedan, who had handled a number of cases involving senior government officials and police officers. He was dismissed on 30 September 2021, along with 57 other staff members.

== Resources ==
Resources provided to the KPK have expanded in recent years. However, the work of the commission is still restricted by limited budgets and a small number of total staff.

KPK: Budget and staff, 2008 - 2011

Year	Budget Rp bn	Budget $US mn	KPK Staff	$US per staff member
2008	233	24.6	540	45,550
2009	315	33.3	652	51,070
2010	431	45.5	638	71,320
2011	540	57.0	752	75,800

== Commission chairmen ==
- 2003 to 2007 Taufiequrachman Ruki
- 2007 to 2009 Antasari Azhar
- 2009 to 2010 Tumpak Hatorangan Panggabean (interim)
- 2010 to 2011 Busyro Muqoddas
- 2011 to 2015 Abraham Samad
- February 2015 to December 2015 Taufiequrachman Ruki (interim)
- 2015 to 2019 Agus Raharjo
- 2019 to 2023 Firli Bahuri
- 2023 to 2024 Nawawi Pomolango (interim)
- 2024 to present Setyo Budiyanto
