= Dino Patti Djalal =

Indonesian diplomat

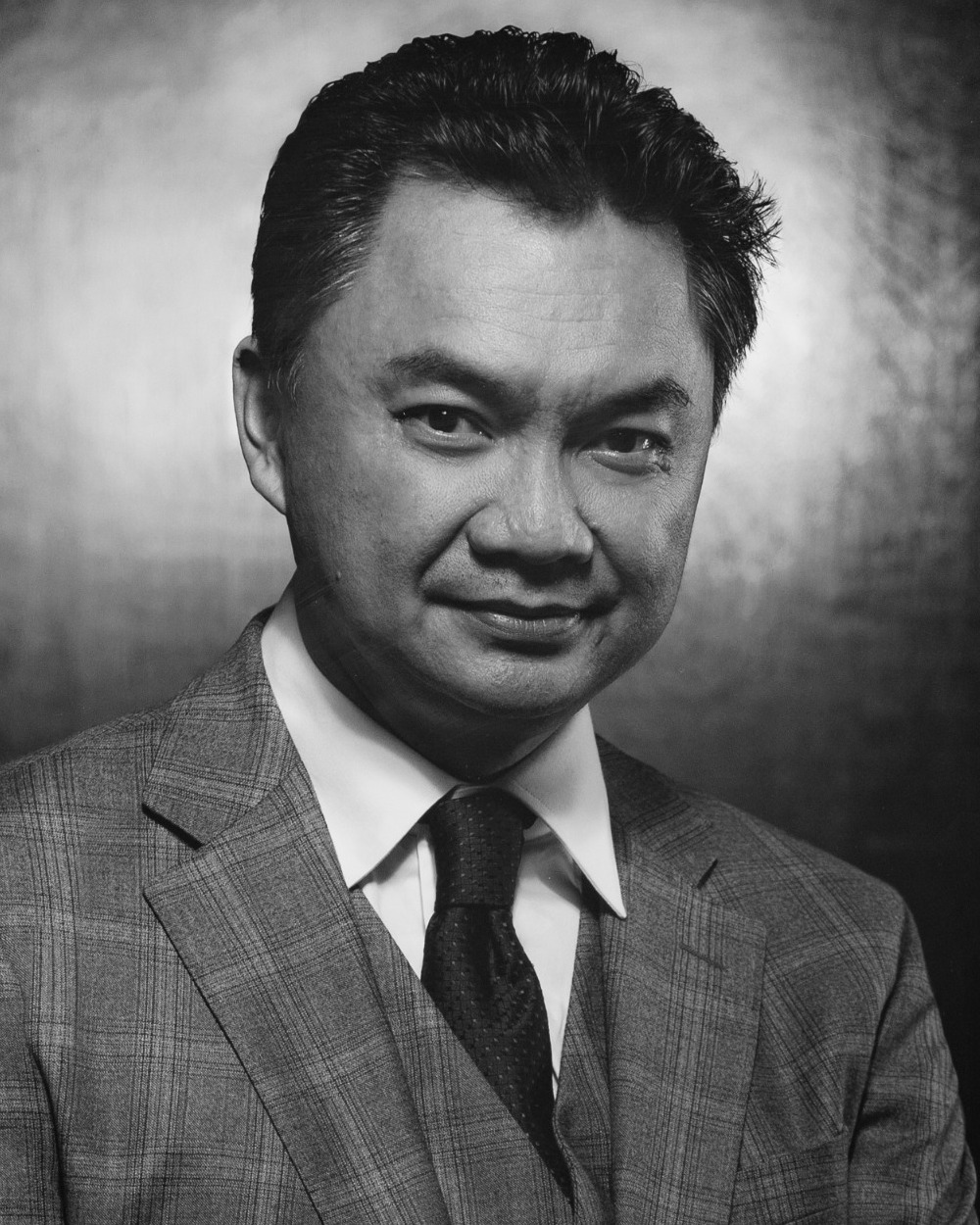
- Djalal as the Ambassador of Indonesia to the United States, 2010

5th Deputy Minister of Foreign Affairs
- In office 14 July 2014 – 20 October 2014
- President: Susilo Bambang Yudhoyono
- Preceded by: Wardana
- Succeeded by: Abdurrahman Mohammad Fachir

17th Ambassador of Indonesia to the United States
- In office 10 August 2010 – 17 September 2013
- President: Susilo Bambang Yudhoyono
- Preceded by: Sudjadnan Parnohadiningrat
- Succeeded by: Budi Bowoleksono

Spokesperson to the President for International Relations
- In office 21 October 2004 – 6 September 2010 Serving with Andi Alfian Mallarangeng
- President: Susilo Bambang Yudhoyono
- Preceded by: Wimar Witoelar (as Chairman of Presidential Spokespersons)
- Succeeded by: Teuku Faizasyah

Personal details
- Born: 10 September 1965 (age 60) Belgrade, Yugoslavia
- Party: Independent
- Spouse: Rosa Raj Djalal
- Children: 3
- Education: Carleton University (BA); Simon Fraser University (MA); London School of Economics (PhD)
- Profession: Diplomat; civil servant

Dino Patti Djalal (born 10 September 1965) is a former Indonesian ambassador to the United States and Deputy Foreign Minister of Indonesia. He resigned from the Ministry of Foreign Affairs in September 2013 to pursue a presidential primary bid.

Djalal heads the Foreign Policy Community of Indonesia, a think-tank and non-political organization in Indonesia focused on international relations, Southeast Asia, and the Indo-Pacific.

== Early life and education ==
Dino Patti Djalal was born in Belgrade, Yugoslavia, on 10 September 1965. His father was Hasjim Djalal, an Indonesian diplomat; former Ambassador to Germany, Canada, and the United Nations; and expert on the law of the sea.

Djalal completed his high school at McLean, Virginia, United States. He received a bachelor's degree in political science at the Carleton University in Ottawa, Canada a master's degree in political science from Simon Fraser University in Vancouver. Djalal also obtained a Ph.D. in international relations from the London School of Economics and Political Science in London, United Kingdom.

== Career ==
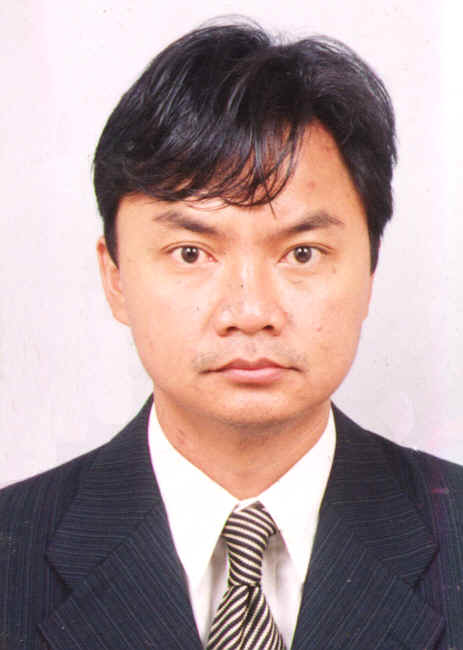
Dino Patti Djalal in 2000, during his assignment as the head of politics at the embassy in Washington D.C.

His career began in 1987 when he joined the Departement of Foreign Affairs. He held various important assignments, including as the Spokesperson for the P3TT Task Force (Implementing the Opinion Determination in East Timor), Head of the Political Department at the Indonesian Embassy in Washington.

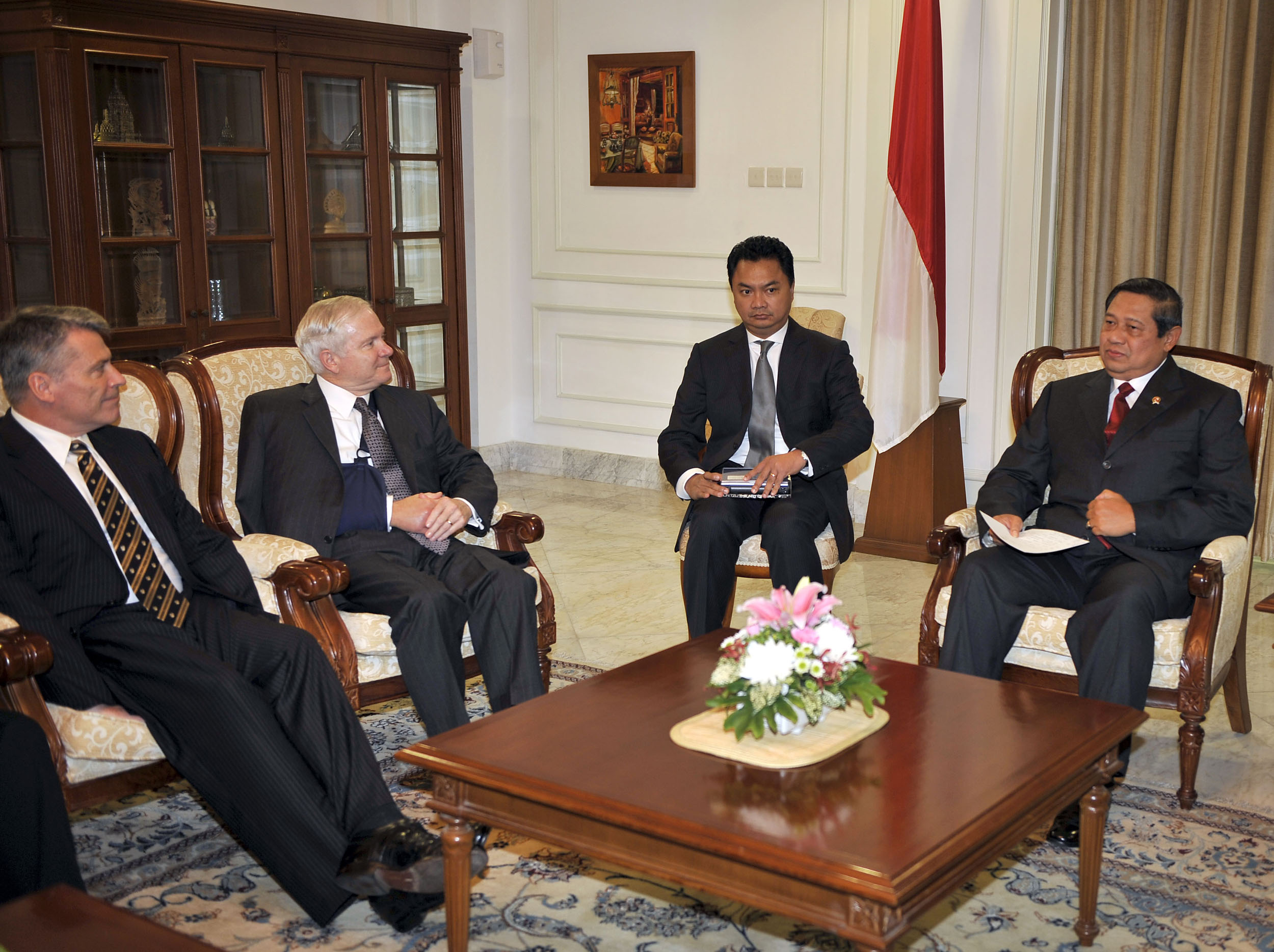
U.S. Defense Secretary Robert M. Gates, second from left and President Susilo Bambang Yudhoyono, right, meet at the presidential palace in Jakarta, Indonesia, 25 February 2008. Djalal appears to be accompanying President Yudhoyono from the back left side

He also served as Director of North and Central American Affairs at the Indonesian Department of Foreign Affairs, before being appointed along with Andi Alfian Mallarangeng, as the Presidential Spokesperson when Susilo Bambang Yudhoyono became President of Indonesia.

== Personal life ==
Djalal is married to Rosa Rai Djalal. The couple has three children, Alexa, Keanu and Chloe.

== Honours ==
=== National ===
- Indonesia :
  - Bintang Mahaputera Adipradana (25 Agustus 2025)
  - Bintang Mahaputera Utama (11 Oktober 2014)
  - Bintang Jasa Utama (10 Agustus 2010)

=== Foreign ===
- Ukraine :
  - Order of Merit 3rd Class (2024)

== Publications ==
Djalal has written 11 books, including the bestseller Harus Bisa.
