= Andi Alfian Mallarangeng =

Indonesian politician (born 1963)

Andi Mallarangeng
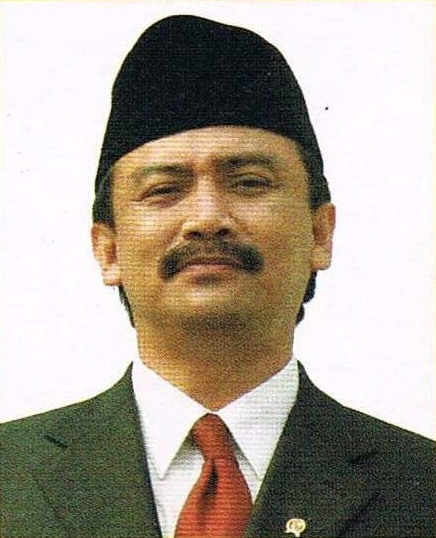
- Mallarangeng in 2009

10th Minister of Youth and Sports
- In office 22 October 2009 – 7 December 2012
- Preceded by: Adhyaksa Dault
- Succeeded by: Agung Laksono (Acting); Roy Suryo

Spokesperson to the President for the Home Affairs
- In office 21 October 2004 – 20 October 2009 Serving with Dino Patti Djalal
- President: Susilo Bambang Yudhoyono
- Preceded by: Wimar Witoelar (as Chairman of Presidential Spokespersons)
- Succeeded by: Julian Aldrin Pasha

Personal details
- Born: 14 March 1963 (age 63) Makassar, South Sulawesi, Indonesia
- Party: Democratic Party (since 2005)
- Other political affiliations: United Democratic Nationhood Party (2002-2004); Independent (2004–2005)
- Spouse: Vitri Cahyaningsih
- Children: 3
- Education: Gajah Mada University; Northern Illinois University
- Profession: Politician

Andi Alfian Mallarangeng (born 14 March 1963 in Makassar, South Sulawesi) is an Indonesian politician who served as Minister of Youth and Sports at Second United Indonesia Cabinet. He was also served as presidential spokesperson for President Susilo Bambang Yudhoyono during Yudhoyono's first term. In 2012, he resigned from his position as minister due to corruption charges against him.

== Political career ==
His involvement in the reform movement continued when he was a member of the General Elections Commission (KPU), the representative of the government, which organized the first democratic elections in 1999. With the establishment of the Ministry of Regional Autonomy in the reform era, Mallarangeng resigned from the KPU and joined as an expert staff of Ministers Country of Autonomy Region (1999–2000). The ministry was later dissolved despite being only 10 months old. He then worked on developing the idea of good governance as the Chair of Policy Committee on Partnership for Governance Reform (2000–2002). He had founded the Democratic Nationhood Party (Partai Persatuan Demokrasi Kebangsaan) with Ryaas Rasyid in 2002.

Mallarangeng quit being a lecturer in October 2004, when he was appointed as Presidential Spokesperson by President Yudhoyono.

== Corruption case ==
On 7 December 2012, he officially resigned his post as Minister of Youth and Sports of the Republic of Indonesia after he was listed as a suspect in a graft case related to the construction of the Hambalang sports complex in Sentul, Bogor, West Java by the Corruption Eradication Commission (KPK). On 11 January 2013, Yudhoyono appointed Roy Suryo as the new Minister for Youth and Sports. On 17 October, he was officially detained in the detention center Corruption Eradication Commission. Mallarangeng was officially detained after nearly a year of investigation.

He was sentenced to four years in prison and ordered to pay Rp 200 million. On 21 April 2017, he was released, though he is still expected to report to Sukamiskin Penitentiary.
