= Adnan Buyung Nasution =

Indonesian lawyer and activist

- Adnan Buyung Nasution
- Born: Adnan Bahrum Nasution; 20 July 1934; Batavia, Dutch East Indies
- Died: 23 September 2015 (aged 81); Jakarta, Indonesia
- Education: Universitas Indonesia; University of Melbourne; Utrecht University
- Occupation: Lawyer
- Known for: Senior lawyer Founder of Lembaga Bantuan Hukum
- Website: Adnan Buyung Nasution & Partners

Adnan Buyung Nasution, also known as Adnan Bahrum Nasution (20 July 1934 – 23 September 2015) was an Indonesian lawyer, advocate, and activist.

== Early life and education ==
Adnan Buyung Nasution was born in Batavia (now Jakarta), Dutch East Indies, on 20 July 1934. From a young age, he demonstrated a strong interest in legal and social issues, which later shaped his career as one of Indonesia’s most prominent legal reformers.

He pursued his undergraduate studies at the University of Indonesia, where he earned a bachelor's degree in law. He later continued his education abroad, obtaining a degree in International Law from the University of Melbourne in Australia. Nasution went on to earn a doctorate from Rijksuniversiteit Utrecht in the Netherlands and later received the title of Professor of Law from Melbourne Law School at the University of Melbourne.

== Career ==
Nasution founded the Legal Aid Institute in Indonesia. He was well known as a human rights and pro-democracy activist during the reign of Indonesia's late President Suharto. One of the partners at his law firm was former Chief Justice of the Supreme Court of Indonesia Suryadi.

From the years 2007 to 2009, Nasution was a member of the Presidential Advisory Council's Legal Department.

== Notable cases ==
- In 1973, Vivian Rubiyanti Iskandar retained Nasution as counsel before the West Jakarta District Court. Nasution helped produce a ruling in favour of changing Vivian's legal gender to female, making her the first legally recognised transgender person in Indonesia.

== Death ==
Nasution died in Jakarta on 23 September 2015 from kidney failure and heart failure.
