= National Unity Cabinet =

Indonesian government cabinet from 1999 to 2001

National Unity Cabinet Kabinet Persatuan Nasional
- 36th Cabinet of Indonesia
- 1999–2000
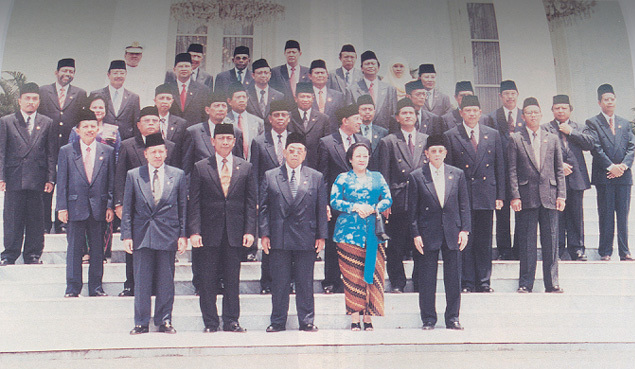
- President Abdurrahman Wahid (front row, centre) with the newly-elected cabinet in front of the Istana Merdeka, 29 October 1999
- Date formed: 29 October 1999
- Date dissolved: 23 August 2000

People and organisations
- President: Abdurrahman Wahid
- Vice President: Megawati Sukarnoputri
- No. of ministers: 34
- Member parties: Central Axis: PKB; PPP; PAN; PKS; PBB; PDI-P; Golkar; Independent
- Status in legislature: Supermajority coalition 436 / 500
- Opposition party: PKP; PNU; PDKB (id); PDI

History
- Elections: 1999 Indonesian legislative election 1999 Indonesian presidential election
- Predecessor: Development Reform Cabinet
- Successor: National Unity Cabinet (Reshuffle)

The National Unity Cabinet (Indonesian: Kabinet Persatuan Nasional) was the Indonesian cabinet which served under President Abdurrahman Wahid and Vice President Megawati Sukarnoputri from 29 October 1999 until 23 July 2001. The Cabinet was formed after Wahid and Megawati were elected President and Vice President by the People's Consultative Assembly (MPR). The cabinet was originally designed to look after the interests of the various political parties and the Indonesian National Armed Forces, but this notion quickly disappeared as Wahid's presidency began to break down.

== Members ==
President	Vice President
Abdurrahman Wahid	Megawati Sukarnoputri

Position	Name	Took office	Left office
Coordinating ministers
Coordinating Minister of Politics and Security (renamed Coordinating Minister of Politics, Social and Security since the first reshuffle)	Wiranto	29 October 1999	15 February 2000
Coordinating Minister of Politics and Security (renamed Coordinating Minister of Politics, Social and Security since the first reshuffle)	Suryadi Sudirja	15 February 2000	26 August 2000
Coordinating Minister of Politics and Security (renamed Coordinating Minister of Politics, Social and Security since the first reshuffle)	Susilo Bambang Yudhoyono	26 August 2000	1 June 2001
Coordinating Minister of Politics and Security (renamed Coordinating Minister of Politics, Social and Security since the first reshuffle)	Agum Gumelar	1 June 2001	23 July 2001
Coordinating Minister of the Economy, Finance, and Industry	Kwik Kian Gie	29 October 1999	23 July 2000
Coordinating Minister of the Economy, Finance, and Industry	Rizal Ramli	1 June 2001	12 June 2001
Coordinating Minister of the Economy, Finance, and Industry	Burhanuddin Abdullah	12 June 2001	23 July 2001
Coordinating Minister of People's Welfare and Abolition of Poverty (combined with Coordinating Minister of Politics and Security since the first reshuffle)	Hamzah Haz	29 October 1999	26 November 1999
Coordinating Minister of People's Welfare and Abolition of Poverty (combined with Coordinating Minister of Politics and Security since the first reshuffle)	Basri Hasanuddin	26 November 1999	26 August 2000
Departmental ministers
Minister of Home Affairs	Suryadi Sudirja	29 October 1999	23 July 2001
Minister of Foreign Affairs	Alwi Shihab	29 October 1999	23 July 2001
Minister of Defence	Juwono Sudarsono	29 October 1999	26 August 2000
Minister of Defence	Mahfud MD	26 November 1999	20 July 2001
Minister of Defence	Agum Gumelar	20 July 2001	23 July 2001
Minister of Laws and Legislation (renamed Minister of Justice and Human Rights since the first reshuffle)	Yusril Ihza Mahendra	29 October 1999	7 February 2001
Minister of Laws and Legislation (renamed Minister of Justice and Human Rights since the first reshuffle)	Baharuddin Lopa	9 February 2001	1 June 2001
Minister of Laws and Legislation (renamed Minister of Justice and Human Rights since the first reshuffle)	Marsillam Simanjuntak	1 June 2001	20 July 2001
Minister of Laws and Legislation (renamed Minister of Justice and Human Rights since the first reshuffle)	Mahfud MD	20 July 2001	23 July 2001
Minister of Finance	Bambang Sudibyo	29 October 1999	26 August 2000
Minister of Finance	Prijadi Praptosuhardjo	26 June 2000	12 June 2001
Minister of Finance	Rizal Ramli	12 June 2001	23 July 2001
Minister of Mining and Energy (renamed Minister of Energy and Mineral Resources since the first reshuffle)	Susilo Bambang Yudhoyono	29 October 1999	26 August 2000
Minister of Mining and Energy (renamed Minister of Energy and Mineral Resources since the first reshuffle)	Purnomo Yusgiantoro	26 August 2000	23 July 2001
Minister of Industry and Trade	Jusuf Kalla	29 October 1999	26 April 2000
Minister of Industry and Trade	Luhut Binsar Panjaitan	26 April 2000	23 July 2001
Minister of Agriculture (renamed Minister of Agriculture and Forestry since the first reshuffle)	M. Prakosa	29 October 1999	26 August 2000
Minister of Agriculture (renamed Minister of Agriculture and Forestry since the first reshuffle)	Bungaran Saragih	26 August 2000	23 July 2001
Minister of Forestry and Plantation (renamed Junior Minister of Forestry since the first reshuffle)	Nurmahmudi Ismail	29 October 1999	15 March 2001
Minister of Forestry and Plantation (renamed Junior Minister of Forestry since the first reshuffle)	Marzuki Usman	15 March 2001	23 July 2001
Minister of Transportation	Agum Gumelar	29 October 1999	1 June 2001
Minister of Transportation	Budi Mulyawan Suyitno	1 June 2001	23 July 2001
Minister of Maritime Exploration (renamed Minister of Maritime Affairs and Fisheries since the first reshuffle)	Sarwono Kusumaatmaja	29 October 1999	1 June 2001
Minister of Maritime Exploration (renamed Minister of Maritime Affairs and Fisheries since the first reshuffle)	Rokhmin Dahuri	1 June 2001	23 July 2001
Minister of Manpower (renamed Minister of Manpower and Transmigration since the first reshuffle)	Bomer Pasaribu	29 October 1999	26 August 2000
Minister of Manpower (renamed Minister of Manpower and Transmigration since the first reshuffle)	Al Hilal Hamdi	26 August 2000	23 July 2001
Minister of Health (renamed Minister of Health and Social Welfare since the first reshuffle)	Achmad Sujudi	29 October 1999	23 July 2001
Minister of National Education	Yahya Muhaimin	29 October 1999	23 July 2001
Minister of Religious Affairs	Tolchah Hasan	29 October 1999	23 July 2001
Minister of Settlement and Regional Development (renamed Minister of Settlement and Regional Infrastructure since the first reshuffle)	Erna Witoelar	29 October 1999	23 July 2001

== State ministers ==
- State Minister of Research and Technology: A. S. Hikam
- State Minister of Cooperatives and Small to Medium Businesses: Zarkasih Nur
- State Minister of Environment: Soni Keraf
- State Minister of Regional Autonomy: Ryaas Rasyid
- State Minister of Tourism and Arts: Hidayat Jaelani
- State Minister of Investment and State-Owned Enterprises: Laksamana Sukardi
- State Minister of Youth and Sports: Mahadi Sinambela
- State Minister of Female Empowerment: Khofifah Indar Parawansa
- State Minister of Public Works: Rafig Budiro Sucipto
- State Minister of Human Rights: Hasballah M. Saad
- State Minister of Transmigration and Population: Hilal Hamdi
- State Minister of State Apparatus Utilization: Freddy Numberi
- State Minister of Public Issues: Anak Agung Gde Agung

== Officials with ministerial rank ==
- Commander of the Armed Forces: Admiral Widodo A. S.
- Attorney General: Marzuki Darusman
- State Secretary: Ali Rahman

== Changes (up to August 2000) ==
- 26 November 1999: Hamzah Haz resigned from the Cabinet and was replaced by Basri Hasanuddin as Coordinating Minister of People's Welfare and Abolition of Poverty.
- 4 January 2000: Ali Rahman resigned as State Secretary and was replaced by Bondan Gunawan
- February 2000: Wiranto was replaced by Suryadi Sudirja as Coordinating Minister of Politics, Social, and Security. Suryadi retains his position as Minister of Home Affairs.
- 24 April 2000: Jusuf Kalla and Laksamana Sukardi were replaced by Luhut Binsar Panjaitan and Rozi Munir as Minister of Industry and Trade and State Minister of Investment and State Owned Enterprises respectively.
- 29 May 2000: Bondan Gunawan resigned as State Secretary and was replaced by Djohan Effendi.
- 10 August 2000: Kwik Kian Gie resigned as Coordinating Minister of Economics, Finance, and Industry.

== Reshuffle ==
National Unity Cabinet (Reshuffle) Kabinet Persatuan Nasional (Perombakan)
- 36th Cabinet of Indonesia
- 2000–2001
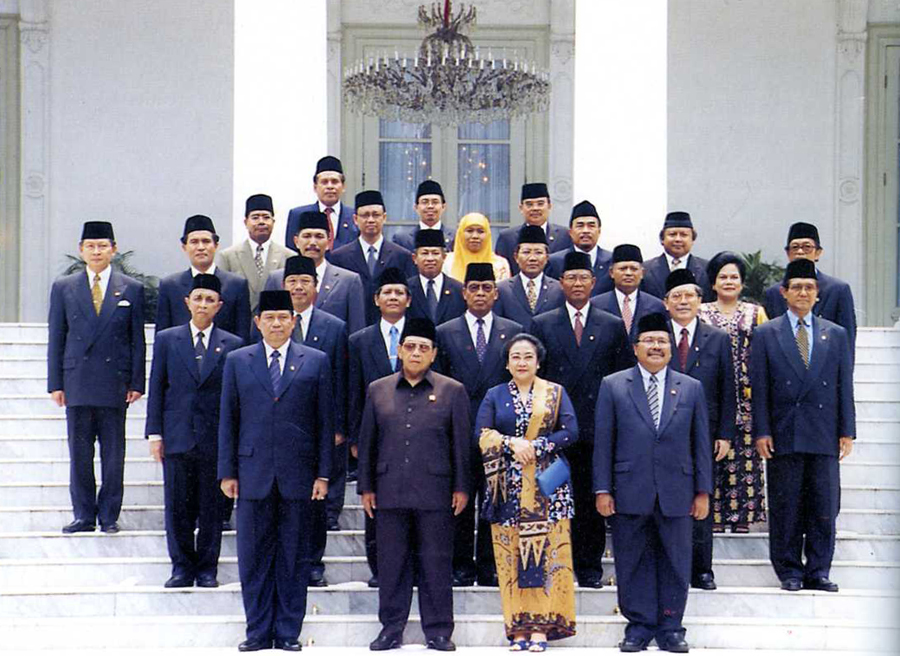
- President Abdurrahman Wahid (front row, second from the left) with the reshuffled cabinet in front of the Istana Merdeka, 23 August 2000
- Date formed: 23 August 2000
- Date dissolved: 23 July 2001

People and organisations
- President: Abdurrahman Wahid
- Vice President: Megawati Sukarnoputri
- No. of ministers: 26
- Ministers removed: 8
- Member parties: Central Axis: PKB; PPP; PAN; PKS; PBB; PDI-P; Golkar; Independent
- Status in legislature: Supermajority coalition 436 / 500
- Opposition party: PKP; PNU; PDKB (id); PDI

History
- Elections: 1999 Indonesian legislative election 1999 Indonesian presidential election
- Predecessor: National Unity Cabinet
- Successor: Mutual Assistance Cabinet

On 23 August 2000, Wahid announced an extensive reshuffle of the Cabinet. He not only moved Ministers to other positions but also removed ministers from the Cabinet and introduced new names to the Cabinet. In terms of organization, Wahid merged Ministries, changed the names of various Ministries and in some cases actually abolishing them.

=== Coordinating ministers ===
- Coordinating Minister of Politics, Social, and Security: Gen. (ret.) Susilo Bambang Yudhoyono
- Coordinating Minister of Economics, Finance, and Security: Rizal Ramli

=== Departmental ministers ===
- Minister of Home Affairs and Regional Autonomy: Lt. Gen. (ret.) Suryadi Sudirja
- Minister of Foreign Affairs: Alwi Shihab
- Minister of Defense: Mahfud MD
- Minister of Finance: Priyadi Prapto Suhardjo
- Minister of Religious Affairs: Tolchah Hasan
- Minister of Agriculture and Forestry: Bungaran Saragih
- Minister of Education: Yahya Muhaimin
- Minister of Health and Social Welfare: Achmad Sujudi
- Minister of Transportation and Telecommunications: Lt. Gen. Agum Gumelar
- Minister of Manpower and Transmigration: Al Hilal Hamdi
- Minister of Industry and Trade: Luhut Panjaitan
- Minister of Energy and Mineral Resources: Purnomo Yusgiantoro
- Minister of Justice and Human Rights: Yusril Ihza Mahendra
- Minister of Settlement and Regional Infrastructure: Erna Witoelar
- Minister of Culture and Tourism: I Gede Ardika
- Minister of Maritime Affairs and Fisheries: Sarwono Kusumaatmaja

=== State ministers ===
- State Minister of Female Empowerment/Chairwoman of Planned Families National Coordinating Body (BKKBN): Khofifah Indar Parawansa
- State Minister of Administrative Reform: Ryaas Rasyid
- State Minister of Cooperatives and Small to Medium Businesses: Zarkaish Nur
- State Minister of Environment: Soni Keraf
- State Minister of Research and Technology: A. S. Hikam

=== Junior minister ===
- Junior Minister of Forestry: Nurmahmudi Ismail
- Junior Minister of Acceleration of Development in Eastern Indonesia: Manuel Kaisiepo
- Junior Minister of National Economic Restructuring: Cacuk Sudarijanto

=== Officials with ministerial rank ===
- Commander of the Armed Forces: Admiral Widodo A. S.
- Attorney General: Marzuki Darusman

== Changes (up to June 2001) ==
- 3 January 2001: Ryaas Rasyid resigns as State Minister of Administrative Reform. He was never replaced.
- 7 February 2001: Yusril Ihza Mahendra resigns as Minister of Justice and Human Rights. He was replaced by Baharuddin Lopa.
- 15 March 2001: Nurmahmudi Ismail was replaced by Marzuki Usman as Junior Minister of Forestry.

== Second reshuffle ==
On 1 June 2001, with the situation rapidly deteriorating around him, Wahid announced another reshuffle. The changes were:

- Susilo Bambang Yudhoyono was replaced as Coordinating Minister of Politics, Social, and Security by Agum Gumelar.
- Budi Mulyawan Suyitno appointed as Minister of Transportation and Telecommunications.
- Marzuki Darusman was replaced by Baharuddin Lopa as Attorney General.
- Marsillam Simanjuntak appointed as Minister of Justice and Human Rights.
- Sarwono Kusumaatmaja was replaced as Minister of Maritime Affairs and Fisheries by Rohmin Dauri
- The Junior Ministry of National Economic Restructuring is abolished

== Third reshuffle ==
Wahid announced another reshuffle on 12 June 2001. The changes were:

- Prijadi Prapto Suhardjo was replaced by Rizal Ramli as Minister of Finance.
- Burhanuddin Abdullah appointed as Coordinating Minister of Economics, Finance, and Industry.
- Anwar Supriyadi appointed as State Minister of Administrative Reform.

== Changes ==
- 5 July 2001: Marzuki Darusman was appointed Cabinet Secretary

== Fourth reshuffle ==
Wahid announced his fourth and final reshuffle on 10 July 2001. This reshuffle was prompted by Baharuddin Lopa's death. The changes were:

- Baharuddin Lopa died and was replaced by Marsillam Simanjuntak as Attorney General.
- Mahfud was appointed Minister of Justice and Human Rights.
- Agum Gumelar was appointed Minister of Defense whilst holding the Coordinating Ministry of Politics, Social, and Security.
