= Miranda Goeltom =

Indonesian economist (born 1949)

- Miranda Swaray Goeltom as Deputy Governor of Bank Indonesia (1999)

Governor Bank Indonesia Acting
- In office May 17, 2009 – July 27, 2009
- Preceded by: Boediono
- Succeeded by: Darmin Nasution

Senior Deputy Governor of Bank Indonesia
- In office July 27, 2004 – July 27, 2009
- Governor: Burhanuddin Abdullah; Boediono
- Preceded by: Anwar Nasution
- Succeeded by: Darmin Nasution

Deputy Governor of Bank Indonesia (Note: Previously named Director of Bank Indonesia)
- In office 1997–2003
- Governor: J. Soedradjad Djiwandono; Syahril Sabirin

Personal details
- Born: Miranda Swaray Goeltom; June 19, 1949 (age 77) Jakarta, Indonesia
- Spouse(s): Erwin Siregar (1978–2003); Oloan Siahaan (m. 2003)
- Children: 2
- Education: Universitas Indonesia (S.E., Prof.); Boston University (M.B.A., Ph.D.)
- Profession: Economist

Miranda Swaray Goeltom (born June 19, 1949) Jakarta, Indonesia. is an economist who was once deputy governor, senior deputy governor of Bank Indonesia and professor Faculty of Economics, University of Indonesia.

== Education ==
He received his undergraduate education at the University of Indonesia, and obtained a Bachelor of Economics (S.E.). He then continued his master's education at the Graduate School of Economics of Boston University, majoring in political economy, and graduated with a Master of Business Administration (M.B.A.). He then continued his doctoral education at the same place, Boston University, and obtained a Ph.D.

== Carrier ==
Miranda Goeltom began her career in 1976, where she became a lecturer, course coordinator, and research staff at LPEM Faculty of Economics, University of Indonesia. In 1991, she became a consultant for the World Bank in Washington D.C. on the Investment Decision, Capital Market Imperfection project. Subsequently, Miranda returned to become a consultant for the World Bank on the Real Effect of Financial Liberalization project and a consultant for the Asian Development Bank on the Good Governance and Growth with Equity project.

Miranda taught at the management institute of the Faculty of Economics, University of Indonesia as well as at the Master of Management, Faculty of Economics, university of Indonesia in 1993. In the period 1993–1997, Miranda was chosen as Assistant Assistant Coordinating Minister for Economic Affairs, Finance, Industry, and Development Supervision.

In 1997, she was appointed as the Lead Consultant and Principal Researcher for the United States Agency for International Development (USAID) Jakarta in the Project "The Role of Women in Micro Enterprise Trade in Indonesia, With Case Studies from Jakarta, Medan, Surabaya, and Bandung." A year later in 1998, Miranda was selected as a member of the technical team for coordination and monitoring of the State Budget.

He also served as one of directors of Bank Indonesia, namely as Director of Bank Indonesia. Then, after the organizational changes at Bank Indonesia, she was appointed Deputy Governor of Bank Indonesia from 1999 to 2003.

He also ran for the Bank Indonesia Governorship election in 2003 but was defeated by Burhanuddin Abdullah and took the position of senior deputy. After Boediono ran for vice president with Susilo Bambang Yudhoyono, he took over as Acting Daily Governor of Bank Indonesia.

In 2007, Miranda Goeltom was inaugurated as a professor at the Faculty of Economics, University of Indonesia, with a scientific speech entitled "Coordination of Monetary and Fiscal Policy: Challenges and Strategies for Maintaining Macro Stability and Economic Growth to Achieve Community Welfare"

In June 2022, he was appointed as Deputy Commissioner of PT Bank Mayapada Internasional Tbk., but he only served for 5 months until November 2022.

== Controversy ==
On January 26, 2012, former Senior Deputy Governor of Bank Indonesia, Miranda S. Goeltom, was officially named a suspect in the traveler's check fraud case. Miranda had previously been named a suspect in the DGS BI traveler's check case. She was sentenced to three years in prison in the case, serving a sentence from June 1, 2012, until her release on June 1, 2015.
