= Mutual Assistance Cabinet =

Indonesian government cabinet (2001–2004)

Mutual Assistance Cabinet Kabinet Gotong Royong
- 37th Cabinet of Indonesia
- 2001–2004
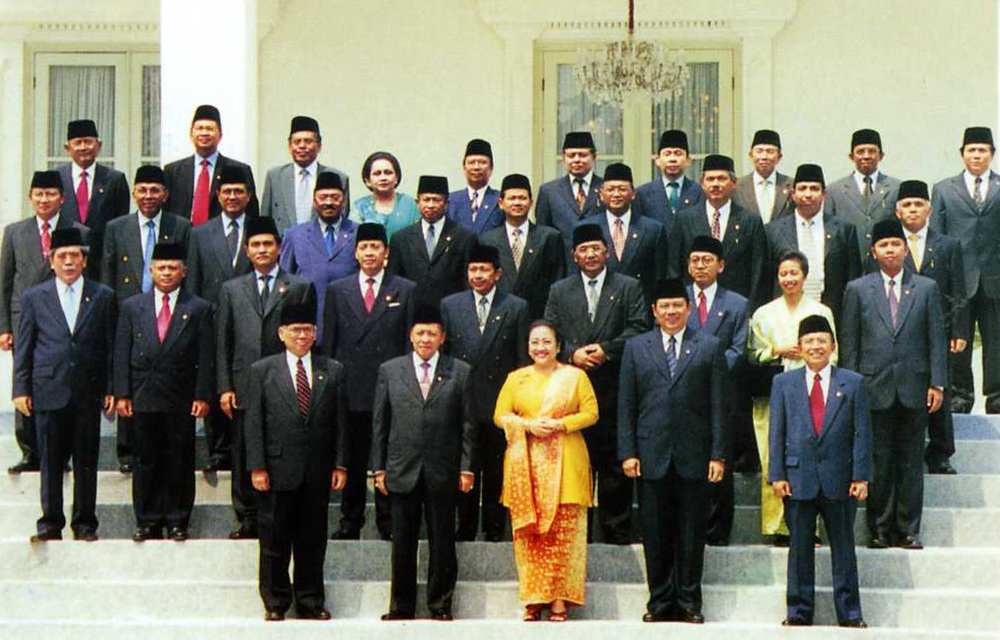
- President Megawati Sukarnoputri (front row, centre) with her newly cabinet in front of the Istana Merdeka, 10 August 2001
- Date formed: 10 August 2001
- Date dissolved: 20 October 2004

People and organisations
- President: Megawati Sukarnoputri
- Vice President: Hamzah Haz
- No. of ministers: 30
- Member parties: PDI-P; PPP; Golkar; PKB; PAN; PKS; PBB
- Status in legislature: Supermajority coalition 436 / 500

History
- Outgoing election: 2004 Indonesian presidential election 2004 Indonesian legislative election
- Predecessor: National Unity Cabinet (Reshuffle)
- Successor: United Indonesia I Cabinet

The Mutual Assistance Cabinet (Indonesian: Kabinet Gotong Royong) was the Indonesian cabinet which served under President Megawati Sukarnoputri and Vice President Hamzah Haz from 10 August 2001 until 20 October 2004. The cabinet was formed after Megawati and Hamzah were elected president and vice president at a special session of the People's Consultative Assembly in July 2001.

== Cabinet lineup ==
Lineup of the Mutual Assistance Cabinet when it was created (10 August 2001):

President	Vice President
Megawati Sukarnoputri	Hamzah Haz

Position	Portrait	Name
=== Coordinating ministers ===
Coordinating Minister of Politics and Security		Susilo Bambang Yudhoyono (until 12 March 2004)
Coordinating Minister of Politics and Security		Hari Sabarno (ad interim; since 12 March 2004)
Coordinating Minister for the Economy		Dorodjatun Kuntjoro-Jakti
Coordinating Minister for People's Welfare		Jusuf Kalla (until 19 April 2004)
Coordinating Minister for People's Welfare		Abdul Malik Fadjar (ad interim; since 22 April 2004)
=== Departmental ministers ===
Minister of Foreign Affairs		Hassan Wirajuda
Minister of Home Affairs		Hari Sabarno
Minister of Justice and Human Rights		Yusril Ihza Mahendra
Minister of Industry and Trade		Rini Soemarno
Minister of Energy and Mineral Resources		Purnomo Yusgiantoro
Minister of Finance		Boediono
Minister of Forestry		Mohamad Prakosa
Minister of Agriculture		Bungaran Saragih
Minister of Health		Achmad Sujudi
Minister of Social Affairs		Bachtiar Chamsyah
Minister of Education		Abdul Malik Fadjar
Minister of Religious Affairs		Said Agil Al Munawwar
Minister of Maritime Affairs and Fisheries		Rokhmin Dahuri
Minister of Transportation		Agum Gumelar (until 24 May 2004)
Minister of Transportation		Soenarno (ad interim; since 24 May 2004)
Minister of Manpower and Transmigration		Jacob Nuwa Wea
Minister of Culture and Tourism		I Gede Ardhika
Minister of Defense		Matori Abdul Djalil
=== State ministers ===
State Minister of Cooperatives and Small and Medium Businesses		Alimarwan Hanan
State Minister of Environment		Nabiel Makarim
State Minister of Research and Technology		Hatta Rajasa (until 29 September 2004)
State Minister of Administrative Reforms		Feisal Tamin
State Minister of Female Empowerment		Sri Redjeki Sumarjoto
State Minister of Eastern Indonesia Regional Development Acceleration		Manuel Kaisiepo
State Minister of State-Owned Enterprises		Laksamana Sukardi
State Minister of National Development Planning; Chairman of the National Development Planning Agency (Bappenas)		Kwik Kian Gie
State Minister of Communication and Information		Syamsul Mu'arif
State Minister of Settlement and Regional Infrastructure		Soenarno
=== Officials with ministerial rank ===
Attorney General		Muhammad Abdul Rachman
State Secretary/ Cabinet Secretary		Bambang Kesowo
Chief of the National Intelligence Body (BIN)		Abdullah Mahmud Hendropriyono

== Changes ==
- 11 March 2004: Susilo Bambang Yudhoyono resigned from the Cabinet, because he was running as a presidential candidate in the 2004 presidential election. Hari Sabarno took over the Coordinating Ministry of Politics and Security whilst continuing as Minister of Home Affairs.
- 19–22 April 2004: Jusuf Kalla resigned from the Cabinet at 19 April 2004, because he was running as a vice-presidential candidate in the 2004 presidential election. Malik Fadjar took over the Coordinating Ministry of People's Welfare whilst continuing as Minister of Education at 22 April 2004.
- 24 May 2004: Agum Gumelar resigned from the Cabinet, because he was running as a vice-presidential candidate in the 2004 presidential election. Soenarno took over the Ministry of Transportation whilst continuing as State Minister of Settlement and Regional Infrastructure
- 29 September: Hatta Rajasa resigned from the cabinet, because he was elected as member the People's Representative Council period 2004–2009.
