= Mohamad Prakosa =

Indonesian politician and diplomat (1960–2023)

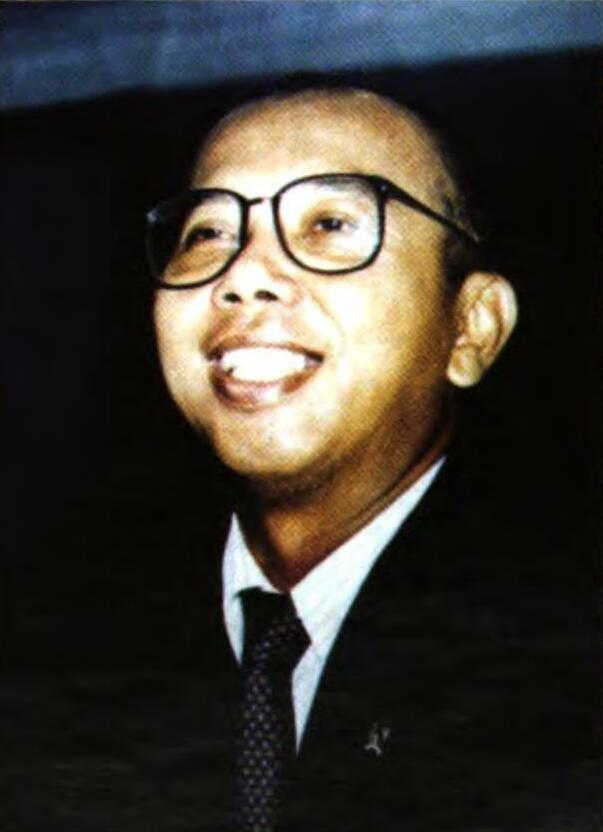
- Prakosa in 1999

Minister of Forestry
- In office 10 August 2001 – 20 October 2004
- President: Megawati Soekarnoputri
- Preceded by: Marzuki Usman
- Succeeded by: Malem Sambat Kaban

Minister of Agriculture
- In office 29 October 1999 – 23 August 2000
- President: Abdurrahman Wahid
- Preceded by: Soleh Solahudin
- Succeeded by: Bungaran Saragih

Indonesian Ambassador to Italy
- In office 18 February 2022 – 17 January 2023
- President: Joko Widodo
- Preceded by: Esti Andayani
- Succeeded by: Junimart Girsang

Member of the People's Representative Council
- In office 1 October 2009 – 17 November 2021
- Succeeded by: Harris Turino
- Constituency: Central Java IX

Personal details
- Born: 4 March 1960 Yogyakarta, Indonesia
- Died: 17 January 2023 (aged 62) Rome, Italy
- Party: Indonesian Democratic Party of Struggle
- Spouse: Sri Agustini
- Children: 3
- Education: Gadjah Mada University (BA); University of Tennessee (MA); University of California, Berkeley (PhD)

Mohamad Prakosa (4 March 1960 – 17 January 2023) was an Indonesian bureaucrat, diplomat, and politician from the Indonesian Democratic Party of Struggle (PDI-P). He was Indonesia's minister of agriculture from 1999 to 2000 and forestry from 2001 until 2004. He was then nominated by the PDI-P for a seat in the People's Representative Council and served for three terms from 2009. In 2021, Prakosa was installed as the ambassador to Italy, with concurrent accreditation to Malta, San Marino, Cyprus, FAO, IFAD, UNIDROIT, and WFP. He died on 17 January 2023, while still holding the office of ambassador.

== Early life and education ==
Prakosa was born on 4 March 1960 in Yogyakarta, as the son of a civil servant. Upon his birth, his parents moved to Abepura, a district in Jayapura, the capital of the Irian Jaya province (now Papua). He completed his primary and secondary education in the city in 1971 and 1974, respectively. He then returned to Yogyakarta and studied at the 1st Yogyakarta State High School.

Upon finishing his high school studies in 1977, Prakosa wanted to study civil engineering at the Bandung Institute of Technology. However, his parents were unable to buy him a drawing set, and Prakosa was unable to study there. He then chose to study forestry at the Gadjah Mada University. After four years, Prakosa graduated from the university with an undergraduate degree in forestry in 1982. Prakosa pursued further education in forestry during his tenure at the Department of Forestry, obtaining a graduate degree in forest economics from the University of Tennessee in 1989 and a PhD in resources economics and policy from the University of California, Berkeley, in 1994.

== Career in government ==
=== Department of Forestry and FAO ===
Prakosa started his career in the East Nusa Tenggara forest service, where he led the service's reforestation project. Two years later, in 1984, Prakosa was promoted as the head of the province's forest rehabilitation office. He moved to Jakarta in 1985 to take office as the head of project evaluation and monitoring section in the Department of Forestry. Upon finishing his doctoral studies at the University of California, Berkeley, Prakosa began to teach forestry at the University of Bengkulu. In 1996, the Food and Agriculture Organization (FAO) appointed him as the deputy representative of FAO in Indonesia. Following the departure of the FAO's representative Datok Jalil in May 1999, Prakosa became the acting representative for several months until October 1999.

=== Minister of Agriculture ===
Prakosa began his involvement in politics after the fall of Suharto in 1998. He joined the newly established Indonesian Democratic Party of Struggle under the leadership of Megawati Sukarnoputri. Megawati became vice-president under president Abdurrahman Wahid in 1999 and appointed Prakosa as agriculture minister. Under his leadership, the government began to scale down the imports of agricultural products and pushed for the integration of the agricultural sector with other sectors of production.

Prakosa oversaw some changes in personnel and structure during his short term as agriculture minister. On 22 December 1999, the directorate general of forestry was put under Prakosa's control for five days, before being returned to the Department of Forestry and Plantations. In May 2000, Prakosa restructured the department's bureaucracy by increasing the number of directorate generals and replacing several top officials.

Prakosa's policy in agriculture was criticized by agriculture observers as being too centralized and indifferent to regional needs. He denied the allegations, stating that decentralization was one of his key priorities in the department. Prakosa was dismissed from the post on 26 August 2000, allegedly for failing to handle food insecurity.

=== Minister of Forestry ===
In 2001, Megawati became president after Abdurrahman Wahid was impeached by the parliament. Megawati then appointed Prakosa as the minister of forestry in her new cabinet. At his inauguration, Prakosa pledged no immediate changes in forest policy and to focus on five key priorities in forestry: illegal logging, forest fires, reforestation, decentralization, and restructuring the forestry industry.

Of all the key priorities, Prakosa's department prioritized curbing illegal logging the most. Prakosa's department was involved in the arrest of several key members of a Malaysian illegal logging ring in Papua. However, the number of illegal logging began to rise at the end of Prakosa's term in later 2004.

== Member of parliament and ambassador ==
After his ministerial tenure ended, Prakosa became more involved in PDI-P's internal affairs. He became one of the party's chairman from 2005 to 2010 and worked as a researcher in the party's research and development agency. Prakosa was nominated as a member of the People's Representative Council from the Central Java IX electoral district. He won the election held in 2009 and was elected for a second and third term in 2014 and 2019, respectively. In August 2011, Prakosa was nominated by president Susilo Bambang Yudhoyono as ambassador to Italy, but he rejected, citing personal reasons.

During his tenure as member of parliament, Prakosa became a member of the ethics council of the People's Representative Council. In 2015, Prakosa sparked controversy amongst PDI-P members in the People's Representative Council after providing a dissenting opinion in the case of Setya Novanto, who was caught extorting shares from Freeport Indonesia. Prakosa received a sanction from Megawati and was removed from the ethics council shortly after the case became public.

In February 2021, President Joko Widodo nominated Prakosa to be the next Indonesia Ambassador to Italy. Prakosa had previously been offered a similar office during the presidency of Susilo Bambang Yudhoyono in August 2011, but he refused the offer, citing personal reasons. The People's Representative Council approved his nomination and he was sworn into office on 17 November 2021. He also held concurrent credentials to Malta, San Marino, Cyprus, FAO, IFAD, UNIDROIT, and WFP.

Despite being installed in 2021, Prakosa began presenting his credentials around early 2022. He presented his credentials to the president of Italy, Sergio Mattarella, and the president of Cyprus, Nicos Anastasiades, on 18 February 2022, and to the Director General of the Food and Agriculture Organization Qu Dongyu on 3 March 2022.

Prakosa died in Rome on the morning of 17 January 2023, at the age of 62.

== Personal life ==
Prakosa was married to Sri Agustini. The couple had two sons and a daughter.
