= Boediono =

Vice President of Indonesia from 2009 to 2014

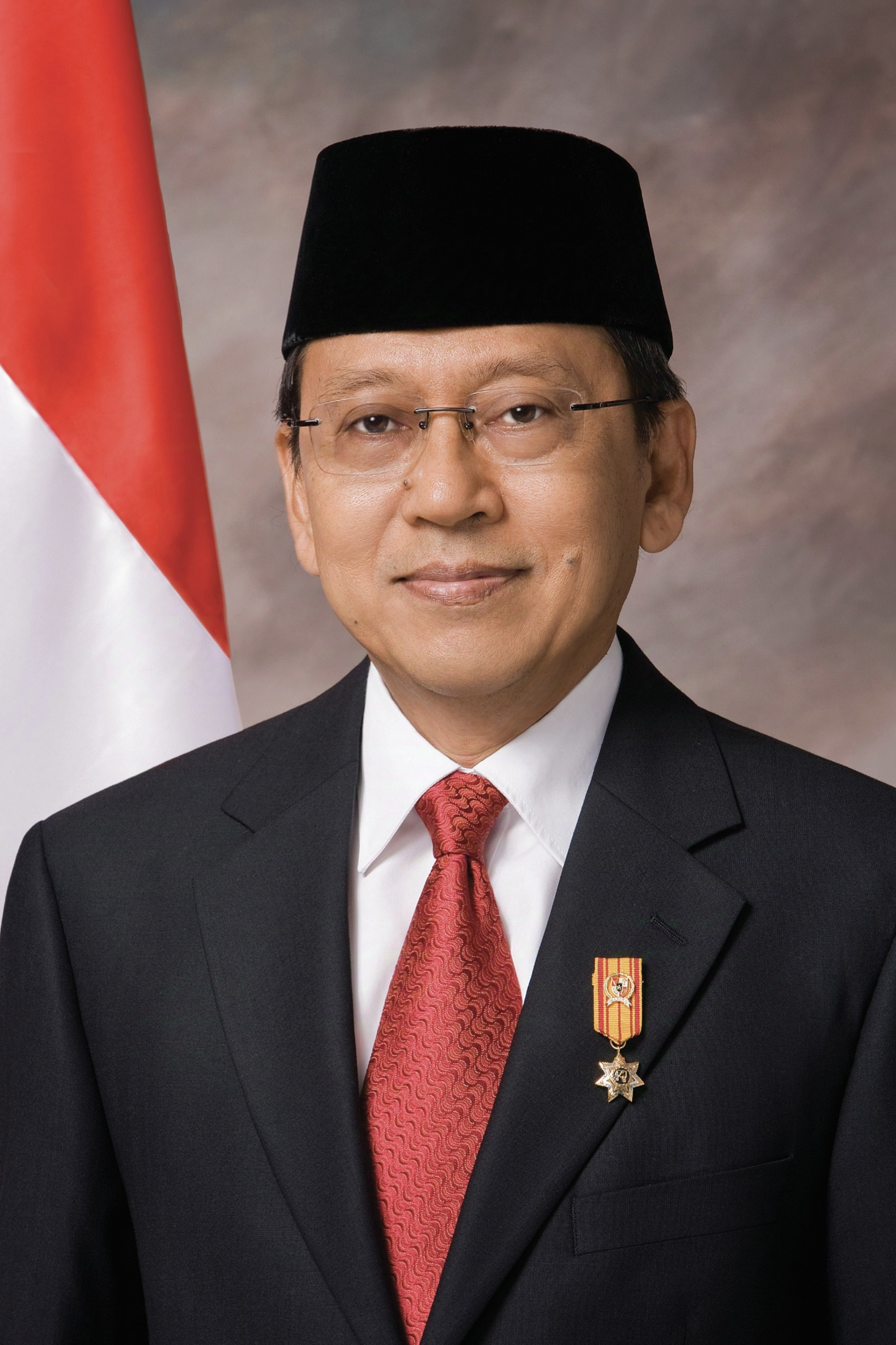
- Official portrait, 2009

11th Vice President of Indonesia
- In office 20 October 2009 – 20 October 2014
- President: Susilo Bambang Yudhoyono
- Preceded by: Jusuf Kalla
- Succeeded by: Jusuf Kalla

13th Governor of Bank Indonesia
- In office 22 May 2008 – 16 May 2009
- President: Susilo Bambang Yudhoyono
- Preceded by: Burhanuddin Abdullah
- Succeeded by: Miranda Goeltom (acting); Darmin Nasution
Ministerial posts
12th Coordinating Minister for Economic Affairs
In office 5 December 2005 – 22 May 2008
President	Susilo Bambang Yudhoyono
Preceded by	Aburizal Bakrie
Succeeded by	Sri Mulyani (acting); Hatta Rajasa
24th Minister of Finance
In office 9 August 2001 – 20 October 2004
President	Megawati Sukarnoputri
Preceded by	Rizal Ramli
Succeeded by	Jusuf Anwar
8th State Minister of National Development Planning
In office 23 May 1998 – 20 October 1999
President	B. J. Habibie
Preceded by	Ginandjar Kartasasmita
Succeeded by	Kwik Kian Gie

Personal details
- Born: 25 February 1943 (age 83) Blitar, Japanese East Indies
- Party: Independent
- Spouse: Herawati (m. 1969)
- Education: University of Gadjah Mada; University of Western Australia; Monash University; University of Pennsylvania (Wharton School)
- Occupation: Politician; economist

Boediono (EYD: Budiono, pronounced [budiˈjono]; born 25 February 1943) is an Indonesian politician and economist who served as the 11th vice president of Indonesia from 2009 to 2014. He had previously been Governor of the Indonesian Central Bank and a professor of economics at Gadjah Mada University.

== Education ==
Boediono received his early education in primary school in Blitar, East Java. In the early 1960s, he began university studies at Gadjah Mada University in Yogyakarta before winning a scholarship to study at the University of Western Australia in Perth. In 1967 he graduated from the University of Western Australia with an economics degree and continued his studies for a master's degree in economics at Monash University in Melbourne which he completed in 1972. Later, he undertook further studies toward his doctorate from the Wharton School of the University of Pennsylvania which he completed in 1979. He also worked in the Indonesia Project at the Australian National University in the early 1970s as a research assistant in economics.

Boediono was listed as one of the Wharton School's 125 Influential People and Ideas in 2007 and was dubbed "Indonesia's financial rudder".

== Career ==
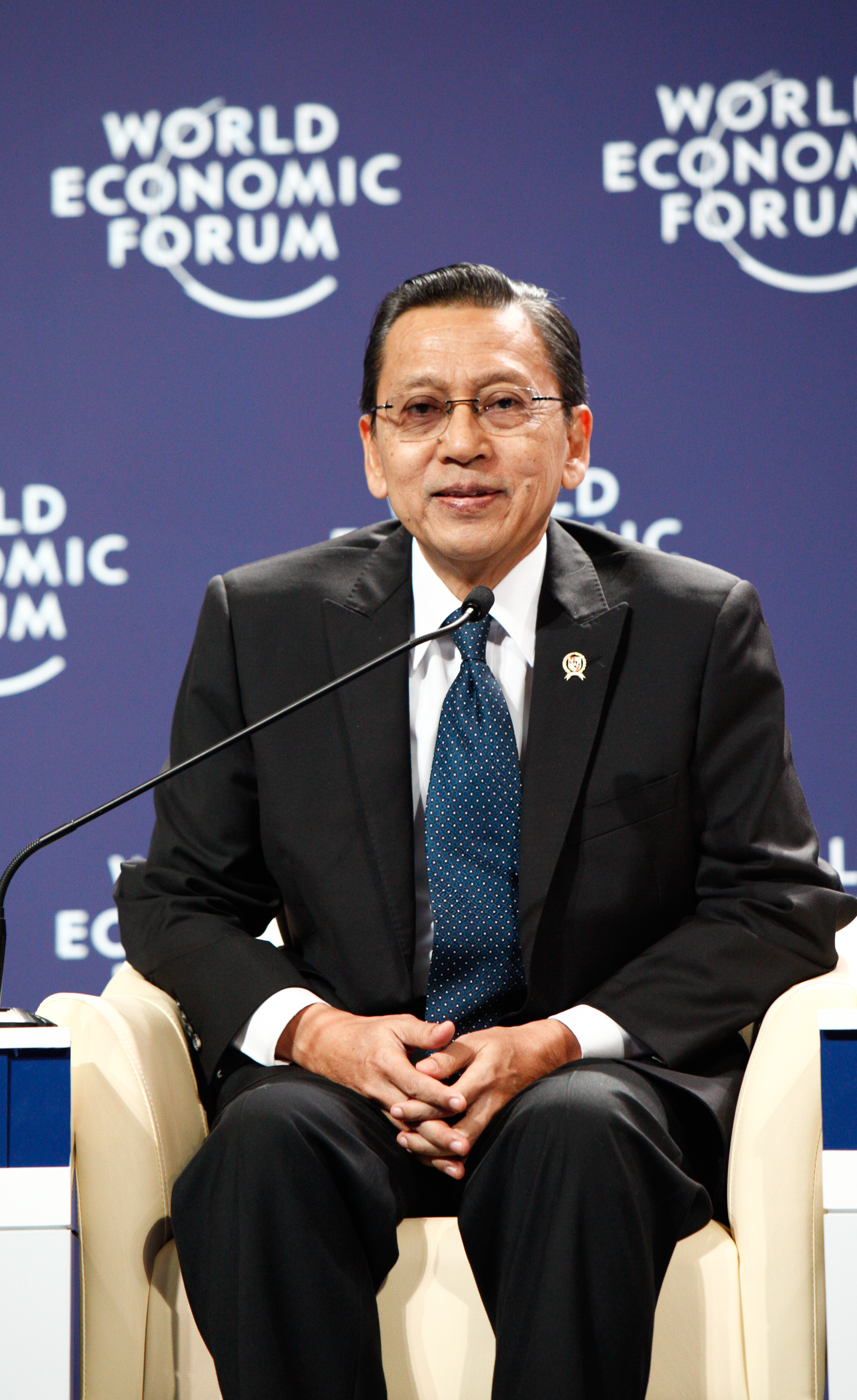
Boediono at the 2011 World Economic Forum

Boediono was a Bank of Indonesia deputy governor in charge of fiscal monetary policy from 1997 to 1998 and served as State Minister of National Planning and Development from 1998 to October 1999.

Following the removal of Abdurrahman Wahid from the presidency in 2001, President Megawati Sukarnoputri appointed Boediono as Minister of Finance in her new administration. Under his leadership, the economy grew by 4% in 2002.

President Susilo Bambang Yudhoyono appointed Boediono as Coordinating Minister for the Economy during his first cabinet reshuffle in 2005, replacing Aburizal Bakrie. Bakrie had come under suspicion for having conflicts of interest. In 2008, a commission of the People's Representative Council elected Boediono Governor of the Indonesian central bank, Bank Indonesia. After he was selected by Yudhoyono as a running mate in the 2009 presidential election, Boediono submitted his resignation from the central bank post.

Boediono is also a professor of economics at Gadjah Mada University where he has taught various courses on macroeconomics and monetary policy since the early 1970s.

== Publications ==
Since he was appointed a staff member in the Faculty of Economics, Gadjah Mada University, in the early 1970s, Boediono has lectured and published widely on topics relating to contemporary issues of economic policy in Indonesia. His publications include the following:

- Boediono. 2009. Ekonomi Indonesia, mau ke mana? Kumpulan esai ekonomi (The economy of Indonesia, Where to? A collection of economic essays), PT Gramedia, Jakarta. ISBN 978-979-9101-89-1
- Boediono. 2007. 'Primus Inter Pares', Chapter 11 in Moh. Arsjad Anwar, Aris Ananta, Ari Kuncoro (eds), Kesan Para Sahabat tentang Widjojo Nitisastro (Testimonials of Friends about Widjojo Nitisastro), Penerbit Buku Kompas, Jakarta.
- Boediono, 2005. 'Professor Mubyarto, 1938–2005', Bulletin of Indonesian Economic Studies, 41 (2).
- Boediono. 2005. 'Managing the Indonesian economy: some lessons from the past', Bulletin of Indonesian Economic Studies, 41 (3).
- Boediono. 2004. 'Kebijakan fiskal: sekarang dan selanjutnya' (Fiscal policy: now and in the future), in Subiyantoro, Heru and Riphat Singgih (eds), Kebijakan fiskal (Fiscal policy), Penerbit Buku Kompas, Jakarta.
- Boediono. 2002. 'The IMF support program in Indonesia: comparing its implementation under three presidents', Bulletin of Indonesian Economic Studies, 38 (3).
- Boediono. 1999. 'Addressing the social impacts', speech delivered to the meeting on Development cooperation: responding to the Asian crisis, Sydney, 5 March.
- Boediono and T. Kaneko. 1998. 'Price changes', in S. Ichimura (ed.), Indonesian economic development: Issues and analysis, Japanese International Cooperation Agency, Tokyo.
- Boediono. 1990. 'Fiscal policy in Indonesia'. Paper presented to the second convention of the East Asian Economic Association, Bandung.
- Boediono and Mari Pangestu (1986). 'The structure and causes of manufacturing sector protection in Indonesia', in Christopher Findlay and Ross Garnaut (eds.), The political economy of manufacturing protection: experience of ASEAN and Australia, Allen and Unwin, Australia.
- Boediono. 1985. 'Demand for Money in Indonesia, 1975 - 1984', Bulletin of Indonesian Economic Studies, 21 (2).
- Boediono. 1974. 'An economic survey of D.I Aceh',Bulletin of Indonesian Economic Studies, 10 (2).
- Boediono. 1972. 'An economic survey of North Sulawesi', Bulletin of Indonesian Economic Studies, 8 (3).

== Honorary degrees ==
Boediono has received honorary degrees from the three Australian universities which he studied and worked between the early 1960s and 1970s.

In 2011 he was awarded an honorary doctorate from the University of West Australia in Perth. In February 2013 in a ceremony in Jakarta attended by the president of Indonesia and a delegation from Monash University led by the Vice-Chancellor of the university, he was awarded an honorary Doctor of Laws from Monash University. And in November 2013 he was awarded an honorary doctorate from the Australian National University in Canberra.

== Decorations ==
As the vice president of Indonesia, Boediono is automatically bestowed the highest class of six out of seven civilian Star Decorations (Indonesian: Tanda Kehormatan Bintang), namely:

- Star of the Republic of Indonesia, 2nd Class (Indonesian: Bintang Republik Indonesia Adipradana)
- Star of Mahaputera, 1st Class (Indonesian: Bintang Mahaputera Adipurna)
- Star of Merit, 1st Class (Indonesian: Bintang Jasa Utama)
- Star of Humanity (Indonesian: Bintang Kemanusiaan)
- Star of Democracy Upholder, 1st Class (Indonesian: Bintang Penegak Demokrasi Utama)
- Star of Culture Parama Dharma (Indonesian: Bintang Budaya Parama Dharma)
- Star of Bhayangkara, 1st Class (Indonesian: Bintang Bhayangkara Utama)

== See also ==
- List of vice presidents of Indonesia

Political offices
Preceded by Jusuf Kalla	Vice President of Indonesia; 20 October 2009 – 20 October 2014	Succeeded by Jusuf Kalla
Preceded by Aburizal Bakrie	Coordinating Minister for Economic Affairs; 2005–2008	Succeeded by Sri Mulyani (acting); Hatta Rajasa
Preceded by Rizal Ramli	Minister of Finance; 2001–2004	Succeeded by Jusuf Anwar
Preceded by Ginandjar Kartasasmita	State Minister of National Development Planning; 1998–1999	Vacant Title next held by Kwik Kian Gie
Government offices
Preceded by Burhanuddin Abdullah	Governor of Bank Indonesia; 2008–2009	Succeeded by Miranda Goeltom (acting); Darmin Nasution
