= Rizal Ramli =

Indonesian politician and economist (1954–2024)

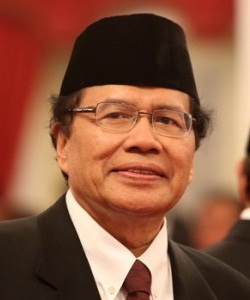
- Ramli in 2015

4th Coordinating Minister for Maritime Affairs
- In office 12 August 2015 – 27 July 2016
- President: Joko Widodo
- Preceded by: Indroyono Soesilo
- Succeeded by: Luhut Binsar Pandjaitan

29th Minister of Finance
- In office 12 June 2001 – 9 August 2001
- President: Abdurrahman Wahid
- Preceded by: Prijadi Praptosuhardjo
- Succeeded by: Boediono

8th Coordinating Minister for Economic Affairs
- In office 23 August 2000 – 12 June 2001
- President: Abdurrahman Wahid
- Preceded by: Kwik Kian Gie
- Succeeded by: Burhanuddin Abdullah

6th Chairman of Bulog
- In office March 2000 – 19 February 2001
- President: Abdurrahman Wahid
- Preceded by: Jusuf Kalla
- Succeeded by: Widjanarko Puspoyo

Personal details
- Born: 10 December 1954 Padang, West Sumatra, Indonesia
- Died: 2 January 2024 (aged 69) Jakarta, Indonesia
- Resting place: Jeruk Purut Cemetery
- Spouses: Herawati Moelyono (m. 1982; died 2006) Marijani (Liu Siaw Fung) (m. 2008; died 2011)
- Children: 3
- Education: Bandung Institute of Technology (Ir.); Sophia University (M.A.); Boston University (Ph.D.)

Rizal Ramli (10 December 1954 – 2 January 2024) was an Indonesian politician, economist, and student activist. Ramli served as Coordinating Minister for Maritime Affairs under President Joko Widodo's Working Cabinet. He also served under President Abdurrahman Wahid's administration as Chair of the Indonesian Bureau of Logistics (Bulog), Coordinating Minister of the Economy, Finance and Industry also Minister of Finance in the National Unity Cabinet.

On the international stage, Ramli was trusted to serve on the economic advisory panels of the UN. Ramli's name was also put forward as the Secretary-General of the Economic & Social Commission of Asia and Pacific (ESCAP), but in order to focus on serving Indonesia he refused the nomination.

After a while out of the circle of power, in August 2015, Ramli was requested by President Joko Widodo to serve the country in charge of planning, coordinating as well as synchronizing policies in maritime affairs. Even in government, his critical attitude did not change. Rizal frequently threw scathing criticism (which he termed as kepret) towards something he deemed not in line with national interests, the source of the nickname "Rajawali Ngepret".

== Early life, education, activism and professional career ==
=== Early life ===
Rizal Ramli and his parents were from Padang. He was forced to move in with his grandmother Kasina Rachman in Bogor, West Java when he was seven, due to the death of his parents. His father, Ramli, was an assistant district officer. His mother, Rabiah (d. 1960), was a teacher. At the age of three, Ramli was already able to read. And for that, he said, he was thankful to his mother who taught and guided him at all times to learn the letters.

=== Education and activism ===
Ramli finished high school in Bogor. After graduating, he was accepted into the Institute of Technology Bandung (ITB), where he studied Engineering Physics. He had to work at a printing press in Kebayoran Baru, South Jakarta for six months to pay for the tuition fees. He also made use of his English skills and worked as a translator to pay his school fees at ITB. At ITB, he was appointed as the President of the Student English Forum (SEF) and then Vice President of the Dewan Mahasiswa (Student Council).

As Vice President of ITB's Student Council in 1977, he was also involved in activism. Ramli and three of his friends were the authors of the "White Book". In the book, he wrote many criticisms against the system of authoritarian rule by the Indonesian government under the Suharto regime. The White Book also explores the practice of corruption, collusion, and nepotism in the government, particularly by the family of President Suharto. Although the White Book was eventually banned on campus, copies were circulated in Java. The popularity also received media attention at that time. The book was then translated into eight languages by Ben Anderson, a scholar from Cornell University, USA. One of the first critics of Soeharto in Indonesia at that time, Ramli was jailed for six months in 1978.

Ramli continued his education, finishing his Master of Arts in Asian Studies at Sophia University, Japan. He then graduated from Boston University with a Ph.D. degree in economics in 1990.

=== Professional career ===
On his return from the United States, after he finished his doctorate, he founded the ECONIT Advisory Group, an independent economic think-tank, with a few other economists such as Laksamana Sukardi, Arif Arryman, and M. S. Zulkarnaen. Ramli and his team were very critical of the New Order government's economic policies, particularly those with little emphasis on public and national interests, such as the national car policy, urea-tablet fertilizer, Freeport mining, etc. Ramli, through the ECONIT Advisory Group, published a report titled "1997: The Year of Uncertainty" which predicted the Asian financial crisis. He based his forecast on three points: private sector debt, current account deficit, and the overvalued Rupiah. With a few of his colleagues, he also founded the Indonesia Awakening Commission (Komite Bangkit Indonesia/KBI) and also served as its chairman.

== Personal life ==
Ramli was first married to Herawati M. Mulyono and has had a son, Dipo Satria Ramli (b. 19 August 1984), and two daughters, Dhitta Puti Saraswati (b. 17 August 1983) and Daisy Orlana Ramli (b. 7 January 1992). He later remarried to Maryani, also known as Xiaw Fung, until her death at Pondok Indah Hospital in South Jakarta, on 1 March 2011 due to cancer at the age of 47. Dipo is married to Dina Arumsari and has had a daughter, Anabel Asmara Ramli, and a son, Anakin Lazuardi Ramli. While Dhitta and Daisy is married to Fandra Febriand and Daniel Kirschen, respectively.

== Political career and policies ==
=== Chairman of Indonesian Bureau of Logistics (Bulog) ===
Ramli was appointed head of the Indonesian Bureau of Logistics (Bulog) by President Abdurrahman Wahid in March 2000. He was the chairman of Bulog for less than a year (15 months) but he was regarded by some as making notable breakthroughs that increased Bulog's economic value in just six months. Some of the important policies implemented by Ramli during this period are:

- Introducing steps to improve Bulog's performance and taking steps to reform it into a more transparent and accountable institution, such as transforming off-budget accounts of Bulog to on-budget ones;
- Significant cost savings and efficiencies in the operation of the agency. As a result, Bulog had a surplus on its account;
- Simplified and consolidated Bulog's accounts from 117 to only nine accounts;
- Undertake restructuring to prepare Bulog for its transition of status towards Perusahaan Umum (Perum); and
- Carry out rotations of Bulog officials by switching the appointments between those posted in 'wet' positions and the ones posted in 'dry' positions.

Another notable policy regarding rice price that Ramli implemented is to increase the direct purchase of rice grains from farmers. The reason being that rice grains are more easily stored and long-lasting than milled rice. This particular policy of direct purchase is to reduce the meddling of middlemen that used to buy the rice grains from farmers and combine them with imported rice and then resell it to Bulog. The increased direct purchase of rice grains benefited the farmers by absorbing the rice grain supply upon harvesting season with an optimum price floor. During times of famine, Bulog's rice grain supply is released and milled in the villages to prevent increases in the prices of rice. Ramli's time as Bulog head was also marked by an import ban of rice by the bureau, while those in the private sector can still import with a tariff. These policies ensured the stable and low price of rice under the Wahid administration.

=== Coordinating Minister of the Economy, Finance and Industry ===
Ramli was appointed Coordinating Minister of the Economy, Finance, and Industry on 23 August 2000, replacing Kwik Kian Gie. He then announced his 10 Program for the Acceleration of Economic Recovery (10 Program Percepatan Pemulihan Ekonomi). This program includes policies such as:

- Create stability in the financial sector;
- Improve people's welfare in rural areas to strengthen socio-political stability;
- Spur the development of Micro, Small and Medium Enterprises (MSME);
- Improve farmers' productivity and welfare;
- Prioritize investment-based economic recovery instead of a loan based recovery;
- Drive the increase in exports;
- Perform value-added privatization;
- Carry out economic decentralization while keeping fiscal balance in check;
- Optimize the utilization of natural resources; and
- Speed up the restructuring of the banking sector.

In May 2001, he also made another breakthrough by pushing for the abolition of cross-ownership and cross-management between PT Telkom and PT Indosat. This move was intended to increase competition and push both national telecommunication operators towards becoming full-service operators. Through this innovation, many parties considered that the steps Ramli had taken were the right steps so that they could provide benefits for the country. Ramli also saved the State Electricity Company or Perusahaan Listrik Negara (PLN) from bankruptcy without injecting funds instead by way of asset revaluation, so that the capital from minus 9 trillion rupiahs jumped to a surplus of 119.4 trillion rupiahs.

=== Minister of Finance ===
President Wahid shifted Ramli to his new post as Minister of Finance on 12 June 2001. During the transition period between President Wahid and President Megawati Sukarnoputri, who officially took office on 23 July 2001, Ramli briefly served until 9 August 2001, before being replaced by Boediono.

=== President Commissioner of State Owned Enterprise (SOE) ===
Ramli was also trusted several times as President Commissioner of State-Owned Enterprises, among them at PT. Semen Gresik and BNI. While serving as the president commissioner at those state-owned enterprises, Ramli continued to criticize government policies which he disapproves of, both during the reign of President Susilo Bambang Yudhoyono and the administration of President Joko Widodo.

In 2007, he contributed in making PT. Semen Gresik one of the seven most profitable SOEs in Indonesia by increasing its net profit from IDR 1.3 trillion to IDR 1.8 trillion.

Not even six months in office, he resigned from the position of President Commissioner of BNI after being officially appointed Coordinating Minister for Maritime Affairs in August 2015.

=== Coordinating Minister for Maritime Affairs ===
As a result of the Working Cabinet's reshuffle, Ramli was appointed Coordinating Minister for Maritime Affairs on 12 August 2015. He confessed that at first he hesitated to accept the offer by President Widodo, for his basic expertise lies in economics.

After a day in office, with the approval of President Widodo, Ramli proposed the name change for his ministry, to the Coordinating Ministry for Maritime Affairs and Resources with two more additional ministries coordinated under it, the Ministry of Public Works and Housing and Ministry of Agriculture. The legal basis for the name change and addition of ministries are still being assessed by the Cabinet Secretariat of the Republic of Indonesia.

== International activities ==
As a Boston University alumni economist, Ramli also had an international social network. He is one of the few Indonesian economists that have been trusted to serve as the UN's economic advisor with other renowned international economists such as the economics Nobel laureate Amartya Sen of Harvard University, and two other Nobel laureates, Sir James Alexander Mirrleess of the UK and Rajendra K. Pachauri among others.

In June 2012 at the United Nations' Second Advisory Panel Meeting, Ramli brought forward six paper topics, namely Prospect for the Economy and Democracy in Indonesia, Post Yudhoyono Indonesia, and Asian Power, Indonesia Strategic Economic & Political Outlook and Asian Powers, Indonesia's Economic Outlook and Asian Economic Integration, Indonesian Democracy at The Cross Road, and Indonesian Economy and Rule of Law under SBY Administration. As in the first panel meeting, this second meeting was also attended by members of the UN's expert staff and selected experts from various countries.

== Controversies ==
Not long after being appointed Coordinating Minister for Maritime Affairs, Ramli issued a statement that invited public controversy. He proposed the cancellation of plans by the Ministry of State-Owned Enterprises to purchase new planes for Garuda Indonesia. According to Ramli, the plan to buy new planes is an improper policy and a waste of state funds. A few days later, Ramli also criticized the 35,000-Megawatt electricity development project that he deemed unrealistic and said that the plan is Vice President Jusuf Kalla's ambitious yet unrealized project. The scathing critique immediately drew a harsh reaction from the vice president and some other government officials. These controversies created quite a stir inside the Jokowi-JK administration.

Many parties criticized him and said that the comments and critique Ramli issued were unethical and only serve to create a rift inside the cabinet that is trying hard to overcome the economic woes of the time. However, there are plenty who agree with Ramli, and consider him to be making issues more transparent.

In 2018, Ramli declared his intention to run for president in the 2019 Presidential Election. He also issued an election promise: if elected president, he would arrest 100 bad people on his first day in office. Those bad people would be sent to Malaria Island in Central Indonesia.

== Death ==
Ramli died at Dr. Cipto Mangunkusumo Hospital in Central Jakarta, on 2 January 2024, due to pancreatic cancer at the age of 69. His death was confirmed by his staff, Tri Wibowo Santoso. According to his family representative, Yosef Sampurna Nggarang, he will be buried at Jeruk Purut Cemetery on 4 January.
