= Burhanuddin Abdullah =

Indonesian economist

Burhanudddin Abdullah
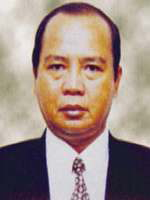
- Burhanuddin as Governor of Bank Indonesia, 2003

12th Governor of Bank Indonesia
- In office 17 May 2003 – 17 May 2008
- President: Megawati Soekarnoputri; Susilo Bambang Yudhoyono
- Preceded by: Syahril Sabirin
- Succeeded by: Boediono

9th Coordinating Minister for Economics, Finance and Industry
- In office 12 June 2001 – 9 August 2001
- President: Abdurrahman Wahid
- Preceded by: Rizal Ramli
- Succeeded by: Dorodjatun Kuntjoro-Jakti

Personal details
- Born: 10 July 1947 (age 79) Garut, West Java, Indonesia
- Party: Gerindra
- Spouse: Ike Juliawati
- Education: Padjadjaran University; Michigan State University
- Occupation: Economist

Burhanuddin Abdullah (born 10 July 1947) is a former Governor of Bank Indonesia, in office from 2003 to 2008. Previously, he served as Coordinating Minister for Economics, Finance and Industry from June to August 2001. He was convicted of corruption in 2008.

== Education ==
Burhanuddin had been a student at Padjadjaran University in Bandung where he graduated with a degree in agriculture in 1974. He later studied at Michigan State University in the United States graduating with a Master of Arts (MA) in economics in 1984.

== Early career ==
Burhanuddin joined Bank Indonesia in the late 1970s and held a number of positions in the organization.

- 1979 Staff member, Management of General Credit.
- 1984 Staff member, General Economics Section, Management of Research and Statistics.
- 1986 Staff, Governor of Bank Indonesia.
- 1991 Alternative Executive Director, IMF, for the Southeast Asia Group (Indonesia, Brunei Darussalam, Fiji, Lao PDR, Malaysia, Myanmar, Nepal, Singapore, Thailand, Tonga, and Viet Nam), Washington, D.C.
- 1994 Head, International Trade and Economic Cooperation Section, External Affairs, Bank Indonesia.
- 1995 Deputy Head, External Affairs, Bank Indonesia.
- 1996 Deputy Head, Monetary and Economic Research, Bank Indonesia.
- 1998 Director, External Affairs Directorate, Bank Indonesia.
- 2000 Deputy Governor, Bank Indonesia.

== Ministerial appointment ==
Before being appointed Governor of Bank Indonesia, Burhanuddin had held senior economic positions in government in Indonesia. He had briefly been Coordinating Minister of Economics, Finance and Industry in the National Unity Cabinet led by President Abdurrahman Wahid between 12 June 2001 and 9 August 2001. He later became the Chair of the Indonesian Economic Scholars Association (Ikatan Sarjana Ekonomi Indonesia).

Burhanuddin's appointment as Governor of Bank Indonesia was approved by the Indonesian parliament after he had been nominated as a candidate for the position by President Megawati Sukarnoputri in early 2003. President Megawati nominated three people for the parliament to consider, the other two candidates being Miranda Goeltom and Cyrillus Harinowo, both senior managers in Bank Indonesia.

== Later developments ==
In April 2008, Burhanuddin was arrested for alleged involvement in the misuse of Bank Indonesia funds and subsequently sentenced to five years in jail for his role in the management of the funds. He was released from jail in March 2010 after serving two years of his sentence. After his release, Burhanuddin was active in community affairs, giving lectures on policy and management issues to professional organisations and in universities in Indonesia.

Government offices
Preceded by Syahril Sabirin	Governor of Bank Indonesia; 2003–2008	Succeeded by Boediono
Political offices
Preceded by Rizal Ramli	Coordinating Minister for Economics, Finance and Industry; June 2001–August 2001	Succeeded by Dorodjatun Kuntjoro-Jakti
