= Dipo Satria Ramli =

Indonesian economist (born 1984)

Dipo Satria Ramli (born 19 August 1984 ) is an economist living in Jakarta, Indonesia. Dipo previously served as director of Macquarie Group Indonesia.

== Career ==
Dipo served as the director of PT Macquarie Capital Securities Indonesia. He founded DANAdidik, a startup fintech to fund education for the students. He also served as Chief Operating Officer (COO) at PT Mayar Kernel Supernova.

As an economist at the University of Indonesia, Dipo is actively involved in research related to fiscal and monetary policy, and the dynamics of corporate governance and capital markets

== Publication ==
Dipo actively writes about economic issues in several media, including:

- Debt switching and the complex dynamics of BI's independence (Jakarta Post)
- Danantara: Opportunity or Threat for Indonesian SOEs? (Tribunnews)
- Is a state-owned company superholding really necessary or is it just a show-off? (The Conversation)

== Early life ==
Dipo is the son of renowned Indonesian economist Rizal Ramli and Herawati M. Mulyono. Dipo was the only son of the couple's three children. He led the funeral prayer for his father, Rizal Ramli, in January 2024.

Currently, he is pursuing a PhD in Economics at the Faculty of Economics and Business, University of Indonesia.

== Education ==
- SMA Negeri 34 Jakarta
- Computer Science and Applied Mathematics, University at Albany, United States, 2003–2005
- Master Business Administration (MB) A, IE Business School, Spain, 2009–2010
- Doctor of Economics, University of Indonesia, Indonesia, 2024–now
