= Dorodjatun Kuntjoro-Jakti =

Indonesian politician

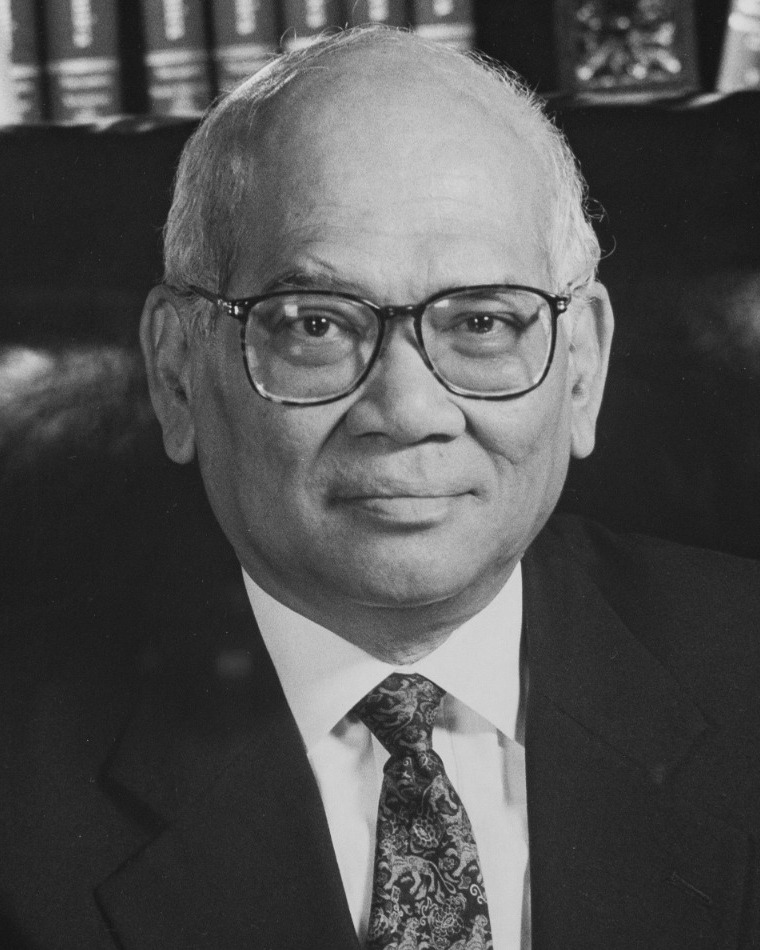

10th Coordinating Ministry for Economic Affairs
- In office 10 August 2001 – 20 October 2004
- President: Megawati Soekarnoputri
- Preceded by: Burhanuddin Abdullah
- Succeeded by: Aburizal Bakrie

Personal details
- Born: 25 November 1939 (age 86) Rangkasbitung, Banten, Dutch East Indies
- Education: University of California, Berkeley
- Occupation: Politician

Dorodjatun Kuntjoro-Jakti (born 25 November 1939) was the Coordinating Minister for Economy and Finance in Indonesia in the Mutual Assistance Cabinet during the Megawati Sukarnoputri administration of 2001–2004.

Kuntjoro-Jakti was born in Rangkasbitung, Banten. He graduated with a Ph.D. in political science from the University of California, Berkeley in 1980.

He was the ambassador of Indonesia to the United States.
