= I Gede Ardhika =

Indonesian politician (1945–2021)

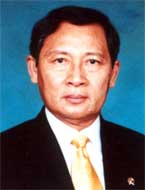
- A picture of I Gede Ardika

Minister of Culture and Tourism
- In office 23 August 2000 – 20 October 2004
- President: Abdurrahman Wahid; Megawati Soekarnoputri
- Preceded by: Hidayat Jaelani
- Succeeded by: Jero Wacik

Personal details
- Born: 15 February 1945 Padalarang, West Java, Japanese Occupation Period
- Died: 20 February 2021 (aged 76)
- Education: STIA LAN

I Gede Ardhika (15 February 1945 – 20 February 2021) was an Indonesian politician, who served as the Minister for Culture and Tourism in Indonesia from 2000 to 2004.

He died four days after his 76th birthday from COVID-19.
