= Coordinating Ministry for Economic Affairs =

Indonesian government ministry

- Kementerian Koordinator Bidang Perekonomian
- National emblem of Indonesia

Ministry overview
- Formed: 25 July 1966
- Jurisdiction: Government of Indonesia
- Headquarters: Ali Wardhana Building Jalan Lapangan Banteng Timur No. 2-4 Central Jakarta 10710 Jakarta, Indonesia
- Minister responsible: Airlangga Hartarto, Coordinating Minister
- Website: www.ekon.go.id

The Coordinating Ministry for Economic Affairs (Note: Indonesian: Kementerian Koordinator Bidang Perekonomian.) is an Indonesian government ministry in charge of planning and policy coordination, as well as synchronization of policies in the field of economics. The ministry is led by a Coordinating Minister, which is currently held by Airlangga Hartarto since 23 October 2019.

== Organization ==
Based on the Presidential Decree No. 143/2024 and as expanded by the Coordinating Minister for Economic Affairs Decree No. 15/2024, the Coordinating Ministry for Economic Affairs is organized into the following:

- Office of the Coordinating Minister for Economic Affairs
- Office of the Deputy Coordinating Minister for Economic Affairs
- Coordinating Ministry Secretariat
  - Bureau of Performance Management and Partnerships
  - Bureau of Legal Affairs and Organization
  - Bureau of Communication and Information Services
  - Bureau of General Affairs and Human Resources
- Deputy for Management and Businesses Development of State-Owned Enterprises Coordination (Deputy I)
  - Deputy I Secretariat
  - Assistant Deputy for State-Owned Enterprise Development in Tourism and Telecommunication
  - Assistant Deputy for State-Owned Enterprise Development in Energy and Mineral Resources
  - Assistant Deputy for State-Owned Enterprise Development in Manufacturing Industries, Agro-industries, Pharmaceuticals, and Health
  - Assistant Deputy for State-Owned Enterprise Development in Infrastructures and Logistics
  - Assistant Deputy for State-Owned Enterprise Development in Financial Services and Businesses
- Deputy for Economical and Investment Partnership Coordination (Deputy II)
  - Deputy II Secretariat
  - Assistant Deputy for Bilateral Economical Partnership
  - Assistant Deputy for Regional Economical Partnership
  - Assistant Deputy for Multilateral Economical Partnership
  - Assistant Deputy for Investment and Downstreaming Acceleration
  - Assistant Deputy for Macroeconomy and Fiscal Affairs
- Deputy for Trade and Digital Economy Coordination (Deputy III)
  - Deputy III Secretariat
  - Assistant Deputy for Domestic Trade, Consumer Protection, and Trade Order
  - Assistant Deputy for Trade Facilitation and Export Development
  - Assistant Deputy for National Logistic Development
  - Assistant Deputy for Digital Economy Development
  - Assistant Deputy for Financial Inclusion Improvement
- Deputy for Energy and Mineral Resources Coordination (Deputy IV)
  - Deputy IV Secretariat
  - Assistant Deputy for Oil and Gas Development
  - Assistant Deputy for Mineral and Coal Development
  - Assistant Deputy for Electricity Development and Geology
  - Assistant Deputy for Energy Transition Acceleration
  - Assistant Deputy for Mining Industry Downstreaming Development
- Deputy for Industry, Manpower, and Tourism Coordination (Deputy V)
  - Deputy V Secretariat
  - Assistant Deputy for Agro, Chemical, Pharmaceuticals, and Textile Industries Development
  - Assistant Deputy for Metal, Machinery, Transportation, Electronics Industries Development and Varieties
  - Assistant Deputy for Improvement of Productivity and Manpower Ecosystem Development
  - Assistant Deputy for Economic Area and Strategic Projects Development
  - Assistant Deputy for Tourism Development
- Board of Experts
  - Senior Expert to the Minister on Regulations, Law Enforcements, and Economic Resilience
  - Senior Expert to the Minister on Connectivity and Service Development
  - Senior Expert to the Minister on Regional Development
  - Senior Expert to the Minister on Productivity and Economic Competitive Development

== Coordinated agencies ==
Based on the Presidential Decree No. 143/2024, these ministries are placed under the coordinating ministry:

- Ministry of Manpower
- Ministry of Industry
- Ministry of Trade
- Ministry of Energy and Mineral Resources
- Ministry of State Owned Enterprises
- Ministry of Investment and Downstream Industry
- Ministry of Tourism

== Minister ==
Coordinating Minister for Economic Affairs and their forerunner is listed below.

No.	Portrait	Minister	Took office	Left office	Time in office	Party	Cabinet
1	Hamengkubuwono IX	Hamengkubuwono IX (12 April 1912–2 October 1988); Deputy Prime Minister for Economics, Finance & Development (1966); Chief Minister of Economics & Finance (1966–1967); State Minister of Economics, Finance, & Industry (1967–1973)	28 March 1966	8 March 1973	6 years, 345 days	Independent	Dwikora III (28 March 1966 – 25 July 1966); Ampera I (28 July 1966 – 11 October 1967); Ampera II (17 October 1967 – 10 June 1968); Development I (10 June 1968 – 8 March 1973)
2	Widjojo Nitisastro	Widjojo Nitisastro (23 September 1927–9 March 2012); Coordinating Minister for Economics, Finance and Industry	28 March 1973	19 March 1983	9 years, 356 days	Independent	Development II (28 March 1973 – 31 March 1978); Development III (31 March 1978 – 19 March 1983)
3	Ali Wardhana	Ali Wardhana (6 June 1928–14 September 2015); Coordinating Minister for Economics, Finance, Industry and Development Supervision	19 March 1983	21 March 1988	5 years, 2 days	Golkar	Development IV (19 March 1983 – 21 March 1988)
4	Radius Prawiro	Radius Prawiro (29 June 1928–26 May 2005); Coordinating Minister for Economics, Finance, Industry and Development Supervision	23 March 1988	17 March 1993	4 years, 359 days	Golkar	Development V (23 March 1988 – 17 March 1993)
5	Saleh Afiff	Saleh Afiff (31 October 1930–28 June 2005); Coordinating Minister for Economics, Finance, Industry and Development Supervision	17 March 1993	14 March 1998	4 years, 362 days	Golkar	Development VI (17 March 1993 – 14 March 1998)
6	Ginandjar Kartasasmita	Ginandjar Kartasasmita (born 9 April 1941); Coordinating Minister for Economics, Finance and Industry	14 March 1998	27 September 1999	1 year, 197 days	Golkar	Development VII (14 March 1998 – 21 May 1998); Development Reform (23 May 1998 – 20 October 1999)
—	Hartarto Sastrosoenarto	Hartarto Sastrosoenarto (30 May 1932–15 May 2017); Acting; Coordinating Minister for Economics, Finance and Industry	1 October 1999	20 October 1999	19 days	Independent	Development Reform (23 May 1998 – 20 October 1999)
7	Kwik Kian Gie	Kwik Kian Gie (11 January 1935–28 July 2025); Coordinating Minister for Economic Affairs	26 October 1999	23 August 2000	302 days	PDI-P	National Unity (26 October 1999 – 9 August 2001)
8	Rizal Ramli	Rizal Ramli (10 December 1954–2 January 2024); Coordinating Minister for Economic Affairs	23 August 2000	12 June 2001	293 days	Independent	National Unity (26 October 1999 – 9 August 2001)
9	Burhanuddin Abdullah	Burhanuddin Abdullah (born 10 July 1947); Coordinating Minister for Economic Affairs	12 June 2001	9 August 2001	58 days	Independent	National Unity (26 October 1999 – 9 August 2001)
10	Dorodjatun Kuntjoro-Jakti	Dorodjatun Kuntjoro-Jakti (born 23 November 1939); Coordinating Minister for Economic Affairs	9 August 2001	20 October 2004	3 years, 72 days	Independent	Mutual Assistance (9 August 2001 – 20 October 2004)
11	Aburizal Bakrie	Aburizal Bakrie (born 15 November 1946); Coordinating Minister for Economic Affairs	21 October 2004	5 December 2005	1 year, 45 days	Golkar	United Indonesia (21 October 2004 – 20 October 2009)
12	Boediono	Boediono (born 25 February 1943); Coordinating Minister for Economic Affairs	5 December 2005	18 May 2008	2 years, 165 days	Independent	United Indonesia (21 October 2004 – 20 October 2009)
—	Sri Mulyani Indrawati	Sri Mulyani Indrawati (born 26 August 1962); Acting; Coordinating Minister for Economic Affairs	13 June 2008	20 October 2009	1 year, 129 days	Independent	United Indonesia (21 October 2004 – 20 October 2009)
13	Hatta Rajasa	Hatta Rajasa (born 18 December 1953); Coordinating Minister for Economic Affairs	22 October 2009	13 May 2014	4 years, 203 days	PAN	United Indonesia II (22 October 2009 – 20 October 2014)
14	Chairul Tanjung	Chairul Tanjung (born 16 June 1962); Coordinating Minister for Economic Affairs	19 May 2014	20 October 2014	154 days	Independent	United Indonesia II (22 October 2009 – 20 October 2014)
15	Sofyan Djalil	Sofyan Djalil (born 23 September 1953); Coordinating Minister for Economic Affairs	27 October 2014	12 August 2015	289 days	Independent	Working (27 October 2014 – 20 October 2019)
16	Darmin Nasution	Darmin Nasution (born 21 December 1948); Coordinating Minister for Economic Affairs	12 August 2015	20 October 2019	4 years, 69 days	Independent	Working (12 August 2015 – 20 October 2019)
17	Airlangga Hartarto	Airlangga Hartarto (born 1 October 1962); Coordinating Minister for Economic Affairs	23 October 2019	Incumbent	6 years, 303 days	Golkar	Onward Indonesia (since 23 October 2019)
