= Kwik Kian Gie =

Indonesian economist and politician (1935–2025)

- 郭建義
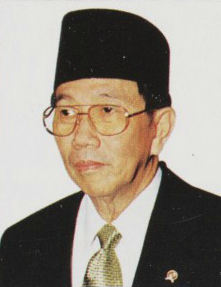
- Official portrait, 1999

Minister of National Development Planning
- In office 10 August 2001 – 20 October 2004
- President: Megawati Sukarnoputri
- Preceded by: Office established (Note: The position of State Minister for National Development Planning was briefly abolished in 1999 during the Wahid administration, in which Bappenas was declared a non-departmental government agency. It was only restored in 2001 during the Megawati administration)
- Succeeded by: Sri Mulyani

Coordinating Minister for Economic Affairs
- In office 26 October 1999 – 23 August 2000
- President: Abdurrahman Wahid
- Preceded by: Ginandjar Kartasasmita
- Succeeded by: Rizal Ramli

Deputy Speakers of the People's Consultative Assembly
- In office 3 October 1999 – 26 October 1999
- President: Abdurrahman Wahid
- Speaker: Amien Rais
- Succeeded by: Soetjipto Soedjono

Personal details
- Born: Kwik Kian Gie; 11 January 1935 Juwana, Pati, Dutch East Indies
- Died: 28 July 2025 (aged 90) Jakarta, Indonesia
- Party: PDI-P
- Spouse(s): Dirkje Johanna de Widt (died 2020)
- Children: 3
- Education: University of Indonesia; Erasmus University Rotterdam
- Occupation: Economist, politician

Kwik Kian Gie (Chinese: 郭建義; pinyin: Guō Jiànyì; Pe̍h-ōe-jī: Koeh Kiàn-gī; 11 January 1935 – 28 July 2025) was an Indonesian economist and politician who served as the Coordinating Minister for Economic Affairs from 1999 to 2000, the Minister of National Development Planning from 2001 to 2004, as well as briefly serving as the Deputy Speaker of the People's Consultative Assembly in 1999. He was a prominent Indonesian economist who often wrote columns in the newspaper Kompas criticizing the policies of the Suharto administration in the late 1980s and 1990s.

== Early life ==
Following working in a teaching post in the Economics Department in the University of Indonesia, he undertook further studies in the Nederlandse Economische Hogeschool (currently Erasmus University Rotterdam) in Rotterdam, the Netherlands.

Life in the Netherlands did indeed bring big changes to Kwik's personal life. He went to the Netherlands alone, but when he returned to Indonesia Kwik brought three people with him. They were Dirkje Johanna de Widt (his wife from Rotterdam), and his two children Kwik Ing Hie and Kwik Mu Lan. Of his three children, only the youngest, Kwik Ing Lan, was born in Indonesia.

== Career ==
After a few years working in the Netherlands following his graduation he returned to Indonesia and held several executive positions and became a businessman. He maintained a strong interest in politics and education, and said to the press that, "I now have enough money to pay for anything I can wish for," and with that started his involvement with the PDI-P opposition political party of Megawati Sukarnoputri.

He also founded Institut Bisnis & Informatika Indonesia (IBII) which is now known as Kwik Kian Gie School of Business, a business and management school in Indonesia, with his colleagues.

== Candidacy ==
During the rise of Megawati Sukarnoputri he was mentioned as a possible candidate for the important post of Coordinating Minister of Economics and Finance. He was appointed to the position by Abdurrahman Wahid in the Wahid Cabinet in October 1999. However, various political hurdles prevented him from making much progress during his term in office. He was later moved to the position of Minister of National Development and Planning. His period as minister was seen by some as a disappointment.

== Death ==
Kwik died Jakarta, Indonesia on 28 July 2025, at the age of 90.
