= Syahril Sabirin =

Indonesian economist (born 1943)

Syahril Sabirin (born 14 October 1943 in Bukittinggi, West Sumatra) served as the Governor of Bank Indonesia from 1999 to 2003, succeeding Soedrajad Djiwandono.

Before joining Bank Indonesia, Syahril studied at Gadjah Mada University in Yogyakarta, graduating with an economics degree from the Faculty of Economics in the university.

In 2000 he was arrested in a fraud scandal surrounding Bank Bali. Sabirin had initially been sentenced to three years in prison in 2002, a sentence which the Supreme Court reduced to two years in 2009.

Government offices
Preceded by J. Soedradjad Djiwandono	Governor of Bank Indonesia; 1999 - 2003	Succeeded by Burhanuddin Abdullah
