= Marzuki Usman =

Economist

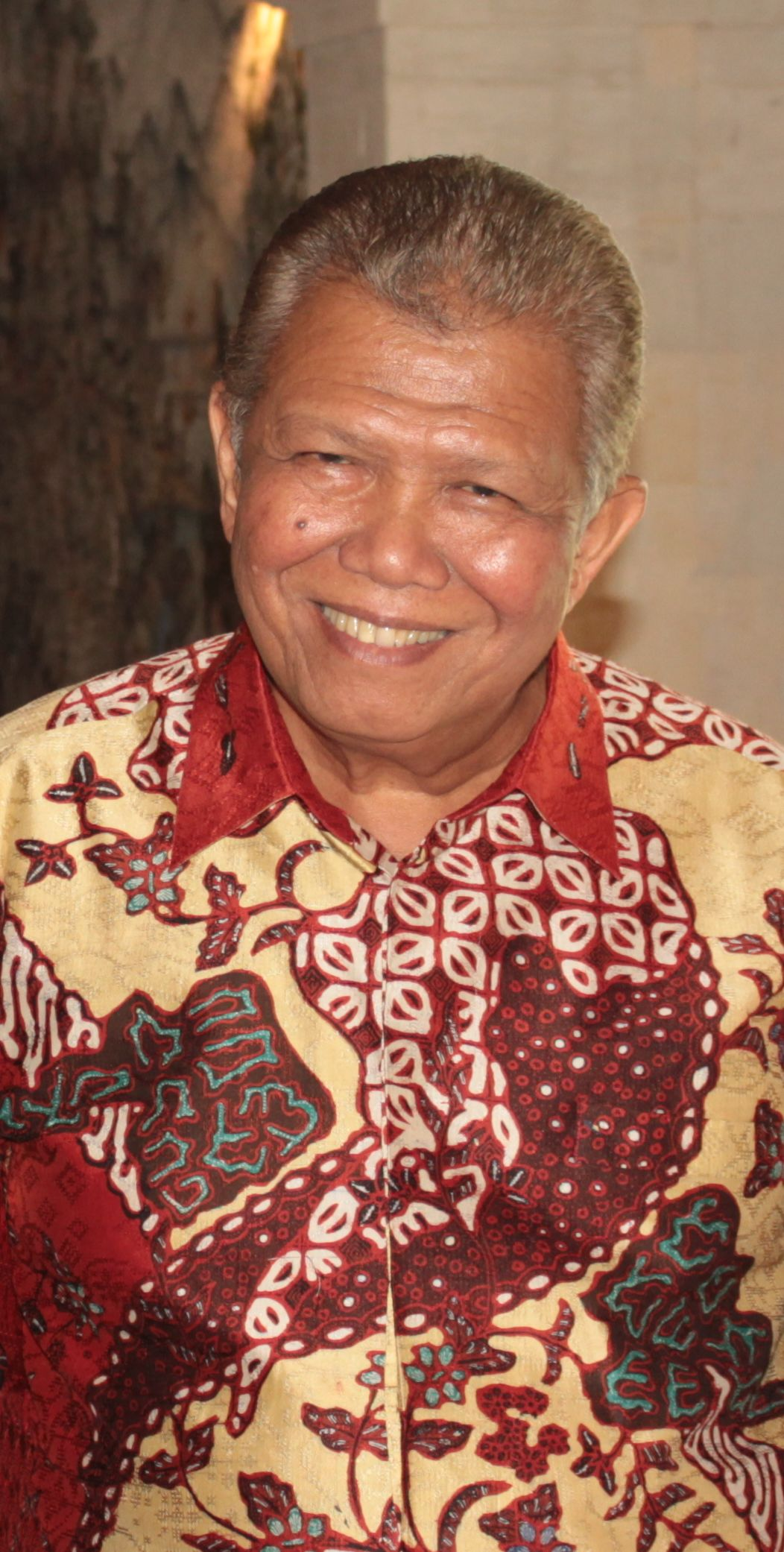
Marzuki Usman at the Mentor MicroBank Signing, 12 November 2013

Marzuki Usman (born 30 December 1943 in Mersam, Batanghari, Jambi) is an economist and expert on capital markets. He also served as Minister of Tourism, Post and Telecommunications (Development Reform Cabinet) and the Minister of Forestry and Plantation (Cabinet of National Unity). He is the current chairman of the Jakarta Stock Exchange and serves in several roles in a politically non-partisan capacity.

== Early life and education ==
Usman Initially intended to study dentistry, but found he did not have the disposition when he failed the entrance exam for a dental school in the Philippines, and subsequently applied to the Faculty of Economics at Gadjah Mada University, Yogyakarta. He graduated in 1969 with an economics degree specializing in Money and Banking. Usman was employed by the Indonesian government until, encouraged by Indonesian economists, Johannes Baptista Sumarlin and Prof. Dr. Ali Ward, Usman won a scholarship from the Ford Foundation to study at Duke University, Durham, North Carolina, where he earned a Master of Arts in economics in 1975.

== Career ==
Usman was employed by the Indonesian Ministry of Finance in the department of the Directorate General of Finance in 1969. His continued employment within various ministerial departments led him to later become 'Director of Investment and State Property' and 'Director of the Institute of Finance and Accounting'.

He was the head of the Capital Markets Management Agency (predecessor of Financial Services Authority), within the Ministry of Finance from 1988 to 1992 and the head of Education and Training Finance (IRB), also within the Ministry of Finance, from 1991 to 1995. While he became head of the Capital Market Executive Agency, he introduced reforms and new practices. He was the creator and regulator of capital market instruments which enabled rapid growth and an increase in transaction speeds.

In 1993 he was appointed as the commissioner of the Jakarta Stock Exchange (BEJ BEJ) and in 1996 he became the head of Monetary and Financial Analysis, again for the Ministry of Finance.

Under Indonesia's Third President, B. J. Habibie, Usman served as Minister of Tourism, Arts and Culture (Men Parsenibud), from 1998 to 1999. In 1999 he was appointed Minister of State for Investment / Head of the Investment Coordinating Board (BKPM) and in 2001 Ministry of Forestry.

== Current activities and responsibilities ==
- Founder of The Association for Human Rights Reporting Standards (FIHRRST)
- Serves as Chairman of Mazars advisory board Asia Pacific
- President Commissaries of PT. Bekasi Fajar Industrial Estate, Tbk
- President Commissaries of PTPN VI
- Board of Commissaries of AIA Assurance
- Board of Commissaries of PT. Cahaya Pelangi Persada
- President Commissaries of PT. Restorasi Habitat Orangutan Indonesia (RHOI) from 2010
- President Commissaries of PT. Citra Borneo Indah from August 2011
- Commissaries of PT. Cipaganti group, since October 2011
- Chairman of steering committee of ISEA (Indonesian Senior Executive Association)
- Chairman of ECAII (Economic Association of Indonesia and India)
- Advisory board member of DISC (Duke University Islamic Study Center)
- Deputy Chairman of PT Lippo E-Net, Tbk
- Deputy of Steering Committee for IPMI (Indonesian Management Development Institute)
- 2013 Co-founder Mentor MicroBank Foundation to encourage Indonesians to improve personal finances to start or improve business investments.

== Mentor MicroBank Foundation ==
On 12 November 2013, Usman co-founded the Bali-based Mentor MicroBank Foundation which aims to further the economic prosperity of Indonesians who wish to start or improve small businesses.

Mentor MicroBank Foundation differs to usual micro lending schemes in that it provides pre and post grant mentoring and oversight from experienced and successful business people.

== FIHRRST ==
Usman is one of the founders of The Association for Human Rights Reporting Standards, an international association dedicated to the respect, protection and fulfilment of human rights. The organization, which was co-founded by a group of human rights advocates including Marzuki Darusman, H.S. Dillon, Makarim Wibisono, James Kallman, Dradjad Hari Wibowo, develops and promotes standards by which adherence to human rights principles can be demonstrated.
