= Megawati Sukarnoputri =

President of Indonesia from 2001 to 2004

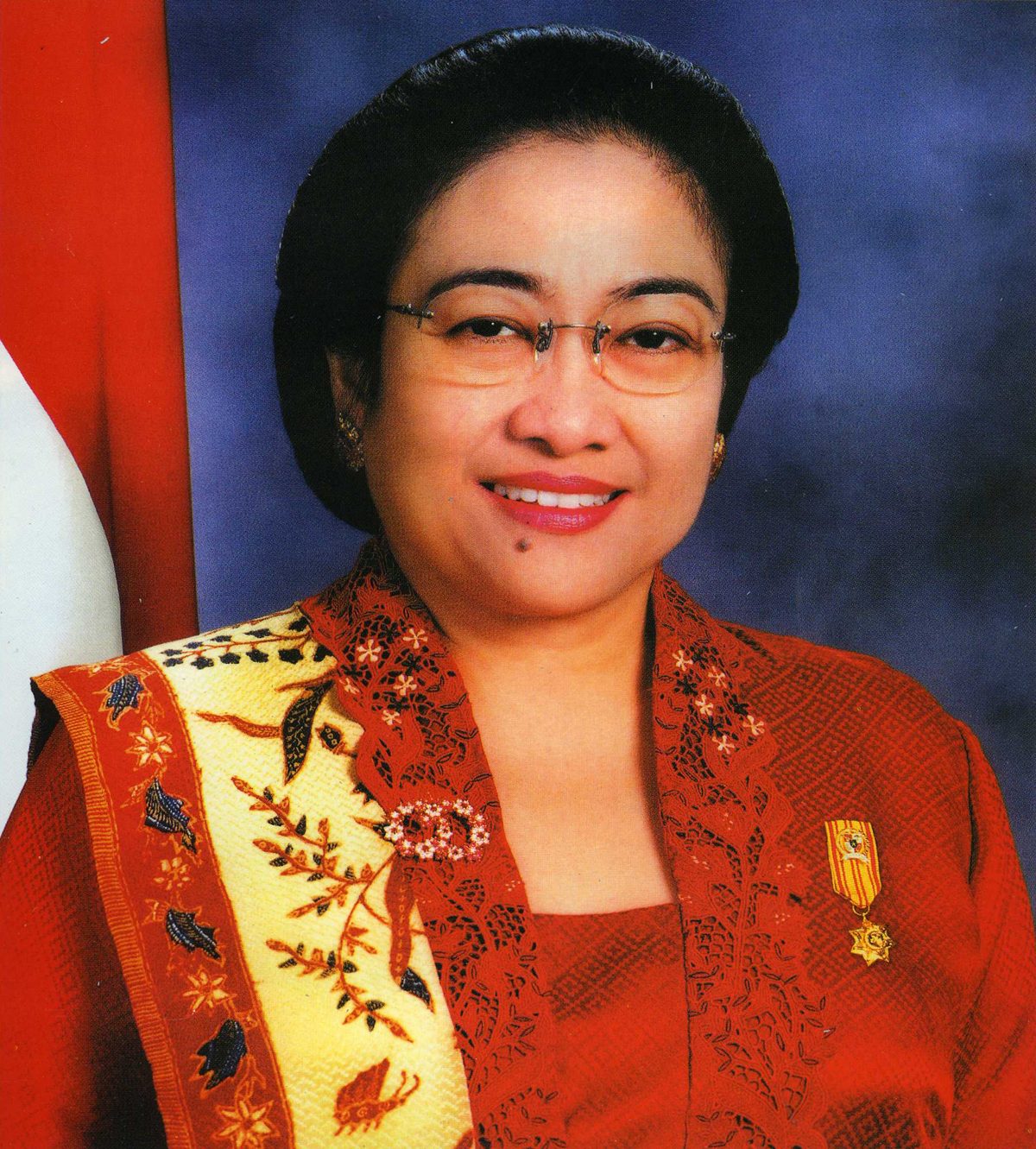
- Official portrait, 2001

5th President of Indonesia
- In office 23 July 2001 – 20 October 2004
- Vice President: Hamzah Haz
- Preceded by: Abdurrahman Wahid
- Succeeded by: Susilo Bambang Yudhoyono

8th Vice President of Indonesia
- In office 21 October 1999 – 23 July 2001
- President: Abdurrahman Wahid
- Preceded by: B. J. Habibie (1998)
- Succeeded by: Hamzah Haz

Member of House of Representatives
- In office 1 October 1999 – 21 October 1999
- Succeeded by: Dwi Ria Latifa
- Constituency: West Java
- In office 1 October 1987 – 30 September 1997
- Constituency: Central Java

General Chairwoman of Indonesian Democratic Party of Struggle
- Incumbent
- Assumed office 15 February 1999
- Preceded by: Position established

General Chairwoman of Indonesian Democratic Party
- In office 22 January 1993 – 27 July 1996
- Preceded by: Suryadi
- Succeeded by: Suryadi
Government offices
Chairperson of BRIN Steering Committee
Incumbent
Assumed office 5 May 2021
Preceded by	Position established
Chairperson of BPIP Steering Committee
Incumbent
Assumed office 28 February 2018
Preceded by	Herself (as Head of UKP-PIP)

Personal details
- Born: Diah Permata Megawati Setiawati Sukarnoputri; 23 January 1947 (age 79) Yogyakarta, Indonesia
- Party: PDI-P (since 1999)
- Other political affiliations: PDI (1986–1996)
- Height: 158 cm (5 ft 2 in)
- Spouses: Surindro Supjarso (m. 1968; died 1970); Hassan Gamal Ahmad Hassan (m. 1972; ann. 1972); Taufiq Kiemas (m. 1973; died 2013)
- Children: 3, including Puan Maharani
- Parents: Sukarno (father); Fatmawati (mother)
- Relatives: Rukmini Sukarno (half-sister); Franklin Kline (brother-in-law)
- Occupation: Politician; legislator
- Nickname: Mega
- Megawati Sukarnoputri's voice Megawati's address prior to a meeting with George W. Bush in the White House after the September 11 attacks Recorded 19 September 2001

Diah Permata Megawati Setiawati Sukarnoputri (Indonesian: [meɡawati sukarnɔputri]; born 23 January 1947) is an Indonesian politician who served as the fifth president of Indonesia from 2001 to 2004 and the eighth vice president under President Abdurrahman Wahid from 1999 to 2001. She is Indonesia's first and only female president to date, and also the first president born in Indonesia after its independence.

Megawati Sukarnoputri became president in 2001 when Abdurrahman Wahid was impeached and removed from office. She ran for re-election in the 2004 presidential election, but was defeated by Susilo Bambang Yudhoyono. She ran again against Yudhoyono in the 2009 presidential election, and was defeated a second time. She is the first and current leader of the Indonesian Democratic Party of Struggle (PDI-P), one of Indonesia's largest political parties. She is the eldest daughter of Indonesia's first president, Sukarno.

== Name ==
Megawati's last name (Sukarnoputri, meaning "daughter of Sukarno") is a patronym, not a family name. Javanese often do not have family names, similarly Minang living outside of traditional nagari society often do not carry on matrilineal clan names. She is often referred to as simply Megawati or Mega, derived from Sanskrit meaning 'cloud goddess.' In a speech to the students of the Sri Sathya Sai Primary School, she mentioned that Indian politician Biju Patnaik named her at Sukarno's request.

== Early life and education ==
=== Early life and family ===
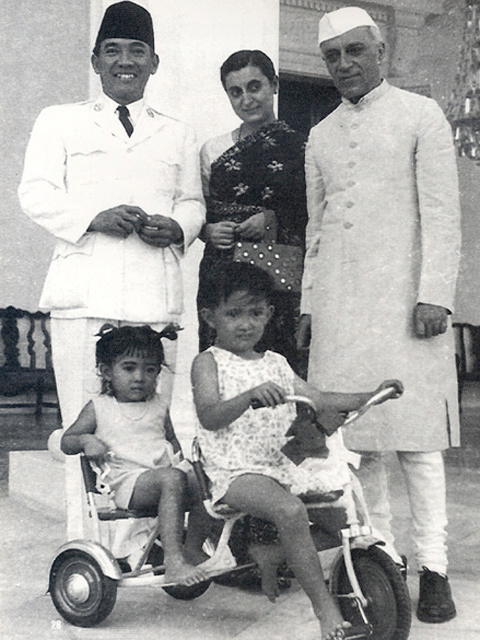
President Sukarno, with his children Megawati and Guntur, while receiving Indian prime minister Jawaharlal Nehru and his daughter Indira Gandhi

Megawati Sukarnoputri was born in Yogyakarta to Sukarno and his wife Fatmawati. Sukarno had declared Indonesia's independence from the Netherlands 2 years prior in 1945. Fatmawati, a Minang descended from Inderapura aristocracy, was one of his nine wives. Megawati Sukarnoputri was Sukarno's second child and eldest daughter. She grew up in her father's Merdeka Palace. She danced for her father's guests and developed a gardening hobby. Megawati Sukarnoputri was 19 when her father relinquished power in 1966 and was succeeded by a government which eventually came to be led by President Suharto.

=== Education ===
Megawati Sukarnoputri attended Universitas Padjadjaran in Bandung to study agriculture but dropped out in 1967 to be with her father following his fall. In 1970, the year her father died, Megawati Sukarnoputri went to the Universitas Indonesia to study psychology but dropped out after two years.

== Political career ==
=== Member of parliament ===
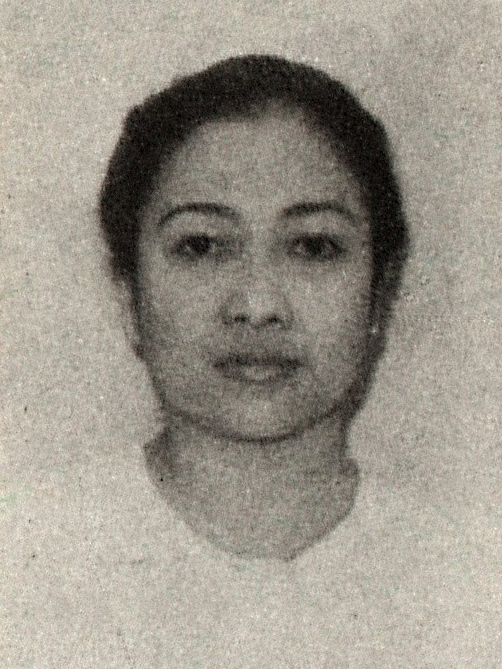
Megawati Sukarnoputri as a member of the People's Representative Council in 1987

In 1986, Suharto gave the status of Proclamation Hero to Sukarno in a ceremony attended by Megawati Sukarnoputri. Suharto's acknowledgment enabled the Indonesian Democratic Party (PDI), a government-sanctioned party, to campaign on the common Sukarno nostalgia in the lead-up to the 1987 legislative elections. Up to that time, Megawati Sukarnoputri had seen herself as a housewife, but in 1987 she joined PDI and ran for a People's Representative Council (DPR) seat. The PDI accepted Megawati Sukarnoputri to boost their own image. Megawati Sukarnoputri quickly became popular, her status as Sukarno's daughter offsetting her lack of oratorical skills. Although PDI came last in the elections, Megawati Sukarnoputri was elected to the DPR. Like all members of the DPR she also became a member of the People's Consultative Assembly (MPR).

=== Indonesian Democratic Party chair ===
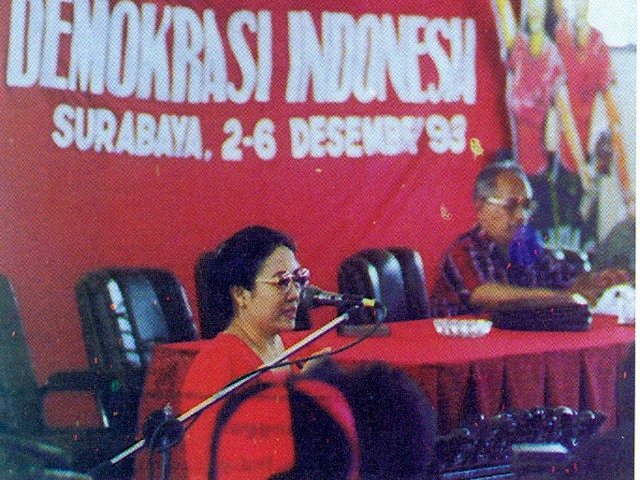
Megawati Soekarnoputri at the National Congress of the Indonesian Democratic Party in December 1993

Megawati Sukarnoputri was not reelected, but continued as a PDI member. In December 1993, the PDI held a national congress. As was always the case when New Order opposition parties held their congresses, the government actively interfered. As the Congress approached, three individuals contended for the PDI chair. The incumbent, Suryadi, had become critical of the government. The second was Budi Harjono a government-friendly figure whom the government backed. The third was Megawati Sukarnoputri. Her candidacy received such overwhelming support that her election at the Congress became a formality.

When the congress assembled, the government stalled and delayed attempts to hold the election. The congress faced a deadline when their permit to assemble would run out. As the hours ticked down to the end of the congress, troops began gathering. With only two hours remaining, Megawati Sukarnoputri called a press conference, stating that because she enjoyed the support of a majority of PDI members, she was now the de facto chair. Despite her relative lack of political experience, she was popular in part for her status as Sukarno's daughter and because she was seen as free of corruption with admirable personal qualities. Under her leadership, PDI gained a large following among the urban poor and both urban and rural middle classes.

=== Split in the party ===
The government was outraged at its failure to prevent Megawati's rise. They never acknowledged Megawati Sukarnoputri although her self-appointment was ratified in 1994. In 1996, the government convened a special national congress in Medan that reelected Suryadi as chair. Megawati Sukarnoputri and her camp refused to acknowledge the results and the PDI divided into pro-Megawati and anti-Megawati camps.

==== 27 July 1996 incident ====
Suryadi began threatening to take back PDI's Headquarters in Jakarta. This threat was carried out on the morning of 27 July 1996. Suryadi's supporters (reportedly with the government's backing) attacked PDI Headquarters and faced resistance from Megawati Sukarnoputri supporters stationed there. In the ensuing fight, Megawati's supporters held on to the headquarters. A riot ensued, followed by a government crackdown. The government later blamed the riots on the People's Democratic Party (PRD), and continued to recognize Suryadi's faction as the official party.

==== 1997 legislative election ====
Despite what seemed to be a political defeat, Megawati Sukarnoputri scored a moral victory and her popularity grew. When the time came for the 1997 legislative election, Megawati Sukarnoputri and her supporters threw their support behind the United Development Party (PPP), the other approved opposition party.

=== Reformasi era ===
==== 1999 legislative election ====
In mid-1997, Indonesia began to be affected by the Asian Financial Crisis and showed severe economic distress. By late January 1998 the rupiah fell to nearly 15,000 against the US dollar, compared to only 4,000 in early December. Increasing public anger at pervasive corruption culminated with Suharto's resignation and the assumption of the presidency by Vice President B. J. Habibie in May 1998, starting the Reformation era (Reformasi). The restrictions on Megawati Sukarnoputri were removed and she began to consolidate her political position. In October 1998, her supporters held a National Congress whereby Megawati's PDI faction would now be known as the Indonesian Democratic Party of Struggle (PDI-P). Megawati Sukarnoputri was elected chair and was nominated as PDI-P's presidential candidate.

PDI-P, together with Abdurrahman Wahid's National Awakening Party (PKB) and Amien Rais' National Mandate Party (PAN), became the leading reform forces. Despite their popularity, Megawati Sukarnoputri, Abdurrahman Wahid and Amien Rais adopted a moderate stance, preferring to wait until the 1999 legislative election to begin major changes. In November 1998, Megawati Sukarnoputri, together with Abdurrahman Wahid, Amien Rais and Hamengkubuwono X reiterated their commitment to reform through the Ciganjur Statement.

==== Result and aftermath ====
As the elections approached, Megawati Sukarnoputri, Abdurrahman Wahid and Amien Rais considered forming a political coalition against President Habibie and Golkar. In May, Alwi Shihab held a press conference at his house during which Megawati Sukarnoputri, Abdurrahman Wahid and Amien Rais were to announce that they would work together. At the last minute, Megawati Sukarnoputri chose not to attend, because she decided that she could not trust Amien. In June, the elections were held and PDI-P came first with 33% of the votes.

With the victory, Megawati's presidential prospects solidified. She was opposed by PPP who did not want a female president. In preparation for the 1999 MPR General Session, PDI-P formed a loose coalition with PKB. As the MPR General Session approached, it seemed as if the presidential election would be contested between Megawati Sukarnoputri and B. J. Habibie, but by late June Amien Rais had drawn the Islamic parties into a coalition called the Central Axis. The presidential election became a three-way race when Amien Rais floated the idea of nominating Wahid for president; but Abdurrahman Wahid did not provide a clear response to the proposal.

=== 1999 indirect presidential election ===
==== Election of Wahid as president ====
Megawati's PDI-P and PKB coalition faced its first test when the MPR assembled to choose its chair. Megawati Sukarnoputri threw her support behind Matori Abdul Djalil, the Chair of PKB. He was overwhelmingly defeated by Amien Rais, who in addition to enjoying Central Axis support was backed by Golkar. The Golkar and Central Axis coalition struck again when they secured Akbar Tandjung's election as Head of DPR. At this stage, people became wary that Megawati Sukarnoputri, who best represented reform, was going to be obstructed by the political process and that the status quo was going to be preserved. PDI-P supporters began to gather in Jakarta.

B. J. Habibie made a poorly received speech on political accountability that led him to withdraw. The presidential election held on 20 October 1999 came down to Megawati Sukarnoputri and Abdurrahman Wahid. Megawati Sukarnoputri took an early lead, but was overtaken and lost with 313 votes compared to Wahid's 373. Megawati's loss provoked her supporters to revolt. Riots raged in Java and Bali. In the city of Solo, PDI-P masses attacked Amien's house.

==== Selection as vice president ====
The next day, the MPR assembled to elect the vice president. PDI-P had considered nominating Megawati Sukarnoputri, but were concerned that the Central Axis and Golkar coalition would again thwart her. Instead, PKB nominated Megawati Sukarnoputri. She faced stiff competition from Hamzah Haz, Akbar Tandjung, and General Wiranto. Well aware of the riots, Akbar Tandjung and Wiranto withdrew. Hamzah Haz stayed in the race, but Megawati defeated him 396 to 284. In her inauguration speech, she called for calm.

== Vice presidency (1999–2001) ==
=== Tenure ===
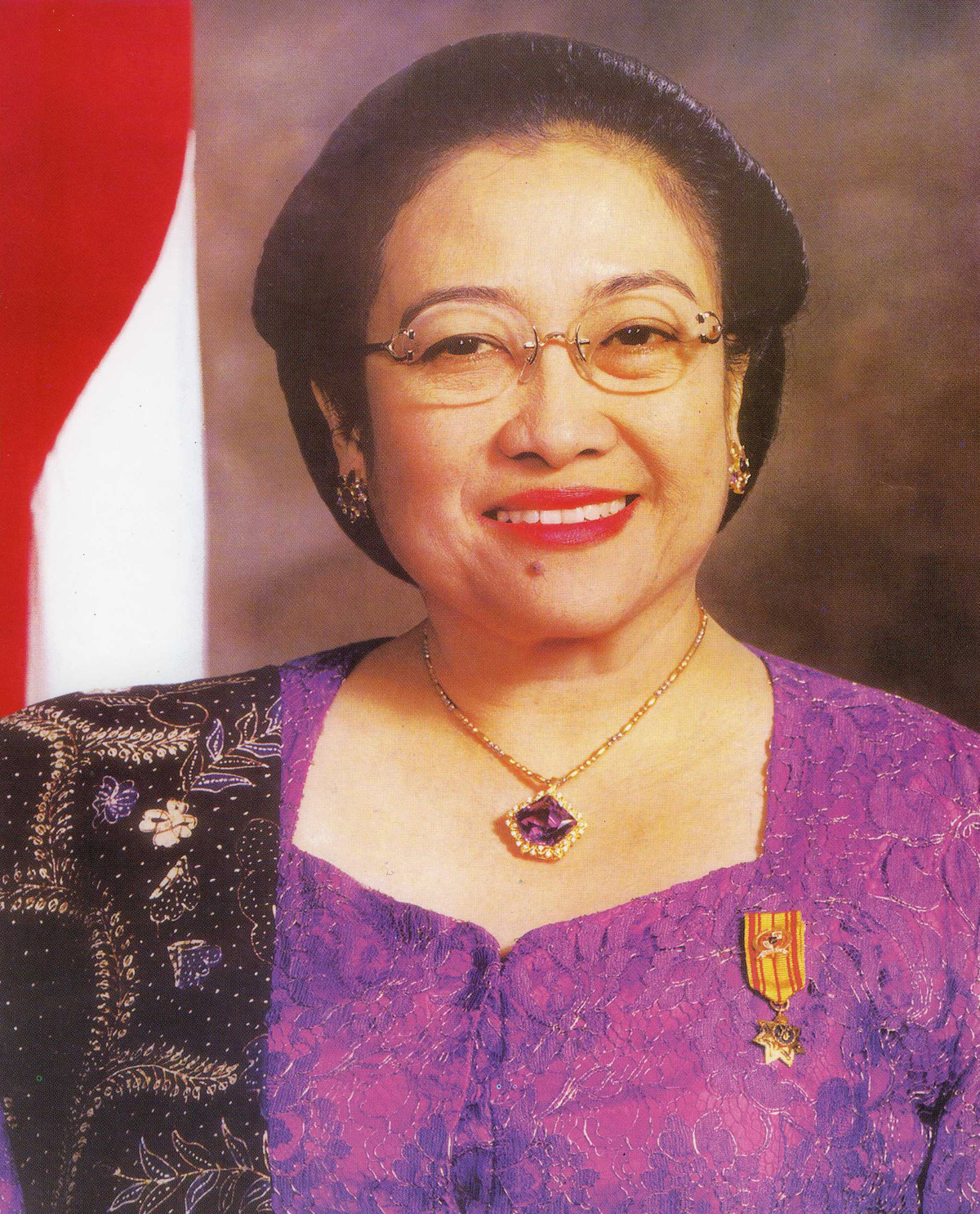
Megawati's official vice-presidential portrait, BRI 2nd Class featured

As vice president, Megawati Sukarnoputri had considerable authority by virtue of her commanding many seats in the DPR. Abdurrahman Wahid delegated to her the problems in Ambon, although she was not successful. By the time the MPR Annual Session assembled in August 2000, many considered Abdurrahman Wahid to be ineffective as president or as an administrator. Abdurrahman Wahid responded to this by issuing a presidential decree, giving Megawati Sukarnoputri day-to-day control of the government.

=== 2000 PDI-P National Congress ===
The First PDI-P Congress was held in Semarang, Central Java, in April 2000, at which Megawati Sukarnoputri was re-elected as chair for a second term.

Megawati Sukarnoputri consolidated her position within PDI-P by taking harsh measures to remove potential rivals. During the election for the chair, two other candidates emerged; Eros Djarot and Dimyati Hartono. They ran because they did not want Megawati Sukarnoputri to serve concurrently as both chair and vice president. Eros' nomination from the South Jakarta branch was voided by membership problems. Eros was not allowed to participate in the Congress. Disillusioned with what he perceived to be a cult of personality developing around Megawati, Eros left PDI-P. In July 2002, he formed the Freedom Bull National Party. Although Dimyati's candidacy was not opposed as harshly as Eros, he was removed as Head of PDI-P's Central Branch. He kept his position as a People's Representative Council (DPR) member, but left the party to become a university lecturer. In April 2002, Dimyati formed the Our Homeland of Indonesia Party (PITA).

=== Rise to the presidency ===
Megawati Sukarnoputri had an ambivalent relationship with Abdurrahman Wahid. During the cabinet reshuffle of August 2000 for example, Megawati was not present for the announcement of the new line-up. At another occasion, when the political tide began to turn against Abdurrahman Wahid, Megawati Sukarnoputri defended him and lashed out against critics. In 2001, Megawati Sukarnoputri began to distance herself from Abdurrahman Wahid as a Special Session of the MPR approached and her prospects of becoming president improved. Although she refused to make any specific comments, she showed signs of preparing herself, holding a meeting with party leaders a day before the Special Session was to start.

== Presidency (2001–2004) ==
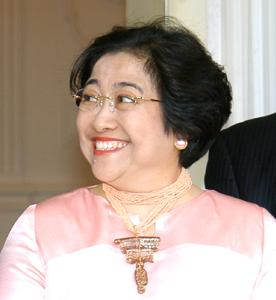
- Megawati in 2004
- Presidency of Megawati Sukarnoputri; 21 July 2001 – 20 October 2004
- Cabinet: Mutual Assistance Cabinet
- Party: Indonesian Democratic Party of Struggle
- Seat: Istana Negara
- Seal of the President of Indonesia

=== Tenure ===
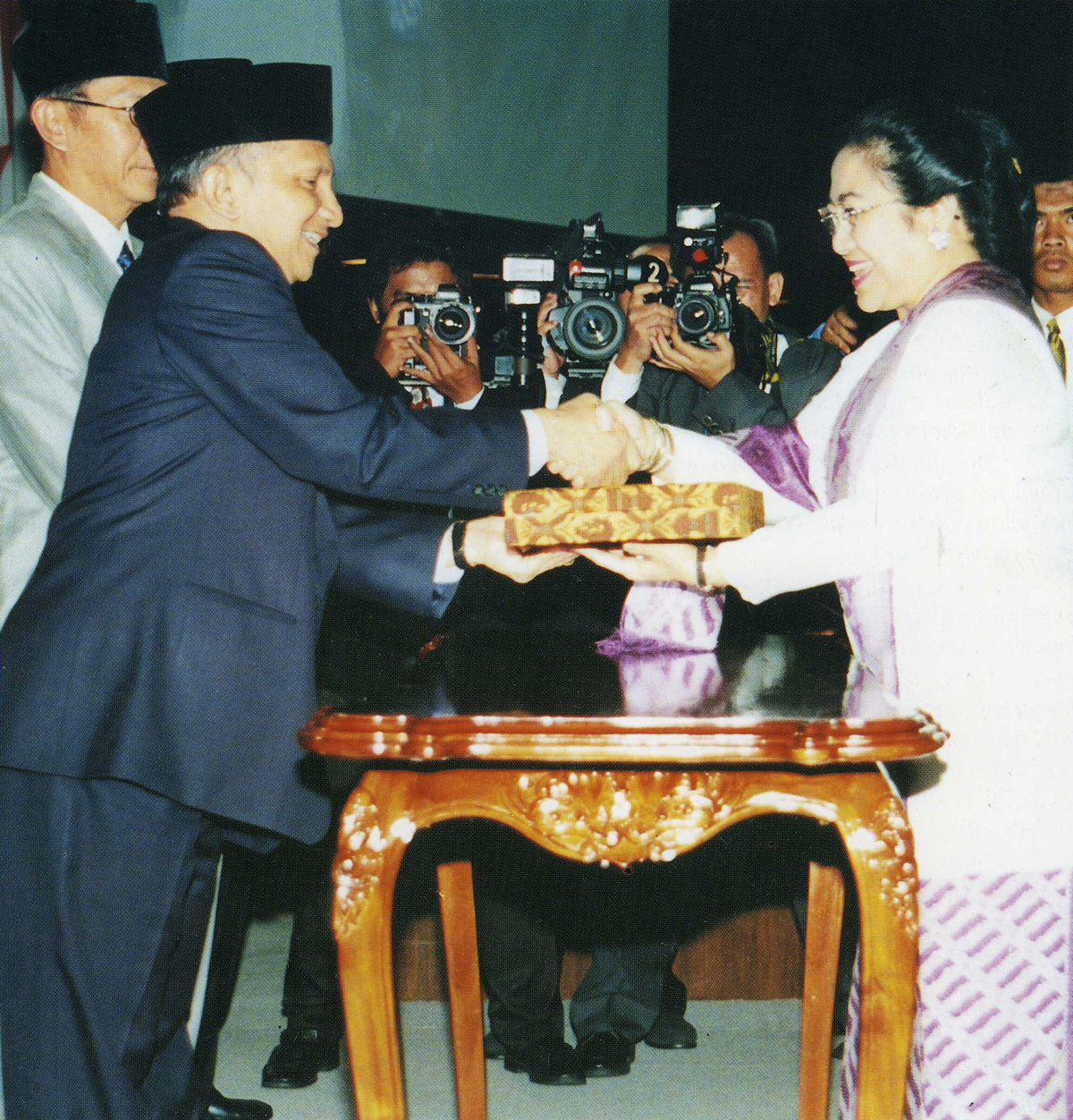
MPR Speaker Amien Rais congratulating Megawati Sukarnoputri on her inauguration as president

On 23 July 2001, the People's Consultative Assembly (MPR) removed Wahid from office and subsequently swore in Megawati as the new president. She thus became the sixth woman to lead a Muslim-majority country. On 10 August 2001, she announced her Mutual Assistance Cabinet.

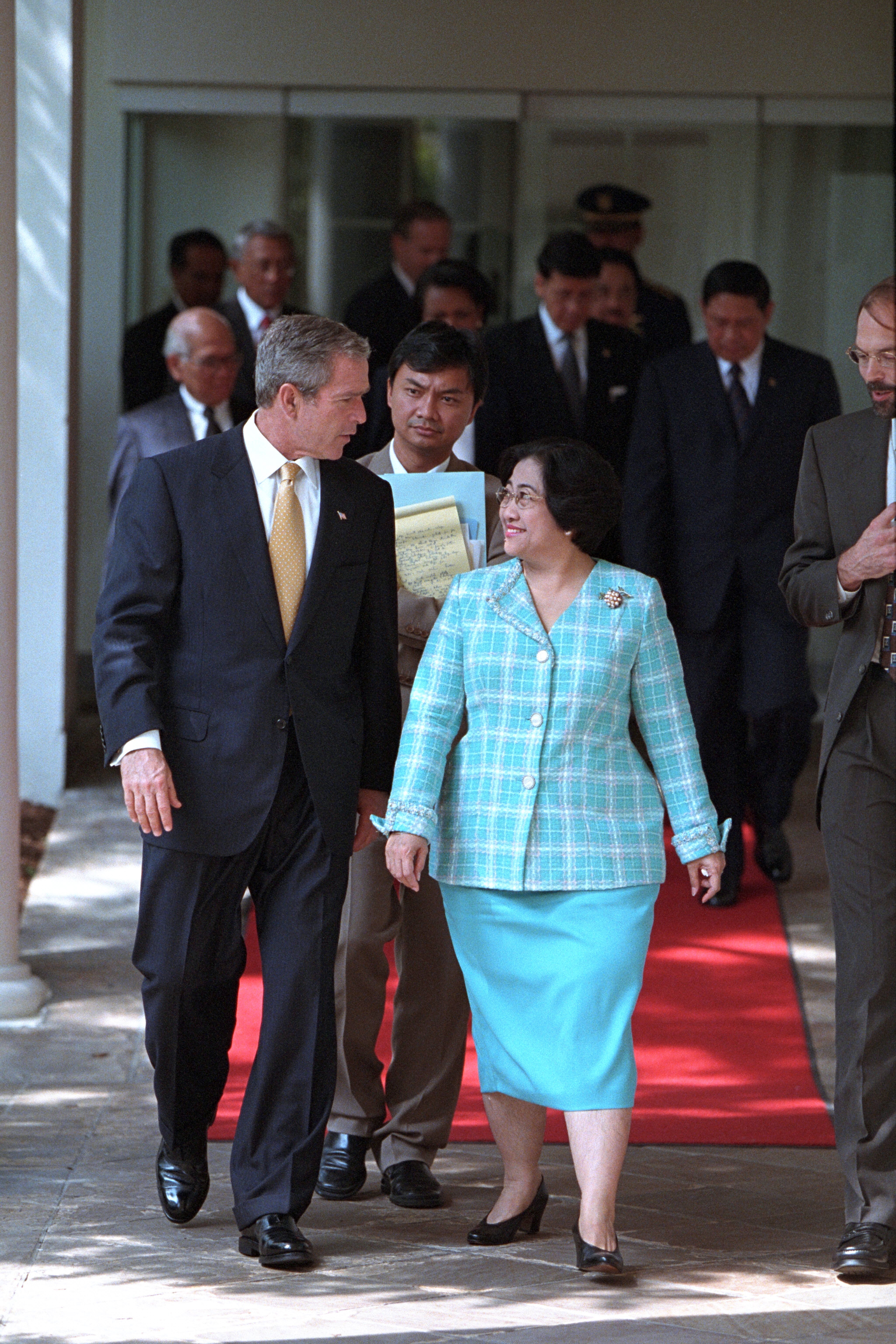
President Megawati during her visit to the White House. Standing beside her was US president George W. Bush.

The rise of an icon of opposition against the Suharto regime to the presidency was initially widely welcomed, however it soon became apparent that her presidency was marked with indecisiveness, lack of clear ideological direction, and "a reputation for inaction on important policy issues". The good side of slow progress of reforms and avoiding confrontations was that she stabilized the overall democratization process and relationship between legislative, executive, and military.

=== Political arrangements and constitutional amendments ===
Reforms conducted from Abdurrahman Wahid's presidency has become Megawati's important agenda in restoring political stability and democracy. In doing so, her administration passed 2 more constitutional amendments with the third amendment being held on 10 November 2001 and the fourth amendment held on 1–11 August 2002. These amendments contributed to the formation of the Constitutional Court and the dissolution of the Supreme Advisory Council. As a contribution to these amendments, her government has drafted many laws that will fulfill the mandate of the amendments made to the Indonesian Constitution, especially in the areas of regional government, political parties, and general elections.

Megawati Sukarnoputri also established the first general election system, where the Indonesian people can directly elect the president and vice president, in addition to electing legislative candidates. As a result, she was given the title "Mother of Upholding the Constitution".

Megawati Sukarnoputri also played an important role in the formation of the Corruption Eradication Commission, an institution tasked with eradicating corruption in Indonesia. In eradicating the rampant corruption inherited from the New Order, she formed the Corruption Eradication Commission (KPK). The formation of the KPK was based on Megawati's view that many legal institutions at that time were not clean, so the KPK needed to be formed. Long before that, the initial idea for forming the Corruption Eradication Committee emerged in the era of President BJ Habibie who issued Law Number 28 of 1999 concerning State Administration that was clean and free from corruption, collusion and nepotism.

Home Affairs Minister Hari Sabarno outlined her administration's focus on decentralization, where the implementation of regional autonomy is carried out fairly to give authority to regions to manage their own regions while maintaining national unity and integrity. In guiding such autonomy and to preserve national unity, her government implements regional autonomy policies that are proportional and consistent, implementing fair financial balance, increasing the distribution of easily accessible public services, correcting gaps in economic development and regional income, and respects regional cultural values based on the mandate of the amendment to the Constitution.

=== Defense and Security ===
The Indonesian National Armed Forces has undergone changes in order to suit their new roles in the democratic administration to be a military force that is more dynamic, ever-ready and flexible to changes. This is specified by Megawati on the following quote:

The TNI has pledged its commitment to continue carrying out its internal reforms by way of taking concrete measures to position itself professionally and functionally as the instrument of state defense and to uphold the enforcement of democracy as well as to abide by the law and to respect human rights

— Megawati Sukarnoputri

One of the roles of the TNI in the democratic political system carried out by President Megawati was also specifically deciding to transfer the authority to carry out security operations in Maluku from the hands of the Police to the hands of the TNI which proved effective in restoring stability in 2002. President Megawati also revived the Iskandar Muda Regional Military Command in February 2002.

She passed Law No. 3 2002 on National Defense which outlines huge changes to the military. The policy stated in the law then became the forerunner of the definitions, goals, roles, targets and implementation of Indonesia's defenses. Apart from making Indonesia a safe country for its people and build peace with, The defense policy also took account of Indonesia's geography as an archipelagic state, making the protection of its extensive maritime territory and islands an important consideration in national defense planning. Megawati also involved non-governmental organizations to assist the military in non-military threats. In 2002, she prepared a budget of IDR 7,5 billion for TNI/POLRI's welfare programs which includes housing for personnels of each branch and facility improvements.

Internationally, the military was hit by an arms embargo imposed by the United States and US President Bill Clinton accused Indonesia of conducting human rights violation in East Timor. The embargo affected Indonesia's ability to purchase spare parts for strategic arsenals such as F-16 Fighting Falcon and Northrop F-5 owned by the Indonesian Air Force and reduced combat readiness of all Indonesian military units down to 50%. As a result, Megawati turned to Russia for military cooperation, resulting in the acquisition of military equipment such as Sukhoi Su-27 fighters and Mil Mi-35 attack helicopters in order to effectively defend Indonesia from external threats.

==== Aceh ====
On 19 May 2003, in response of GAM refusal of the Tokyo peace deal which planned to end the decades long insurgency in Aceh, Megawati gave the 12th Indonesian Military Chief General Endriartono Sutarto, permission to commence military operations against the GAM separatist. General Sutarto also imposed martial law in Aceh for a period of six months and the Indonesian government subsequently deployed 1,500 soldiers and 12,000 police to the province. During the military operation, government forces would conduct numerous human rights abuses including torture, rape, forced disappearances, and murder. An estimated 1,159 rebels died with 147 civilians were killed and 155 wounded during the operation.

==== Papua ====
Under Megawati, Indonesia reaffirmed its presence in Papua and positioned itself as the central government and ensured that the doctrine of independence and the ideas of freedom and self-determination did not emerge. Under the Megawati’s administration, West Papuan independence activist Theys Eluay was assassinated. Megawati’s government also postponed the implementing regulations for the establishment of the Papuan People’s Assembly (Majelis Rakyat Papua), and favored the issuance of a presidential decree to implement Law No. 45/1999 to divide Papua into three distinct provinces.

=== Foreign policy ===
Her administration's foreign policy largely maintained the notion of non-alignment while conducting partnerships in efforts to quell terrorist attacks at the aftermath of the September 11 attacks and 2002 Bali bombings. Shortly after her inauguration, Megawati visited the United States on September 19, 2001 and had a meeting with President George W. Bush where both countries pledged to cooperate against radical Islamic terrorism based on shared democratic values. She also sent her condolences to the victims of the September 11 attacks while telling Bush Indonesia also has the same mission against terrorism. The engagement with President Bush marked a renewal of ties which were previously strained under President Bill Clinton, including discussions on military cooperation and training programs with Indonesia.

The 2002 Bali bombings which killed 202 people, among them 88 Australians prompted Megawati to intensify international cooperation against terrorism. Her administration issued two presidential decrees in lieu of legislation to address terrorism and arrested key suspects, including radical Islamic cleric Abu Bakar Ba'asyir. In a joint press conference on 2003, President Bush commended Megawati's leadership in confronting terrorism and supported her reforms in civil-military administration while also proposed to send a $157 million aid to support basic education for Indonesia. The United States also reaffirmed commitments to military education exchanges and partnerships in regional security.

=== Law enforcement, reconciliation and human rights ===
The Megawati administration inherited political, social, and economic instability from its predecessor. Although she sought to steer Indonesia back onto the right path and advance the nation, many observers felt that her approach to law enforcement lacked sufficient decisiveness. Progress on several major cases that tested her administration such as the "Buloggate II" scandal, which implicated the Speaker of the House of Representatives (DPR), Akbar Tanjung reached a stalemate. Although Akbar Tanjung was found guilty by the court of first instance, he was not taken into custody and continued to perform his duties as Speaker of the House ultimately, he was acquitted by the Supreme Court and remained active as a party leader. Other controversial issues included the case of Tommy Suharto, the failure to investigate alleged corruption involving former President Suharto, and the case of Bank Indonesia Governor Syahril Sabirin, who remained in office despite having been convicted.

Her administration also endeavored to promote the enforcement of human rights and the reconciliation efforts initiated by the previous government. Despite these good intentions, the implementation drew sharp criticism, particularly regarding the human rights tribunals concerning the Tanjung Priok incident and events in East Timor. Megawati responded to these criticisms and sought a solution by addressing the matter in a state of the nation address before parliament in 2004.

"As a nation, we understand how difficult it is to resolve human rights cases of this nature cases rooted in human rights violations tend to leave deep wounds. Therefore, in order to address the historical burden concerning human rights issues particularly those that occurred prior to the enactment of Law Number 26 of 2000 the government proposed a Bill on a Truth and Reconciliation Commission, which was subsequently approved by the House of Representatives in a short period of time."

— Megawati Sukarnoputri

Unfortunately, President Megawati’s strong desire to unite the nation and move beyond resentment and suspicion encountered obstacles. After the Truth and Reconciliation Commission (TRC) Law was officially enacted by the House of Representatives (DPR), several parties filed for a judicial review of specific provisions with the Constitutional Court in 2006. Rather than reviewing only certain articles, the Constitutional Court struck down the entire law, effectively bringing all efforts to build national unity through reconciliation to a complete halt.

In 2003, the People's Consultative Assembly (MPR) considered reviewing the legal status of its decrees (TAP MPR). Although many within her own party urged the revocation of MPR decrees that cast a negative light on her father’s administration such as the ban on the Indonesian Communist Party (PKI) and various decrees concerning Bung Karno. Megawati chose to respect the existing parliamentary consensus rather than impose her own will, especially given the strong opposition from outside her party. Furthermore, she remained firm in his decision not to attend the "Pancasila Sanctity Day" (Hari Kesaktian Pancasila) commemoration, recognizing that the events being marked on that day signaled the beginning of the fall of his father’s administration and the collapse of the power held by his father’s loyal supporters in the mid-1960s.

=== Economic arrangement ===
Since her inauguration, Megawati's administration strive to provide conditions that conducive to rebuilding the economy that has been in ruins ever since the 1997 Asian financial crisis and the political crisis since Suharto's fall between 1998 and 2001. During the early periods of her administration, Indonesia has US$105.8 billion in debt which was inherited from Suharto's regime. As president, she attended Paris Club and London Club meetings in an attempt to renegotiate Indonesia's outstanding debts which result in Megawati able to delay the payments of US$5.8 billion of debts in a Paris Club meeting in 12 April 2002 and prepared a debt payment of Rp.116.3 billion on 2003.

Her administration is widely known for privatizations of state owned enterprises (SOE). According to Megawati, the privatization of SOEs is done to defend SOEs from public intervention and debt payments, to increase efficiency and competitiveness of the SOEs and to speed up economic growth from the private sector. Numerous state enterprises such as Semen Gresik, Bank Negara Indonesia, Kimia Farma and most controversially, Indosat were privatized. In her own journal, Megawati's privatization drive has successfully increased economic growth by 4.1% and suppressed inflation by 5.06%. However, her privatization on SOEs especially on Indosat generated criticisms and Megawati was accused as a neoliberal.

Megawati restored cooperative relations with the International Monetary Fund (IMF) which has been delayed during Wahid's presidency by tasking Coordinating Minister for Economic Affairs Dorodjatun Kuntjoro-Jakti, Minister of Finance Boediono and Governor of Bank Indonesia Burhanuddin Abdullah to fulfill 20 letters of intent from the IMF and World Bank which affects with the disbursement of an IMF loan of around SDR 400 million to strengthen the position of foreign exchange reserves for each LOI received. The partnership itself ends in 2003 due to her criticisms on IMF and World Bank's "confusing" suggestions in recovering Indonesia's economy.

One of her national development focus and leading sector is Indonesia's marine and fisheries economy. On 7 June 2003, Megawati on board KRI Tanjung Dalpele launched the National Movement for Maritime and Fisheries Development (GERBANG MINA BAHARI). In essence, the movement establishes the Maritime and Fisheries sector, Maritime Tourism, Maritime Industry and Services, and Maritime Transportation as the prime mover of national economic development. Simultaneously, other development sectors and political-economic policies support these prime mover sectors. Meanwhile, the basis of Maritime and Fisheries development is Sustainable Development, namely harmonizing efforts to increase economic growth, equal distribution of welfare and environmental preservation.

=== Environment ===
In 2003, Megawati launched a reforestation program in the form of the National Movement for Forest and Terrain Rehabilitation (GERHAN). This program aimed to address the need for rehabilitation of degraded areas which are increasing in size and the destruction of forests and land that has occurred. According to Minister of Marine Affairs and Fisheries Rokhmin Dahuri, Megawati has long loved gardening. Rokhmin said that her personal hobby has also made Megawati to be more aware and concerned about policies related to environmental conservation.

=== 2004 general election ===
Incumbent president Megawati Sukarnoputri was the PDI-P's top nominee, seeking to become the first woman elected in her own right as president of a Muslim-majority country. She was joined by vice-presidential candidate Hasyim Muzadi, general chairman of Indonesia's largest Islamic organisation Nahdlatul Ulama (NU). The pair was assigned the number 2 for its ballot. However, she was decisively defeated by Susilo Bambang Yudhoyono in the second round, by 61 percent to 39 percent, on 20 September 2004. She did not attend the new president's inauguration and never congratulated him.

== Post-presidency (2004–present) ==
=== Leader of the PDI-P ===
==== 2009 general election ====
On 11 September 2007 Megawati Sukarnoputri announced her candidacy in the 2009 presidential election at a PDI-P gathering. Soetardjo Soerjoguritno confirmed her willingness to be nominated as her party's presidential candidate. Her nomination for president was announced on 15 May 2009, with Gerindra Party leader Prabowo Subianto as her running mate.

Megawati's 2009 race was overshadowed by her calls to change Indonesia's voter registration procedure, obliquely suggesting that Yudhoyono's supporters were trying to manipulate the vote. Megawati Sukarnoputri and Prabowo Subianto lost the election to Susilo Bambang Yudhoyono, coming in second with 26.79% of the vote.

==== 2014 general election ====
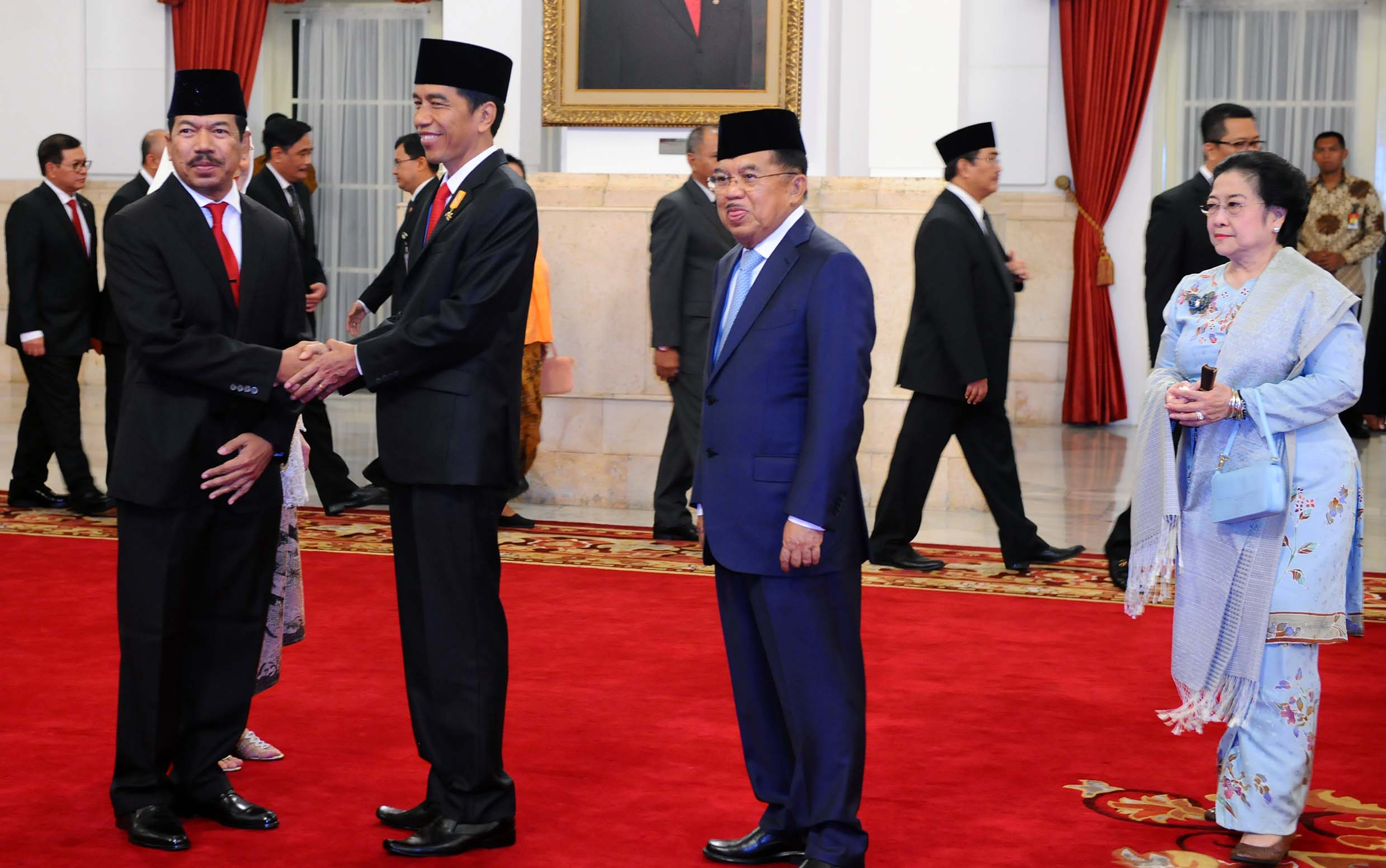
Megawati Sukarnoputri with Joko Widodo and Jusuf Kalla (2nd and 3rd from left) in 2016

On 24 February 2012, Megawati Sukarnoputri distanced herself from polls that placed her as a top contender for the 2014 presidential election. As Chair of PDI-P, she appealed to her party at a gathering in Yogyakarta to focus on its current priorities. Nonetheless, a domain name appeared to have been registered in her name. On 27 December 2012, the daily edition of the Jakarta Post hinted at a possible reconciliation in the 2014 general election between the families of Megawati Sukarnoputri and President Susilo Bambang Yudhoyono and their political parties, her PDI-P and his Democratic Party respectively.

For the 2014 general election, the PDI-P and their coalition partners nominated Joko Widodo as their candidate for president. Joko Widodo defeated his opponent Prabowo Subianto in a hotly contested election. Later, the relationship between Megawati Sukarnoputri and Joko Widodo became strained as she pushed for Police Commissary General Budi Gunawan for the post of the Indonesian Police Chief, despite him being investigated for corruption by the Corruption Eradication Commission (KPK). Budi Gunawan was Megawati's adjutant during her tenure as president. Megawati later criticize Jokowi's decision, quipping him for not carrying out the party line of struggle, which resulted in a controversy. Budi Gunawan was eventually appointed as the Director of the State Intelligence Agency.

At the 4th PDI-P National Congress on 20 September 2014, Megawati Sukarnoputri was reappointed Chair of PDI-P for 2015-2020.

==== 2024 general election ====
On 10 January 2024, during the 51st anniversary of PDI-P, Megawati Sukarnoputri made a speech about several strategic issues, such as neutrality of the authorities, democracy, elections and volunteers. She then gave a satirical speech for Joko Widodo, touching on the stigma of the role of volunteers in winning the presidential election and emphasizing that only parties have the authority to nominate president and vice president. At the end of her speech, Megawati Sukarnoputri said that she was confident that the presidential and vice-presidential candidates from her party coalition, Ganjar Pranowo and Mahfud MD, would win in just one round in the 2024 presidential election. She added that Ganjar Pranowo and Mahfud MD were energetic, intelligent and cared about the little people.

=== Post-presidency appointments ===
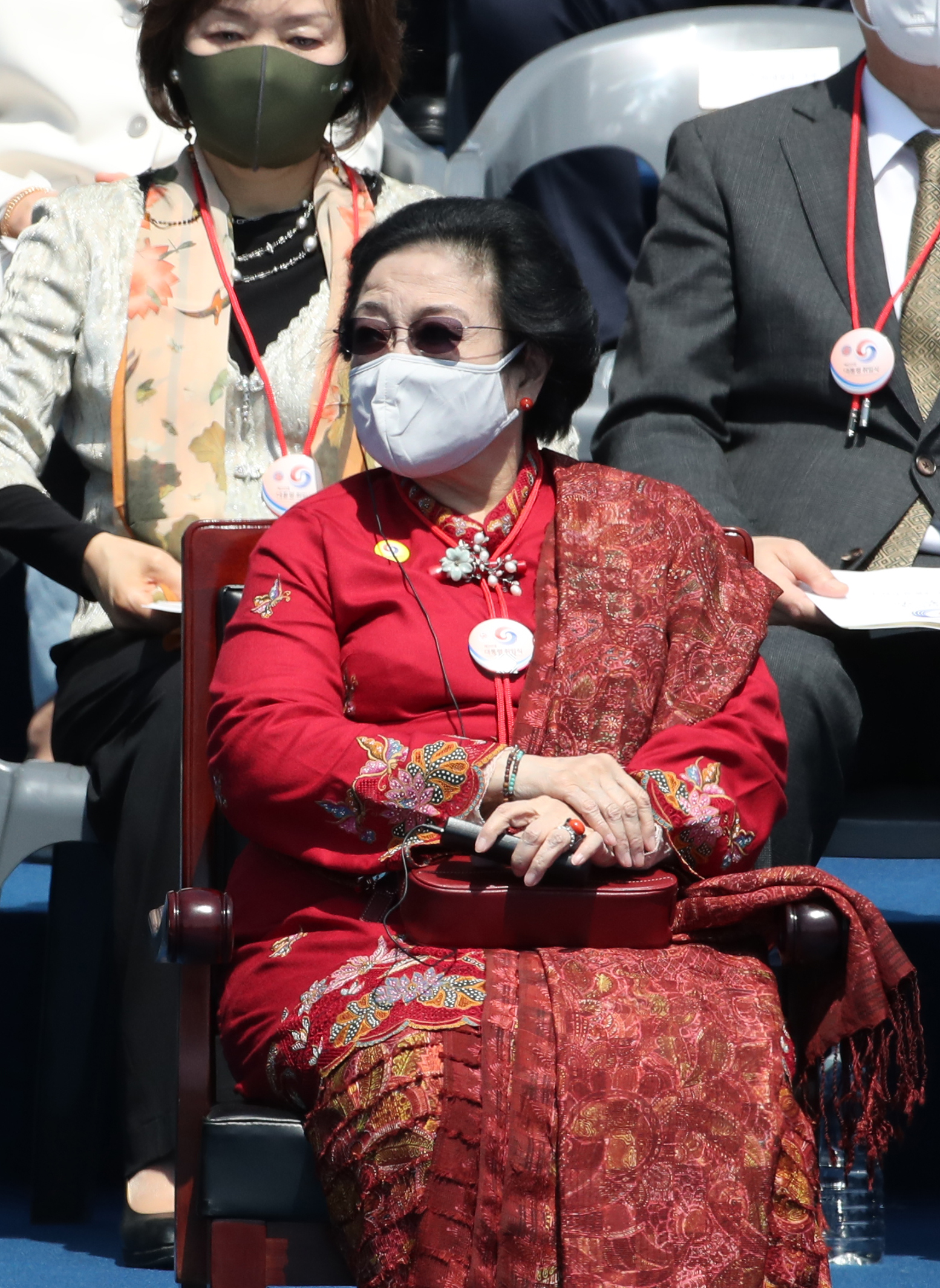
Megawati Sukarnoputri at the inauguration of the South Korean President Yoon Suk-yeol in Seoul, 10 May 2022

So far, Megawati Sukarnoputri is the only former president who somehow retained her influence within the government and even appointed to strategic positions with advisory capabilities. On 22 March 2018, she was appointed as Head of Steering Committee of Pancasila Ideology Development Agency. She also gained position as Head of National Research and Innovation Agency Steering Committee since 5 May 2021, and she was formally appointed on 13 September 2021.

=== Other activities ===
On 4 October 2023, Megawati Sukarnoputri had a meeting with former Malaysian Prime Minister Mahathir Mohamad in Kuala Lumpur. During their discussion, the two senior politicians covered various topics, including Indonesia's plan to relocate its capital city to East Kalimantan.

== Personal life ==
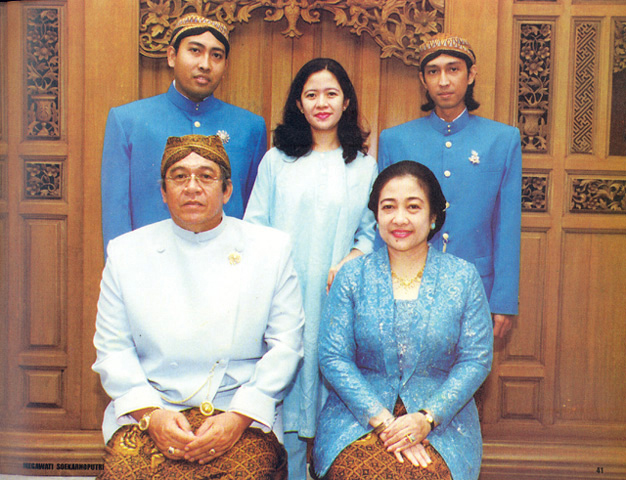
Megawati Sukarnoputri with husband Taufiq Kiemas and three children

Megawati's first husband was First Lieutenant Surindro Supjarso, whom she married on 1 June 1968. He perished in a plane crash in Biak, West Irian, on 22 January 1970. On 27 June 1972, she married Hassan Gamal Ahmad Hassan, an Egyptian diplomat. The marriage was annulled by the Religious Court less than 3 months later. She then married Taufiq Kiemas on 25 March 1973. He died on 8 June 2013. She has three children, Mohammad Rizki Pratama, Muhammad Prananda Prabowo, and Puan Maharani. The sons are from her marriage with Surindro, while Puan Maharani is the only child from Megawati's marriage to Taufiq.

== Honours ==
=== National honours ===
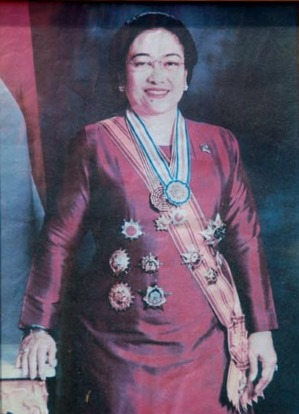
Megawati's official state portrait with her presidential decorations

- Star of the Republic of Indonesia, 1st Class (Indonesian: Bintang Republik Indonesia Adipurna) (8 August 2001)
- Star of the Republic of Indonesia, 2nd Class (Indonesian: Bintang Republik Indonesia Adipradana) (3 February 2001)
- Star of Mahaputera, 1st Class (Indonesian: Bintang Mahaputera Adipurna) (3 February 2001)
- Star of Merit, 1st Class (Indonesian: Bintang Jasa Utama) (8 August 2001)
- Star of Culture Parama Dharma (Indonesian: Bintang Budaya Parama Dharma) (8 August 2001)
- Star of Yudha Dharma, 1st Class (Indonesian: Bintang Yudha Dharma Utama) (8 August 2001)
- Star of Kartika Eka Paksi, 1st Class (Indonesian: Bintang Kartika Eka Paksi Utama) (8 August 2001)
- Star of Jalasena, 1st Class (Indonesian: Bintang Jalasena Utama) (8 August 2001)
- Star of Swa Bhuwana Paksa, 1st Class (Indonesian: Bintang Swa Bhuwana Paksa Utama) (8 August 2001)

=== Foreign honours ===
Kazakhstan:

- 30th Anniversary of the Independence of the Republic of Kazakhstan Jubilee Medal (12 August 2022)

North Korea:

- Order of the National Flag, 1st Class (28 March 2002)

Russia:

- Order of Friendship (2 June 2021)

Timor Leste:

- Grand-collar of the Order of Timor-Leste (9 June 2026)

Political offices
Preceded by Abdurrahman Wahid	President of Indonesia; 23 July 2001 – 20 October 2004	Succeeded by Susilo Bambang Yudhoyono
Preceded by B. J. Habibie	Vice President of Indonesia; 21 October 1999 – 23 July 2001	Succeeded by Hamzah Haz
Party political offices
New political party	Indonesian Democratic Party of Struggle nominee for President of Indonesia; 1999, 2004, 2009 (lost)	Succeeded by Joko Widodo
New political party	Chairperson of the Indonesian; Democratic Party of Struggle; 1999–present	Incumbent
Government offices
New title	Chairperson of BRIN; Steering Committee; 2021–present	Incumbent
Preceded by Herself as Head of UKP-PIP	Chairperson of BPIP; Steering Committee; 2018–present	Incumbent
Diplomatic posts
Preceded by Hun Sen	Chairperson of ASEAN; 2003	Succeeded by Khamtai Siphandon
