= Banknotes of the Indonesian rupiah =

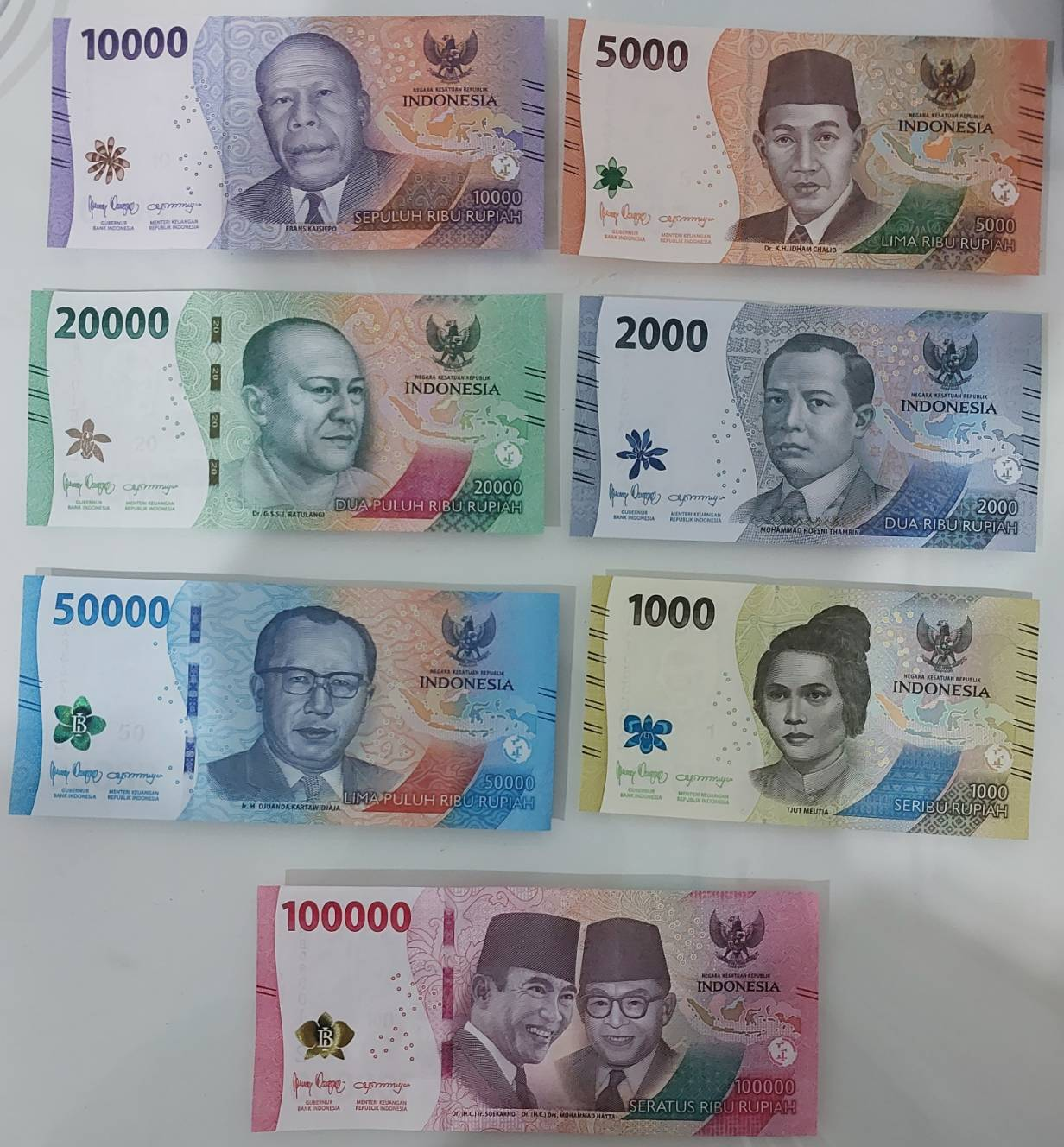
The current (2022) series of rupiah banknotes. Signatures of Perry Warjiyo and Sri Mulyani.

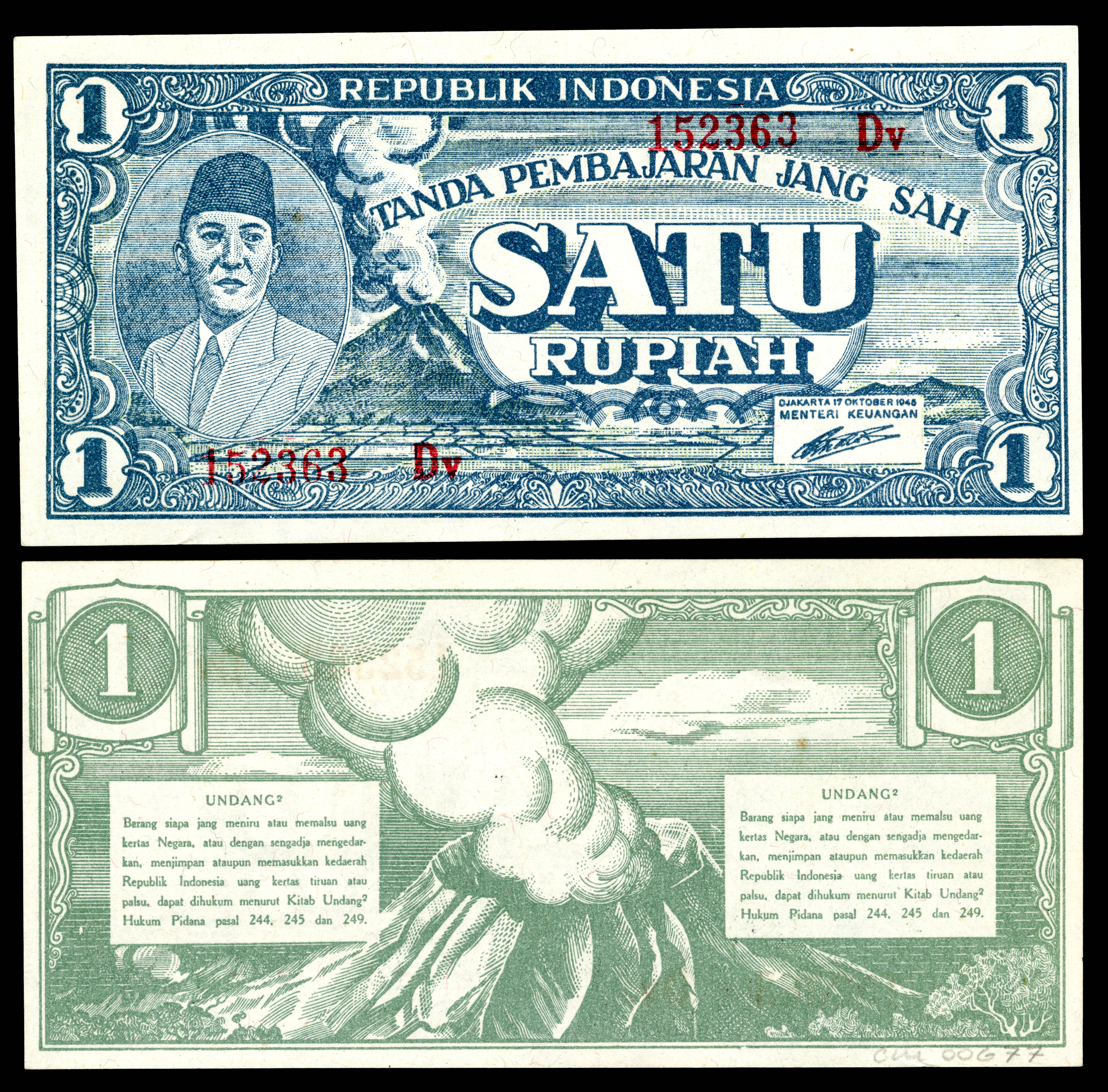
Republic of Indonesia – Rp1 (1945, first year of issue)

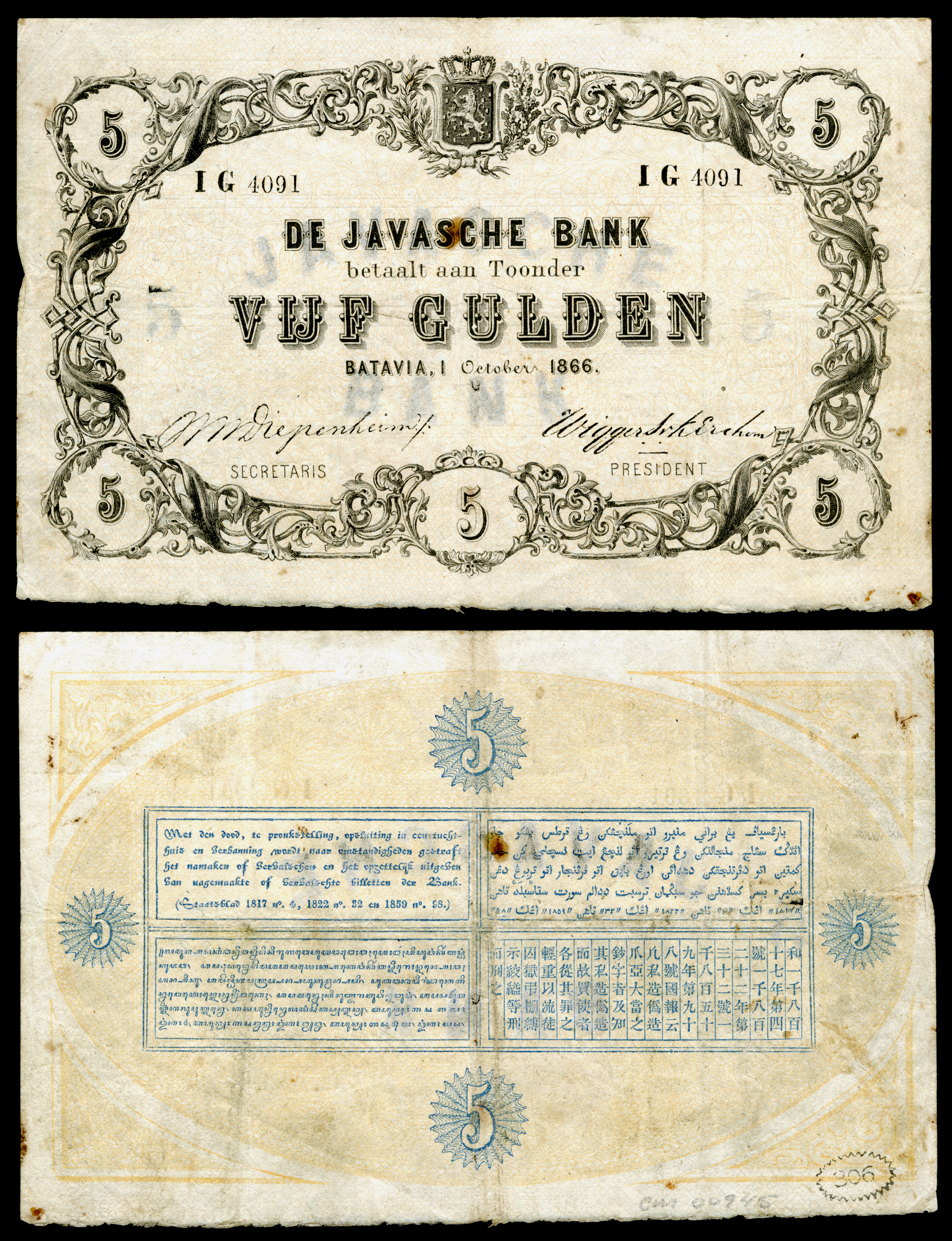
Netherlands Indies (Indonesia) – De Javasche Bank 5 gulden banknote (1866, first year resuming issue)

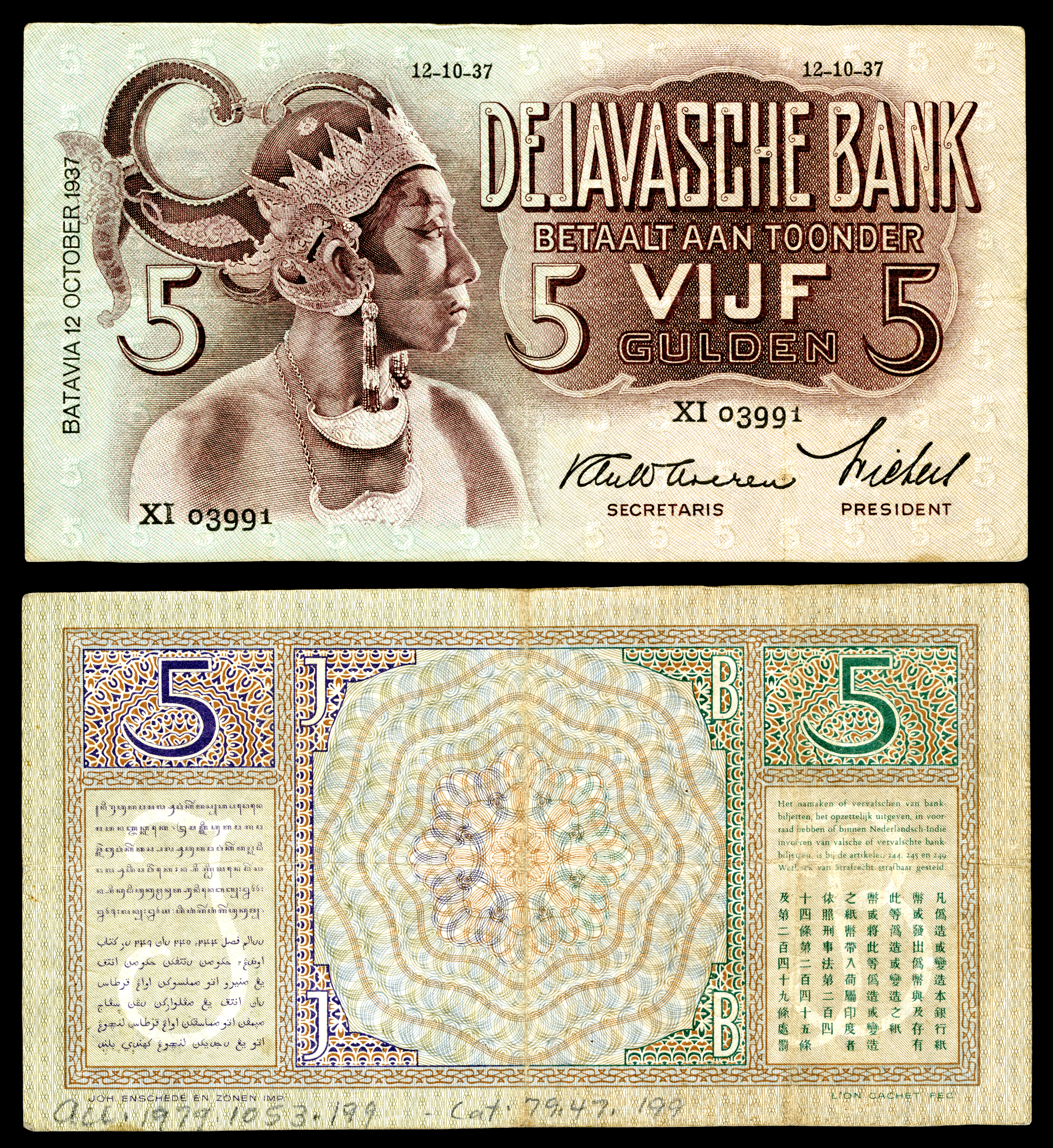
Netherlands Indies (Indonesia) – De Javasche Bank 5 gulden banknote (1937)

The first banknotes used in the archipelago that would become Indonesia were those issued by the United East India Company, credit letters of the rijksdaalder dating between 1783 and 1811. Netherlands Indies gulden government credit paper followed in 1815, and from 1827 to 1842 and again from 1866 to 1948 gulden notes of De Javasche Bank. Lower denominations (below 5 gulden) were issued by the government in 1919–1920 and in 1939–1940 due to wartime metal shortages, but otherwise day-to-day transactions were conducted using coinage.

Gulden notes were issued by "The Japanese Government" during the Japanese occupation of the Dutch East Indies from 1942, becoming "roepiah" in 1943.

The first truly Indonesian rupiah notes, however, were issued in 1946, during the war of independence with the Dutch, following the unilateral proclamation of independence by the Indonesians at the end of World War II on 17 August 1945. This money is known as Oeang Republik Indonesia (ORI; oeang being the old spelling of uang ("money")).

Following the negotiated peace treaty in The Hague of 1949, the ORI was withdrawn, and replaced by an internationally recognised Indonesian rupiah.

The Indonesian rupiah has been subject to numerous devaluations, and in 1965 the existing paper was withdrawn and replaced by a new rupiah at the rate of 1,000 to 1.

== Independence period (1945–1950) ==
=== First series (17 October 1945) ===
The first 'Indonesian rupiah' bank notes bore the date of the rupiah's proclamation, 17 October 1945, under the authority of the newly-formed republic, and were put in circulation in Java starting from 10 October 1946. The notes were in denominations of 1 cents, 5 cents, 10 cents, 50 cents, Rp1, Rp5, Rp10, and Rp100.

1945 Republik Indonesia series
Image		Value	Dimensions	Main colour	Description				Date of			Remarks
Obverse	Reverse	Value	Dimensions	Main colour	Obverse	Reverse	Watermark	Serial	Printing	Issue	Withdrawal	Remarks
		Rp0.01	97 × 45 mm	Green	Keris	Counterfeit warning	None	None	1946	10 October 1946	1 May 1950	Violet underprint
		Rp0.01	97 × 45 mm	Green	Keris	Counterfeit warning	None	None	1946	10 October 1946	1 May 1950	Green underprint
		Rp0.05	100 × 49 mm	Violet	Various leaves	Counterfeit warning with wings	None	None	1946	10 October 1946	1 May 1950	Buffalo underprint (strong)
		Rp0.05	100 × 49 mm	Dark blue	Various leaves	Counterfeit warning with wings	None	None	1946	10 October 1946	1 May 1950	Buffalo underprint (faint)
		Rp0.10	105 × 51 mm	Black	Keris and machete underprint	Counterfeit warning	None	None	1946	10 October 1946	1 May 1950	Narrow borders
		Rp0.10	105 × 51 mm	Brown	Keris and machete underprint	Counterfeit warning	None	None	1946	10 October 1946	1 May 1950	Narrow borders
		Rp0.10	105 × 51 mm	Brown	Keris and machete underprint	Wide borders	None	None	1946	10 October 1946	1 May 1950	
		Rp1/2 (0.50)	119 × 58 mm	Green	Horned motif	Counterfeit warning	None	Six numbers two letters [01234]nnnnn [LMNPRST] [PRTUVWX]	1946	10 October 1946	1 May 1950	Pink underprint
		Rp1/2 (0.50)	119 × 58 mm	Green	Horned motif	Counterfeit warning	None	Six numbers two letters [01234]nnnnn [LMNPRST] [PRTUVWX]	1946	10 October 1946	1 May 1950	Orange underprint
		Rp1	138 × 65 mm	Blue	Sukarno, volcano	Volcano, counterfeit warning	None	Some without serial, some with six-digit, two-letter serial (1st letter is check code), some with simple two letter code	1946	10 October 1946	1 May 1950	
		Rp5	148 × 71 mm	Green	Rice stalks, Sukarno	Rice stalks, counterfeit warning	None	Six numbers, two letters, first letter is check code; two different serial printing styles	1946	10 October 1946	1 May 1950	
		Rp10	160 × 77 mm	Blue	Sukarno, volcano	Counterfeit warning	None	Six numbers, two letters, or six numbers, three letters. First letter is check code. Several serial printing styles	1946	10 October 1946	1 May 1950	
		Rp100	174 × 86 mm	Blue/green	Sukarno, keris, horned '100'	Counterfeit warning, horned '100'	None	Five numbers, two letters, first letter is check code.	1946	10 October 1946	1 May 1950	
These images are to scale at 0.7 pixel per millimetre (18 pixel per inch). For table standards, see the banknote specification table.

=== Second series (1 January 1947) ===
The second series of money now emanated from 'Djokjakarta', the Republic's base following the 'Police Action' of 21 July 1947, which had confined the Republicans to Yogyakarta and Central Java. The notes were dated 1 January 1947, in denominations of Rp5, Rp10, Rp25, and Rp100.

1947 First Issue (1 January 1947)
Note	Value
	Rp5
	Rp10
	Rp25
	Rp100

=== Third series (26 July 1947) ===
The next new issue was dated 26 July 1947, and consisted of Rp1/2, Rp2 1/2, Rp25, Rp50, Rp100, and Rp250 notes.

=== Fourth series (23 August 1948) ===
New notes were issued by the national government in 1948, in the bizarre denominations of Rp40, Rp75, Rp100, and Rp400, plus an unissued Rp600 note.

On 19 December 1948, the Dutch seized Yogyakarta, reverting the head office of the then-Republic's central bank Bank Negara Indonesia back to De Javasche Bank, with DJB offices also reopened in Surakarta and Kediri.

It was planned in 1949 to revalue the national rupiah notes of the republic (which were at this time circulating in Java). To do this, "rupiah baru" ('new rupiah') notes were printed. This revaluation did not take place in Java, but some were issued in Aceh instead. The denominations printed were Rp0.10 sen (blue or red), Rp1/2 (green or red), Rp1 (purple or green), Rp10 (black or brown), Rp25, and Rp100.

=== Regional issues (ORIDA) ===
In addition to the 'national' (but restricted in practice to the central republican enclave in Java) notes, the republican authorities, instructed regional commanders in areas that the national money couldn't reach to issue their own currency in order to discourage the circulation of Dutch money. These money were to be unified after full independence.

Rp25 note of Banten Residency, 15 December 1947

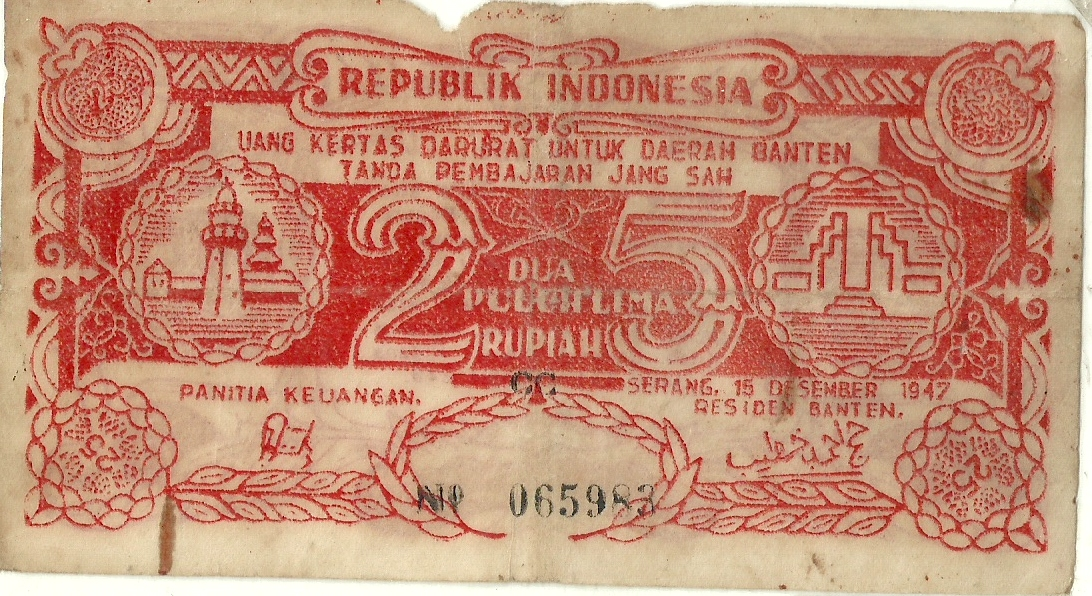
Obverse

==== Sumatra ====
Rp10 note of "Sumatra Province" (dated 1 January 1948)

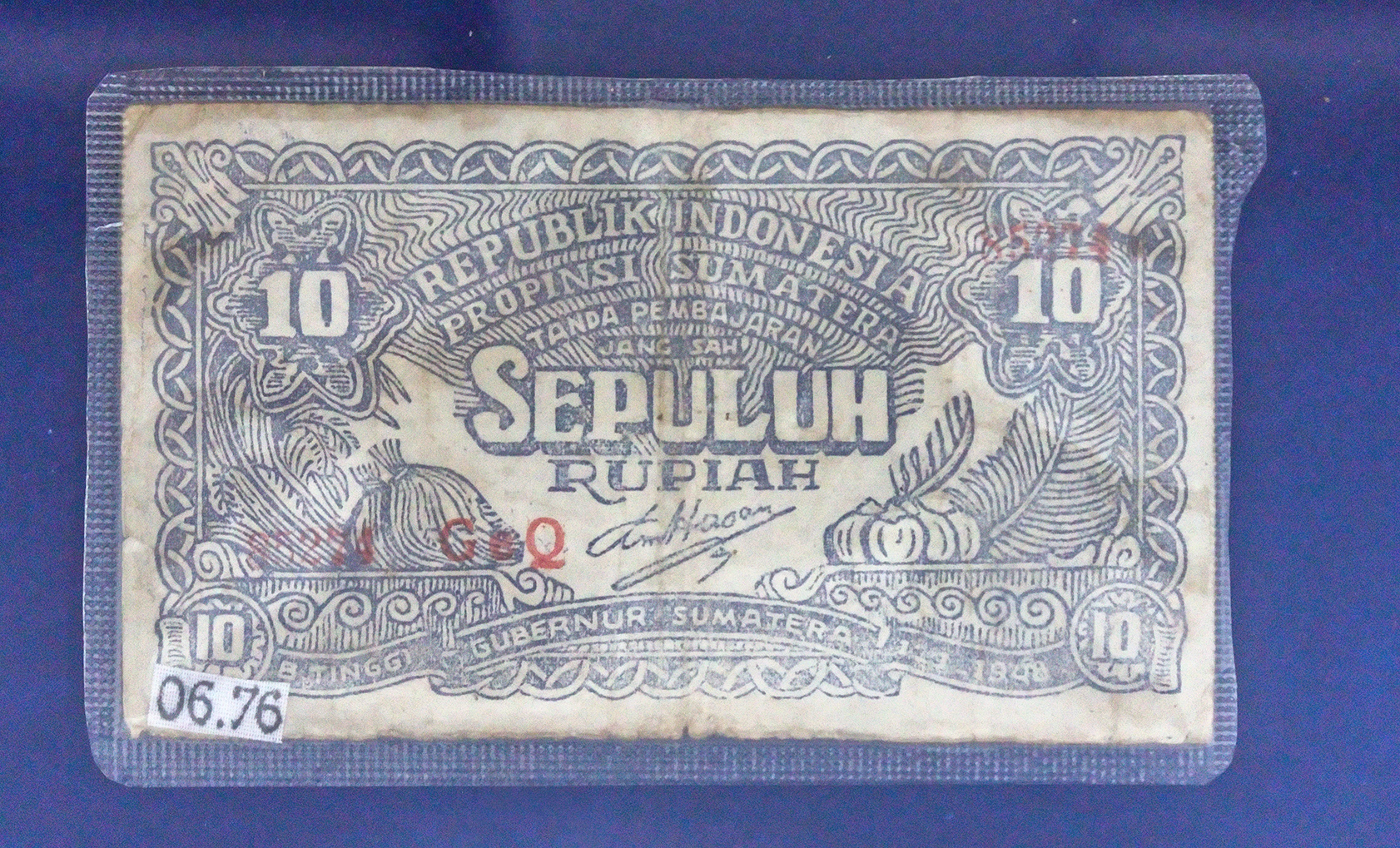
Obverse

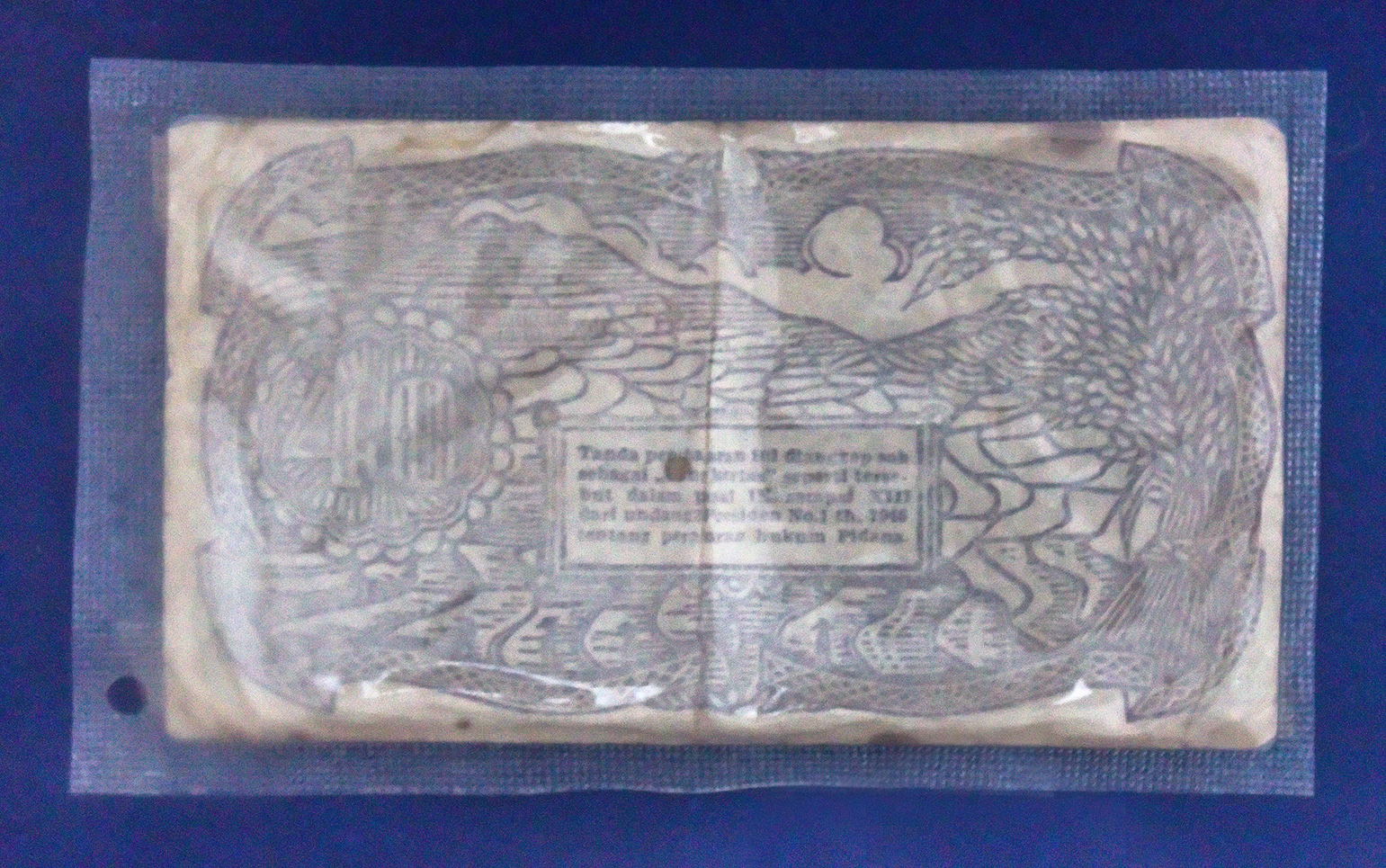
Reverse

Rp500 note of Bengkulu Residency (dated 1 June 1947)

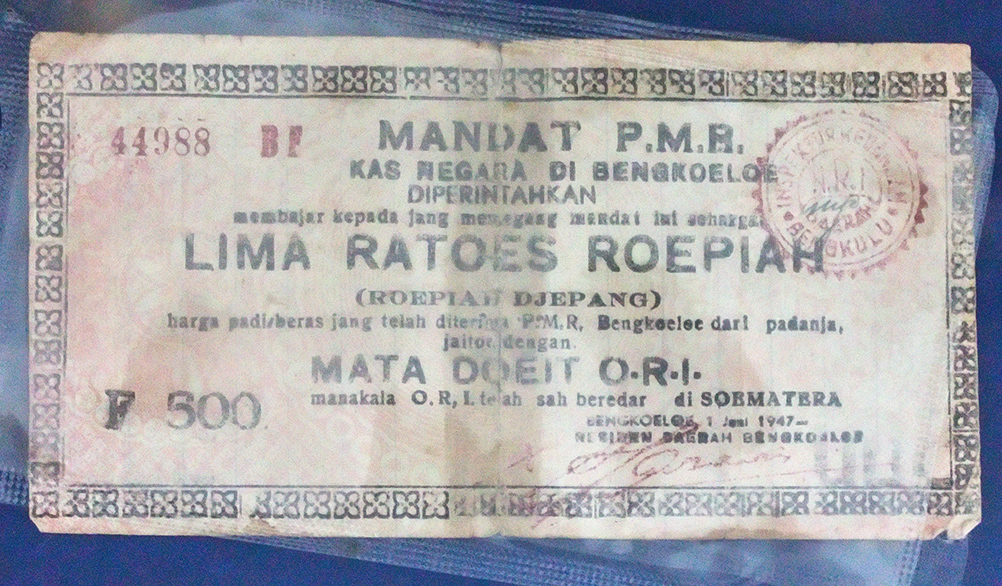
Obverse

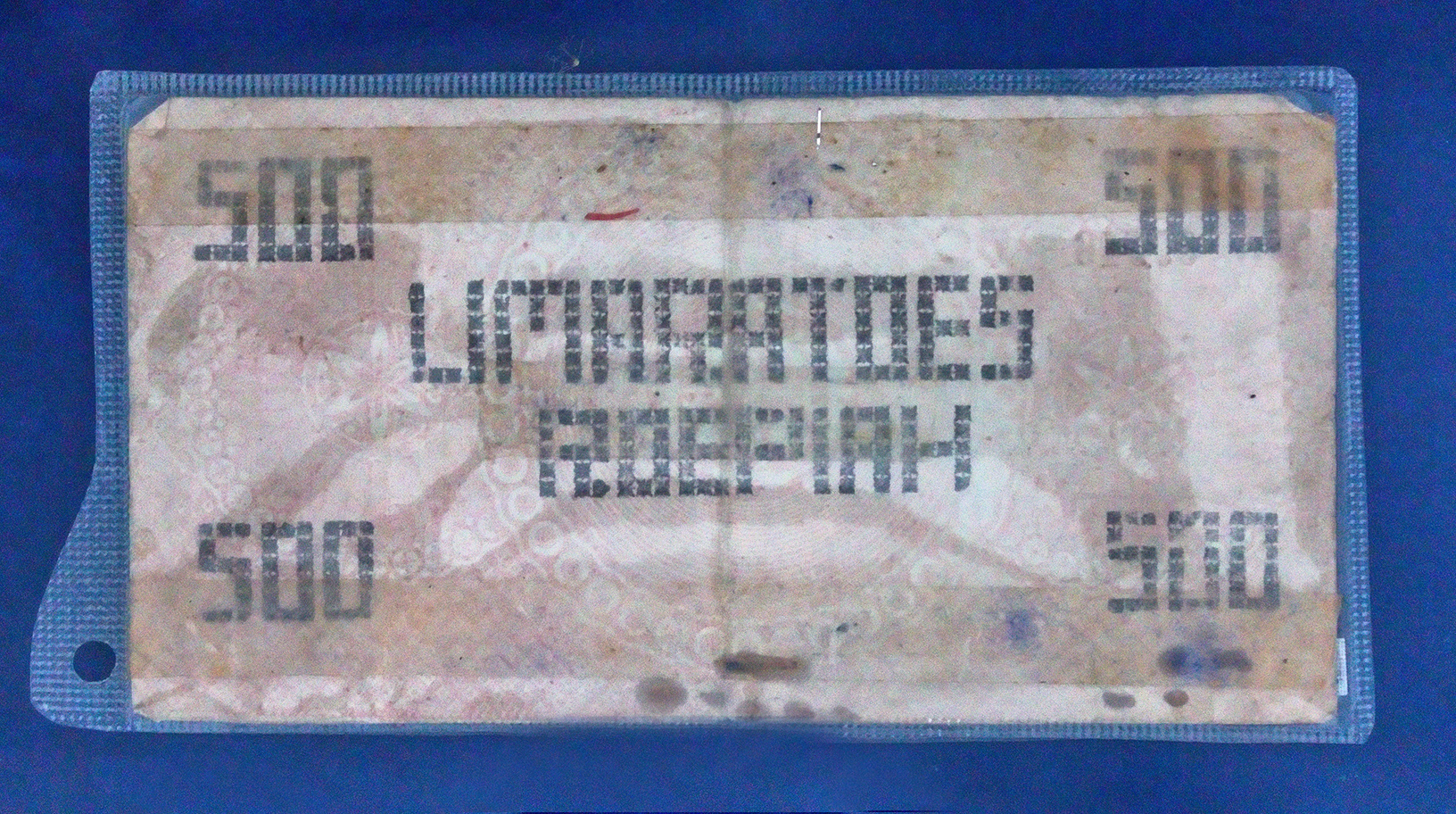
Reverse

Rp1,000 note of Bengkulu Residency (dated 1 June 1947)

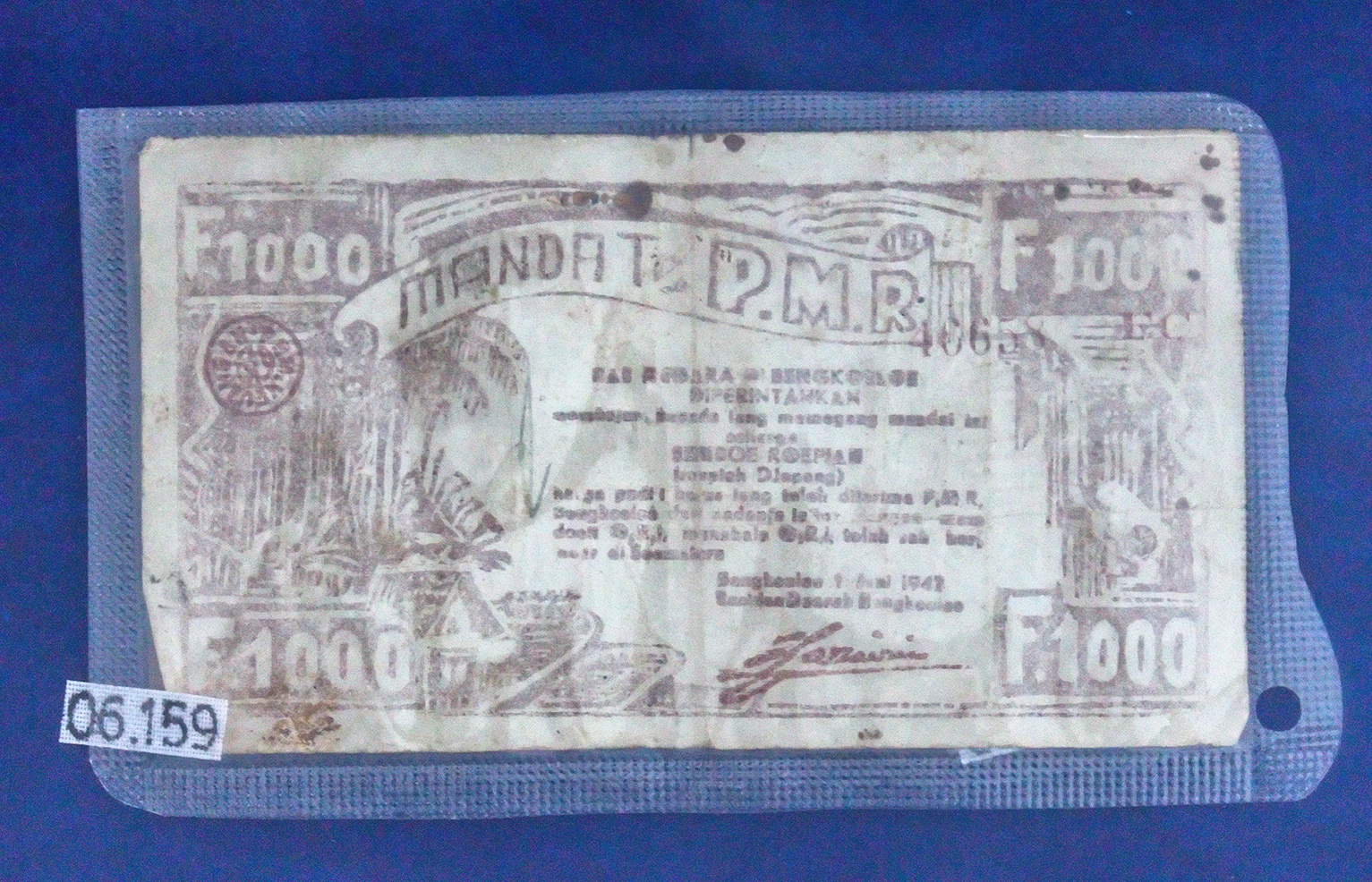
Obverse

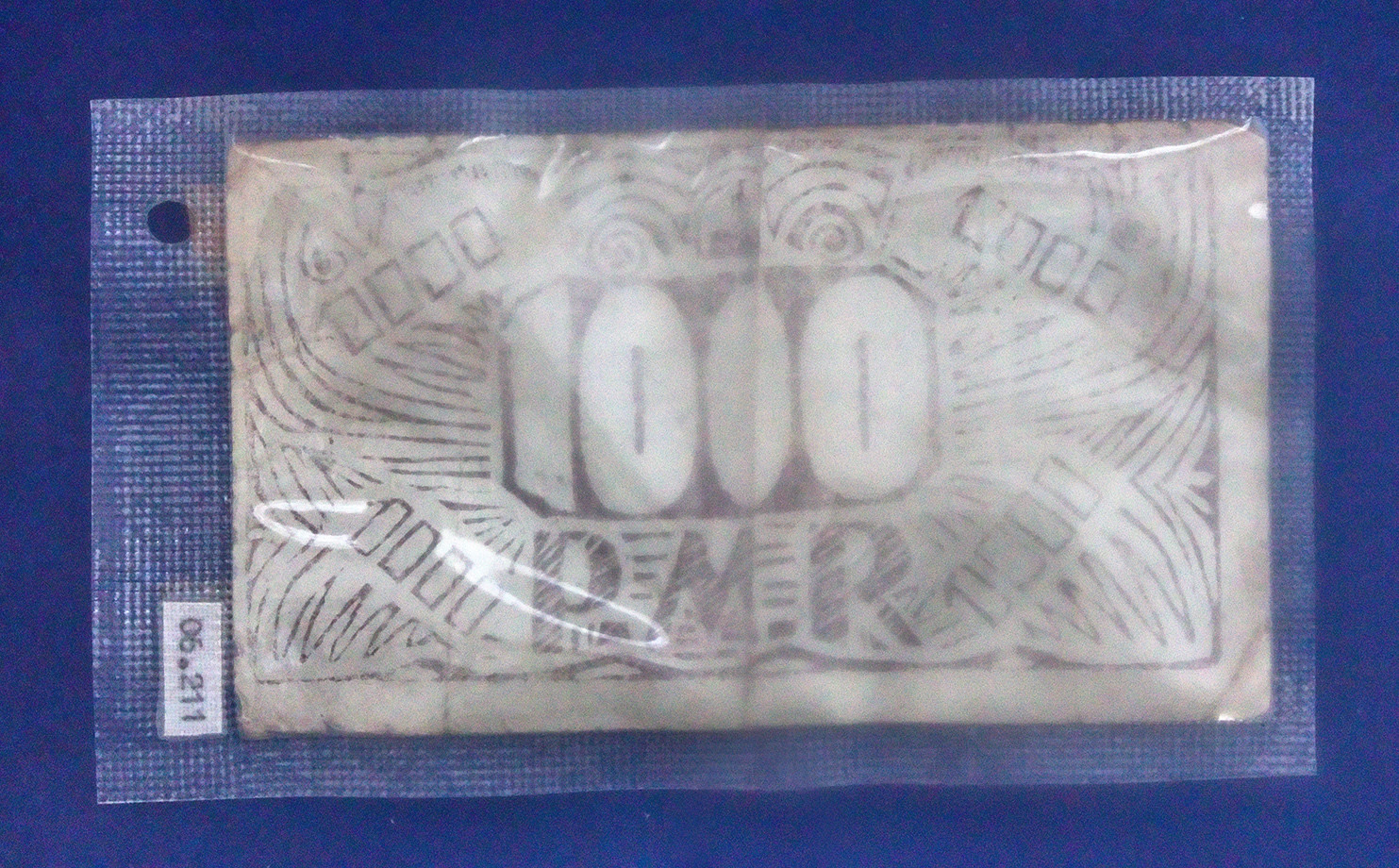
Reverse

== Old Order (1950–1966) ==
=== Gulden/roepiah notes (1950–1952) ===
==== Low denomination notes ====
The Dutch treasury had in 1947 issued Indonesian language Rp0.10 and Rp0.25 notes. Due to the initial lack of coinage and due to their relatively republic-friendly design, the Indonesian government saw it as expedient to continue to print these notes, and authorised their issue until such time as coinage had been minted, and in sufficient quantity to replace them.

Dutch 'Indonesia' notes of 1947, printed by G. Kolff & Co.
Image		Value	Dimensions	Main colour	Description				Date of	
Obverse	Reverse	Value	Dimensions	Main colour	Obverse	Reverse	Serial	Signature	note	Withdrawal date
		Rp0.10	100 × 60 mm	Green / Red	Floral border	Counterfeit warning in Indonesian and Dutch	None	J.E. van Hoogstraten (Chairman of the Court of Audit), W.A. Alons (Director of Finance)	1 December 1947	1 January 1957
		Rp0.25	100 × 60 mm	Brown / Blue	Central floral design	Counterfeit warning in Indonesian and Dutch	None	J.E. van Hoogstraten (Chairman of the Court of Audit), W.A. Alons (Director of Finance)	1 December 1947	1 January 1957
These images are to scale at 0.7 pixel per millimetre (18 pixel per inch). For table standards, see the banknote specification table.

==== De Javasche Bank notes ====
The peace settlement with the Dutch, negotiated in The Hague in November 1949, had kept De Javasche Bank as the central bank in Indonesia, hence the first notes that were issued for the post-independence rupiah bore its imprint. It was decided that the existing De Javasche Bank money dated 1946 would simply be revised in colour, with the 5 gulden note changing from purple to red and green, the 10 gulden from green to purple, and 25 gulden from red to green. In addition, 50 gulden, 100 gulden, 500 gulden, and 1,000 gulden notes were added, still dated 1946.

Because there were existing Rp0.10 and Rp0.25 notes (which remained as legal tender and continued to be printed), a gap existed between the Rp0.25 Indonesia and 5 gulden De Javasche Bank notes. This was filled with Rp1/2, Rp1, and Rp2 1/2 notes, all dated 1948. The notes in wording were similar to the notes of 5 gulden and up, but the Indonesian text ('roepiah') placed above Dutch ('gulden').

The notes were all printed by Johan Enschede en Zonen based in the Netherlands.

1950 De Javasche Bank notes, printed by Joh. Enschede en Zonen
Image		Value	Dimensions	Main colour	Description					date of			
Obverse	Reverse	Value	Dimensions	Main colour	Obverse	Reverse	Serial	Signature	Watermark	Note	Issue date	Withdrawal date	Replacement note
		Rp5	150 × 75 mm	Green and red	Lotus flower	Counterfeit warning in Dutch, Indonesian, Javanese, and Chinese; letters DJB	6 numbers and either 2 or 3 letters	H. Teunissen (Secretary), R.E. Smits (President)	Checkered-pattern rhombus	1946	19 March 1950	13 December 1965	2 June 1950
		Rp10	150 × 75 mm	Purple	Mangosteen	Counterfeit warning in Dutch, Indonesian, Javanese, and Chinese; letters DJB	6 numbers and either 2 or 3 letters	H. Teunissen (Secretary), R.E. Smits (President)	Checkered-pattern rhombus	1946	19 March 1950	13 December 1965	2 June 1950
		Rp25	150 × 75 mm	Green	Coconut trees at sea shore	Counterfeit warning in Dutch, Indonesian, Javanese, and Chinese; letters DJB	6 numbers and either 2 or 3 letters	H. Teunissen (Secretary), R.E. Smits (President)	Checkered-pattern rhombus	1946	19 March 1950	13 December 1965	18 June 1954
		Rp50	150 × 75 mm	Blue	Sailboat	Counterfeit warning in Dutch, Indonesian, Javanese, and Chinese; letters DJB	6 numbers and either 2 or 3 letters	H. Teunissen (Secretary), R.E. Smits (President)	Checkered-pattern rhombus	1946	19 March 1950	13 December 1965	13 August 1954
		Rp100	150 × 75 mm	Brown	Paddy field	Counterfeit warning in Dutch, Indonesian, Javanese, and Chinese; letters DJB	6 numbers and either 2 or 3 letters	H. Teunissen (Secretary), R.E. Smits (President)	Checkered-pattern rhombus	1946	19 March 1950	13 December 1965	18 December 1953
		Rp500	150 × 75 mm	Red	Paddy field	Counterfeit warning in Dutch, Indonesian, Javanese, and Chinese; letters DJB	6 numbers and 2 letters	H. Teunissen (Secretary), R.E. Smits (President)	Checkered-pattern rhombus	1946	19 March 1950	24 August 1959	18 December 1953
		Rp1,000	150 × 75 mm	Grey	Paddy field	Counterfeit warning in Dutch, Indonesian, Javanese, and Chinese; letters DJB	6 numbers and 2 letters	H. Teunissen (Secretary), R.E. Smits (President)	Checkered-pattern rhombus	1946	19 March 1950	5 March 1959	2 November 1954
		Rp½	124 × 64 mm	Pink	Moon orchid	Counterfeit warning in Dutch and Indonesian; letters DJB	Letter 'A' (2 sizes), or 'AA', written fractionally over 2 numbers, followed by 6 numbers	H. Teunissen (Secretary), R.E. Smits (President)	None	1948	19 March 1950	1 December 1957	Last of denomination
		Rp1	124 × 64 mm	Blue	Coconut trees	Counterfeit warning in Dutch and Indonesian; letters DJB	Letter 'B' (3 sizes), or 'BB', written fractionally over either 1 or 2 numbers, followed by 6 numbers	H. Teunissen (Secretary), R.E. Smits (President)	None	1948	19 March 1950	1 December 1957	3 October 1951
		Rp2½	124 × 64 mm	Red	Jasmine	Counterfeit warning in Dutch and Indonesian; letters DJB	Letter 'C' (2 sizes) over 1 or 2 numbers, followed by 6 numbers	H. Teunissen (Secretary), R.E. Smits (President)	None	1948	19 March 1950	1 December 1957	3 October 1951
These images are to scale at 0.7 pixel per millimetre (18 pixel per inch). For table standards, see the banknote specification table.

=== Federal (Republik Indonesia Serikat) notes (1950) ===
The RIS government passed legislation on 2 June 1950 to allow it to issue new treasury notes, which were printed by Thomas De La Rue and dated 1 January 1950 in denominations of Rp5 and Rp10. This move was not long-lasting, as the federation dissolved on 17 August 1950.

1950 'Republik Indonesia Serikat' Notes, printed by Thomas De La Rue
Image		Value	Dimensions	Main colour	Description				Date of	
Obverse	Reverse	Value	Dimensions	Main colour	Obverse	Reverse	Serial	Signature	Issue date	Withdrawal date
		Rp5	136 × 64 mm	Red	Sukarno	Rice field	"D" over number between 1 and 10, followed by six numbers	Sjafruddin Prawiranegara	2 June 1950	
		Rp10	136 × 64 mm	Purple	Sukarno	Rice field	"E" over number between 1 and 19, followed by six numbers	Sjafruddin Prawiranegara	2 June 1950	
These images are to scale at 0.7 pixel per millimetre (18 pixel per inch). For table standards, see the banknote specification table.

=== Nationalisation of De Javasche Bank: first Republik Indonesia banknotes (1951–1953) ===
With the nationalisation of De Javasche Bank via the Emergency Act of 1951 which was strengthened by Currency Act of 1953, it was decreed that the government would be able to issue notes valued Rp1 and Rp2½. Thus, 'Republik Indonesia' notes dated 1951 and 1953 were issued in Rp1 and Rp2½ denominations; these were signed by Sjafruddin Prawiranegara in 1951 and Soemitro Djojohadikoesoemo in 1953.

Government Notes: Republik Indonesia, first series (landscapes), 1951, printed by Security Banknote Printing Company (USA)
Image		Value	Dimensions	Main colour	Description					date of			
Obverse	Reverse	Value	Dimensions	Main colour	Obverse	Reverse	Serial	Signature	Watermark	Note	Issue date	Withdrawal date	Replacement note
		Rp1	127 × 66 mm	Blue	Beach with palms, rice terrace	Mountain	2 letters, 1 above the other, 6 numbers	Sjafruddin Prawiranegara	None	"1951"			1954
		Rp1	127 × 66 mm	Blue	Beach with palms, rice terrace	Mountain	2 letters, 1 above the other, 6 numbers	Soemitro Djojohadikoesoemo	None	"1953"			1954
		Rp2½	127 × 66 mm	Red	Beach with cliff, palms	Garuda Pancasila	2 letters, 1 above the other, 6 numbers	Sjafruddin Prawiranegara	None	"1951"			1954
		Rp2½	127 × 66 mm	Red	Beach with cliff, palms	Garuda Pancasila	2 letters, 1 above the other, 6 numbers	Soemitro Djojohadikoesoemo	None	"1953"			1954
These images are to scale at 0.7 pixel per millimetre (18 pixel per inch). For table standards, see the banknote specification table.

=== First ever notes issued by Bank Indonesia (1953) ===
Notes featuring the new name of the nationalised De Javasche Bank, Bank Indonesia, were prepared dated 1952, in denominations of Rp5, Rp10, Rp25, Rp50, Rp100, Rp500, and Rp1,000, signed by Indra Kasoema as Director, and Sjafruddin Prawiranegara as Governor. The notes began circulating from July 1953 to November 1954 depending on denomination.

1952 Bank Indonesia notes ('culture series')
Image		Value	Dimensions	Main colour	Description				date of		
Obverse	Reverse	Value	Dimensions	Main colour	Obverse	Reverse	Serial	Printer's mark	Issue date	Withdrawal date	Replacement note
		Rp5	135 × 75 mm	Blue	Ibu Kartini	Floral design, serpents	5' followed by 1, 2, or 3 letters, then 5 numbers	Thomas De La Rue	2 July 1953	16 January 1961	1 September 1959
		Rp10	135 × 75 mm	Brown	Statue of Dewi Sri	Floral design, beasts	2 (Joh. Enschede) or 3 (Joh. Enschede/Perkeba) letters, then six numbers	Joh. Enschede en Zonen/Pertjetakan Kebajoran	2 July 1953	16 January 1961	5 September 1959
		Rp25	142 × 82 mm	Blue	Kalpataru	Batik ship	2 (Joh. Enschede) or 3 (Joh. Enschede/Perkeba) letters, then six numbers	Joh. Enschede en Zonen/Pertjetakan Kebajoran	18 June 1954	16 January 1961	5 September 1959
		Rp50	142 × 82 mm	Green	Trees/bird	Batik	2 or 3 letters then six numbers	Joh. Enschede en Zonen	13 August 1954	16 January 1961	1 August 1959
		Rp100	142 × 82 mm	Brown	Lion statue, Diponegoro	2 stylised birds kissing	2 or 3 letters then six numbers	Joh. Enschede en Zonen	18 December 1953	15 December 1960	24 June 1958
		Rp500	150 × 90 mm	Red/green	Hindu relief	Batik	2 or 3 letters then six numbers	Joh. Enschede en Zonen	18 December 1953	21 September 1959	6 January 1959
		Rp1,000	150 × 90 mm	Green/red	Padmapani statue, Prambanan relief	Wooden dish from Kasepuhan Palace, Cirebon	two or three letters, starting W/WW, then six numbers	Joh. Enschede en Zonen	2 November 1954	7 August 1958	2 September 1958
These images are to scale at 0.7 pixel per millimetre (18 pixel per inch). For table standards, see the banknote specification table.

Despite the new notes, which meant that paper bearing the name of DJB was no longer printed, the DJB notes dated '1946', and in fact circulating since 1950, remained legal tender right up to the 'new rupiah' of 1965 (which invalidated ALL previous money at that point), although some old DJB notes were repealed, as follows:

- 2 March 1956: 1000 gulden '1946' note dating from 1950 withdrawn, effective 5 March 1959, due to rampant counterfeiting.
- 22 November 1957: Rp1 and Rp2½ '1948' DJB notes withdrawn, effective 1 December 1957, because these denominations of notes were the issuing privilege of the government under the 1914 Currency Act in force at the time of their issue, and hence De Javasche Bank had lacked the authority for their issue.

The few Netherlands Indies government notes (all low denomination) still legal tender were repealed as follows:

- 1 January 1954: all "Nederlandsch Indie" government money withdrawn: 1/2, 1, and 2½ gulden notes, all dating from early World War 2, 1940
- 1 January 1957: Rp0.10 and Rp0.25 "Indonesia" "1947" notes withdrawn (these were also issued by the Republic of Indonesia)

=== 1954 government note redesign ===
In 1954, Rp1 and Rp2½ notes issued by the Indonesian government were redesigned, which were re-dated with the new Minister of Finance's signature in 1956.

Government Notes: Republik Indonesia, third series (ethnic people), 1954, printed by Pertjetakan Kebajoran
Image		Value	Dimensions	Main colour	Description					date of			
Obverse	Reverse	Value	Dimensions	Main colour	Obverse	Reverse	Serial	Signature	Watermark	Note	Issue date	Withdrawal date	Replacement note
		Rp1	130 × 60 mm	Blue	Javanese girl	Garuda Pancasila	3 letters, 6 numbers	Ong Eng Die	None	"1954"			1960
		Rp1	130 × 60 mm	Blue	Javanese girl	Garuda Pancasila	3 letters, 6 numbers	Jusuf Wibisono	None	"1956"			1960
		Rp2½	130 × 60 mm	Red and green	Rotinese man	Garuda Pancasila	3 letters, 6 numbers	Ong Eng Die	None	"1954"			1960
		Rp2½	130 × 60 mm	Red and green	Rotinese man	Garuda Pancasila	3 letters, 6 numbers	Jusuf Wibisono	None	"1956"			1960
These images are to scale at 0.7 pixel per millimetre (18 pixel per inch). For table standards, see the banknote specification table.

=== Second "Animals" series of Bank Indonesia banknotes (1958–1959) ===
In 1957, governor of Bank Indonesia Sjafruddin Prawiranegara commissioned a new series of notes from Thomas De La Rue. However, Sjafruddin's involvement with PRRI meant that he was replaced in January 1958 as governor by Loekman Hakim. Specimens were produced in denominations of Rp5, Rp10, Rp25, Rp50, Rp100, Rp500, Rp1,000, and Rp5,000, and the first of these to be brought into circulation were the Rp100 and Rp1,000 notes in 1958 due to the counterfeiting of these denominations of the 1952 series (it can be distinguished by the wavy line watermark being printed onto the paper rather than a true watermark).

In addition to the 8 notes designed, Loekman commissioned a new Rp2,500 note. Apart from the Rp100 and Rp1,000 notes, the remaining high denomination note, the Rp500, was released on 6 January 1959.

Issuance of the notes was interrupted by a devaluation of 24 August 1959, with Rp500 (tiger) and Rp1,000 (elephant) notes devalued to Rp50 (crocodile) and Rp100 (squirrel) in September 1959. The Rp2,500 and Rp5,000 notes were deemed unnecessary as a result, although continued high inflation caused the former denomination to be issued three years later, while the latter was never issued. The Rp10 and Rp25 notes were only circulated for 3 days although they remained legal tender, and are today extremely rare.

Animal Series (not dated, first printed 1957, except for the 2500 rupiah), all printed Thomas De La Rue
Image		Value	Dimensions	Main colour	Description					date of		
Obverse	Reverse	Value	Dimensions	Main colour	Obverse	Reverse	Signature	Watermark	Serial	Issue date	Withdrawal date	Replacement note
		Rp5	125 × 65 mm	Green and blue	Gibbon	Prambanan	Sjafruddin Prawiranegara (Governor) TRB. Sabaroedin (Director)	Diponegoro	"5" followed by 1, 2, or 3 letters, then 5 numbers	1 September 1959	10 June 1962	19 January 1960
		Rp10	133 × 69 mm	Brown and green	Deer	Kora Kora	Sjafruddin Prawiranegara (Governor) TRB. Sabaroedin (Director)	Diponegoro	"10" followed by 3 letters, then 5 numbers	5 September 1959	3 January 1961	2 January 1960
		Rp25	141 × 73 mm	Brown and red	Javan rhinoceros	Tapanuli traditional house	Sjafruddin Prawiranegara (Governor) TRB. Sabaroedin (Director)	Diponegoro	"25" followed by 3 letters, then 5 numbers	5 September 1959	3 January 1961	2 January 1960
		Rp50	149 × 77 mm	Red	Crocodile	Grand Mosque of Medan	Sjafruddin Prawiranegara (Governor) TRB. Sabaroedin (Director)	Diponegoro	"50" then 1 or 2, letters then 5 numbers	1 August 1959	21 May 1965	19 January 1960
		Rp100	157 × 81 mm	Green and red	Squirrel	Istana Bogor	Sjafruddin Prawiranegara (Governor) TRB. Sabaroedin (Director)	Diponegoro	"100" then 1, 2, or 3 letters then 4 numbers	24 June 1958	21 May 1965	8 September 1959
		Rp500	165 × 85 mm	Red/green	Sumatran tiger	Rice terrace	Sjafruddin Prawiranegara (Governor) TRB. Sabaroedin (Director)	Diponegoro	"500" then 1 or 2 letters then 4 numbers	6 January 1959	21 September 1959	Denomination withdrawn – reintroduced 1 May 1960
		Rp1,000	173 × 89 mm	Blue and brown	Elephant	Fisherman	Sjafruddin Prawiranegara (Governor) TRB. Sabaroedin (Director)	Diponegoro	"1000" then 1 or 2 letters, then 4 numbers	2 September 1958	21 September 1959	Denomination withdrawn – reintroduced 10 May 1960
		Rp2,500	181 × 92 mm	Green and blue	Komodo dragon	Fishing village, Martapura River	Loekman Hakim (Governor), TRB Sabaroedin (Director)	Diponegoro	"2500" then 1 letter or 2 letters, then 4 numbers; or "2500" then 2 letters over "I" plus 5 numbers	1 September 1962	13 March 1966	Last of denomination
		Rp5,000	190 × 97 mm	Red	Bull	Merchant ship and tugboat	Sjafruddin Prawiranegara (Governor) TRB. Sabaroedin (Director)	Diponegoro	5000A0000	Unissued specimen only		
These images are to scale at 0.7 pixel per millimetre (18 pixel per inch). For table standards, see the banknote specification table.

=== First Indonesian-designed notes, the "handicrafts" series (1959) ===
8 September 1959 brought the first purely Indonesian-designed notes, issued by the state printer Pertjetakan Kebajoran. Notes issued are worth Rp5 through Rp100 (see full "handicrafts" section below for full details).

=== Thomas De La Rue flowers and birds banknotes (1960) ===
Another series of notes, the 'flowers' series, was issued by Bank Indonesia in 1960 (showing flowers on the obverse and birds on the reverse), and dated 1 January 1959, but issued in 1960. These notes were printed by Thomas De La Rue.

Due to inflation, the TDLR Rp2,500 note of "animals" design was last issued in September 1962, becoming then the top denomination.

Flowers and birds series, dated '1 January 1959', issued 1960, printed by Thomas De La Rue
Image		Value	Dimensions	Main colour	Description					date of	
Obverse	Reverse	Value	Dimensions	Main colour	Obverse	Reverse	Signature	Watermark	Serial	Issue date	Withdrawal date
		Rp5	125 × 65 mm	Blue and yellow	Epiphyllum oxypetalum	4 Cinnyris jugulariss	Loekman Hakim (Governor), TRB Sabaroedin (Director)	Garuda Pancasila	'5' followed by 1, 2, or 3 letters, then 5 numbers	19 January 1960	13 June 1966
		Rp10	133 × 68 mm	Red and green	Hoya flowers	4 cockatoos	Loekman Hakim (Governor), TRB Sabaroedin (Director)	Garuda Pancasila	'10' followed by 1, 2 or 3 letters, then 5 numbers	2 January 1960	13 June 1966
		Rp25	141 × 72 mm	Green and blue	Nelumbo nucifera	2 great egrets	Loekman Hakim (Governor), TRB Sabaroedin (Director)	Garuda Pancasila	'25' followed by 1, 2, or 3 letters, then 5 numbers	2 January 1960	13 June 1966
		Rp50	149 × 77 mm	Orange and purple	Stylised Nelumbo nucifera	2 white-bellied fish-eagles	Loekman Hakim (Governor), TRB Sabaroedin (Director)	Garuda Pancasila	'50' then 1, 2 or 3 letters then 5 numbers	19 January 1960	13 June 1966
		Rp100	157 × 81 mm	Purple	Amorphophallus campanulatus	5 rhinoceros hornbills	Loekman Hakim (Governor), TRB Sabaroedin (Director)	Garuda Pancasila	'100' then 1, 2, or 3 letters then 5 numbers	19 January 1960	13 June 1966
		Rp500	165 × 85 mm	Blue and red	Bougainvillea	Green junglefowls	Loekman Hakim (Governor), TRB Sabaroedin (Director)	Garuda Pancasila	'500' then 1, 2, or 3 letters then 4 numbers, or '500', 1 letter, 5 numbers	10 May 1960	13 March 1966
		Rp1,000	173 × 89 mm	Black and blue	Jasmine flower	Bird-of-paradise	Loekman Hakim (Governor), TRB Sabaroedin (Director)	Garuda Pancasila	'1000' then 1, 2, or 3 letters, then 4 numbers, or '1000' then 2 letters over 'I', then 5 numbers	1 May 1960	13 March 1966
		Rp2,500	180 x 92 mm	Orange and red	Flowers	Great argus displaying	Loekman Hakim (Governor), TRB Sabaroedin (Director)	Garuda Pancasila	2500AA0000	Unissued specimen only	
		Rp5,000		Violet	Flowers, Pura split gate		TRB Sabaroedin (Director)	Garuda Pancasila		Uniface proof note only	
These images are to scale at 0.7 pixel per millimetre (18 pixel per inch). For table standards, see the banknote specification table.

=== New design for government banknotes (1960–1961) ===
A new design for the Rp1 and Rp2½ government notes was issued in 1960 showing agricultural workers on its obverse and its results on its reverse. Notes dated 1960 were signed by Finance Minister Ir. Djuanda Kartawidjaja while notes dated 1961 were signed by Finance Minister Raden Murobikandi Notohamiprojo.

Government Notes: Republik Indonesia, fifth series (agriculture theme), 1960, printed by Pertjetakan Kebajoran
Image		Value	Dimensions	Main colour	Description					date of			
Obverse	Reverse	Value	Dimensions	Main colour	Obverse	Reverse	Serial	Signature	Watermark	Note	Issue date	Withdrawal date	Replacement note
		Rp1	120 × 60 mm	Green and yellow	Rice farmers	Vegetables	3 letters, 6 numbers	Ir. Djuanda Kartawidjaja	None	"1960"		13 June 1966	13 December 1965
		Rp1	120 × 60 mm	Green and yellow	Rice farmers	Vegetables	3 letters, 6 numbers	Raden Murobikandi Notohamiprodjo	None	"1961"		13 June 1966	13 December 1965
		Rp2½	120 × 60 mm	Blue	Corn farmers	Corn and paddy	3 letters, 6 numbers	Ir. Djuanda Kartawidjaja	None	"1960"		13 June 1966	13 December 1965
		Rp2½	120 × 60 mm	Blue	Corn farmers	Corn and paddy	3 letters, 6 numbers	Raden Murobikandi Notohamiprodjo	None	"1961"		13 June 1966	13 December 1965
These images are to scale at 0.7 pixel per millimetre (18 pixel per inch). For table standards, see the banknote specification table.

=== Complete handicrafts series (1961–1964) ===
The Bank Indonesia-printed handicrafts series replaced the TDLR notes in 1961 and 1962, with denominations from Rp5 to Rp1,000 being issued. The first Rp10,000 banknote was introduced in 1964. A further response to inflation came with the issue of a 1958-dated Rp5,000 (brown) note in October 1963. By August 1964, it was necessary to add a Rp10,000 note, the first of its kind, and dated "1964," completing the manual workers series.

Native crafts/houses banknotes, printed by Pertjetakan Kebajoran, issued 1959, 1961, 1962, 1963, 1964 – first series
Image		Value	Dimensions	Main colour	Description					date of		
Obverse	Reverse	Value	Dimensions	Main colour	Obverse	Reverse	Signature	Watermark	Serial	Note	Issue date	Withdrawal date
		Rp5	135 × 65 mm	Green and red	Javanese woman doing batik	Central Java traditional house	Loekman Hakim (Governor), TRB Sabaroedin (Director)	Banteng head	3 letters, 6 numbers	"1958"	8 September 1959	13 June 1966
		Rp10	135 × 65 mm	Brown and blue	Balinese statue carver	Balinese house	Loekman Hakim (Governor), TRB Sabaroedin (Director)	Banteng head	3 letters, 6 numbers	"1958"	11 December 1961	13 June 1966
		Rp25	150 × 75 mm	Green and blue	Batak Toba weaver	Batak house	Loekman Hakim (Governor), TRB Sabaroedin (Director)	Banteng head	3 letters, 6 numbers	"1958"	26 April 1962	13 June 1966
		Rp50	150 × 75 mm	Orange and purple	Timor spinner	Timor house and cattle pen	Loekman Hakim (Governor), TRB Sabaroedin (Director)	Banteng head	3 letters, 6 numbers	"1958"	26 April 1962	13 June 1966
		Rp100	150 × 75 mm	Red	Rubber tapper	Kalimantan traditional house	Loekman Hakim (Governor), TRB Sabaroedin (Director)	Banteng head	3 letters, 6 numbers	"1958"	8 September 1959	13 June 1966
		Rp500	160 × 85 mm	Red and brown	Man opening coconut	Minahasa house	Loekman Hakim (Governor), TRB Sabaroedin (Director)	Banteng head	3 letters, 5 numbers	"1958"	16 January 1961	13 March 1966
		Rp1,000	160 × 85 mm	Violet and green	Minangkabau silversmith	Minangkabau house	Loekman Hakim (Governor), TRB Sabaroedin (Director)	Banteng head	3 letters, 5 numbers	"1958"	2 May 1961	13 March 1966
		Rp5,000	170 × 95 mm	Brown and green	Woman with paddy	Rice fields in mountain	Loekman Hakim (Governor), TRB Sabaroedin (Director)	Banteng head	3 letters, 5 numbers	"1958"	18 October 1963	13 January 1966
		Rp10,000	170 × 95 mm	Red and brown	2 fishermen with fish trap	Barito river Kalimantan	Jusuf Muda Dalam (Governor), Hertatijanto (Director)	Banteng head	3 letters, 5 numbers	"1964"	18 August 1964	13 January 1966
These images are to scale at 0.7 pixel per millimetre (18 pixel per inch). For table standards, see the banknote specification table.

=== Updates to the crafts notes (1965) ===
In 1965, amid soaring inflation, all of the notes, with the exception of the bottom Rp5 and the Rp500 note of the handicrafts series, were revised and re-issued, some more than once.

Native crafts/houses banknotes, printed by Pertjetakan Kebajoran, issued 1965 – second series
Image		Value	Dimensions	Main colour	Description					date of		
Obverse	Reverse	Value	Dimensions	Main colour	Obverse	Reverse	Signature	Watermark	Serial	Note	Issue date	Withdrawal date
		Rp10	As first series	As first series	As first series		Soemarno, Hertatijanto	As first series	As first series	"1963"	15 October 1964	13 June 1966
		Rp25	As first series	As first series	As first series		Jusuf Muda Dalam, Hertaijanto	None – overprinted Gardua Pancasila	As first series	"1964"	21 May 1965	13 June 1966
		Rp50	As first series	As first series	As first series		Jusuf Muda Dalam, Hertaijanto	None – overprinted Gardua Pancasila	As first series	"1964"	27 April 1965	13 June 1966
		Rp100	As first series	As first series	As first series		Jusuf Muda Dalam, Hertaijanto	As first series	As first series	"1964"	10 March 1965	13 June 1966
		Rp100	As first series	Blue	As first series		Jusuf Muda Dalam, Hertaijanto	None – overprinted Gardua Pancasila	As first series	"1964"	19 November 1965	13 June 1966
		Rp1,000	As first series	Red	As first series		As first series	As first series	As first series	"1958" (As first series)	21 May 1965	13 March 1966
		Rp5,000	As first series	Purple	As first series		As first series	As first series plus overprinted Garuda Pancasila	As first series	"1958" (As first series)	19 November 1965	13 January 1966
		Rp10,000	As first series	Green	As first series		As first series	As first series	As first series	"1964"(As first series)	29 March 1965	13 January 1966
		Rp10,000	As first series	Green	As first series		As first series	As first series plus overprinted Garuda Pancasila	As first series	"1964"(As first series)	19 November 1965	13 January 1966
These images are to scale at 0.7 pixel per millimetre (18 pixel per inch). For table standards, see the banknote specification table.

=== First redenomination (1965) ===
The hyperinflation of the early 1960s made the government redenominate the rupiah for the first time, with one new rupiah worth 1,000 of the old. Such move meant the issue of an entirely new set of banknotes by the Presidential Decree of 13 December 1965 which authorised Bank Indonesia to issue fractional notes for the first time (although the Rp1 and Rp2½ notes were still issued by the government itself) in denominations of 1, 5, 10, 25, and 50 cents depicting volunteers (sukarelawan), all of which are dated 1964; these fractional notes, except for the one cent, were demonetised on 15 November 1996 and remain exchangeable in Bank Indonesia until 2029. Continued inflation throughout 1965 and 1966, with rates up to more than 650%, rendered them worthless upon issue. Meanwhile, notes of Rp1 and higher featured President Sukarno on their obverses and various dancers on their reverses, with the 1964-dated Rp1 and Rp2½ banknotes being issued by Republik Indonesia and the 1960-dated Rp5, Rp10, Rp25, Rp50, and Rp100 notes being issued by Bank Indonesia. (1960-dated Bank Indonesia notes of Rp5, Rp10, and Rp100 rupiah were already circulating in Irian Jaya and the Riau Islands along with 1961-dated Republik Indonesia notes of Rp1 and Rp2½ in those same places).

To complete the redenomination process, older notes with values from Rp500 through Rp10,000 were withdrawn throughout 1965 and 1966.

By 1967, it had proved necessary to add Rp500 and Rp1,000 rupiah notes in the same design due to that year's 112% inflation rate.

Notes of the 'new rupiah' (1965 redenomination), Republik Indonesia
Image		Value	Dimensions	Main colour	Description						date of			
Obverse	Reverse	Value	Dimensions	Main colour	Obverse	Reverse	Serial	Signature	Printer's mark	Watermark	Note	Issue date	Withdrawal date	Replacement note
		Rp1	120 × 60 mm	Red	Sukarno with sugar cane	Balinese female dancer	2 letters, 6 numbers (no printer mark); 3 letters 6 numbers (otherwise)	Soemarno	Pertjetakan Kebajoran, P.N. Pertjetakan Kebajoran, or no mark	Garuda Pancasila	"1964"	13 December 1965		8 January 1968 – as Bank Indonesia. These are the last government notes in Indonesia.
		Rp2½	120 × 60 mm	Blue	Sukarno with sugar cane	Balinese female dancer	2 letters, 6 numbers (no printer mark); 3 letters 6 numbers (otherwise)	Soemarno	Pertjetakan Kebajoran, or no mark	Garuda Pancasila	"1964"	13 December 1965		8 January 1968 – as Bank Indonesia. These are the last government notes in Indonesia.
These images are to scale at 0.7 pixel per millimetre (18 pixel per inch). For table standards, see the banknote specification table.

"New rupiah" (1965/1967), Government of Indonesia/Bank Indonesia
Image		Value	Dimensions	Main colour	Description						date of			
Obverse	Reverse	Value	Dimensions	Main colour	Obverse	Reverse	Serial	Signatures	Printer's mark	Watermark	Note	Issue date	Withdrawal date	Replacement note
		Rp0.01	104 × 52 mm	Green	Farmer wearing paddy hat	Spiral patterns	3 letters, 6 numbers	Governor: Jusuf Muda Dalam; Director: Hertatijianto	Pertjetakan Kebajoran	None	"1964"	13 December 1965	Never withdrawn	Worthless upon issue, never replaced as coin or note
		Rp0.05	104 × 52 mm	Violet	Woman with peaked cap and 'Sukarelawan' (volunteer) badge	Spiral patterns	3 letters, 6 numbers	Governor: Jusuf Muda Dalam; Director: Hertatijianto	Pertjetakan Kebajoran	None	"1964"	13 December 1965	15 November 1996	Worthless upon issue, never replaced as coin or note
		Rp0.10	104 × 52 mm	Blue	Woman with peaked cap and 'Sukarelawan' (volunteer) badge	Spiral patterns	3 letters, 6 numbers	Governor: Jusuf Muda Dalam; Director: Hertatijianto	Pertjetakan Kebajoran	None	"1964"	13 December 1965	15 November 1996	Worthless upon issue, never replaced as coin or note
		Rp0.25	110 × 55 mm	Red	Man with peaked cap and 'Sukarelawan' (volunteer) badge	Spiral patterns	3 letters, 6 numbers	Governor: Jusuf Muda Dalam; Director: Hertatijianto	Pertjetakan Kebajoran	None	"1964"	13 December 1965	15 November 1996	Worthless upon issue, never replaced as coin or note
		Rp0.50	110 × 55 mm	Purple	Man with peaked cap and 'Sukarelawan' (volunteer) badge	Spiral patterns	3 letters, 6 numbers	Governor: Jusuf Muda Dalam; Director: Hertatijianto	Pertjetakan Kebajoran	None	"1964"	13 December 1965	15 November 1996	Worthless upon issue, never replaced as coin or note
		Rp5	135 × 67 mm	Violet	Sukarno, with sugar cane	Female Balinese dancer	3 letters, 6 numbers	Acting Governor: Soetikno Slamet; Director: Indra Kasoema	Pertjetakan Kebajoran	Sukarno, replaced by buffalo from 30 August 1966	"1960"	13 December 1965	1 September 1971	13 January 1969
		Rp10	140 × 70 mm	Brown	Sukarno, with sugar cane	2 female Balinese dancers	3 letters, 6 numbers	Acting Governor: Soetikno Slamet; Director: Indra Kasoema	Pertjetakan Kebajoran	Sukarno	"1960"	13 December 1965	1 September 1971	15 April 1968
		Rp25	146 × 73 mm	Green	Sukarno, with sugar cane	Female Balinese dancer showing hands	3 letters, 6 numbers (Pertjetakan); 1/2/3 letters, six numbers (Thomas De La Rue)	Acting Governor: Soetikno Slamet; Director: Indra Kasoema	Thomas De La Rue until 25 July 1966, then Pertjetakan Kebajoran	Sukarno (Thomas De La Rue); buffalo (Pertjetakan Kebajoran)	"1960"	13 December 1965	1 September 1971	13 January 1969
		Rp50	152 × 76 mm	Navy Blue	Sukarno, with sugar cane	Hindu female Balinese dancer with 2 gamelan players	3 letters, 6 numbers (Pertjetakan); 1/2/3 letters, six numbers (Thomas De La Rue)	Acting Governor: Soetikno Slamet; Director: Indra Kasoema	Thomas De La Rue until 30 August 1966, then Pertjetakan Kebajoran	Sukarno (Thomas De La Rue); buffalo (Pertjetakan Kebajoran)	"1960"	13 December 1965	1 September 1971	13 January 1969
		Rp100	158 × 79 mm	Red-brown	Sukarno, with sugar cane	Batak male and female dancer	3 letters, 6 numbers	Acting Governor: Soetikno Slamet; Director: Indra Kasoema	Pertjetakan Kebajoran	Sukarno	"1960"	13 December 1965	1 September 1971	13 January 1969
		Rp500	164 × 82 mm	Brown	Sukarno, with sugar cane	Javanese dancers	1/2/3 letters 4 numbers (TDLR), 3 letters six numbers (PK)	Acting Governor: Soetikno Slamet; Director: Indra Kasoema	Thomas De La Rue/Pertjetakan Kebajoran	First Printings: Sukarno (Thomas De La Rue), buffalo/Sukarno (Pertjetakan Kebajoran); 1968 reprint Garuda (Pertjetakan Kebajoran)	"1960"	20 February 1967	1 September 1971	13 January 1969
		Rp1,000	170 × 85 mm	Cyan	Sukarno, with sugar cane	2 Balinese dancers	1/2/3 letters 4 numbers (TDLR), 3 letters six numbers (PK)	Acting Governor: Soetikno Slamet; Director: Indra Kasoema	Thomas De La Rue/Pertjetakan Kebajoran	Sukarno (Thomas De La Rue – first printing), buffalo (Pertjetakan Kebajoran – 1968 reprint)	"1960"	20 February 1967	1 September 1971	13 January 1969
		Rp2,500	184 × 88 mm	Blue	Sukarno, with sugar cane	Female dancer	1 letter 4 numbers	Governor: Soemarno; Director: Roesli Saleh S. H.	Thomas De La Rue		"1960"	Unissued specimens		
		Rp5,000	184 × 88 mm	Purple	Sukarno, with sugar cane	Female dancer	1 letter 4 numbers	Governor: Soemarno; Director: Roesli Saleh S. H.	Thomas De La Rue		"1960"	Unissued specimens		
These images are to scale at 0.7 pixel per millimetre (18 pixel per inch). For table standards, see the banknote specification table.

== New Order (1966–1998) ==
=== Sudirman series (Direksi 1968) ===
By 1968, after President Suharto's New Order had been established, Bank Indonesia was given the sole right to issue banknotes (including notes below 5 rupiah) as well as coins (which had previously been the issue of the central government).

As such, Bank Indonesia assumed responsibility for the issuance of all denominations of the 1968 series of the rupiah, with all notes being printed by Pertjetakan Kebajoran with the imprint date of 1968 with values ranging from Rp1 to Rp1,000. The notes featured the revolutionary hero General Sudirman on all of their obverses, while their reverse depicts various scenes of industrial activities. The notes were issued in 1968 and 1969. In 1970, notes of the same theme (but a different watermark) were added in Rp5,000 and Rp10,000 denominations, thus restoring all notes to the same denominations prior to the 1965 redenomination.

Sudirman series (Direksi 1968), printed by PN Pertjetakan Kebajoran
Image		Value	Dimensions	Main colour	Description					Date of		
Obverse	Reverse	Value	Dimensions	Main colour	Obverse	Reverse	Serial	Signatures	Watermark	Issue date	Withdrawal date	Replacement note
		Rp1	112 × 56 mm	Orange	Sudirman, Coat of arms of Indonesia	Woman extracting copra	3 letters, 6 numbers	Radius Prawiro, Soeksmono B. Martokoesoemo	Garuda Pancasila	8 January 1968	1 September 1975	Replaced with coin
		Rp2½	112 × 56 mm	Blue	Sudirman, Coat of arms of Indonesia	Woman holding paddy	3 letters, 6 numbers	Radius Prawiro, Soeksmono B. Martokoesoemo	Garuda Pancasila	8 January 1968	1 September 1975	Last of denomination
		Rp5	132 × 66 mm	Violet	Sudirman, Coat of arms of Indonesia	Hydropower construction	3 letters, 6 numbers	Radius Prawiro, Soeksmono B. Martokoesoemo	Garuda Pancasila	13 January 1969	1 September 1975	Replaced with coin
		Rp10	132 × 66 mm	Brown	Sudirman, Coat of arms of Indonesia	Oil refinery	3 letters, 6 numbers	Radius Prawiro, Soeksmono B. Martokoesoemo	Garuda Pancasila	15 April 1968	1 September 1975	Replaced with coin
		Rp25	132 × 66 mm	Green	Sudirman, Coat of arms of Indonesia	Ampera Bridge, Palembang	3 letters, 6 numbers	Radius Prawiro, Soeksmono B. Martokoesoemo	Garuda Pancasila	13 January 1969	1 September 1975	Replaced with coin
		Rp50	132 × 66 mm	Violet and green	Sudirman, Coat of arms of Indonesia	DC-3s inside hangar	3 letters, 6 numbers	Radius Prawiro, Soeksmono B. Martokoesoemo	Garuda Pancasila	13 January 1969	1 September 1975	Replaced with coin
		Rp100	144 × 72 mm	Red	Sudirman, Coat of arms of Indonesia	Brickworks, harbour	3 letters, 6 numbers	Radius Prawiro, Soeksmono B. Martokoesoemo	Garuda Pancasila	13 January 1969	2 April 1988	1 October 1977
		Rp500	144 × 72 mm	Green and black	Sudirman, Coat of arms of Indonesia	Cotton mill	3 letters, 6 numbers	Radius Prawiro, Soeksmono B. Martokoesoemo	Garuda Pancasila	13 January 1969	2 April 1988	5 April 1978
		Rp1,000	144 × 72 mm	Black and orange	Sudirman, Coat of arms of Indonesia	Fertiliser factory	3 letters, 6 numbers	Radius Prawiro, Soeksmono B. Martokoesoemo	Garuda Pancasila	13 January 1969	1 September 1977	1 June 1976
		Rp5,000	156 × 78 mm	Green	Sudirman, Garuda Pancasila	PT Tonasa Cement Factory	3 letters, 6 numbers	Radius Prawiro, Soeksmono B. Martokoesoemo	Diponegoro	2 April 1970	1 July 1977	5 October 1976
		Rp10,000	156 × 78 mm	Red and violet	Sudirman, Garuda Pancasila	Bangka Island tin mine	3 letters, 6 numbers	Radius Prawiro, Soeksmono B. Martokoesoemo	Diponegoro	2 April 1970	1 July 1977	15 July 1976
These images are to scale at 0.7 pixel per millimetre (18 pixel per inch). For table standards, see the banknote specification table.

=== Diponegoro series (unissued) ===
A new series of notes, which now started only at Rp100 (then US$0.24), was designed with a Diponegoro theme in 1971 (but undated); however, this series was never issued, although the Rp1,000 note, with date added, was issued in 1976 (see below), and the reverse of the Rp5,000 note was also used for the 1976 Rp5,000 note, but with a new obverse design. If issued, this aborted note series was the last in Indonesia to have a consistent theme, although new notes typically retained the same colour as old ones of the same denomination. As of 2024, this is the most recent rupiah series to be completely unissued.

Diponegoro series, unissued
Image		Value	Dimensions	Main colour	Description					Date of			Remarks
Obverse	Reverse	Value	Dimensions	Main colour	Obverse	Reverse	Watermark	Signature	Serial	Issue date	Withdrawal date	Replacement	Remarks
		Rp100	143 × 70 mm	Pink	Diponegoro at right, facing left	Mountain scenery	Diponegoro	Radius Prawiro (Governor), Durmawel Achmad (Director)	2 letters, 000000	Specimen only; unissued; undated			
		Rp500	144 × 71 mm	Green	Diponegoro at left, facing right	Rice terraces	Diponegoro	Radius Prawiro (Governor), Durmawel Achmad (Director)	3 letters, six numbers	Specimen only; unissued; undated			
		Rp1,000	156 × 78 mm	Blue	Diponegoro at left, facing right	Buffalo ploughing rice field	Diponegoro	Radius Prawiro (Governor), Durmawel Achmad (Director)	3 letters, six numbers	Specimen only; unissued; undated			
		Rp5,000	158 × 79 mm	Brown and red-brown	Diponegoro at right, facing left	3 sailing boats	Diponegoro	Radius Prawiro (Governor), Durmawel Achmad (Director)	2 letters, 000000	Specimen only; unissued; undated			
		Rp10,000	158 × 79 mm	Green and red	Diponegoro at right, facing left	Rice farmers	Diponegoro	Radius Prawiro (Governor), Durmawel Achmad (Director)	2 letters, 000000	Specimen only; unissued; undated			
These images are to scale at 0.7 pixel per millimetre (18 pixel per inch). For table standards, see the banknote specification table.

=== 1975/1977 series ===
Starting in 1975, Perum Peruri took over the responsibility for printing rupiah notes from Pertjetakan Kebajoran.

Due to counterfeiting of the Sudirman notes, the Rp1,000, Rp5,000 and Rp10,000 notes were all re-designed, dated 1975, and issued in 1976. The Sudirman notes of Rp1,000 and above were withdrawn as legal tender as of 1 September 1977.

Redesigns of the Rp100 and Rp500 notes followed in 1978, thereby completing the third series of notes to be issued since the 1965 devaluation.

1975/1977 series, printed by Perum Peruri
Image		Value	Dimensions	Main colour	Description					Date of				Remarks
Obverse	Reverse	Value	Dimensions	Main colour	Obverse	Reverse	Watermark	Signature	Serial	note	Issue date	Withdrawal date	Replacement	Remarks
		Rp100	144 × 72 mm	Pink	Javan rhinoceros	A Javan rhino in habitat	Garuda Pancasila	Rachmat Saleh (Governor), Arifin M. Siregar (Director)	3 letters, six numbers	"1977"	1 October 1977	2 April 1988	1 February 1985	
		Rp500	144 × 72 mm	Green	Rachmi Hatta with Vanda orchid	Bank Indonesia building, Thamrin, Jakarta	Bank Indonesia building	Rachmat Saleh (Governor), Arifin M. Siregar (Director)	3 letters, six numbers	"1977"	5 April 1978	2 April 1988	1 December 1982	
		Rp1,000	158 × 79 mm	Blue	Diponegoro at left, facing right	Buffalo ploughing rice field	Gajah Mada	Rachmat Saleh (Governor), Soeksmono. B. Martokoesoemo (Director)	3 letters, six numbers	"1975"	1 June 1976	2 April 1988	1 July 1980	Undated specimens exists; issued note dated '1975'
		Rp5,000	158 × 79 mm	Red-brown	Fisherman	3 sailing boats	Cut Nyak Dhien	Rachmat Saleh (Governor), Soeksmono. B. Martokoesoemo (Director)	3 letters, six numbers	"1975"	5 October 1976	2 April 1988	1 March 1982	Identical to unissued 'Diponegoro' note, except Diponegoro replaced with fisherman
		Rp10,000	158 × 79 mm	Green, brown and orange	Ramayana frieze at Borobodur	Batara Kala, Jago Temple	General Sudirman	Rachmat Saleh (Governor), Soeksmono. B. Martokoesoemo (Director)	3 letters, six numbers	"1975"	15 July 1976	2 January 1980	29 June 1979	
These images are to scale at 0.7 pixel per millimetre (18 pixel per inch). For table standards, see the banknote specification table.

=== 1979/1980/1982 series ===
The first note to be replaced was again the top 10,000 rupiah note (by then worth approximately US$16), in 1979. Further redesigned notes followed in all denominations except the 100 rupiah, in 1980 and 1982.

1979/1980/1982 series, printed by Perum Peruri
Image		Value	Dimensions	Main colour	Description					Date of			
Obverse	Reverse	Value	Dimensions	Main colour	Obverse	Reverse	Watermark	Signatures	Serial	note	Issue date	Withdrawal date	Replacement
		Rp500	140 × 68 mm	Green	Titan arum	Bank Indonesia building, Kota Tua	Ahmad Yani	Rachmat Saleh, Durmawel Achmad	3 letters, six numbers	"1982"	1 December 1982	1 May 1992	29 January 1988
		Rp1,000	146 × 72 mm	Blue	Soetomo	Sianok Canyon	Hasanuddin of Gowa	Rachmat Saleh, Durmawel Achmad	3 letters, six numbers	"1980"	1 July 1980	1 May 1992	30 June 1987
		Rp5,000	152 × 76 mm	Brown	Diamond cutter, Kalimantan	3 Toraja houses	Dewi Sartika	Rachmat Saleh, Durmawel Achmad	3 letters, six numbers	"1980"	1 March 1982	1 May 1992	9 December 1986
		Rp10,000	158 × 80 mm	Purple	Gamelan players, Central Java	Prambanan temple	Soetomo	Rachmat Saleh, Arifin M. Siregar	3 letters, six numbers	"1979"	29 June 1979	1 May 1992	27 December 1985
These images are to scale at 0.7 pixel per millimetre (18 pixel per inch). For table standards, see the banknote specification table.

=== 1984–1988 series ===
The Rp100 note was replaced in 1984 with a new design featuring the Goura victoria on its obverse and the Sigura-gura dam in Asahan, North Sumatera, on its reverse with the national coat of arms as its watermark; replacement notes of all denominations followed in 1985 (Rp10,000), 1986 (Rp5,000), 1987 (Rp1,000) and 1988 (Rp500). All notes of this series were updated on 28 December 1992 and were subsequently demonetised on 25 September 1995.

1984-1988 series, printed by Perum Peruri, circulated 1984-1992
Image		Value	Dimensions	Main colour	Description					Date of			
Obverse	Reverse	Value	Dimensions	Main colour	Obverse	Reverse	Watermark	Signatures	Serial	note	Issue date	Withdrawal date	Replacement
		Rp100	133 × 64 mm	Pink	Victoria crowned pigeon	Asahan dam	Garuda Pancasila	Arifin M. Siregar, Sujitno Siswowidagdo	3 letters, six numbers	"1984"	1 February 1985	25 September 1995	28 December 1992
		Rp500	140 × 68 mm	Green	Javan deer	Bank Indonesia building, Cirebon	Ahmad Yani	Arifin M. Siregar, Sujitno Siswowidagdo	3 letters, six numbers	"1988"	29 January 1988	25 September 1995	28 December 1992
		Rp1,000	147 × 73 mm	Blue	Sisingamangaraja XII	Kraton Yogyakarta	Sultan Hasanuddin	Arifin M. Siregar, Sujitno Siswowidagdo	3 letters, six numbers	"1987"	30 June 1987	25 September 1995	28 December 1992
		Rp5,000	152 × 76 mm	Brown	Teuku Umar	Minaret of Menara Kudus Mosque	Martha Christina Tiahahu	Arifin M. Siregar, Sujitno Siswowidagdo	3 letters, six numbers	"1986"	9 December 1986	25 September 1995	28 December 1992
		Rp10,000	158 × 80 mm	Purple	Kartini with Prambanan temple	Female university graduate, Indonesian flag	Tjipto Mangunkusumo	Arifin M. Siregar, Sujitno Siswowidagdo	3 letters, six numbers	"1985"	27 December 1985	25 September 1995	28 December 1992
These images are to scale at 0.7 pixel per millimetre (18 pixel per inch). For table standards, see the banknote specification table.

=== 1992/1993/1995 series ===
On 28 December 1992, Bank Indonesia completely overhauled of all denominations of notes for the first time since 1968. In addition, a new top denomination, Rp20,000 note was added, with a US$ value of approximately $10 at the time. This was the first new denomination of the 'new rupiah' since the Rp10,000 had been issued in April 1970 (then worth about US$26). From this issue forwards, Indonesian notes have carried in small text in the note border the year of printing; the most conspicuous date on the note is still the date of authority (e.g., "Direksi 1992").

On 16 February 1993 a new top denomination, Rp50,000 (approx US$22), celebrating "25 Years of Development" was issued. The design featured Suharto on the front and Soekarno-Hatta airport on the back, with a plane taking off to symbolise Indonesia's growth. It also featured a hologram with the BI's logo as an added security feature. The notes (regular) were printed in 1993 and 1994. A polymer version intended as collectables were also issued (see Commemorative banknotes).

In 1995, a segmented security thread was introduced to the Rp20,000 and Rp50,000 notes as an anti-counterfeiting measure, the first ever for the rupiah. Such notes were imprinted as 'Direksi 1995.'

All notes of this series were demonetised on 21 August 2000, except for the banknotes from Rp100 to Rp5000, which were demonetised on 30 November 2006.

1992/1993/1995 series, printed by Perum Peruri, circulated 1992-1998
Image		Value	Dimensions	Main colour	Description					Date of			Remarks
Obverse	Reverse	Value	Dimensions	Main colour	Obverse	Reverse	Watermark	Signatures	Serial	Issue date	Replacement	Withdrawal date	Remarks
		Rp100	136 × 68 mm	Pink	Bugis phinisi	Anak Krakatoa	Ki Hajar Dewantara	Adrianus Mooy (Governor), Sujitno Siswowidagdo (Director)	Three letters, six numbers	28 December 1992	Last of denomination	30 November 2006	Carries imprint dates 1992–1996, 1999, 2000
		Rp500	140 × 68 mm	Green	Orangutan	East Kalimantan house	Oemar Said Tjokroaminoto	Adrianus Mooy (Governor), Syahril Sabirin (Director)	Three letters, six numbers	28 December 1992	Last of denomination	30 November 2006	Carries imprint date 1992–1999
		Rp1,000	144 × 68 mm	Blue	Lake Toba	Stone jumping, Nias	Cut Nyak Meutia	Adrianus Mooy (Governor), Hendrobudiyanto (Director)	Three letters, six numbers	28 December 1992	29 November 2000	30 November 2006	Carries imprint date 1992–2000
		Rp5,000	144 × 72 mm	Brown	Sasando Rote	Tri-coloured lake, Kelimutu	Cut Nyak Meutia	Adrianus Mooy (Governor), Hasudungan Tampubolon (Director)	Three letters, six numbers	10 February 1992	6 November 2001	30 November 2006	Carries imprint date 1992–2001
		Rp10,000	148 × 72 mm	Purple	Hamengkubuwono IX, Scouts camping	Borobodur	Wage Rudolf Soepratman	Adrianus Mooy (Governor), R. Rachmad (Director)	Three letters, six numbers	18 August 1992	23 January 1998	21 August 2000	Carries imprint date 1992–1998
		Rp20,000	152 × 72 mm	Green	Red bird-of-paradise	Clove flower, map of Indonesia	Ki Hajar Dewantara	Adrianus Mooy (Governor), Binhadi (Director)	Three letters, six numbers	10 February 1992	28 August 1995	21 August 2000	Carries imprint dates 1992–1995
		Rp20,000	152 × 72 mm	Green	Red bird-of-paradise	Clove flower, map of Indonesia	Ki Hajar Dewantara + security foil strip	J. Soedradjad Djiwandono (Governor), Heru Soepraptomo (Director)	Three letters, six numbers	28 August 1995	18 February 1998	21 August 2000	Imprint dates 1995–1997
		Rp50,000	152 × 76 mm	Blue	Suharto with scenes of economic and social-cultural development of Indonesia, slogan "25 Tahun Indonesia Membangun" (25 Years of Indonesia's Development)	Garuda Indonesia Boeing 747 Aircraft taking off from Soekarno-Hatta International Airport	Wage Rudolf Soepratman	Adrianus Mooy (Governor), T. M. Sjakur Machmud (Director)	Three letters, six numbers	1 March 1993	28 August 1995	21 August 2000	Imprint dates 1993-1994
		Rp50,000	152 × 76 mm	Blue	Suharto with scenes of economic and social-cultural development of Indonesia, slogan "25 Tahun Indonesia Membangun" (25 Years of Indonesia's Development)	Garuda Indonesia Boeing 747 Aircraft taking off from Soekarno-Hatta International Airport	Wage Rudolf Soepratman + security foil strip	J. Soedradjad Djiwandono (Governor), Boediono (Director)	Three letters, six numbers	28 August 1995	1 June 1999	21 August 2000	Imprint dates 1995–1998
These images are to scale at 0.7 pixel per millimetre (18 pixel per inch). For table standards, see the banknote specification table.

== The final New Order and Reformation (1998–present) ==
=== 1998/1999 series ===
In 1998, during the final months of the New Order, the Rp10,000 and Rp20,000 notes were redesigned on 23 January and 19 February 1998 respectively, while the Rp50,000 note were redesigned on 1 June 1999, the first during the reformation. The new Rp10,000 and Rp20,000 notes now feature a latent image that shows the text "BI" when viewed at a certain angle as an added security feature.

Then-Senior Deputy Governor of Bank Indonesia Mirza Adityaswara's prediction of an increase of demand in cash to anticipate the Year 2000 problem led to the introduction of a new polymer Rp100,000 note on 1 November 1999, with five hundred million notes (totalling Rp500 billion) of this denomination being ordered from Note Printing Australia. This marked the first time the former president Sukarno appeared on an Indonesian banknote since 1967 and also the first banknote in Indonesian history featured former vice president Mohammad Hatta.

All notes of this series are no longer legal tender since 31 December 2008 and were exchangeable at commercial banks until 30 December 2013 and at Bank Indonesia offices until 30 December 2018.

Rupiah notes "1998", "1999" series																
Image		Value	Dimensions	Main colour	Description						Date of					Remarks
Obverse	Reverse	Value	Dimensions	Main colour	Obverse	Reverse	Watermark	Signatures	Printer	Serial	Issue date	note series	first of denomination	Withdrawal date	replacement	Remarks
		Rp10,000	148 × 72 mm	Brown-grey	Tjut Njak Dhien	Lake Segara Anak	Wage Rudolf Soepratman; security thread	J. Soedradjad Djiwandono (Governor), Mukhlis Rasyid (Deputy Governor)	Perum Peruri	3 letters, 6 numbers	23 January 1998	'1998'	1964	31 December 2008	20 October 2005	Carries imprint date 1998–2005
		Rp20,000	152 × 72 mm	Green	Ki Hadjar Dewantara, Ganesha	Teacher and children in classroom	Ki Hadjar Dewantara; security thread	J. Soedradjad Djiwandono (Governor), Haryono (Deputy Governor)	Perum Peruri	3 letters, 6 numbers	19 February 1998	'1998'	1992	31 December 2008	29 December 2004	Carries imprint date 1998–2004
		Rp50,000	152 × 72 mm	Grey-green	Wage Rudolf Soepratman	Indonesian flag hoisting ceremony, 17 August 1997	Oemar Said Tjokroaminoto; security thread	Syahril Sabirin (Governor), Dono Iskandar Djojosoebroto (Deputy Governor)	Perum Peruri	3 letters, 6 numbers	1 June 1999	'1999'	1993	31 December 2008	20 October 2005	Carries imprint dates 1999–2005
		Rp100,000	151 × 65 mm	Red, yellow, and blue	Sukarno and Mohammad Hatta, proclamation of independence	Indonesian Parliament building, Jakarta	Garuda Pancasila and the logo of Bank Indonesia; security thread	Syahril Sabirin (Governor), Iwan R. Prawiranata (Deputy Governor)	Note Printing Australia; Note Printing Works Bank of Thailand	3 letters, 6 numbers	1 November 1999	'1999'	First of denomination	31 December 2008	29 December 2004	No imprint date; phosphorus number for security
These images are to scale at 0.7 pixel per millimetre (18 pixel per inch). For table standards, see the banknote specification table.

=== 2000–2014 series ===
The lower denominations, Rp1,000 and Rp5,000, were updated in 2000 and 2001. While the Rp5,000 note is still being printed, the Rp1,000 note was last issued dated 2013 (a limited number of notes dated 2016 were issued later) and, while remaining in circulation, has largely been replaced by a coin of the same value.

The Rp20,000 and Rp100,000 notes were redesigned on 29 December 2004, while the Rp10,000 and Rp50,000 notes were redesigned on 20 October 2005. The Rp100,000 note's material was switched to paper as bank machines have difficulty counting the polymer notes of 1999. All the notes were given better security features, including a segmented security thread and colour-shifting ink, with the Rp100,000 note also given an Irisafe technology to its right which was removed in 2011.

A new denomination, Rp2,000, was issued on 9 July 2009 after several delays following an initial announcement that said note would replace the Rp1,000 note as the lowest note in circulation. However, the latter continued to be printed, most recently in 2022.

On 20 July 2010, the 2005-issue Rp10,000 note was revised, featuring the same theme but with a colour change to purple in order to better distinguish it from the Rp100,000 note. Several changes were also made to the note's security features and devices, including the addition of omron rings and a circle-shaped blind code. The following year, in commemoration of that year's Youth Pledge Day on 28 October 2011, Bank Indonesia updated the Rp20,000, Rp50,000, and Rp100,000 banknotes to feature enhanced security features including rainbow printing, omron rings and new blind codes.

Bank Indonesia further updated the Rp100,000 note on 17 August 2014 to deter counterfeiting. These banknotes, which bear the text "Negara Kesatuan Republik Indonesia" ("The Unitary State of the Republic of Indonesia") instead of "Bank Indonesia," still retain the images of the same national figures but have more golden colours and carry an imprint of TE. (abbreviation of "Tahun Emisi", Issue Year) 2014 and the signatures of the then-BI governor Agus Martowardojo and the then-Indonesian Finance Minister Chatib Basri.

That same year, President Susilo Bambang Yudhoyono has officially appointed Sukarno and Mohammad Hatta as obverse of Rp100,000 banknotes, following the issuance of Presidential Decree No. 22 of 2 June 2014.

Rupiah notes '2000', '2001', '2004', (Note: including revised versions which was issued in 2011.) '2005', (Note: including revised versions which was issued in 2010 and 2011.) '2009', and '2014' series, Printed by Perum Peruri
Image		Value	Dimensions	Main colour	Description					Date of				Remarks
Obverse	Reverse	Value	Dimensions	Main colour	Obverse	Reverse	Watermark	Signatures	Serial	Issue	Note Series	Withdrawal	Replacement	Remarks
		Rp1,000	141 × 65 mm	Blue and Green	Kapitan Pattimura	Maitara and Tidore Islands, with fishermen on a boat	Tjut Meutia	Varies (Note: 2000–2008: Anwar Nasution (Senior Deputy Governor) — Aulia Pohan (Deputy Governor); 2009: Boediono (Governor) — Budi Mulya (Deputy Governor); 2011–2013: Darmin Nasution (Governor) — Budi Mulya (Deputy Governor); 2016: Agus Martowardojo (Governor) — Perry Warjiyo (Deputy Governor))	3 letters, 6 numbers	29 November 2000	'2000'	Current	19 December 2016	Imprint 2000–2009, 2011-2013, and 2016
		Rp2,000	141 × 65 mm	Grey	Pangeran Antasari of Banjar	Dayak traditional dance	Pangeran Antasari	Varies (Note: 2009: Miranda Goeltom (Senior Deputy Governor) — Budi Rochadi (Deputy Governor); 2010–2013: Darmin Nasution (Governor) — Budi Rochadi (Deputy Governor); 2014–2016: Agus Martowardojo (Governor) — Mirza Adityaswara (Deputy Governor))	3 letters, 6 numbers	9 July 2009	'2009'	Current	19 December 2016	Imprint 2009–2016
		Rp5,000	143 × 65 mm	Brown and Green	Tuanku Imam Bonjol	Songket weaver, Tanah Datar	Tjut Meutia	Varies (Note: 2001–2008: Syahril Sabirin (Governor) — Miranda Goeltom (Deputy Governor); 2009: Boediono (Governor) — Ardhayadi Mitroatmodjo (Deputy Governor); 2010–2013: Darmin Nasution (Governor) — Ardhayadi Mitroatmodjo (Deputy Governor); 2013: Darmin Nasution (Governor) — Halim Alamsyah (Deputy Governor); 2014–2016: Agus Martowardojo (Governor) — Hendar (Deputy Governor); 2016: Agus Martowardojo (Governor) — Erwin Rijanto (Deputy Governor))	3 letters, 6 numbers	6 November 2001	'2001'	Current	19 December 2016	Imprint 2001–2016
		Rp10,000	145 × 65 mm	Magenta	Sultan Mahmud Badaruddin II	The traditional Limas House of Palembang, South Sumatra	Sultan Mahmud Badaruddin II	Varies (Note: 2005–2009: Burhanuddin Abdullah (Governor) — Bun Bunan E. J. Hutapea (Deputy Governor); 2009: Boediono (Governor) — Muliaman D. Hadad (Deputy Governor))	3 letters, 6 numbers	20 October 2005	'2005' (Note: including revised version which was issued in 2010.)	Current	20 July 2010	Imprint 2005–2009
		Rp10,000	145 × 65 mm	Purple	Sultan Mahmud Badaruddin II	The traditional Limas House of Palembang, South Sumatra	Sultan Mahmud Badaruddin II	Varies (Note: 2010: Darmin Nasution (Senior Deputy Governor) — Muliaman D. Hadad (Deputy Governor); 2011–2013: Darmin Nasution (Governor) — Muliaman D. Hadad (Deputy Governor); 2013: Darmin Nasution (Governor) — Sarwono (Deputy Governor); 2014–2016: Agus Martowardojo (Governor) — Perry Warjiyo (Deputy Governor); 2016: Agus Martowardojo (Governor) — Hendar (Deputy Governor))	3 letters, 6 numbers	20 July 2010	'2005'	Current	19 December 2016	Imprint 2010–2016
		Rp20,000	147 × 65 mm	Green	Oto Iskandar di Nata	Tea plantation, West Java	Oto Iskandar di Nata	Varies (Note: 2004-2008: Burhanuddin Abdullah (Governor) — Maulana Ibrahim (Deputy Governor); 2009: Boediono (Governor) — Siti CH Fadjirijan (Deputy Governor); 2010-2011: Darmin Nasution (Governor) — Halim Alamsyah (Deputy Governor))	3 letters, 6 numbers	29 December 2004	'2004' (Note: including revised version which was issued in 2011.)	Current	31 October 2011	Imprint 2004–2011
		Rp20,000	147 × 65 mm	Green	Oto Iskandar di Nata	Tea plantation, West Java	Oto Iskandar di Nata	Varies (Note: 2011–2013: Darmin Nasution (Governor) — Halim Alamsyah (Deputy Governor); 2014–2015: Agus Martowardojo (Governor) — Ronald Wass (Deputy Governor); 2016: Agus Martowardojo (Governor) — Perry Warjiyo (Deputy Governor); 2016: Agus Martowardojo (Governor) — Ardhayadi Mitroatmodjo (Deputy Governor))	3 letters, 6 numbers	31 October 2011	'2004'	Current	19 December 2016	Imprint 2011–2016
		Rp50,000	149 × 65 mm	Blue	I Gusti Ngurah Rai	Pura Ulun Danu Bratan, Bali	I Gusti Ngurah Rai	Varies (Note: 2005–2008: Burhanuddin Abdullah (Governor) — Maman H. Soemantri (Deputy Governor); 2009: Boediono (Governor) — Hartadi Sarwono (Deputy Governor); 2010–2011: Darmin Nasution (Governor) — Hartadi Sarwono (Deputy Governor))	3 letters, 6 numbers	20 October 2005	'2005'	Current	31 October 2011	Imprint 2005–2011
		Rp50,000	149 × 65 mm	Blue	I Gusti Ngurah Rai	Pura Ulun Danu Bratan, Bali	I Gusti Ngurah Rai	Varies (Note: 2011–2013: Darmin Nasution (Governor) — Hartati Sarwono (Deputy Governor); 2014–2016: Agus Martowardojo (Governor) — Halim Alamsyah (Deputy Governor); 2016: Agus Martowardojo (Governor) — Ardhayadi Mitroatmodjo (Deputy Governor))	3 letters, 6 numbers	31 October 2011	'2005'	Current	19 December 2016	Imprint 2011-2016
		Rp100,000	151 × 65 mm	Red	Sukarno and Mohammad Hatta, Proclamation of Independence of the Republic of Indonesia	Indonesian Parliament building, Jakarta, Map of Indonesia and without addition text of "Dewan Perwakilan Daerah" (Regional Representative Council)	Wage Rudolf Soepratman	Varies (Note: 2004–2009: Burhanuddin Abdullah (Governor) — Aulia Pohan (Deputy Governor); 2009: Boediono (Governor) — Miranda Goeltom (Deputy Governor); 2010–2011: Darmin Nasution (Governor) — Budi Rochadi (Deputy Governor))	3 letters, 6 numbers	29 December 2004	'2004'	Current	31 October 2011	Imprint 2004–2011
		Rp100,000	151 × 65 mm	Red	Sukarno and Mohammad Hatta, Proclamation of Independence of the Republic of Indonesia	Indonesian Parliament building, Jakarta, Map of Indonesia and with addition text of "Dewan Perwakilan Daerah" (Regional Representative Council)	Wage Rudolf Soepratman	Varies (Note: 2011–2013: Darmin Nasution (Governor) — Ardhayadi Mitroatmodjo (Deputy Governor); 2013: Darmin Nasution (Governor) — Ronald Wass (Deputy Governor); 2014: Agus Martowardojo (Governor) — Mirza Adityaswara (Deputy Governor))	3 letters, 6 numbers	31 October 2011	'2004'	Current	17 August 2014	Imprint 2011–2014
		Rp100,000	151 × 65 mm	Red	Sukarno and Mohammad Hatta, Proclamation of Independence of the Republic of Indonesia	Indonesian Parliament building, Jakarta, Map of Indonesia and with addition text of "Dewan Perwakilan Daerah" (Regional Representative Council)	Wage Rudolf Soepratman	Varies (Note: 2014–2015: Agus Martowardojo (Governor) — Muhamad Chatib Basri (Minister of Finance); 2015–2016: Agus Martowardojo (Governor) — Bambang Brodjonegoro (Minister of Finance))	3 letters, 6 numbers	17 August 2014	'2014'	Current	19 December 2016	Imprint 2014–2016
These images are to scale at 0.7 pixel per millimetre (18 pixel per inch). For table standards, see the banknote specification table.

=== 2016 series ===
On 19 December 2016, Bank Indonesia completely redesigned all rupiah banknotes in the denominations of Rp1,000, Rp2,000, Rp5,000, Rp10,000, Rp20,000, Rp50,000 and Rp100,000. This series features various national heroes from Indonesia's history. In 2022, Bank Indonesia predicted that notes of this series will be removed from circulation in 2025 or 2026.

Rupiah notes '2016' series, Printed by Perum Peruri
Image		Value	Dimensions	Main colour	Description					Date of				Remarks
Obverse	Reverse	Value	Dimensions	Main colour	Obverse	Reverse	Watermark	Signatures	Serial	Note Series	Issue Date	Withdrawal Date	Replacement Date	Remarks
		Rp1,000	141 × 65 mm	Yellow-Grey	Tjut Meutia	Tifa dance, Banda Neira, and Cocktown orchid	Tjut Meutia	Varies (Note: 2016–2018: Agus Martowardojo (Governor) — Sri Mulyani Indrawati (Minister of Finance); 2018–2021: Perry Warjiyo (Governor) — Sri Mulyani Indrawati (Minister of Finance))	3 letters, 6 numbers	'2016'	19 December 2016	Current	17 August 2022	Imprint 2016–2019, 2021
		Rp2,000	141 × 65 mm	Grey	Mohammad Husni Thamrin	Piring dance, Sianok Canyon and Magnolia champaca	Pangeran Antasari	Varies	3 letters, 6 numbers	'2016'	19 December 2016	Current	17 August 2022	Imprint 2016–2021
		Rp5,000	143 × 65 mm	Brown	Idham Chalid	Gambyong dance, Mount Bromo and Tuberose	Tjut Meutia	Varies	3 letters, 6 numbers	'2016'	19 December 2016	Current	17 August 2022	Imprint 2016–2021
		Rp10,000	145 × 65 mm	Purple	Frans Kaisiepo	Pakarena dance, Wakatobi National Park and Magnolia vrieseana	Sultan Mahmud Badaruddin II	Varies	3 letters, 6 numbers	'2016'	19 December 2016	Current	17 August 2022	Imprint 2016–2019, 2021
		Rp20,000	147 × 65 mm	Green	G.S.S.J. Ratulangi	Gong dance, Derawan Islands and Coelogyne pandurata	Otto Iskandar Di Nata	Varies	3 letters, 6 numbers	'2016'	19 December 2016	Current	17 August 2022	Imprint 2016–2019, 2021, 2024
		Rp50,000	149 × 65 mm	Blue	Djuanda Kartawidjaja	Legong dance, Komodo National Park and Plumeria	I Gusti Ngurah Rai	Varies	3 letters, 6 numbers	'2016'	19 December 2016	Current	17 August 2022	Imprint 2016–2021
		Rp100,000	151 × 65 mm	Red	Sukarno and Mohammad Hatta	Topeng Betawi dance, Raja Ampat Islands and Moon orchid	Wage Rudolf Soepratman	Varies	3 letters, 6 numbers	'2016'	19 December 2016	Current	17 August 2022	Imprint 2016–2021, 2024
These images are to scale at 0.7 pixel per millimetre (18 pixel per inch). For table standards, see the banknote specification table.

=== 2022 series ===
Bank Indonesia introduced a new series of banknotes on 18 August 2022. Officially, they were retroactively issued as legal tender on 17 August 2022 to commemorate Indonesia's 77th year of independence. Similar to the 2016 series, the Indonesian dances and national heroes are still featured on the notes, with some notable changes to their colour scheme, security features and sizes.

Rupiah notes '2022' series, Printed by Perum Peruri
Image		Value	Dimensions	Main colour	Description					Date of			Remarks
Obverse	Reverse	Value	Dimensions	Main colour	Obverse	Reverse	Watermark	Signatures	Serial	Note Series	Issue Date	Withdrawal Date	Remarks
		Rp1,000	121 × 65 mm	Yellow, Grey	Tjut Meutia	Tifa dance, Banda Neira, and Cocktown orchid	Tjut Meutia	Perry Warjiyo (Governor) — Sri Mulyani Indrawati (Minister of Finance)	3 letters, 6 numbers	'2022'	17 August 2022	Current	Imprint 2022–2026
		Rp2,000	126 × 65 mm	Grey	Mohammad Husni Thamrin	Piring dance, Sianok Canyon and Magnolia champaca	Mohammad Husni Thamrin	Perry Warjiyo (Governor) — Sri Mulyani Indrawati (Minister of Finance)	3 letters, 6 numbers	'2022'	17 August 2022	Current	Imprint 2022–2026
		Rp5,000	131 × 65 mm	Brown, Orange	Idham Chalid	Gambyong dance, Mount Bromo and Tuberose	Idham Chalid	Perry Warjiyo (Governor) — Sri Mulyani Indrawati (Minister of Finance)	3 letters, 6 numbers	'2022'	17 August 2022	Current	Imprint 2022–2026
		Rp10,000	136 × 65 mm	Purple	Frans Kaisiepo	Pakarena dance, Wakatobi National Park and Magnolia vrieseana	Frans Kaisiepo	Perry Warjiyo (Governor) — Sri Mulyani Indrawati (Minister of Finance)	3 letters, 6 numbers	'2022'	17 August 2022	Current	Imprint 2022–2026
		Rp20,000	141 × 65 mm	Green	G.S.S.J. Ratulangi	Gong dance, Derawan Islands and Coelogyne pandurata	G.S.S.J. Ratulangi	Perry Warjiyo (Governor) — Sri Mulyani Indrawati (Minister of Finance)	3 letters, 6 numbers	'2022'	17 August 2022	Current	Imprint 2022–2026
		Rp50,000	146 × 65 mm	Blue	Djuanda Kartawidjaja	Legong dance, Komodo National Park and Plumeria	Djuanda Kartawidjaja	Perry Warjiyo (Governor) — Sri Mulyani Indrawati (Minister of Finance)	3 letters, 6 numbers	'2022'	17 August 2022	Current	Imprint 2022–2026
		Rp100,000	151 × 65 mm	Red	Sukarno and Mohammad Hatta	Topeng Betawi dance, Raja Ampat Islands and Moon orchid	Sukarno and Mohammad Hatta	Varies (Note: 2022–2026: Perry Warjiyo (Governor) — Sri Mulyani Indrawati (Minister of Finance); 2026: Perry Warjiyo (Governor) — Purbaya Yudhi Sadewa (Minister of Finance))	3 letters, 6 numbers	'2022'	17 August 2022	Current	Imprint 2022–2026
These images are to scale at 0.7 pixel per millimetre (18 pixel per inch). For table standards, see the banknote specification table.

== Commemorative banknotes ==
=== Suharto "25 years of development" commemorative Rp50,000 polymer note (1993) ===
In 1993, a polymer Rp50,000 rupiah note, worth approximately US$24.15 at the time of its release on 22 February (assuming that the exchange rate was Rp2,070 per 1 US dollar at that time period), was issued to celebrate "25 Years of Development" under the New Order; it was the first in Indonesia. It featured a hologram of then-President Suharto and the phrase "Penerbitan Khusus" (Special Issue). Only five million notes are printed and each were packed in a presentation pack explaining the 25-year growth plan since 1969. These notes were priced at Rp100,000 upon release, which was double the face value. The design featured Suharto on the front and Soekarno-Hatta airport on the back, with a plane taking off to symbolise Indonesia's growth. However, it is believed that due to poor sales, some of the polymer notes, minus the folder, were issued as regularly circulating money. A paper version (regular note) of similar design was printed from 1993 through 1998.

Rupiah commemorative polymer notes Suharto '1993', Printed by Note Printing Australia
Image		Value	Dimensions	Main colour	Description					Date of			Remarks
Obverse	Reverse	Value	Dimensions	Main colour	Obverse	Reverse	Watermark	Signatures	Serial	Issue date	Withdrawal date	Replacement	Remarks
		Rp50,000	152 × 76 mm	Blue	Suharto with scenes of economic and social-cultural development of Indonesia, slogan "25 Tahun Indonesia Membangun" (25 years of Indonesia's development)	Garuda Indonesia Boeing 747 aircraft taking off from Soekarno-Hatta International Airport	Suharto hologram, Bank Indonesia watermark	Adrianus Mooy (Governor), Hasudungan Tampubolon (Director)	3 letters, 6 numbers	22 February 1993	21 August 2000	No replacement, last of denomination	Polymer note
These images are to scale at 0.7 pixel per millimetre (18 pixel per inch). For table standards, see the banknote specification table.

=== 75th anniversary of independence Rp75,000 note (2020) ===
On 17 August 2020, Bank Indonesia introduced a second commemorative banknote, valued at Rp75,000 ($5 at the time of its release) to commemorate the 75th anniversary of Indonesia's declaration of independence. With a total of 75 million notes being printed, it was the first commemorative banknote to commemorate Indonesia's independence; before that, it was only issued in coins. They were made available to Indonesian citizens over the age of 17, who could purchase a maximum of one banknote by registering online and collecting it at one of the 45 regional Bank Indonesia branches. Due to the high demand, banknotes were subsequently offered for sale online for prices up to Rp8.8 million, more than 117 times its face value. Following rumors that the notes were only merchandise, and not legal tender, the central bank confirmed they could be used for payment transactions. The design of the note also attracted attention, and Bank Indonesia was obliged to deny that one of the children pictured on the back was wearing a traditional costume from China.

Rupiah commemorative notes 75th Anniversary of Republic of Indonesia '2020'
Image		Value	Dimension	Main colour	Description					Date of		Remarks
Obverse	Reverse	Value	Dimension	Main colour	Obverse	Reverse	Watermark	Signatures	Serial	Note series	issue	Remarks
		Rp75,000	151 x 65 mm	Red and white	Sukarno and Mohammad Hatta with additional picture of flag hoisting ceremony during declaration of independence, a Jakarta MRT 1000 series trainset, Trans-Java Toll Road, and Youtefa Bridge	Children wearing various traditional clothing in Indonesia with picture of Telkom-4 (aka Merah Putih) satellite above Indonesia	Sukarno and Mohammad Hatta	Sri Mulyani Indrawati (Finance Minister), Perry Warjiyo (Governor)	3 letters, 6 numbers	'2020'	17 August 2020	Limited edition
These images are to scale at 0.7 pixel per millimetre (18 pixel per inch). For table standards, see the banknote specification table.

== Anti-counterfeit warnings ==
Until the fall of Suharto, rupiah banknotes featured an anti-counterfeit warning which evolved throughout the years:

- 1945–1947: Barang siapa jang meniru atau memalsu uang kertas negara, atau dengan sengadja mengedarkan, menjimpan ataupun memasukkan ke daerah Republik Indonesia uang kertas tiruan atau palsu, dapat dihukum menurut Kitab Undang² Hukum Pidana pasal 244, 245 dan 249. (Whoever imitates or counterfeits banknotes of the state, or deliberately distributes, stores or imports imitation or counterfeit banknotes to the territory of the Republic of Indonesia, will be punished according to Articles 244, 245 and 249 of the Criminal Code.)
- 1947 (on Dutch-issued banknotes): Di dalam fatsal 244, 245 dan 249 dari Kitab Undang² Hukuman ditetapkan hukuman untuk jang meniru atau memalsukan uang kertas dan untuk jang mengeluarkan dengan sengadja, menjimpan atau memasukkan uang kertas palsu atau jang didjadikan palsu ke Hindia Belanda. (In Articles 244, 245 and 249 of the Criminal Code, penalties are stipulated for those who imitate or falsify banknotes and for those who deliberately issue, store or import counterfeit banknotes or those made to be counterfeit into the Dutch East Indies.)
- 1947–1980: Barangsiapa meniru atau memalsukan uang kertas dan barangsiapa mengeluarkan dengan sengaja atau menyimpan uang kertas tiruan atau uang kertas yang dipalsukan akan dituntut dimuka hakim. (Whoever imitates or falsifies banknotes and whoever issues or keeps imitation or falsified banknotes on purpose will be prosecuted by law.) In the early years of its implementation, this warning was repeated multiple times in microprint, mimicking the technique used on Dutch guilder banknotes.
- 1982–1998: Barangsiapa meniru, memalsukan uang kertas dan/atau dengan sengaja menyimpan serta mengedarkan uang kertas tiruan atau uang kertas palsu diancam dengan hukuman penjara. (Whoever imitates, falsifies banknotes and/or deliberately stores and distributes imitation or counterfeit banknotes will be threatened with imprisonment.)

== Security features ==
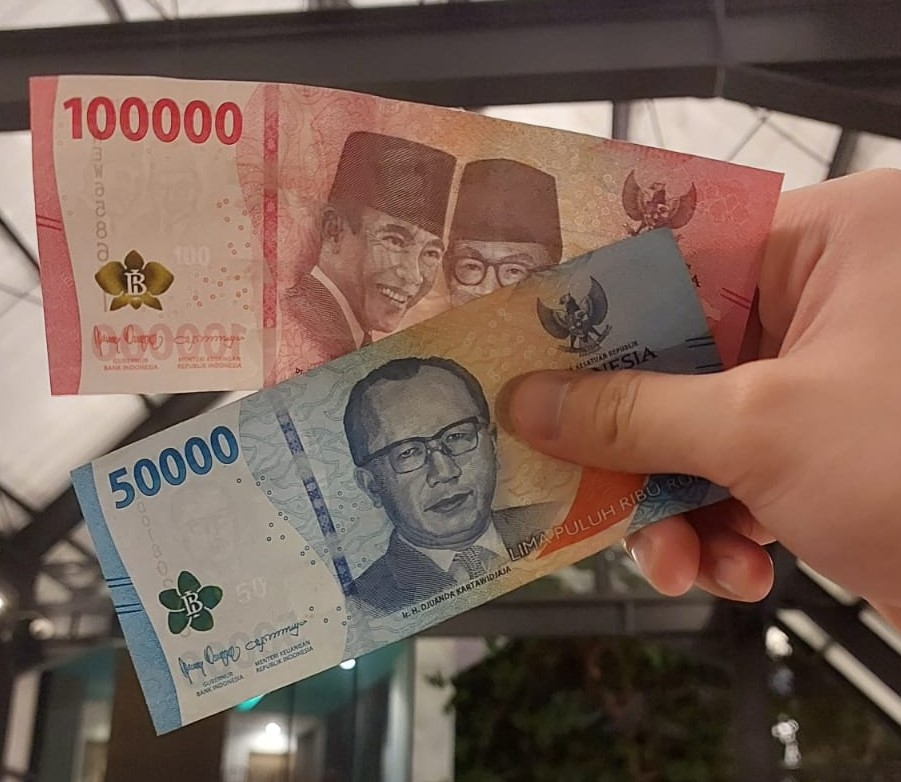
Metallic security thread with the BI logo and the numbers "50" or "100" alternating, optically variable ink, and watermark of the 2022 emission Rp50,000 and Rp100,000 notes. In addition, omron rings are also visible to assist machines in preventing counterfeiting.

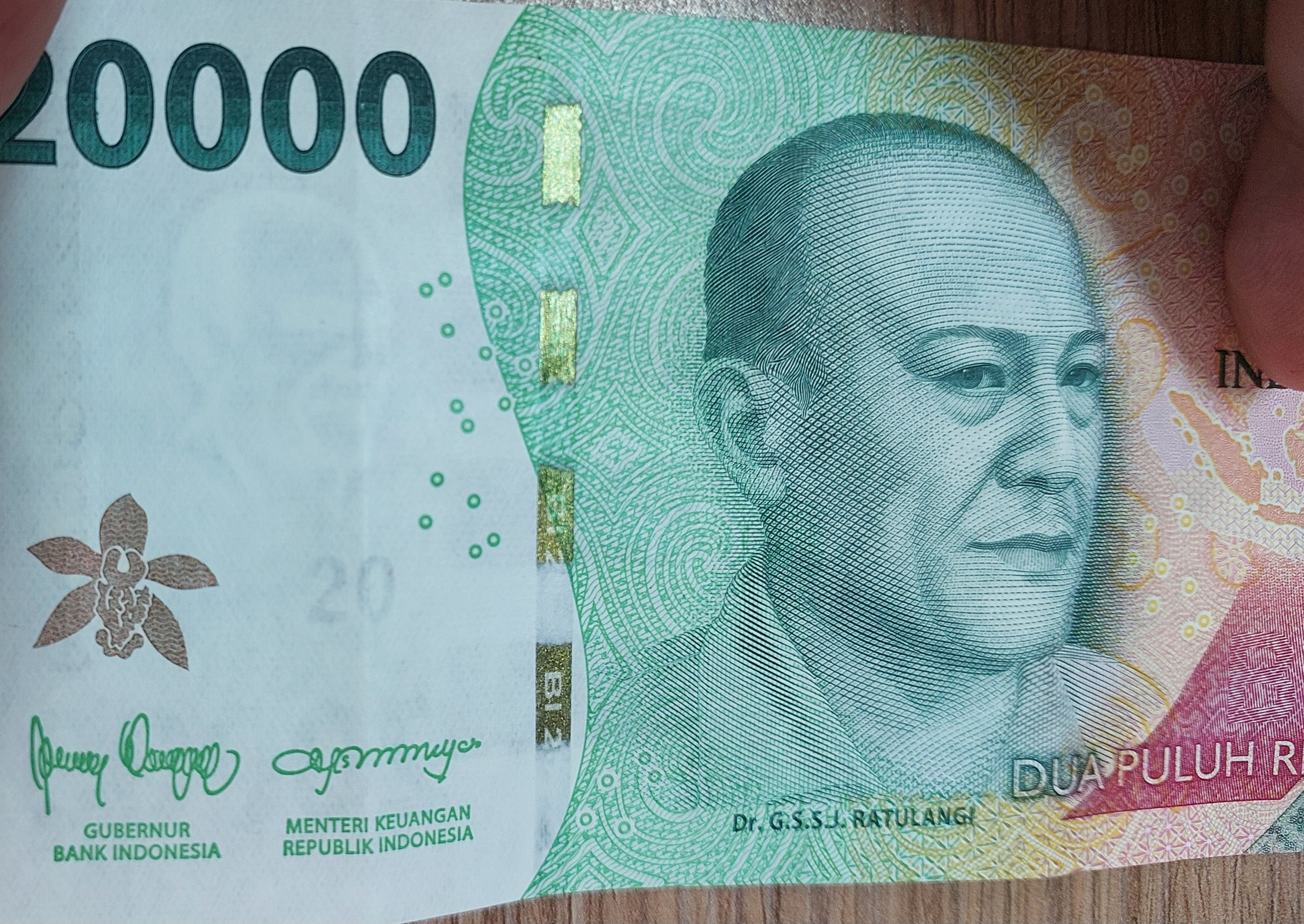
Colour-shifting security thread with the repeating text "BI 20" and image of the Rp20,000 note of the 2022 emission. It is less advanced than the two top denominations due to its lower value of around $1.30 (4 September 2024). The watermark of G.S.S.J Ratulangi's head and the number "20" is also shown. Omron rings are also visible

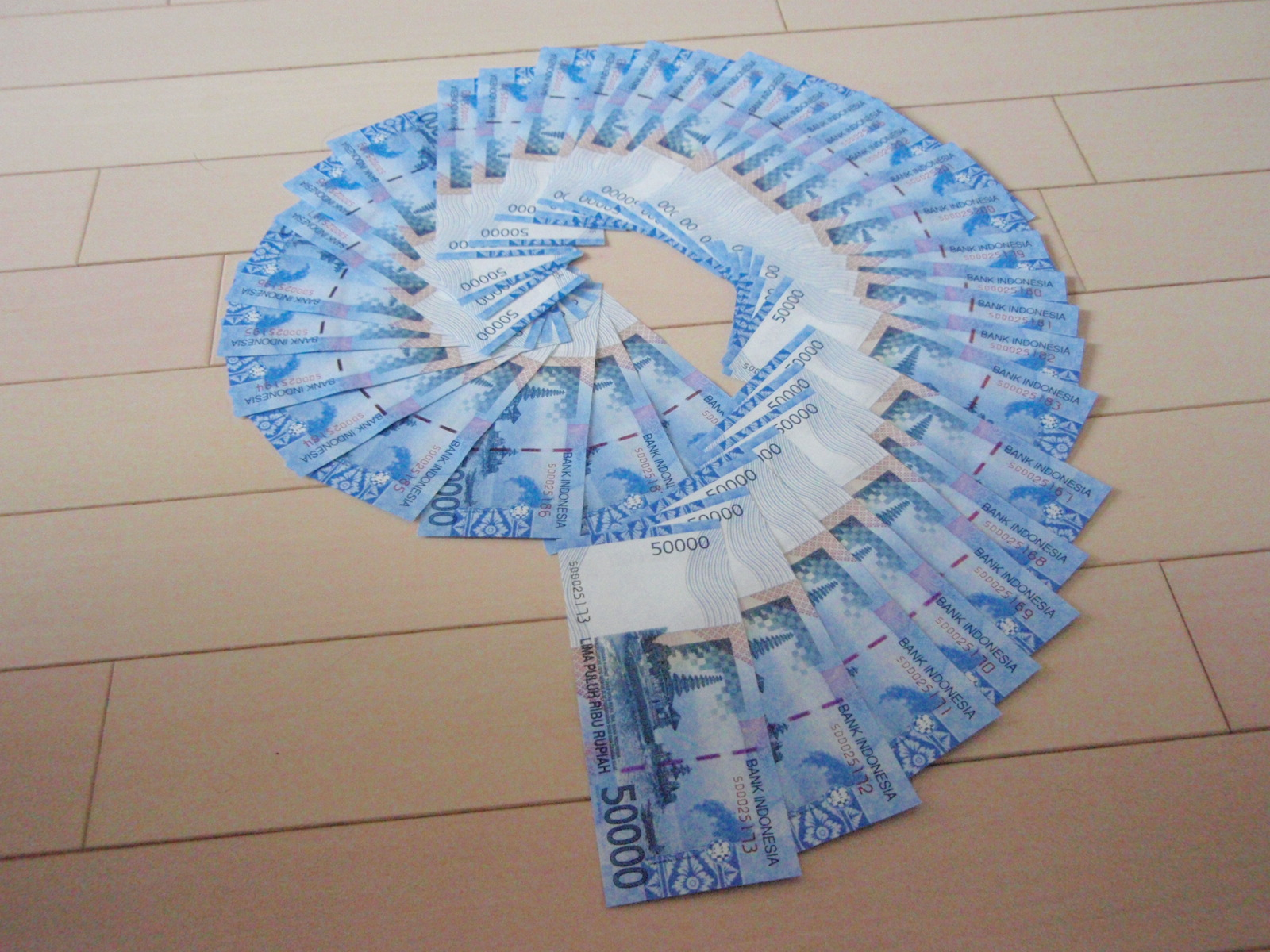
Collection of 2005 emission Rp50,000 notes clearly displaying the security threads.

- The banknotes are made of cotton fibres, because they are more flexible and not easily ripped. However, the actual material used is the abacá fibre, which is naturally plentiful in Indonesia (especially on the Talaud Islands) and is believed to increase the durability of the banknotes. In 2014, Bank Indonesia plan to use these materials, but in 2016 edition, they prefer to print using paper which was also used to print banknotes from previous editions.
- The minimum security features for naked eyes are watermarks, electrotypes and security threads with colour fibres. In addition to this, extra features may be included, such as holograms, Irisafe iridescent stripes, clear windows, metameric windows and gold patches.
  - Watermark and electrotype are made by controlling the gap of density of the fibres which create certain images for the banknotes. This is done to raise the quality of the notes from the aesthetic view.
  - Security threads are put in the middle of the note's materials so horizontal and vertical lines are shown from top to bottom. The threads also can be made with many variations such as the materials, size, colour and design.
- The 2004 and 2005 note series of Rp10,000, Rp20,000, Rp50,000 and Rp100,000 rupiah, which was revised in 2010 and 2011, introduced several new security features: use of EURion constellation rings, rainbow printing designed to change colour when viewed from different angles, and tactile features for blind people and those with visual difficulties to recognise the different denominations stated on the notes.
