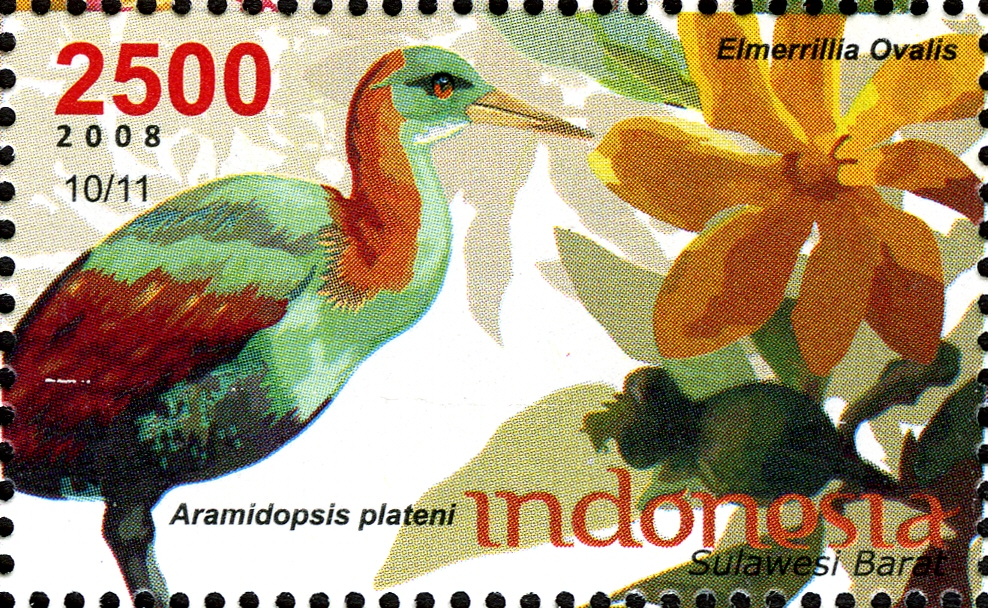
- Magnolia vrieseana with Aramidopsis plateni

Conservation status
- Least Concern (IUCN 3.1)

Scientific classification
- Kingdom: Plantae
- Clade: Embryophytes
- Clade: Tracheophytes
- Clade: Spermatophytes
- Clade: Angiosperms
- Clade: Magnoliids
- Order: Magnoliales
- Family: Magnoliaceae
- Genus: Magnolia
- Subgenus: Magnolia subg. Yulania
- Section: Magnolia sect. Michelia
- Subsection: Magnolia subsect. Elmerrillia
- Species: M. vrieseana

Binomial name
- Magnolia vrieseana (Miq.) Baill. ex Pierre

Synonyms
- Talauma ovalis Miq. Talauma vrieseana Miq. Elmerrillia ovalis (Miq.) Dandy; Elmerrillia vrieseana (Miq.) Dandy

= Magnolia vrieseana =

Species of tree

Magnolia vrieseana is a tree species of the family Magnoliaceae endemic to Indonesia, occurring in Sulawesi and Maluku.

Magnolia vrieseana are large, evergreen trees with spiral leaves and long terminal stipules that leave circular scars when falling off. The flowers are borne on short shoots in leaf axils and have cream or white petals.

The timber of this plant is much sought after in Sulawesi and often used to make carvings by the Toraja people. The species is known as "uru" in the area around Lore Lindu National Park in Central Sulawesi. In Minahasa the Indonesian name is "cempaka hutan kasar" which means "coarse-grained forest-cempaka" and alludes the natural occurrence of the species as opposed to the cultivated cempaka and its coarser-grained wood compared to "cempaka hutan halus" (= "fine-grained forest-cempaka", Magnolia tsiampacca), another other common species with valuable timber in Sulawesi.
