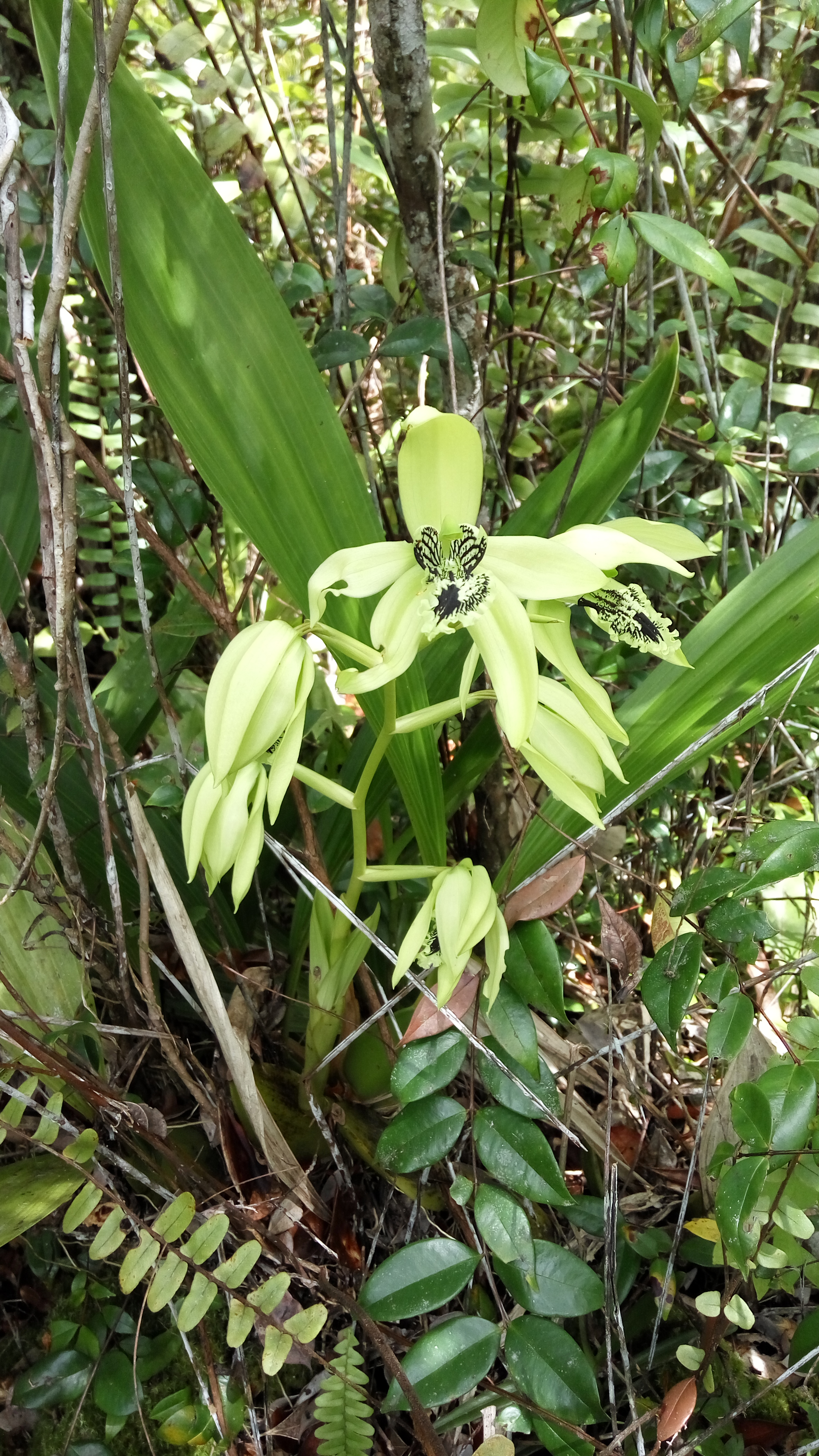
- Flowering C. pandurata photographed in the wild in West Kutai, Indonesia

Conservation status
- CITES Appendix II

Scientific classification
- Kingdom: Plantae
- Clade: Tracheophytes
- Clade: Angiosperms
- Clade: Monocots
- Order: Asparagales
- Family: Orchidaceae
- Subfamily: Epidendroideae
- Tribe: Arethuseae
- Genus: Coelogyne
- Species: C. pandurata

Binomial name
- Coelogyne pandurata Lindl.

Synonyms
- Pleione pandurata (Lindl.) Kuntze; Coelogyne peltastes var. unguiculata J.J.Sm.

= Coelogyne pandurata =

Species of orchid

Coelogyne pandurata is a species of orchid native to Southeast Asia. It was first described by English botanist John Lindley in 1853 based on a specimen collected from Sarawak in 1852 by Hugh Low.

== Distribution and habitat ==
Coelogyne pandurata can be found in Brunei, Indonesia (Sumatra and Kalimantan), Malaysia (Peninsular Malaysia, Sabah, and Sarawak), and possibly the Philippines. It occurs as an epiphyte, lithophyte, or terrestrial plant in lowland and hill forests at elevations of 10–1,000 m (33–3,281 ft).

== Description ==
Coelogyne pandurata arises from a climbing or creeping rhizome, measuring 0.9–1.3 cm (0.35–0.51 in) thick. The pseudobulbs are green and flattened, positioned 4.5–10 cm (1.8–3.9 in) apart on the rhizome. The pseudobulbs are ovate-oblong and measure approximately 6.5–19 cm (2.6–7.5 in) tall by 4–7 cm (1.6–2.8 in) wide and 1.5–3 cm (0.59–1.18 in) thick. The leaves are green and lance-shaped, measuring 15–66 cm (5.9–26.0 in) long and 3.5–10.5 cm (1.4–4.1 in) wide with 5 to 9 main nerves. The inflorescence typically bears of 6 to 15 flowers, though sometimes as few as 3. The scape measures 5.7–21.5 cm (2.2–8.5 in), while the rachis is 15–47 cm (5.9–18.5 in) long. The flowers are primarily light green and borne on 10–52 mm (0.39–2.05 in) long pedicels. The petals are lance-shaped, measuring 33–70 mm (1.3–2.8 in) long and 8–16 mm (0.31–0.63 in) wide with nerves 7 to 11 nerves and a prominent midrib. The median sepal is ovate-lanceolate, measuring 35–75 mm (1.4–3.0 in) long and 7–21 mm (0.28–0.83 in) wide with 11 to 15 nerves. The lateral sepals are ovate-lanceolate and curved, measuring 32–68 mm (1.3–2.7 in) long and 8–18 mm (0.31–0.71 in) wide with 7 to 11 nerves. The labellum is light green with black or brown patches.
