= List of deputy ministers of finance (Indonesia) =

Deputy Minister of Finance

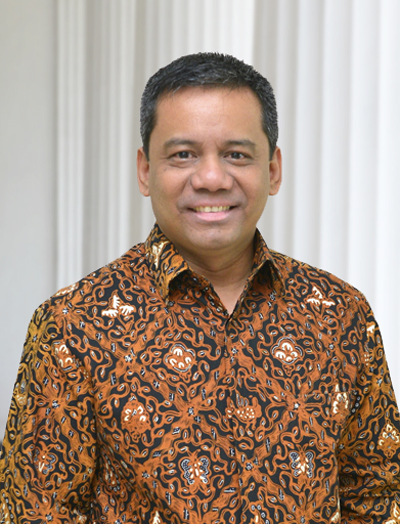
- Incumbent; Suahasil Nazara since 25 October 2019
- Appointer: President of Indonesia
- Inaugural holder: Sjafruddin Prawiranegara
- Formation: 12 March 1946

This article lists persons and politicians who have been appointed as the deputy minister of finance in Indonesia.

No	Photo	Name	Cabinet	Minister	Took office	Left office	Affiliation	R
1		Sjafruddin Prawiranegara	Sjahrir II	Surachman Tjokroadisurjo	12 March 1946	2 October 1946		bernama Menteri Muda Keuangan
2		Lukman Hakim	Sjahrir III	Sjafruddin Prawiranegara	2 October 1946	3 July 1947		bernama Wakil Menteri Keuangan
3		Ong Eng Die	Amir Sjarifuddin I	Alexander Andries Maramis	3 July 1947	11 November 1947		bernama Menteri Muda Keuangan
3		Ong Eng Die	Amir Sjarifuddin II	Alexander Andries Maramis	11 November 1947	29 January 1948		bernama Menteri Muda Keuangan
4		Notohamiprodjo	Working I	Djuanda Kartawidjaja	10 July 1959	18 February 1960		bernama Menteri Muda Keuangan
5		Nasrudin Sumintapura	Development V	J.B. Sumarlin	23 March 1988	11 March 1993		bernama Menteri Muda Keuangan
6		Anny Ratnawati	United Indonesia II	Agus Martowardojo; Muhammad Chatib Basri	20 May 2010	20 October 2014		bernama Wakil Menteri Keuangan
7		Mahendra Siregar	United Indonesia II	Agus Martowardojo; Muhammad Chatib Basri	19 October 2011	3 October 2013		bernama Wakil Menteri Keuangan
8		Bambang Brodjonegoro	United Indonesia II	Muhammad Chatib Basri	3 October 2013	20 October 2014		bernama Wakil Menteri Keuangan
9		Mardiasmo	Working	Bambang Brodjonegoro; Sri Mulyani	27 October 2014	20 October 2019		bernama Wakil Menteri Keuangan
10		Suahasil Nazara	Onward	Sri Mulyani	25 October 2019	Incumbent		
