= QRIS =

Indonesian cashless payment standard

Quick Response Code Indonesia Standard (QRIS)
- Product type: Instant real time inter-bank payment system
- Produced by: Bank Indonesia
- Country: Indonesia
- Introduced: 17 August 2019; 7 years ago
- Website: QRIS on Bank Indonesia website

Quick Response Code Indonesia Standard (abbreviated as QRIS, the abbreviation being a wordplay on keris, a traditional sword; Indonesian: Kode QR Standar Indonesia) is a QR code payment system developed by Bank Indonesia (BI) and the Indonesian Payment System Association (ASPI) aimed to integrate all non-cash payment methods in Indonesia. Launched in 2019, the system enables peer-to-peer (P2P) transactions between banks and person-to-merchant (P2M) payments. All payment service providers (PJP) who uses QR code payments are required to implement QRIS. QRIS can be used by all smartphones with a QR code scanner to transfer funds. QRIS is also available as a near field communication (NFC) based payment under the name QRIS Tap.

By 2024, QRIS transactions in Indonesia have seen a significant surge of 226.54% over the past year, with the number of users reaching 50.50 million and 32.71 million merchants onboarded. The total annual value of QRIS transactions in 2024 is Rp42 trillion (equivalent to $2.57 billion).

== History ==
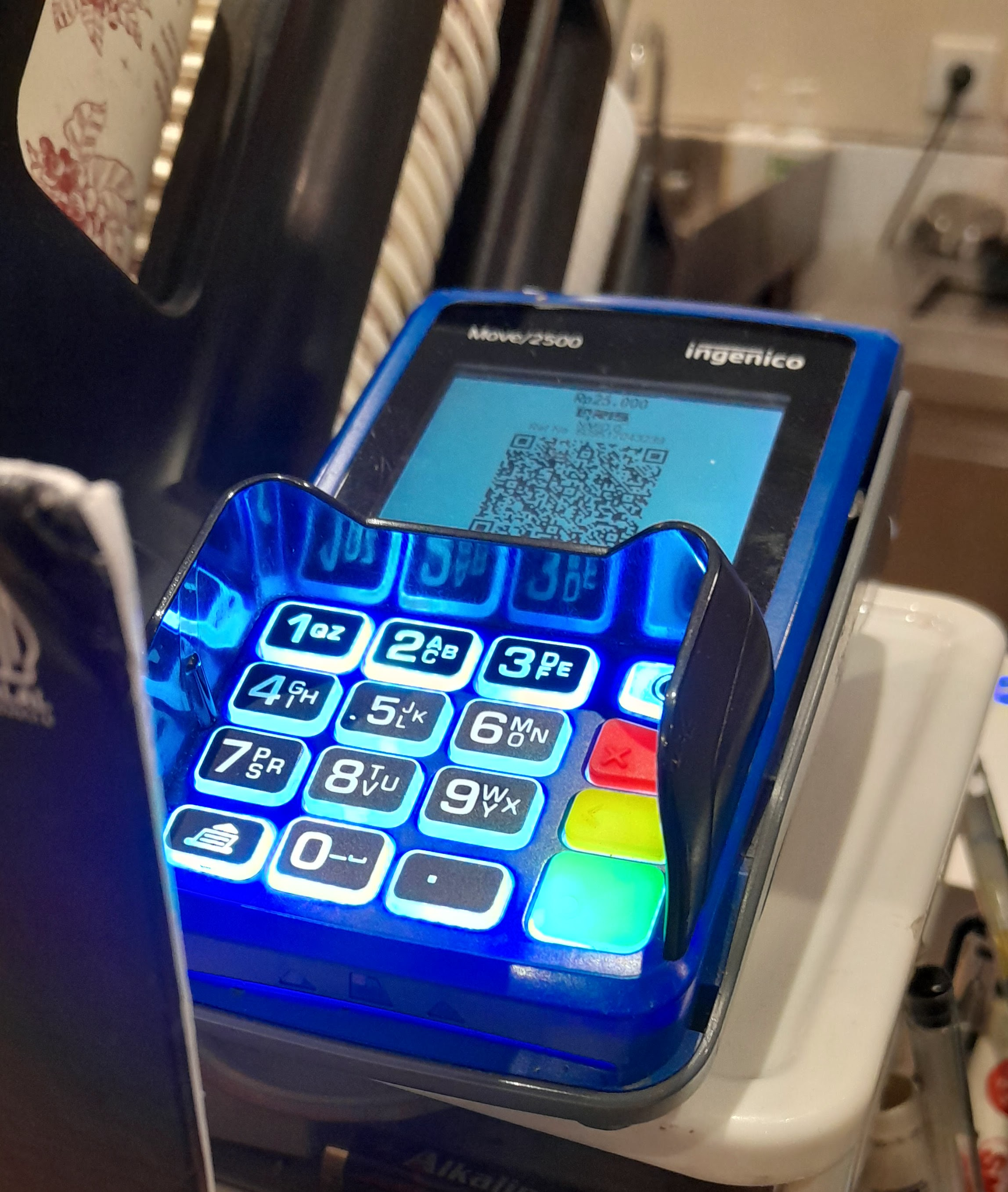
Example of an Ingenico Move/2500 payment terminal showing QRIS QR code for payment

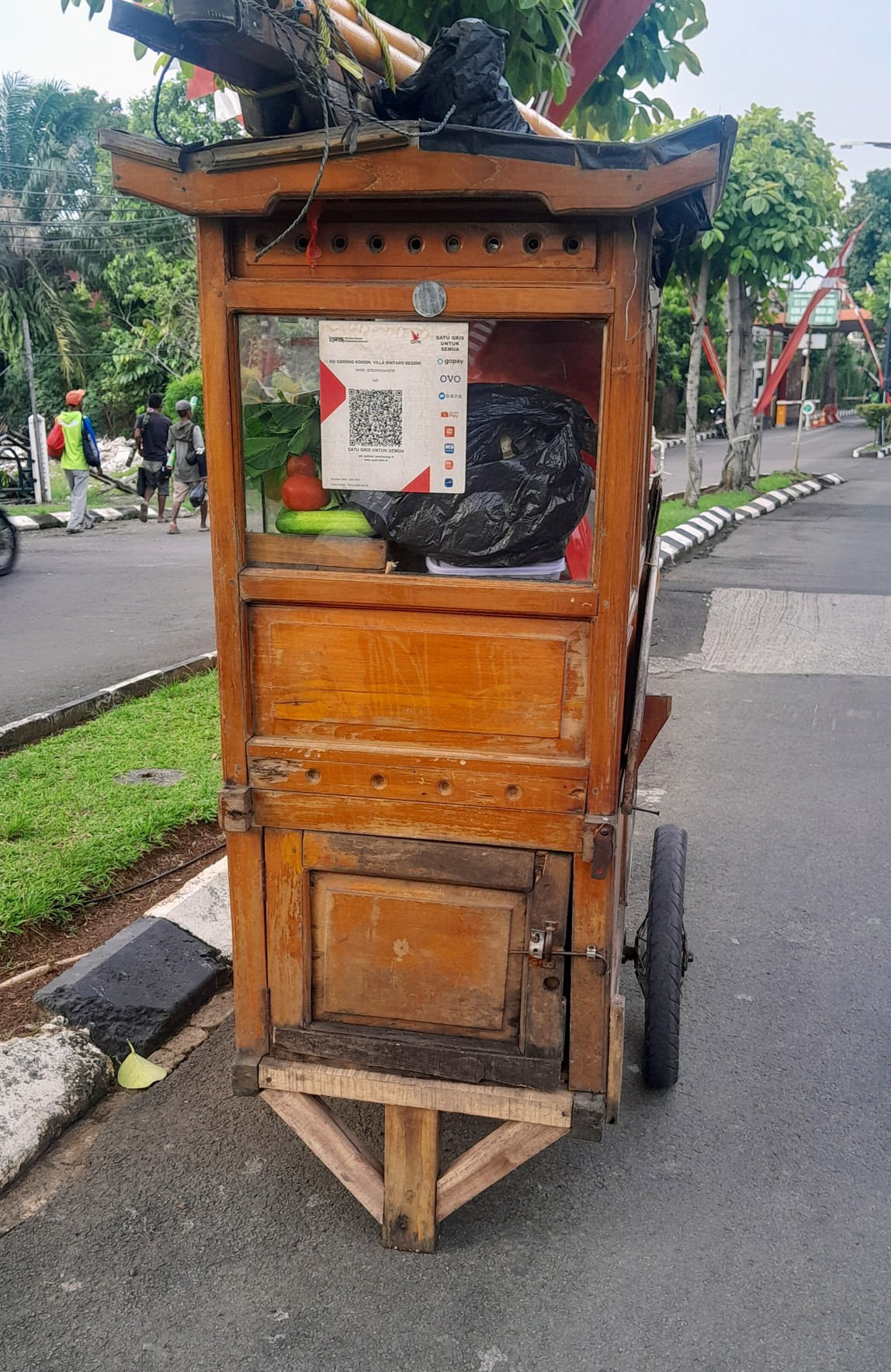
Example of a food cart with QRIS

Before Bank Indonesia implemented the standard, QR codes used by different mobile payment services were exclusive to each service; a QR code issued by one service could not be used by another. On 16 August 2019, following the ratification of Board of Governor Decree No. 21/18/PADG/2019 regarding the Implementation of the Quick Response Code National Standard for Payment Purposes, BI announced the integration of cashless payment methods and services. This standard, named Quick Response Code Indonesia Standard (QRIS), was launched on the 74th anniversary of Indonesia's Independence Day. Payment services were required to implement QRIS by 1 January 2020.

At the start of COVID-19 pandemic in Indonesia, many small and large businesses in Indonesia registered their stores to obtain a QRIS-compliant QR code to accommodate increasing demand for online transactions to reduce the spread of COVID-19 from banknotes and coins. The Secretary of the Indonesian Ministry of Cooperatives and SMEs, Rully Indrawan, stated that by using QRIS, merchants "… could develop their credit profile, which in turn would increase their chance to get funding loans. … Each transaction can also be documented and directly transferred to merchant's bank account, which helps prevent theft and distribution of counterfeit money."

According to Bank Indonesia, by October 2020, QRIS had been implemented by 3.6 million small and micro businesses in Indonesia. QRIS has also been implemented in several tourist attractions and public transport ticketing apps.

By October 2023, the number of QRIS merchants had reached 29.6 million, along with 43.44 million users, with 92% of the merchants being MSMEs.

In March 2025, an NFC-based QRIS payment system, branded as QRIS Tap, was launched by Bank Indonesia. The standard was developed to improve the slow transaction speed of QR code payments. QRIS Tap was initially available to Android phones, with iOS support planned in the future.

== Cross-border linkage ==
Country	QR Payment system	Active since
Thailand	Thai QR Payment (PromptPay)	29 August 2022
Malaysia	DuitNow	8 May 2023
Singapore	SGQR+ (NETS QR)	17 November 2023
Japan	JPQR Global	17 August 2025
South Korea	Seoul Pay Jeju Pay (Tamna Jeon)	1 April 2026
China	Alipay Unionpay	30 April 2026

To support Indonesia's vision of a standardized global trade and retail payment infrastructure, QRIS has established and rapidly expanded its cross-border transactions reach. As of 2 August 2024, users can pay with QRIS or participating apps in Thailand, Singapore, and Malaysia. With QRIS Cross Border, Indonesian tourists abroad can now make transactions simply by scanning QRIS through domestic payment applications from Indonesian banks or digital wallets. There is no need to physically exchange currency or pay international card conversion fees.

QRIS's overseas expansion commenced with a pilot program between Indonesia and Thailand on 17 August 2021, followed by a full rollout on 29 August 2022. A similar path was taken with Malaysia, starting with a pilot on 27 January 2022, and a commercial launch on 8 May 2023. On 17 November 2023, QRIS was integrated with Singapore's SGQR.

By 2 August 2024, MoUs had been signed with South Korea and the United Arab Emirates, with plans to enable QRIS transactions in these countries, as well as Japan and India, in the near future.

On 17 August 2025, coinciding with Indonesia's 80th Independence Day, QRIS was launched in Japan as a cross-border payment method, making Japan the first non-ASEAN country to adopt it. Plans are underway to expand its use in Japan and facilitate transactions for Japanese citizens in Indonesia. This achievement results from collaboration among Bank Indonesia, the Indonesian Payment Systems Association (ASPI), Japan's Ministry of Economy, Trade and Industry (METI), the Payment Japan Association (PJA), and Global Netstars. Concurrently, Bank Indonesia has started QRIS interconnection trials with China in partnership with the People's Bank of China (PBoC).

BI targets the operational launch of QRIS in China by the end of 2025. BI Deputy Governor Filianingsih Hendarta revealed that trials for QRIS interconnection with the PBoC commenced on 17 August 2025. These trials involve ASPI, UnionPay International (UPI), and various payment system service providers. The objective is to facilitate two-way transactions, enabling Indonesians to make transactions in China and vice versa.

During a meeting with Eleventh Commission of the House of Representatives on 22 August 2025, the Governor of Bank Indonesia (BI), Perry Warjiyo, announced that BI is in the process of implementing the QRIS payment system in Saudi Arabia. This initiative aims to simplify transactions for Indonesian Hajj and Umrah pilgrims, allowing them to use QRIS for payments in Saudi Arabia. The implementation is a collaboration between BI and the Saudi Central Bank (SAMA) and is expected to be integrated with the Nusuk card, the official card for pilgrims. The QRIS service is expected to be operational in Saudi Arabia by 2026.

In February 2026, Coordinating Minister for Economic Affairs Airlangga Hartarto announced that QRIS will be available for use in APEC member states, though no specific launch date was given.

== US government response ==
In its 2025 Foreign Trade Barriers report, the Office of the United States Trade Representative claimed that QRIS, along with other monetary policies enacted by Bank Indonesia, were limiting American payment options. According to the report, U.S. companies, including payment providers and banks, expressed concern that during BI's QR code policymaking process, international stakeholders were neither informed about the nature of the potential changes nor given an opportunity to share their views on such a system, including how it might be designed to interact most seamlessly with existing payment systems. Meanwhile, Indonesia aimed to establish digital economic sovereignty by promoting a domestic payment system and safeguarding transaction data. The Government of Indonesia in coordination with Bank Indonesia and Financial Services Authority (OJK) states that QRIS is one of the government's steps to strengthen the national payment ecosystem.

Governor Perry Warjiyo responded to the protest lodged by the United States Trade Representative, stating that QRIS was developed by adopting global standards, adapting those used by Europay, MasterCard, and Visa, while incorporating Indonesian-language settings into the coding. Deputy Governor Destry Damayanti said they are open to integrating QRIS with American payment standards, provided that the United States is willing to do the same. She also stated that Mastercard and Visa still dominate Indonesia's financial services sector.
