= Wibowo =

Wibowo is an Indonesian name. Notable people with the name include:

- Adrian Wibowo (born 2006), Indonesian footballer
- Andre Putra Wibowo (born 1996), Indonesian footballer
- Andy Wibowo (born 1980), Indonesian swimmer
- Arif Wibowo (born 1968), Indonesian politician
- Gusti Irwan Wibowo (1999–2025), Indonesian musician
- Michelle Wibowo (born 1978), British artist
- Nuri Agus Wibowo (born 2001), Indonesian footballer
- Pramono Anung Wibowo (born 1963), Indonesian politician who is the 15th governor of Jakarta
- Pramono Edhie Wibowo (1955–2020), Indonesian military officer
- Pungky Purnomo Wibowo (1968–2021), Indonesian economist
- Santi Wibowo (born 1974), Swiss badminton player
- Sarwo Edhie Wibowo (1925–1989), Indonesian military leader
- Sulistyo Wibowo (born 1969), Indonesian tennis player
- Suryo Agung Wibowo (born 1983), Indonesian sprinter
- Suzanna Wibowo (born 1963), Indonesian tennis player
- Tintus Arianto Wibowo (born 1960), Indonesian tennis player
