= Pungky Purnomo Wibowo =

Indonesian economist and banker (1968–2021)

Head of the Payment System Operation Department
- In office 9 January 2020 – 5 January 2021
- President: Joko Widodo
- Governor: Perry Warjiyo

Personal details
- Born: 13 March 1968 Surabaya, East Java, Indonesia
- Died: 5 January 2021 (aged 52) Jakarta, Indonesia

Pungky Purnomo Wibowo (13 March 1968 – 5 January 2021) was an Indonesian economist and banker who headed the Payment System Operation Department of Bank Indonesia, Indonesia's central bank, from 2020 until 2021. He pushed for the total electronization of the country's toll road payment system and developed Quick Response Code Indonesia Standard (QRIS), a digital-based payment for small and medium-sized enterprises.

== Early life ==
Wibowo was born on 13 March 1968 in Surabaya, the capital of East Java. Wibowo enrolled at the Development Economy Faculty of the Eleventh of March University in 1986, graduating in 1990 with a doctorate degree. He also obtained a management degree from the University of Wollongong in 1998 and a PhD from the University of Birmingham in 2005.

== Career ==
Wibowo began to work at the Bank Indonesia, Indonesia's state bank, in 1993. On 15 January 2018, he was promoted by the Governor of the Bank Indonesia, Agus Martowardoyo, from his previous office as Head of Retail Payment System and Financial Inclusion Development Group to Head of the Department of Electronification and National Payment Gate. Wibowo pushed for the total electronization of the toll road payment system in Indonesia. In an interview with CNBC Indonesia, he said that the department was attempting to place top-up machines in rest areas across the country's toll roads. The electronic payment system was eventually adopted by various public services in Indonesia, such as TransJakarta, Jakarta's bus rapid transit system, and the Indonesian Railways Company, which operates the majority of public railways in Indonesia. He was also involved in the implementation of National Payment Gate (GPN, Gerbang Pembayaran Nasional), a system used to integrate payments using debit cards in merchants. The GPN was fully implemented in June 2018.

On 9 January 2020, Wibowo was transferred to the role of the Head of the Payment System Operation Department, an office he held until his death in 2021. One of the projects that he oversaw during his tenure was the development of the Quick Response Code Indonesia Standard (QRIS), a digital-based payment for small and medium-sized enterprises (SMEs). Wibowo announced that as of 15 January 2020, about 1.7 million SMEs already used QRIS, and aimed for 15 million SMEs – about 5% of SMEs in Indonesia – by the end of 2020. He denied that QRIS was intended to replace banknotes, but would rather reduce the growth in banknote circulation.

On 9 April 2020, the Corruption Eradication Commission summoned Wibowo as a witness in a bribery case related to Pertamina's crude oil trade and factory products.

== Death ==
Wibowo died in Jakarta on 5 January 2021 due to a heart attack. It was announced that he would be buried at San Diego Hills in West Java on 6 January.
