= Second Commission of the House of Representatives of Indonesia =

Indonesian commission within the People's Representative Council

- Komisi II Dewan Perwakilan Rakyat Republik Indonesia
- Coat of arms of the People's Representative Council
- Chairperson: Ahmad Doli Kurnia Tandjung
- Vice Chairperson: Junimart Girsang; Saan Mustopa; Luqman Hakim; Syamsurizal
- Parent organization: People's Representative Council

Second Commission of the House of Representatives in Indonesia, more commonly known as the Second Commission, is one of eleven commissions for the 2019-2024 period, within the People's Representative Council. The commission has the scope of tasks in the fields of domestic administration and regional autonomy; state apparatus and bureaucratic reform, elections, land and agrarian Reform.

== Legal basis ==
1. Law of the Republic of Indonesia Number 17 of 2014 concerning the People's Consultative Assembly, the People's Representative Council, the Regional Representative Council, and the Regional People's Representative Council
2. Law of the Republic of Indonesia Number 42 of 2014 concerning Amendments to Law Number 17 of 2014 concerning the People's Consultative Assembly, People's Representative Council, Regional Representative Council, and Regional People's Representative Council
3. Law of the Republic of Indonesia Number 2 of 2018 concerning the Second Amendment to Law Number 17 of 2014 concerning the People's Consultative Assembly, the People's Representative Council, the Regional Representative Council, and the Regional People's Representative Council
4. Regulation of the House of Representatives of the Republic of Indonesia Number 1 of 2014 concerning Rules of Conduct
5. Regulation of the House of Representatives of the Republic of Indonesia Number 3 of 2015 concerning Amendments to the Regulation of the House of Representatives of the Republic of Indonesia Number 1 of 2014 concerning Orders.

== Scope and duties ==
Like other commissions, the First Commission has duties in the fields of:

1. Domestic Administration and Regional Autonomy;
2. State Apparatus and Bureaucratic Reform;
3. Elections;
4. Land and Agrarian Reform.

== Membership ==
=== Composition ===
==== Leadership ====
Chairman	Vice Chairman	Vice Chairman	Vice Chairman	Vice Chairman
Ahmad Tandjung Golkar	Junimart Girsang PDI-P	Saan Mustopa Nasdem	Luqman Hakim PKB	Syamsurizal PPP
