= Bahrullah Akhbar =

Indonesian public finance scholar and state auditor

Bahrullah Akbar
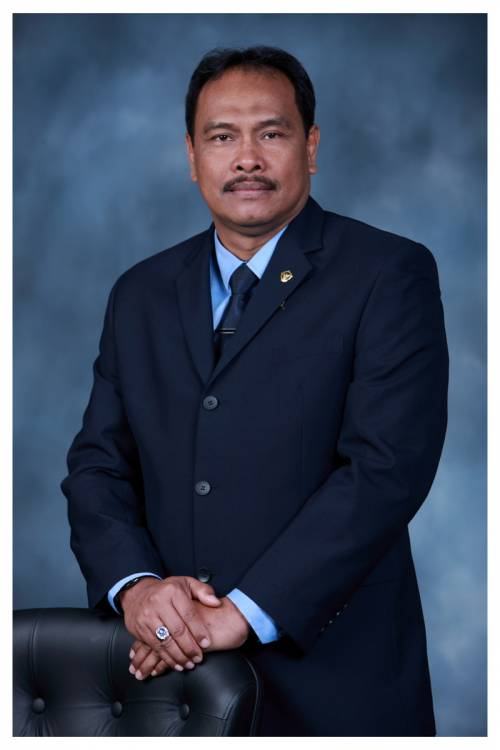

Vice Chairman of the Audit Board of Indonesia
- In office 2017–2019

Personal details
- Born: March 23, 1959 (age 67) Jakarta, Indonesia
- Occupation: Public finance scholar, state auditor

Bahrullah Akbar (born 23 March 1959) is an Indonesian public finance scholar and senior state auditor. He is a professor at the Institute of Home Affairs Governance (Institut Pemerintahan Dalam Negeri, IPDN) and former vice chairman of the Audit Board of Indonesia (Badan Pemeriksa Keuangan, BPK).

Since 2022 he has also served as President Commissioner (Komisaris Utama) of Bank DKI, a regional bank owned by the Jakarta provincial government.

== Early life and education ==
Bahrullah Akbar was born in Jakarta on 23 March 1959.

Official and media profiles describe him as having a background in business, accounting and public-sector management, including postgraduate study overseas and doctoral-level work in government and public finance.

Coverage of his inauguration as professor at IPDN notes his long academic track record and experience in teaching government finance and public administration.

== Academic career ==
Bahrullah Akbar is a professor at IPDN, an Indonesian state institute that prepares civil servants for regional and central government. He was inaugurated as a full professor (guru besar) in government studies at IPDN in 2015, in a ceremony attended by senior government officials. The BPK regional office in West Nusa Tenggara reported the event as highlighting his expertise in public finance oversight and regional development.

As a professor of public finance and government studies, he has delivered public lectures at a number of higher-education institutions. In 2022 he gave a public lecture at the State Islamic Institute (IAIN) Kendari on public-sector governance and accountability, focusing on the role of state financial institutions and regulators in improving regional welfare.

A Google Scholar profile under his name lists works related to regional financial management, government accounting and oversight of public funds.

== Career in the Audit Board ==
Bahrullah Akbar has spent much of his career at the Audit Board of Indonesia (BPK). The BPK foresight portal describes him as a senior board member who has served in several positions, including membership of the board and the post of Vice Chairman.

A 2019 profile in Tempo magazine portrays him as a long-serving BPK member with extensive experience in state-finance audits and close involvement in major financial cases. The article notes that he was elected vice chairman of BPK and highlights his role in promoting performance-based audits and stronger financial accountability.

== Institut Pemeriksa Keuangan Negara (IPKN) ==
In addition to his work in BPK and academia, Bahrullah Akbar has a leading role in the Indonesian State Finance Examiner Institute (Institut Pemeriksa Keuangan Negara, IPKN), a professional organisation for public-sector auditors.

In February 2020 he was appointed Chair of the National Executive Board (Ketua Umum Dewan Pengurus Nasional) of IPKN, following the formal establishment of the organisation by BPK.

Regional media have reported his role in inaugurating IPKN's regional boards, including the North Kalimantan (Kaltara) chapter, as part of efforts to expand professional standards for state finance examiners across Indonesia.

== President Commissioner of Bank DKI ==
In 2022 Bahrullah Akbar was appointed President Commissioner of Bank DKI. The Jakarta Regional Owned Enterprises Development Agency (BP BUMD) confirmed that he had officially taken up the position after approval from the Financial Services Authority (OJK).

Tempo reported the appointment with the headline that a former BPK Vice Chairman had been brought in as President Commissioner of Bank DKI, describing the move as part of efforts to strengthen the bank’s governance. Subsequent institutional communications and greetings from Bank DKI have referred to him in this capacity.

== Public image ==
Media profiles often emphasise Bahrullah Akbar’s background as a Betawi figure and his long experience in both government and academia. A 2017 profile on the Bina Bangun Bangsa website described him as a Betawi-born public finance expert, professor at IPDN and senior member of BPK.

Feature articles published around the Eid al-Fitr holiday have presented him in a more informal setting, discussing Betawi traditions and his family’s celebrations in Jakarta while also highlighting his positions in BPK and IPDN.

== See also ==
- Audit Board of Indonesia
- Public sector accounting
