= Suwartini Wirta =

Indonesian diplomat (born 1964)

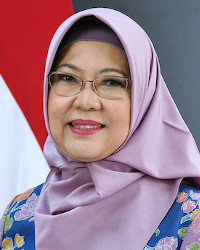

Ambassador of Indonesia to Croatia
- Incumbent
- Assumed office 17 November 2021
- Preceded by: Sjachroedin Zainal Pagaralam

Personal details
- Born: 22 September 1964 (age 61)

Suwartini Sukardi Wirta (born 22 September 1964) is an Indonesian diplomat who has been serving as the ambassador to Croatia since 2021. Previously, she was the deputy chief of mission at the embassy in Ottawa and chief of planning and organization of the foreign ministry.

== Biography ==
Suwartini was born on 22 September 1964. She had been posted to Indonesian representatives abroad, including at the Indonesian consulate general in San Francisco as a vice consul since 26 June 2000. She returned to the foreign ministry and was placed as chief of budgeting control section within the foreign ministry's secretariat general, serving under secretary general Sudjadnan Parnohadiningrat. In a trial held in 2014, Sudjanan was found guilty of misappropriating fatigue money during international seminars and conferences held by the foreign ministry from 2004 to 2005, with Suwartini receiving 165 million rupiahs (about $17,000) from Sudjanan. Suwartini had been investigated as a witness in the case three years earlier.

On 3 September 2010, Suwartini was placed as inspector I within the foreign ministry's inspectorate general, supervising representatives in Central, South, and East Asia, as well as the directorate general of Asia Pacific and Africa, ASEAN Cooperation, and Agency for Policy Assessment and Development. She was then transferred to the secretariat general on 12 April 2012 as the chief of the foreign ministry's financial bureau. Shortly upon assuming office, the ministry received an unqualified opinion from the audit board, and she immediately sent a memo to all foreign ministry units detailing the steps necessary for preparing the next years financial report. She noted that the financial reports had some outstanding issues, such as negative unpaid third-party contributions, and warned that the issue would cause the foreign ministry's financial reports to fall back to a "disclaimer" opinion if it is not fixed.

In 2015, Suwartini became the deputy chief of mission at the embassy in Ottawa. She briefly became the chargé d'affaires ad interim on two occasions: during the ambassador's leave of absence in 2016 and during the transition to the new ambassador in 2018. She left her post in March 2018. By 4 April 2018, Suwartini assumed office as the chief of planning and organization within the foreign ministry's secretariat general.

In June 2021, Suwartini was nominated by President Joko Widodo as ambassador for Croatia . Upon passing an assessment by the House of Representative's first commission in July, she was installed as ambassador on 17 November. She presented his credentials to the President of Croatia Zoran Milanović on 16 February 2022. Early in her term, Suwartini planned to expand cooperation in defense, cybersecurity, and healthcare, and stated Indonesia's interests in using Croatian ports in Rijeka, Zadar, Split, for cargo distribution across Europe. She was also involved in coordinating and facilitating the sister city cooperation proposal between Denpasar and Zadar.
