= Vincentius Sonny Loho =

Indonesian bureaucrat (1957–2023)

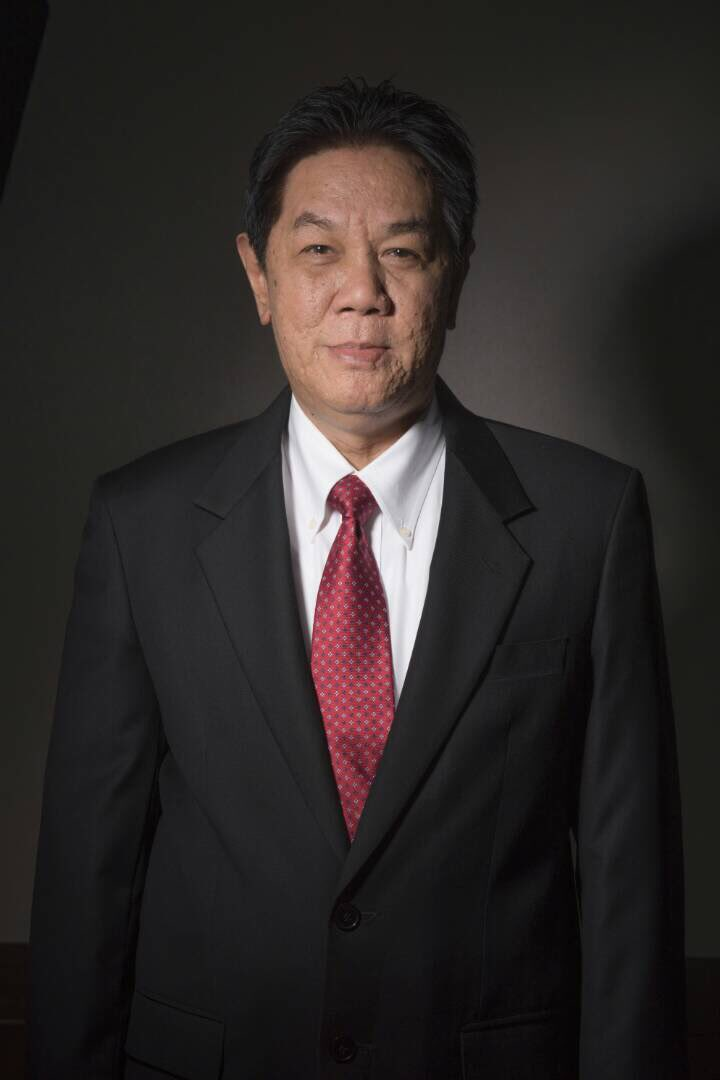
- Official portrait, 2017

Director General of State Assets Management
- In office 1 July 2015 – 3 July 2017
- Minister: Bambang Brodjonegoro; Sri Mulyani
- Preceded by: Hadiyanto
- Succeeded by: Isa Rachmatarwata

Inspector General of the Ministry of Finance
- In office 21 January 2011 – 1 July 2015
- Minister: Agus Martowardojo; Chatib Basri; Bambang Brodjonegoro
- Preceded by: Hekinus Manao
- Succeeded by: Kiagus Ahmad Badaruddin

Personal details
- Born: 1 June 1957 Jakarta, Indonesia
- Died: 14 June 2023 (aged 66) Jakarta, Indonesia
- Education: Indonesian State College of Accountancy; Carnegie Mellon University

Vincentius Sonny Loho (1 June 1957 – 14 June 2023) was an Indonesian accountant and bureaucrat. He was the Inspector General of the Ministry of Finance from 2011 until 2015 and the Director General of State Assets Management from 2015 until 2017.

== Early life and education ==
Loho was born on 1 June 1957 in Jakarta. Upon completing his high school education in 1977, Loho attended the Indonesian State College of Accountancy. He graduated from the college with a diploma in 1980. He later obtained a full bachelor's degree in accounting from the college in 1987. He completed his postgraduate studies in public management at the Carnegie Mellon University in 1999.

== Career ==
Loho began working as an employee in the finance ministry's Directorate of State Treasury Management since 1979. After working as a regular employee for over a decade, he was eventually appointed the head of the verification subsection in the State Financial Accounting Agency in 1993. He was then promoted to head of the accounting assistance section in 1999, head of the consolidation and financial reporting sub-directorate in 2004, and the director of financial management assistance for general service bodies on 9 November 2006. About two years later, on 17 October 2008 Loho was transferred to the post of Director of Accounting and Financial Reporting.

On 21 January 2011, Loho was installed as the Inspector General of the Ministry of Finance, replacing Hekinus Manao who was appointed by the World Bank as one of its executive directors. Loho had previously replaced Manao as Director of Accounting and Financial Reporting. Due to this, Loho was described as Manao's "cadre" for succeeding him in different offices.

During his tenure as inspector general, Loho conducted investigations on various bodies in the finance ministry, such as tax mafias in the Directorate General of Taxation and on a suspicious bank account owned by a high-ranking tax official. Loho also established cooperation with various ministries to supervise education funds. He was nominated by the Ministry of Finance for the position of the Head of the Development and Finance Supervision Board, but failed to pass the selection process.

After serving as inspector general for four years, Loho was appointed the Director General of State Assets Management. He replaced Hadiyanto, who had held the post for nine years. At his inauguration, finance Minister Bambang Brodjonegoro requested Loho to oversee and accelerate the merger between two state-owned enterprises. Under his leadership, the directorate general began inventorying Indonesia's natural resources. Loho was replaced in his position on 3 July 2017 and retired from the finance ministry.

== Later life and death ==
After retiring, Loho continued to become commissioner in different companies. He continued to become commissioner in the Bank Rakyat Indonesia until 2018. He also became a commissioner in the Indonesian Infrastructure Finance, Danareksa State Enterprise, and the Jasa Marga Company.

Loho died in Jakarta on 14 June 2023, at the age of 66. He was interred two days later at the Giri Tama Cemetery in Bogor. Incumbent finance minister Sri Mulyani delivered her condolences.
