= Loho =

Loho may refer to:

- Luohe, spelled as Loho in Chinese Postal Map Romanization, city in Henan, China
- Lower East Side, in New York City
- Loho Studios, a New York recording studio
- Vincentius Sonny Loho (1957–2023), Indonesian accountant and bureaucrat
