= Luqman Hakim =

Luqman Hakim (also Lukman, Loekman or Loqman, Arabic: لقمان الحكيم), meaning Luqman (namesake of the 31st sūrah) the Wise, is a given name of Arabic origin used primarily by Malaysian and Indonesian Muslims. Notable people with this name include:

- Lukman Hakim (1914–1966), Indonesian economist and diplomat, Minister of Finance (1948–1950), Governor of Bank Indonesia (1958–1959) and Ambassador to West Germany (1961–1966)
- Lukman Hakim Saifuddin (born 1962), Indonesian Islamic scholar and Minister of Religious Affairs (2014–2019)
- Loekman Hakim (born 1975), Indonesian rock musician, guitarist of Noah
- Lukman Hakim (born 1980), incumbent Regent of Bangkalan, East Java, Indonesia
- Luqman Hakim (born 1975), member of the Indonesian House of Representatives (2019–2024)
- Loqman Hakim Marzuki (born 1998), Malaysian footballer
- Luqman Hakim Shamsudin (born 2002), Malaysian footballer
