= Arifin Siregar =

Indonesian politician (1934–2019)

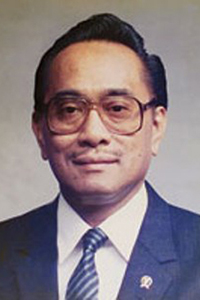
- Siregar as Governor of Bank Indonesia

13th Ambassador of Indonesia to the United States
- In office 1 October 1993 – 21 November 1997
- President: Suharto
- Preceded by: Abdul Rahman Ramly
- Succeeded by: Dorodjatun Kuntjoro-Jakti

22nd Minister of Trade
- In office 21 March 1988 – 17 March 1993
- President: Suharto
- Preceded by: Rachmat Saleh
- Succeeded by: Satrio Budihardjo Joedono

8th Governor of Bank Indonesia
- In office 1983–1988
- President: Suharto
- Preceded by: Rachmat Saleh
- Succeeded by: Adrianus Mooy

Personal details
- Born: Arifin Mohamed Siregar; 11 February 1934 Medan, Sumatra Utara, Dutch East Indies
- Died: 23 September 2019 (aged 85) Jakarta, Indonesia
- Party: Independent
- Spouse: Adiati
- Children: 3
- Education: Nederlandsche Economische Hogeschool; University of Münster
- Profession: Economist; Politician; Diplomat

Arifin Mohamed Siregar (11 February 1934 – 23 September 2019) was an Indonesian banker and politician who served as Minister of Trade from 1988 to 1993, having previously been the Governor of Bank Indonesia from 1983 to 1988. He was born in Medan, and died, aged 85, in Jakarta.

== Education ==
- Nederlandsche Economische Hogeschool, Rotterdam, Netherlands (1953–1956)
- Westfälische Wilhelms-Universität Münster, West Germany (1958)
- Westfälische Wilhelms-Universität Münster, West Germany (doctor, 1960)

== Honors ==
=== Domestic honors ===
- Indonesia:
  - Star of Mahaputera Adipradana (1987)

=== Foreign honors ===
- Germany:
  - Grand Cross of the Order of Merit of the Federal Republic of Germany (1988)
- Netherlands :
  - Knight Grand Cross of the Order of Orange-Nassau

Diplomatic posts
Preceded by Abdul Rahman Ramly	Ambassador of Indonesia to the United States; 1993–1997	Succeeded by Dorodjatun Kuntjoro-Jakti
Political offices
Preceded by Rachmat Saleh	Minister of Trade; 1988–1993	Succeeded by Satrio Budihardjo Joedono
Government offices
Preceded by Rachmat Saleh	Governor of Bank Indonesia; 1983–1988	Succeeded by Adrianus Mooy
