= Satrio Budihardjo Joedono =

Indonesian economist and politician

Satrio "Billy" Joedono
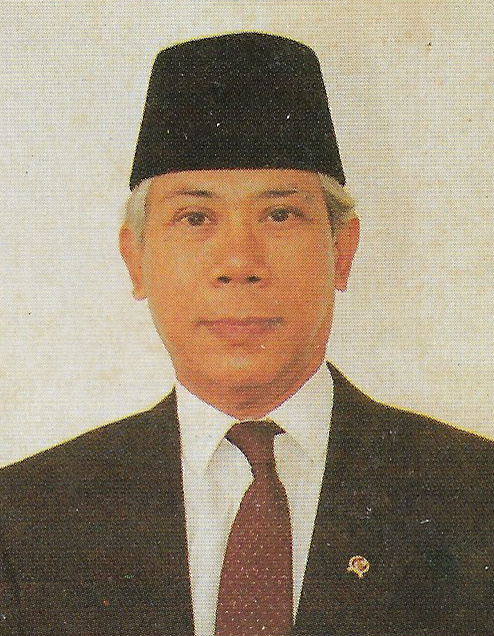
- Official portrait, 1993

11th Chair of the Audit Board of Indonesia
- In office 1998–2004
- President: Suharto; B. J. Habibie; Abdurrahman Wahid; Megawati Sukarnoputri
- Preceded by: J. B. Sumarlin
- Succeeded by: Anwar Nasution

13th Ambassador of Indonesia to France
- In office 1996–1998
- President: Suharto
- Preceded by: Wiryono Sastrohandoyo
- Succeeded by: Dadang Sukandar

23rd Minister of Trade
- In office 17 March 1993 – 6 December 1995
- President: Suharto
- Preceded by: Arifin Siregar
- Succeeded by: Tungki Ariwibowo

Personal details
- Born: Satrio Budihardjo Joedono; 1 December 1932 Pangkalpinang, Bangka; Dutch East Indies
- Died: 16 April 2017 (aged 84) Jakarta, Indonesia
- Education: Canisius College
- Profession: Economist; Politician; Diplomat

Satrio "Billy" Budihardjo Joedono (1 December 1932 – 16 April 2017) was an Indonesian economist who served as Minister of Trade from 1993 to 1995. He graduated at the top level from Canisius College.

== Career ==
Joedono served as the Minister of Trade of Indonesia from 1993 to 1995. In November 1995 the Department of Trade was merged with the Ministry of Industry and a Ministry of Industry and Trade (Depperindag) was established. Later, Joedono was appointed to the key position of Chair of the Audit Board of Indonesia, holding this position from 1998 to 2004.

Government offices
Preceded by J. B. Sumarlin	Chair of the Audit Board of Indonesia; 1998–2004	Succeeded by Anwar Nasution
Diplomatic posts
Preceded by Wiryono Sastrohandoyo	Ambassador of Indonesia to France; 1996–1998	Succeeded by Dadang Sukandar
Political offices
Preceded by Arifin Siregar	Minister of Trade; 1993–1995	Succeeded by Arifin Siregar
