= Lukman Hakim (economist) =

Indonesian economist and diplomat

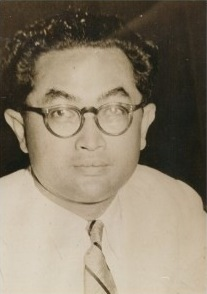
- Hakim in 1948

4th Ambassador of Indonesia to West Germany
- In office 1961 – 20 August 1966
- President: Sukarno
- Preceded by: Zairin Zain
- Succeeded by: Alfian Yusuf Helmi

2nd Governor of Bank Indonesia
- In office 9 April 1958 – 31 August 1959
- President: Sukarno
- Preceded by: Sjafruddin Prawiranegara
- Succeeded by: Sutikno Slamet

6th Minister of Finance
- In office 20 December 1949 – 6 September 1950 (Note: Between 20 December 1949 and 6 September 1950, Hakim served as Minister of Finance in the Susanto and Halim cabinets under the State of Republic of Indonesia and not as Minister of Finance of the United States of Indonesia, which was held by Sjafruddin Prawiranegara.)
- President: Assaat
- Prime Minister: Susanto Tirtoprodjo; Abdul Halim
- Preceded by: Sjafruddin Prawiranegara
- Succeeded by: Sjafruddin Prawiranegara
- In office 4 August 1949 – 20 December 1949
- President: Sukarno
- Prime Minister: Mohammad Hatta
- Preceded by: Himself
- Succeeded by: Sjafruddin Prawiranegara
- In office 19 December 1948 – 13 July 1949
- PDRI Chairman: Sjafruddin Prawiranegara
- Preceded by: Alexander Andries Maramis
- Succeeded by: Himself

Minister of Justice
- In office 19 December 1948 – 31 March 1949
- PDRI Chairman: Sjafruddin Prawiranegara
- Preceded by: Susanto Tirtoprodjo
- Succeeded by: Susanto Tirtoprodjo

Vice Minister of Finance
- In office 2 October 1946 – 3 July 1947
- President: Sukarno
- Prime Minister: Sutan Sjahrir
- Preceded by: Sjafruddin Prawiranegara
- Succeeded by: Ong Eng Die

Personal details
- Born: 6 June 1914 Tuban, Dutch East Indies
- Died: 20 August 1966 (aged 52) Bonn, West Germany
- Party: Indonesian National Party
- Occupation: Economist; diplomat

Lukman Hakim (6 June 1914 – 20 August 1966) was an Indonesian economist and diplomat who served as Minister of Finance between 1948 and 1950, serving under both the Emergency Government of the Republic of Indonesia and the Republic of Indonesia during the United States of Indonesia period. He was also the Governor of Bank Indonesia between 1958–1959, and the Ambassador to West Germany between 1961 and his death in 1966.

== Early life and education ==
Lukman Hakim was born in Tuban, East Java on 14 October 1914. His father, Abdoellah Koestoer, originated from Surakarta while his mother was from Tuban. Hakim received his early education in Tuban, Surakarta, and then Yogyakarta, before moving to Batavia. He obtained a law degree there by 1941. During his studies, he joined nationalist youth organizations such as Indonesia Muda, for which he chaired the Jakarta branch, and later the Indonesian Students' Association.

== Career ==
During the Japanese occupation of the Dutch East Indies, Hakim worked at the occupation government's tax office. He initially worked in the Semarang tax office before being reassigned to Jakarta. During this period he was not politically active. After the proclamation of Indonesian independence, Hakim joined the Indonesian National Party, and within the organizational structure, he assisted Soemanang Soerjowinoto who headed the party's economic department. He was then appointed Junior Minister for Finance in the Third Sjahrir Cabinet.

In July 1947, Hakim was appointed as State Commissioner for Finances in Sumatra and moved there. After Operation Kraai, he became Minister of Finance within Sjafruddin Prawiranegara's Emergency Government (PDRI). The Prawiranegara government encountered difficulties with a shortage of Republican currency in Sumatra's interior, and Hakim sent instructions to the Republican local government in Jambi to issue the currency. In January 1949, Hakim himself led a group in Jambi to physically print Republican money in the town of Muara Bungo, his group carrying cliches of the currency and using converted conventional printing equipment there to print the money. He continued to serve as finance minister for some time after the return of the Indonesian government to Yogyakarta (the Second Hatta Cabinet), and served under the Susanto Cabinet and Halim Cabinet.

By mid-1956, Hakim was deputy governor of Bank Indonesia, with Sjafruddin Prawiranegara serving as governor. With Prawiranegara (a Masyumi member) near the end of his term of office, the Indonesian National Party wanted to replace him with Hakim. Although Hakim and Prawiranegara were both close due to their time at PDRI, Hakim accepted the political nomination. Since the Nahdlatul Ulama backed Masyumi, however, Prawiranegara remained in his office. Hakim later replaced Prawiranegara to serve as BI governor between 1958 and 1959.

On 2 April 1961, Hakim was appointed as Indonesia's Ambassador to West Germany. In 1961-1962, the Netherlands pressured the West German government to cease development aid to Indonesia due to the West New Guinea dispute. Following Hakim's lobbying, the West German government indicated its neutrality in the dispute, hence preserving the aid. Hakim continued lobbying the West German government during the Indonesia–Malaysia Confrontation period. He died on 20 August 1966 while still serving as ambassador in Bonn.

== Notes ==
Government offices
Preceded by Sjafruddin Prawiranegara	Governor of Bank Indonesia; 1958–1959	Succeeded by Sutikno Slamet
Political offices
Preceded by Alexander Andries Maramis	Minister of Finance; 1948–1950	Succeeded by Sjafruddin Prawiranegara
Preceded by Sjafruddin Prawiranegara	Vice Minister of Finance; 1946–1947	Succeeded by Ong Eng Die
Diplomatic posts
Preceded by Zairin Zain	Ambassador of Indonesia to West Germany; 1961–1966	Succeeded by Alfian Yusuf Helmi
