= Perry Warjiyo =

Indonesian economist (born 1959)

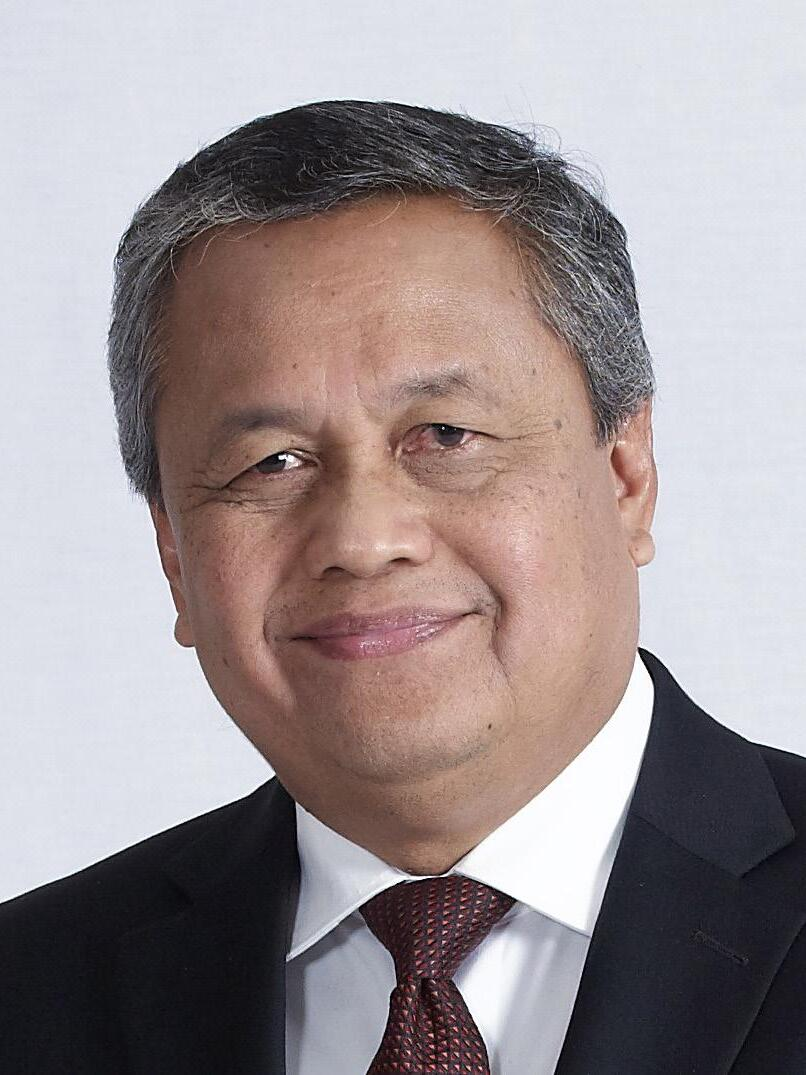
- Official portrait, 2018

16th Governor of Bank Indonesia
- In office 24 May 2018 – 27 July 2026
- President: Joko Widodo; Prabowo Subianto
- Preceded by: Agus Martowardojo
- Succeeded by: Destry Damayanti

Deputy Governor of Bank Indonesia
- In office 15 April 2013 – 24 May 2018
- President: Susilo Bambang Yudhoyono; Joko Widodo
- Governor: Darmin Nasution; Agus Martowardojo

Personal details
- Born: 25 February 1959 (age 67) Sukoharjo, Central Java, Indonesia
- Education: Gadjah Mada University (BA); Iowa State University (MA, PhD)

Perry Warjiyo (born 25 February 1959) is an Indonesian economist who served as the Governor of Bank Indonesia from 2018 to 2026.

Perry has over 30 years of experience working on central bank policy issues in Indonesia. He has been described as a central banker who is “as battle-tested as monetary policymakers get”. His appointment reflects the practice in Indonesia of frequently appointing professionals with strong economic and policymaking experience (often referred to as “technocrats”) to senior economic posts in government.

== Background ==
Perry Warjiyo was born in Sukoharjo, a town in Central Java south of the larger city of Surakarta. He attended primary and secondary school in Sukoharjo before studying at Gadjah Mada University (UGM) in Yogyakarta. He graduated from Faculty of Economics in 1982 and later undertook studies at Iowa State University in the United States. He graduated in economics at Iowa State University, specialising in monetary policies and international finance, with a master's degree in 1989 and a PhD in 1991.

== Work with government ==
A brief summary of Perry Warjiyo's work with government is as follows:

- 1984: Joined Bank Indonesia as a junior staff member in January.
- 1992: Officer, Staff of the Governor (served as staff to Governors Adrianus Mooy and Soedradjad Djiwandono)
- 1995: Head, Balance of Payments Section
- 1997: Head, Monetary Policy and Analysis Section
- 1998: Head, Bureau of the Governor
- 2000: Deputy Director for Economic Research and Monetary Policy
- 2003: Director, Centre for Education and Study of Central Bank Issues
- 2005: Director for Economic Research and Monetary Policy
- 2007: Executive Director, International Monetary Fund (IMF), Washington, representing the South East Asian Voting Group (a constituency including 13 countries in South East Asia)
- 2013: Deputy Governor, Bank Indonesia

During his career in government, Perry Warjiyo has acted as an adviser to Indonesian delegations to numerous international meetings including with the International Monetary Fund and World Bank, Asian Development Bank, G20, EMEAP, Bank for International Settlements, and the Consultative Group on Indonesia.

In October 2019, Global Markets on-line newspaper recognised Perry Warjiyo as Governor of the Year 2019 for the Asia-Pacific region. The award was presented to Perry "for his achievements in terms of maintaining economic stability in Indonesia despite economic and political shocks and throughout the digital transformation undertaken by Bank Indonesia."

== Policies as Governor ==
=== 2018 ===
Shortly after Perry become Governor in mid-2018, international economic conditions led to pressure on the Indonesian exchange rate and the rupiah depreciated noticeably. In response, several increases in the domestic interest rate were announced and Perry indicated that Bank Indonesia planned to pursue policies to promote domestic economic growth and maintain stability. He said that he believed that there were "three keys to a country's resilience in the face of external pressures." These were, "First, the conviction that our economy is healthy. Second, it's the courage to adopt the policies that are required, which are sound and preemptive. If you live under uncertainty, don't linger over it. ... Third, there should be clear and intensive communication." In mid-August 2018 when there appeared to be market pressures encouraging a depreciation of the rupiah, Perry announced a further increase in domestic interest rates.

Later in 2018, as the US Fed tightened monetary policy in America, Bank Indonesia indicated that interest rates in Indonesia would be increased further if necessary. In late September, the official rate in Indonesia was lifted to 5.25%. The rate was increased again in several moves to 6% by mid-November. This increase was the sixth rise in interest rates since Perry had been appointed Governor.

=== 2019 ===
Discussing the stance of monetary policy in early 2019, Perry suggested that he regarded monetary policy as quite tight. He said Bank Indonesia's interest policy rate would be set to anticipate external factors, especially to stabilize the exchange rate and to limit the current account deficit to 2.5% of GDP. Later, in May, when the rupiah began to weaken as a result of trends in international financial markets, Bank Indonesia indicated that monetary policy would remain firm. This approach was in contrast to decisions announced at the time in both Malaysia and the Philippines to relax monetary policy somewhat and to lower interest rates. However, beginning in July, a series of measures were taken to ease monetary policy in Indonesia:

- In July 2019, Bank Indonesia announced a reduction in the interest rate (reverse repo rate) from 6.0% to 5.75%. Perry suggested that there may be room for further easing in months ahead saying, "Bank Indonesia thinks there is still room for accommodative policies, in line with a low inflation projection and to push for further economic growth".
- The following month, in August, Bank Indonesia announced a second cut in the interest rate from 5.75% to 5.5%. The move was interpreted by commentators as reflecting an indication that monetary authorities were inclined to ensure that monetary policy supported the Indonesian Government's broad pro-growth approach. Recent national income figures had suggested that growth was turning out to be somewhat lower than expected. Some commentators predicted that there would be more rate cuts before the end of 2019.
- In September, Bank Indonesia announced the third interest rate cut in three months, reducing the seven-day repo rate to 5.25%. Perry said, "This is a preemptive measure to push for economic growth momentum that has been slowing."
- In October, the seven-day repo rate was reduced once again to 5.0%. The Bank Indonesia statement said that the decision was " ... consistent with controlled inflation ... and as a pre-emptive measure to stimulate domestic economic growth momentum against a backdrop of global economic moderation."

=== 2020 ===
During 2020, in response to the COVID-19 crisis, monetary policy was further eased.

- On 20 February, the benchmark interest rate (7 day reverse repo rate) was reduced from 5% to 4.75%. The move was seen, partly, as a response to uncertainties resulting from the COVID-19 pandemic and, indeed, the Bank Indonesia statement announcing the interest rate cut made reference to the virus outbreak.
- In March, the benchmark interest rate was eased from 4.75% to 4.5%
- In June, the rate was again reduced to 4.25%
- In July, the rate was reduced to 4.0%.
- In November, the rate was reduced to 3.75%

=== 2021 ===
Monetary policy easing continued in the early part of 2021. In mid-February, the benchmark interest rate (7-day reverse repo rate) was lowered to 3.5%.

=== 2026 ===
On 27 July 2026, Indonesian Minister of State Secretariat Prasetyo Hadi announced that President Prabowo Subianto had accepted Perry's resignation, which he had submitted in a letter citing personal reasons. The resignation abruptly ended Perry's seven-year tenure as Governor of Bank Indonesia, roughly two years before his second term was due to expire in 2028.

== Other activities ==
Perry Warjiyo has an extensive publication record of articles covering a wide range of monetary policy issues in both English and the Bahasa Indonesia language. He has also maintained links with universities across Indonesia. He has provided numerous guest lectures about monetary policy in Indonesian universities and has acted as a supervisor and examiner in post-graduate studies in the Faculty of Economics and Business in the University of Indonesia in Jakarta. More recently, in 2019 his book on Central Bank Policy: Theory and Practice, co-authored with Solikin M. Juhro, was published. The book provides a survey of central bank policies in emerging market economies.

Government offices
Preceded by Agus Martowardojo	Governor of Bank Indonesia; 2018–present	Incumbent
