= Harry Azhar Azis =

Indonesian politician (1956–2021)

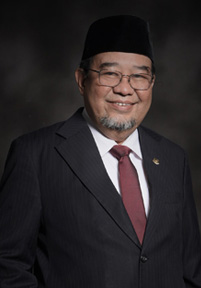
- Professor Harry Azhar Azis in 2019

Chairman of the Audit Board of Indonesia
- In office 21 October 2014 – 21 April 2017
- President: Joko Widodo
- Preceded by: Rizal Djalil
- Succeeded by: Moermahadi Soerja Djanegara

Faction represented in People's Representative Council
- 2004–2014: Golkar

Other roles
- 1983–1986: Chairman of the Executive Council of Muslim Students' Association
- 2017–2021: Member of the Audit Board of Indonesia

Personal details
- Born: 25 April 1956 Tanjungpinang, Riau (now Riau Islands), Indonesia
- Died: 18 December 2021 (aged 65) Jakarta, Indonesia
- Citizenship: Indonesian
- Party: Golkar
- Spouse: Amanah Abdulkadir
- Children: Mina Azhar; Hanifah Azhar; Ibrahim Azhar
- Education: University of Oregon; Oklahoma State University–Stillwater
- Occupation: Politician

Harry Azhar Azis (25 April 1956 – 18 December 2021) was an Indonesian politician.

== Biography ==
Harry Azhar Azis was a legislator in the People's Representative Council from 2003 to 2014. He was the head of the Audit Board of Indonesia from 2014 to 2017 and then a member from 2019. During his tenure as a representative, Azis was also the chairman of the House Budget Committee and a member of multiple other committees such as Committee XI (in Indonesian) which is in charge of finance and banking. He was also the deputy secretary general for the Golkar party from 2009 to 2014.

Azis led significant contributions as a representative. In 2010, he was one of the first Indonesian legislators to suggest a bridge between Batam and Singapore as part of the Indonesia–Malaysia–Singapore Growth Triangle.

Azis lobbied to the Ministry of Finance (Indonesia) to allocate a specific budget for Indonesians who wish to pursue graduate education. His efforts succeeded to what is now known as Lembaga Pengelola Dana Pendidikan. His passion for education and bringing welfare to the people came from his father's wishes for his son to pursue education and improve his future.

Azis received his undergraduate degree from Sekolah Tinggi Manajemen Industri, Departemen Perindustrian RI, Jakarta in 1985. He later received his master's degree from University of Oregon in 1990 and his doctorate from Oklahoma State University in 2000, majoring in Agricultural Economy.

Harry Azhar Azis was an active leader in the growth of Indonesia. During his undergraduate years, Azis was entrusted to lead the Muslim Students' Association (Indonesia)(Himpunan Mahasiswa Islam), through 1983–1986. He was an active critic of the New Order (Indonesia). He remained active in the organization, being an active member of Majelis Nasional Korp Alumni HMI in 2017–2022.

Azis's background made him one of the economic experts of the Indonesian government. He received the Star of Mahaputera for his contributions to Indonesia on August, 15th 2019.

Azis died on 18 December 2021, at the age of 65 and is buried in National Heroes' Cemetery.
