= Luqman Hakim (politician) =

Indonesian politician (born 1975)

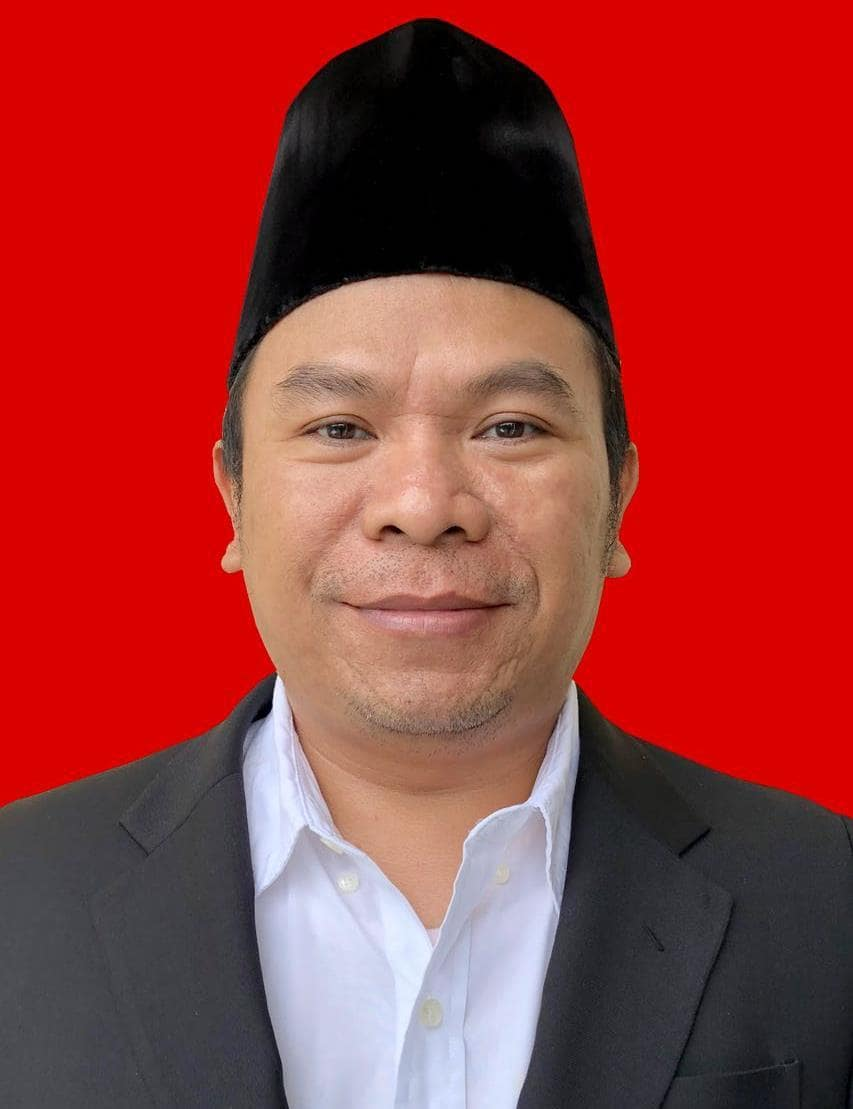

Member of the People's Representative Council
- In office 1 October 2019 – 1 October 2024

Personal details
- Born: 12 April 1975 Semarang, Central Java, Indonesia
- Party: National Awakening Party

Luqman Hakim (born 12 April 1975) is an Indonesian politician who served as a member of the People's Representative Council between 2019 and 2024, representing the Central Java VI electoral district, which includes the Magelang Regency, Purworejo Regency, Wonosobo Regency, and Magelang City. Luqman is a cadre of the National Awakening Party and is currently serving as a Deputy Chairman of the Second Commission.
