= Destry Damayanti =

Indonesian economist (born 1963)

- Official portrait, 2021

17th Governor of Bank Indonesia
- Incumbent
- Assumed office 2 September 2026 (Acting: 27 July – 2 September 2026)
- Senior Deputy Governor: Aida S. Budiman
- Preceded by: Perry Warjiyo

5th Senior Deputy Governor of Bank Indonesia
- In office 7 August 2019 – 27 July 2026
- Governor: Perry Warjiyo
- Preceded by: Mirza Adityaswara
- Succeeded by: Aida S. Budiman

Personal details
- Born: 16 December 1963 (age 62) Jakarta, Indonesia
- Education: University of Indonesia (S.E.); Cornell University (M.Sc.)
- Occupation: Banker, researcher, economist

Destry Damayanti (born December 16, 1963) is an economist, banker, and researcher who currently serves as Governor of Bank Indonesia for a term of five years (2026–2031). she was sworn in by the Chief Justice of the Supreme Court of the Republic of Indonesia on September 2, 2026 . Previously, Destry Damayanti was Senior Deputy Governor of Bank Indonesia for the 2019–2024 period and officially became Senior Deputy Governor of Bank Indonesia based on Presidential Decree No. 74/P of 2019 dated July 29, 2019 and took the oath on August 7, 2019, And she became the first female Governor of Bank Indonesia after Perry Warjiyo resigned from his position.

== Educations ==
Destry Damayanti completed her undergraduate studies at the Faculty of Economics, University of Indonesia. She then pursued her master's degree at Cornell University in New York, United States earning a Master of Science degree.

At her alma mater, Destry Damayanti was appointed Chair of the Faculty of Economics and Business, University of Indonesia Alumni Association, from 2019 to 2021.

== Career ==
=== Monetary Researcher ===
Destry Damayanti began her career as a research assistant at the Harvard Institute for International Development (HIID) in January–August 1989, then a researcher at the Institute of Management Faculty of Economics, University of Indonesia (August 1989–August 1990, and a researcher at the Inter-University Center for Economics, Faculty of Economics, University of Indonesia (August 1993–August 1995). After that, from August 1992 to March 1997, Destry worked at the Financial and Monetary Analysis Agency (BAKM) Ministry of Finance.

=== Economist ===
Destry has extensive experience working in the financial sector as an economist. She began her career at Citibank Indonesia from April 1997 to May 2000, served as Senior Economic Advisor to the British Ambassador from 2000 to 2003, was Chief Economist of Mandiri Sekuritas from 2005 to 2011, and was Chief Economist of Bank Mandiri from 2011 to 2015, as well as Head of the Economic Task Force of the Ministry of State-Owned Enterprises of the Republic of Indonesia from 2014 to 2015. .

=== Deposit Insurance Corporation ===
Destry Damayanti is recorded as having served as a member of the Board of Commissioners of the Deposit Insurance Corporation since September 24, 2015 based on Presidential Decree No. 158/M of 2015 dated September 21, 2015. Destry was also trusted by President Joko Widodo to be the Chair of the Selection Committee (Pansel) Corruption Eradication Commission on May 21, 2015 .

=== Bank Indonesia ===
In August 2019, she was appointed Senior Deputy Governor of Bank Indonesia. She was then re-elected to the same position for a second term.

In July 2026, Perry Warjiyo resigned from his position as Governor of Bank Indonesia, thus she temporarily filled the position. Then on September 2, 2026, she became the definitive Governor of Bank Indonesia for the 2026–2031 period, making her the first woman to hold that position (definitively).
