= Syamsurizal =

Indonesian politician (born 1955)

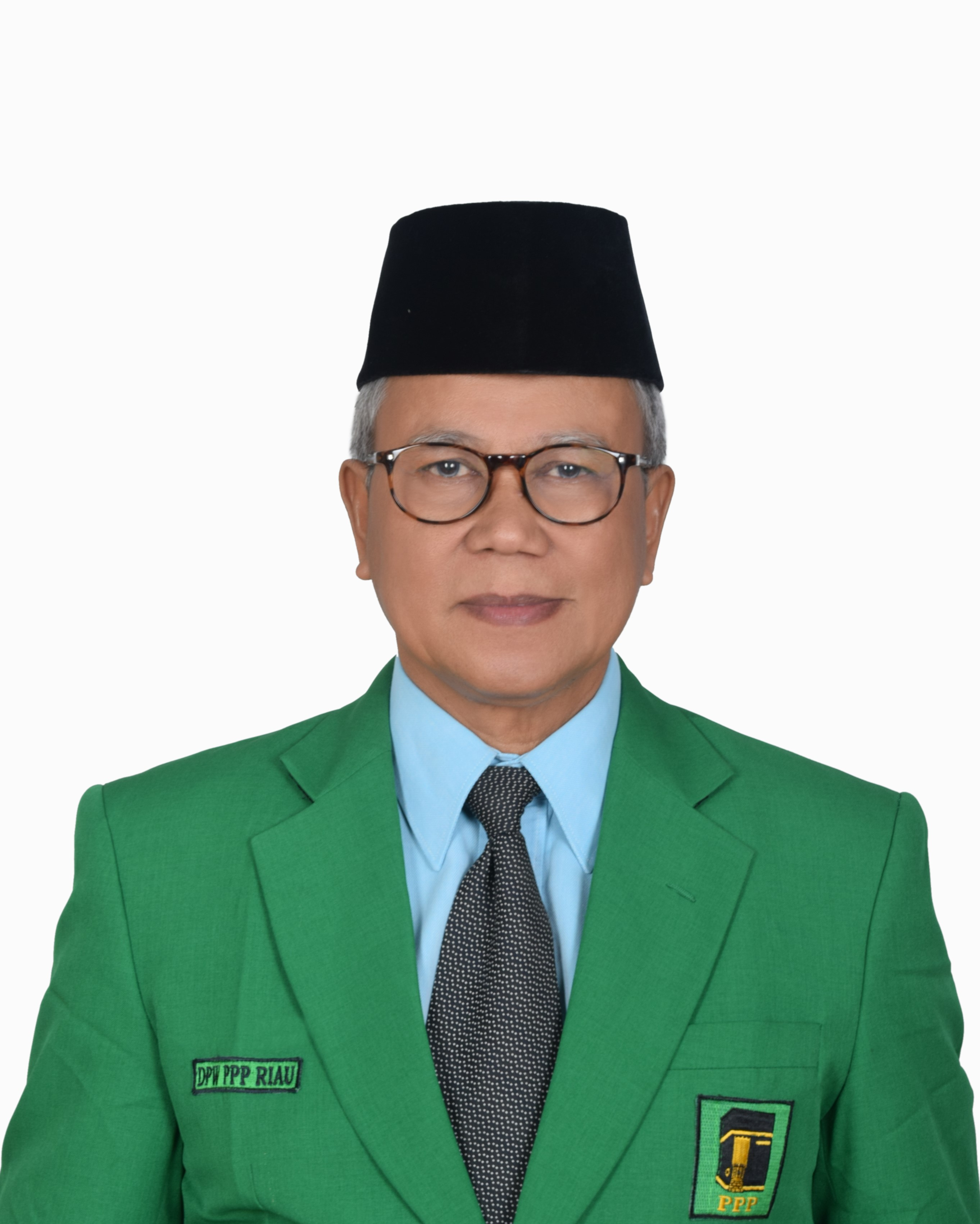
- Official portrait, 2019

Member of the House of Representatives
- In office 1 October 2019 – 1 October 2024

Personal details
- Born: 25 June 1955 (age 71) Selat Panjang, Riau, Indonesia
- Party: United Development Party
- Spouse: Fauziah Siregar
- Children: 6
- Education: University of Riau; Padjadjaran University; University of Malaya
- Occupation: Politician

Syamsurizal (born 25 June 1955) is an Indonesian politician. He served as a member of the House of Representatives from 2019 to 2024, representing the Riau I electoral district. Syamsurizal formerly served as 12th Regent of Bengkalis Regency from 2000 until 2010 and is a member of the United Development Party, currently serving as Vice Chairman of the Second Commission.

== Early life and education ==
Syamsurizal was born on 25 June 1955 in Selat Panjang, Riau. He started his junior school education at SD Negeri 1 Bengkalis from 1967 to 1970 and continued his middle school education at SMP Negeri 1 Bengkalis from 1970 to 1973. Syamsurizal completed his junior high school education at SMA Negeri 1 Bengkalis from 1973 to 1976 and during his time at high school, he served as head of sports at an intra-school organization from 1971 to 1973. He later went to the University of Riau majoring in corporate economics and graduated in 1980, and earned his master's degree from Padjadjaran University majoring in human resources in 2000. Syamsurizal earned his Ph.D from the University of Malaya majoring in economics and administration in 2010. During his time as a student, he served as a member of the student representative assembly from 1975 to 1977 and as general chairman of the student representative body from 1976 to 1979.

== Career ==
Syamsurizal started his career as a head of planning at the Regional Revenue Service of Riau Province from 1983 to 1996 and then served as the Head of the Regional Revenue Agency of Bengkalis Regency from 1997 to 1999. He subsequently served as Head of the Finance Bureau for the Riau Provincial Regional Secretariat from 1999 to 2000 and later served as Regent of Bengkalis from 2000 to 2005. Syamsuar also served as the Head of the Riau Province Regional Revenue Agency in 2000 and held the position of General Chairman of the Indonesian Sepak Takraw Association from 2004 to 2008. He then served again as Regent of Bengkalis from 2005 to 2010 and served as a Vice President at the International Sepaktakraw Federation from 2006 to 2012 and also served as a Vice President at the Asian Sepaktakraw Federation. Syamsurizal later served as the Head of the Riau Province Inspectorate from 2010 to 2015 and as a staff at the Research and Development Agency of the Ministry of Home Affairs of the Republic of Indonesia in 2010. He then served as acting Mayor of Pekanbaru in 2011 and served as the Expert Staff to the Governor of Riau in 2012.

== Personal life ==
Syamsurizal is married to Fauziah Siregar and has had six children.

== Controversy ==
On 30 April 2009, Syamsurizal drew public scrutiny due to the wedding celebration of his daughter, Siti Khairani, to Umar Aditiawarman, which was perceived as highly extravagant and attended by various officials and celebrities from Jakarta. What particularly caught the public's attention was the involvement of a number of civil servants from the Bengkalis Regency Government in the organization of the event. "Looking at the event program, it involved all the heads of the various departments and agencies across Bengkalis Regency. Only the Deputy Regent of Bengkalis was not included in the organizing committee, a reflection of the fact that the two have not been on good terms for some time," stated by the Executive Director of the Anti-Corruption Agency for the Inventory and Preservation of State Funds (BAK-Lipun), Abdul Rahman.
