= Darmin Nasution =

Indonesian economist and politician

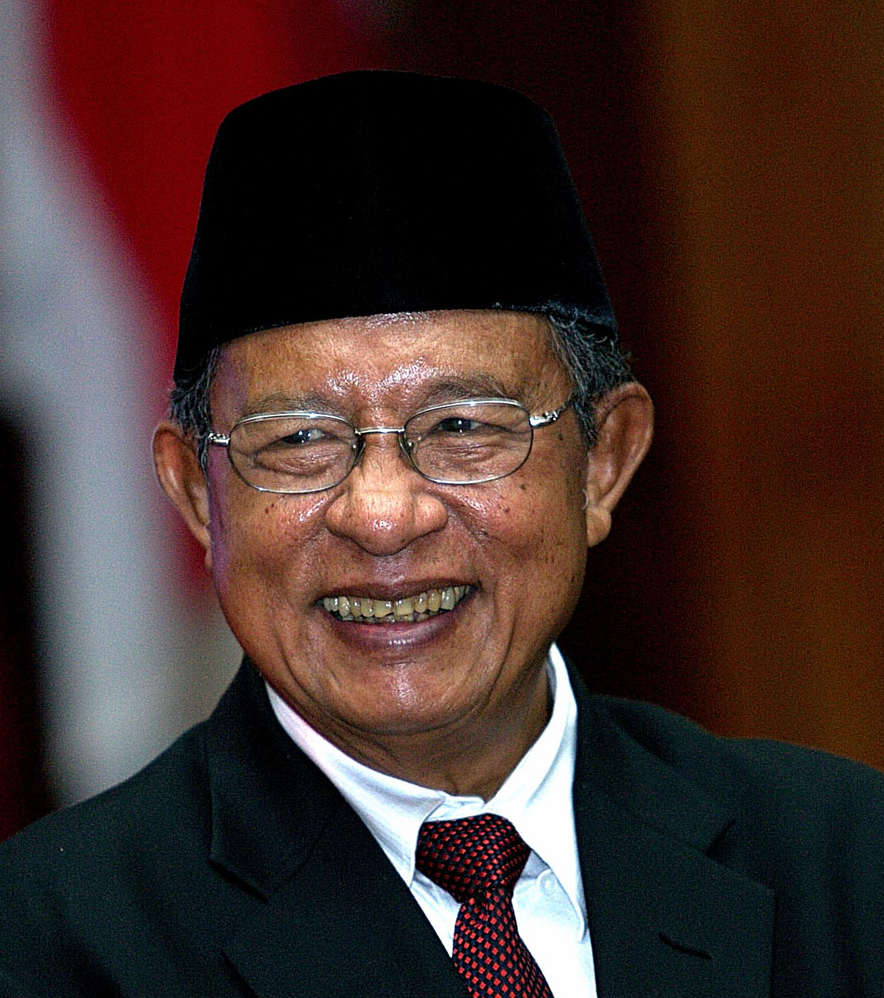
- Nasution in 2016

16th Coordinating Minister for Economic Affairs
- In office 12 August 2015 – 20 October 2019
- President: Joko Widodo
- Preceded by: Sofyan Djalil
- Succeeded by: Airlangga Hartarto

14th Governor of Bank Indonesia
- In office 1 September 2010 – 23 May 2013; Acting: 27 July 2009 – 1 September 2010
- President: Susilo Bambang Yudhoyono
- Preceded by: Boediono; Miranda Goeltom (Acting)
- Succeeded by: Agus Martowardojo

Senior Deputy Governor of Bank Indonesia
- In office 27 July 2009 – 1 September 2010
- President: Susilo Bambang Yudhoyono
- Governor: Himself (Acting)
- Preceded by: Miranda Goeltom
- Succeeded by: Mirza Adityaswara

Personal details
- Born: 21 December 1948 (age 77) Tapanuli, North Sumatra, Indonesia
- Party: Independent
- Spouse: Salsia Ulfa Sahabi Manoppo
- Children: 2
- Education: University of Indonesia (S.E.); Paris-Sorbonne University (D.E.A., Ph.D.)
- Profession: Economist

Darmin Nasution (born 21 December 1948) is an Indonesian economist and politician who served as Coordinating Minister for Economic Affairs from 2015 to 2019. He was previously Governor of Bank Indonesia, serving the role from 2010 to 2013 during Susilo Bambang Yudhoyono's administration.

Before taking up various positions within the Indonesian government, Nasution was a faculty member at the University of Indonesia School of Economics, where he was Deputy Chair of the Lembaga Penyelidikan Ekonomi dan Masyarakat (LPEM, or Institute for Economic and Social Research) from 1987, and Head of the LPEM from 1989.

== Early life and education ==
Nasution was born on 21 December 1948 in Pasar Maga, North Sumatra to a Batak family. He graduated with a Bachelor's degree in Economics from the University of Indonesia, in 1976, and received his Master's and Doctorate degrees in the same major from the University of Paris, France in 1986.

== Ministry of Finance ==
Nasution served as Director General of Financial Institutions in the Indonesian Ministry of Finance from 2000–2005. He was subsequently appointed chairman of Indonesia's Capital Market and Financial Institution Supervisory Agency in 2006 and was later transferred to the post of Director General of Taxation in the Ministry of Finance.

== Bank Indonesia ==
In July 2009 Nasution was appointed Senior Deputy Governor of Bank Indonesia. He was sworn into office on 27 July 2009. Nasution immediately became acting governor of Bank Indonesia because the previous governor, Boediono, had resigned several months earlier in May to run for election as Vice President of Indonesia as a teammate of President Susilo Bambang Yudhoyono.

Nasution was subsequently appointed Governor of Bank Indonesia on 1 September 2010, after parliamentary hearings to consider his nomination as governor. He was succeeded as governor when Agus Martowardojo was appointed in May 2013.

== Coordinating Economics Minister ==
On 12 August 2015, in a cabinet reshuffle by President Joko Widodo, Nasution was appointed the Coordinating Minister of Economics, replacing Sofyan Djalil in the post.
