= Adrianus Mooy =

Indonesian economist (born 1936)

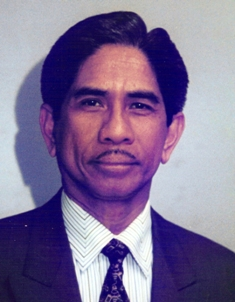
- Mooy as Ambassador of Indonesia to Belgium

Indonesian Ambassador to the European Communities
- In office 1993–1995
- President: Suharto
- Preceded by: Atmono Suryo
- Succeeded by: Pudji Kuntarso

9th Governor of Bank Indonesia
- In office 1988–1993
- President: Suharto
- Preceded by: Arifin Siregar
- Succeeded by: J. Soedradjad Djiwandono

Personal details
- Born: 10 April 1936 (age 90) Rote, Dutch East Indies
- Education: Gadjah Mada University; University of Wisconsin
- Profession: Economist

Adrianus Mooy (born 10 April 1936) is an Indonesian economist and diplomat. He held the office of Governor of Bank of Indonesia, serving the role from 1988 to 1993 during Soeharto's reign.

He served as Executive Secretary of the United Nations Economic and Social Commission for Asia and the Pacific (ESCAP) in 1995—2000. He studied at Gadjah Mada University and University of Wisconsin. From 1993 to 1995, he was appointed as Ambassador of Indonesia to Belgium. He also held the post of the Rector of Pelita Harapan University Surabaya from 2010 until 2018.

On 13 May 2014, he was awarded an honorary doctorate from Corban University in Oregon in the United States.

Government offices
Preceded by Arifin Siregar	Governor of Bank Indonesia; 1988-1993	Succeeded by J. Soedradjad Djiwandono
Diplomatic posts
Preceded by T.M. Zahirsjah	Ambassador of Indonesia to Belgium; 1993-1995	Succeeded by Sabana Kartasasmita
