= Michelle Wibowo =

British sugar craft artist (born 1978)

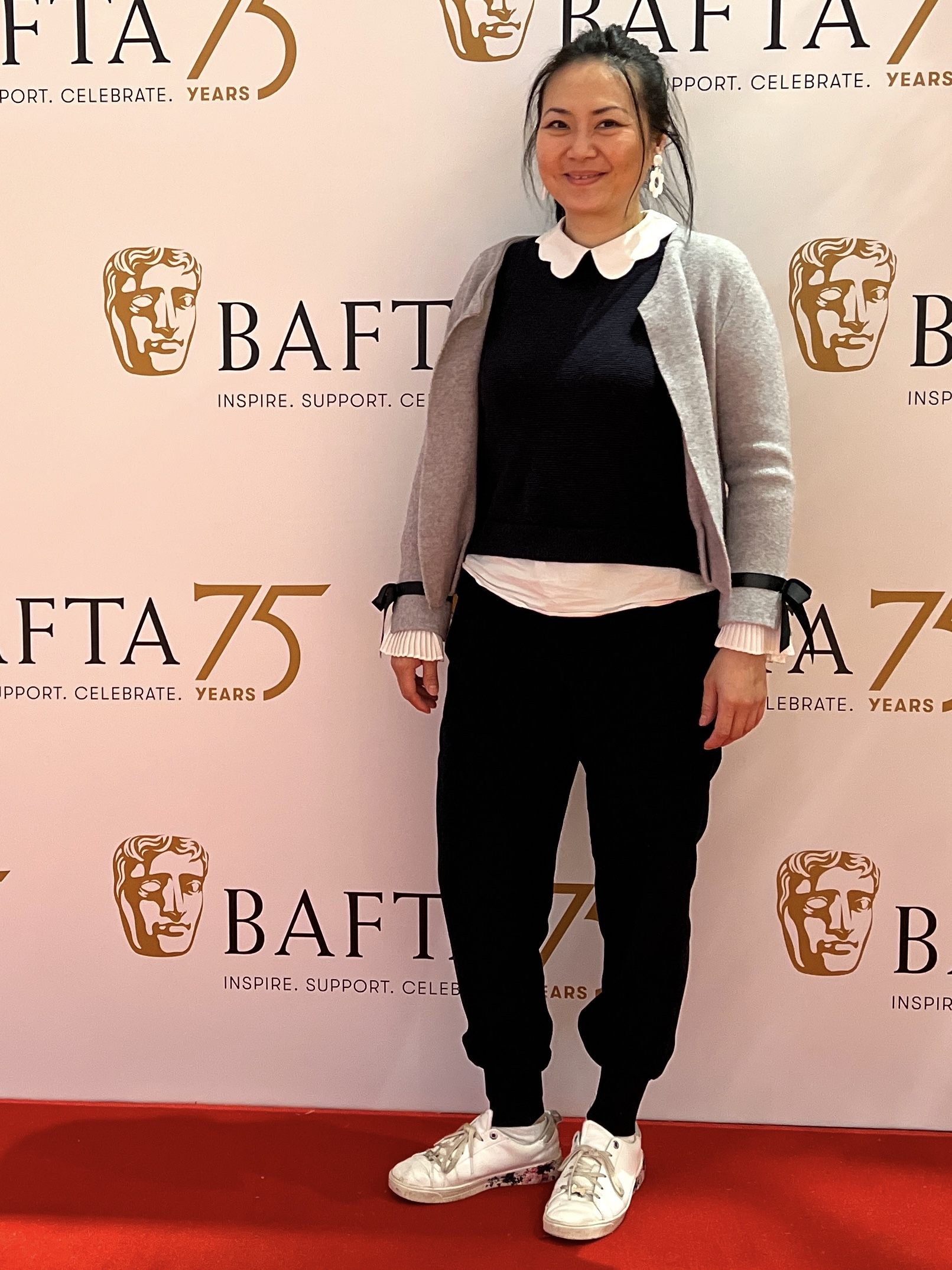
- Wibowo at BAFTA's 75th Anniversary
- Born: Michelle Angeline Wibowo; Semarang, Indonesia
- Occupations: Baker; Sculptor; Author
- Years active: 2008–present
- Website: michellesugarart.com

Michelle Wibowo (born 1978, Indonesia) is a British sugar craft artist whose specialty is making sculpted cakes and sugar sculptures.

== Early life ==
Wibowo was born and grew up in Semarang, Central Java, Indonesia. She studied architecture at a university in Indonesia. She migrated to the United Kingdom and graduated from the National Bakery School. From the age of 9, she develops her love for baking by baking with her mom.

== Career ==
Her first international success was in October 2008 when she was awarded a gold and silver medal for her creations in International Exhibition of Culinary Art in Germany. She created a lifesize hound dog shape sugar sculpture which won her gold and picked up silver for a cake of Elizabeth I of England.

In July 2009, she created a giant cupcake measuring 2 meters by 1.25 meters, to feed thousands of Covent Garden real food market visitor.

In September 2010, Wibowo's creation is on display as part of Experimental Food Society Spectacular with other Britain's leading food artists.

Wibowo appeared in the Channel 4 reality TV series Extreme Cake Makers which aired from January 2018 to October 2019.

On 15 November 2021, Wibowo created a giant Harry Potter Hogwarts cake that made appearance in the ITV's This Morning (TV programme) which later was cut by the hosts Phillip Schofield and Holly Willoughby.
