= Audit Board of Indonesia =

Supreme audit institution of Indonesia

- Badan Pemeriksa Keuangan Republik Indonesia

Agency overview
- Formed: 28 December 1946; 79 years ago
- Preceding agency: Dutch Court of Audit
- Jurisdiction: Government of Indonesia
- Headquarters: Jakarta
- Motto: Tri Dharma Arthasantosha ("Three Principles—the Pancasila, the Constitution, and Audit Principles —for Financial Tranquility")
- Employees: 8,526 (2021)
- Annual budget: Rp 3.71 trillion
- Agency executive: Isma Yatun, Chairwoman
- Key document: Articles 23E, 23F, and 23G of the 1945 State Constitution of the Republic of Indonesia
- Website: www.bpk.go.id/en

The Audit Board of Indonesia (Indonesian: Badan Pemeriksa Keuangan Republik Indonesia, lit. 'Financial Audit Board of the Republic of Indonesia', BPK RI) is a high state body in Indonesia which is responsible for evaluation of management and accountability of state finances conducted by the central government, local governments, Bank Indonesia, state-owned enterprises, the Public Service Board, and institutions or other entities which manage state finances.

== History ==
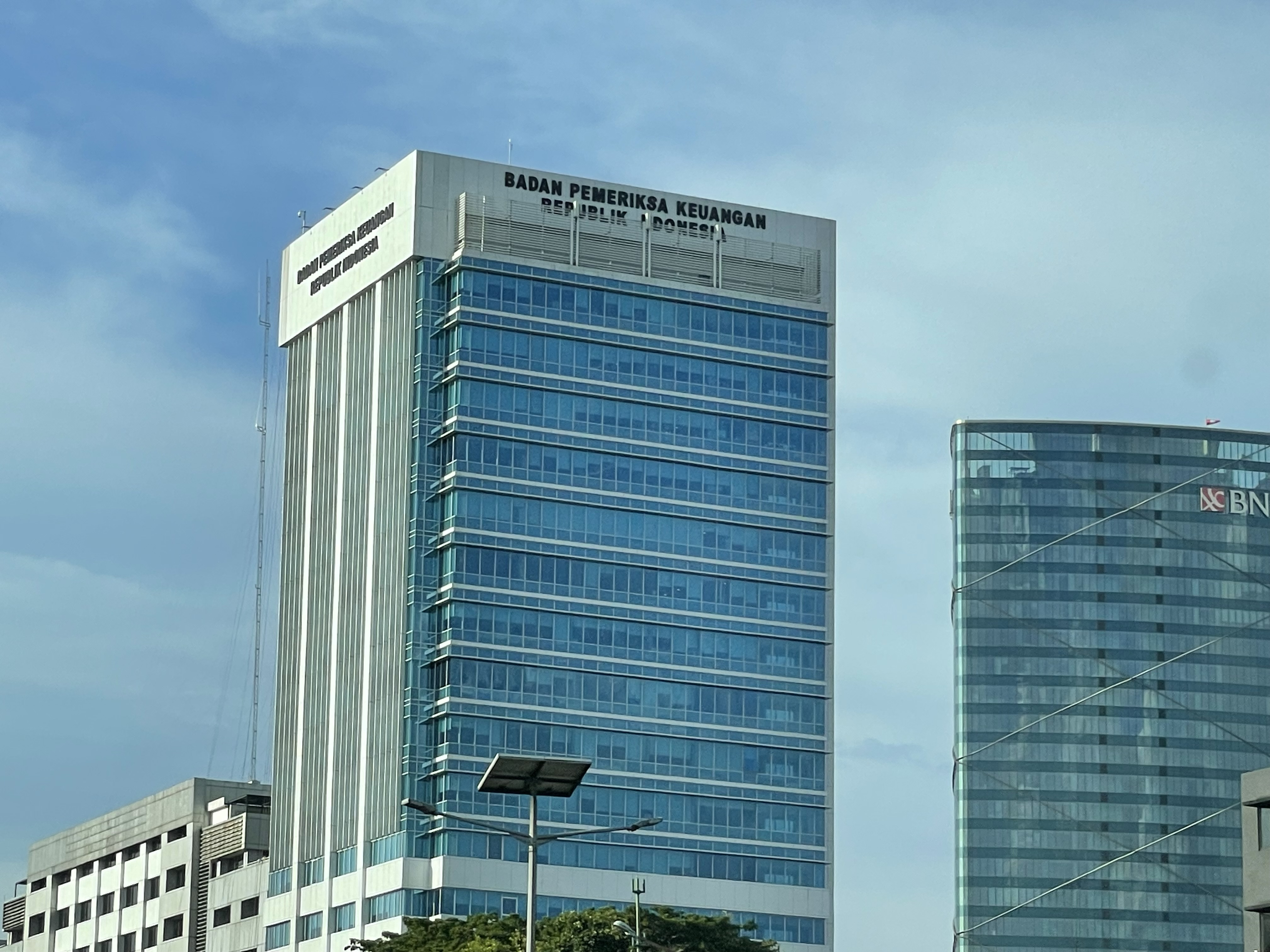
Audit Board of Indonesia office in Jakarta

The body was initially established under the name National Supervision Board at Magelang, Central Java during the United States of Indonesia period on 28 December 1946. The Board currently functions under the latest revision to the laws governing it dating to 2006. The Board has increasingly tackled environmental issues, revealing in 2014 that the Ciliwung River had been polluted by seventeen separate companies, submitting its report to the police.

As of 2015, the Audit Board of Indonesia was chairing the International Organization of Supreme Audit Institutions' Working Group on Environmental Auditing.

In 2016, Board chairman Harry Azhar Azis was implicated in the Panama Papers due to a previously registered blank company which he hadn't reported. Azis claimed that the company was merely a registered name on paper which he had started for his oldest daughter, but then sold to someone else after his appointment as Board chairman in December 2014.

== Chair of the Audit Board ==
The following people have held the position of Chair of the Audit Board since 1947.

Name	Begin	End
R. Soerasno	1947	1949
R. Kasirman	1949	1957
Abdul Karim Pringgodigdo	1957	1961
I Gusti Ketut Pudja	1961	1964
Sri Sultan Hamengkubuwono IX	1964	1966
Dadang Suprayogi	1966	1973
Umar Wirahadikusumah	1973	1983
M. Jusuf	1983	1993
J. B. Sumarlin	1993	1998
Satrio Budihardjo Joedono	1998	2004
Anwar Nasution	2005	2009
Hadi Poernomo	2009	2014
Rizal Djalil	2014	2014
Harry Azhar Azis	2014	2017
Moermahadi Soerja Djanegara	2017	2019
Agung Firman Sampurna	2019	2022
Isma Yatun	2022	present

== Powers ==
The Board is the highest body within the Indonesian government in terms of state financial accountability and management. Their work ranges from the national to local levels, and they have offices in every province in Indonesia.

== See also ==
- Court of Audit
- Algemene Rekenkamer
