= Chatib Basri =

Indonesian economist and politician

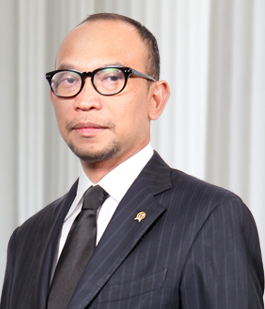
- Basri in 2013

28th Minister of Finance
- In office 21 May 2013 – 20 October 2014
- President: Susilo Bambang Yudhyono
- Preceded by: Agus Martowardojo
- Succeeded by: Bambang Brodjonegoro

15th Head of the Investment Coordinating Board
- In office 14 June 2012 – 1 October 2013
- President: Susilo Bambang Yudhyono
- Preceded by: Gita Wirjawan
- Succeeded by: Mahendra Siregar

Personal details
- Born: Muhammad Chatib Basri; 22 August 1965 (age 61) Jakarta, Indonesia
- Education: University of Indonesia; Australian National University

Muhammad Chatib "Dede" Basri (born 22 August 1965) is an Indonesian economist who served as Minister of Finance in the Second United Indonesia Cabinet from 21 May 2013 to 20 October 2014 during the presidency of Susilo Bambang Yudhoyono. Before he was appointed Minister of Finance he was the head of the Indonesian Investment Coordinating Board (Badan Kordinasi Penanaman Modal, or BKPM).

He is now a Visiting Scholar at the Harvard Center for International Development and also Visiting Professor in Practice at the London School of Economics and Political Science (CETEx)

He currently serves on the National Economic Council of the President of the Republic of Indonesia, the country’s top advisory body composed of academics, business leaders, investment bankers, and former senior officials.

He is Co-Chair of the Pandemic Fund for Pandemic Prevention, Preparedness, and Response, hosted by the World Bank with support from the WHO. He also serves on the Governing Board of the Lee Kuan Yew School of Public Policy, National University of Singapore. Internationally, he serves on several high-level advisory councils, including the World Bank Advisory Council on Gender and Development, the Independent High-Level Expert Group on Climate Finance for the COP, and the Advisory Board of the Centre for Applied Macroeconomic Analysis at the Australian National University.

He was, amongst other roles, an advisor to the former Indonesian Minister of Finance Sri Mulyani Indrawati Deputy Chair of the president's Economic National Committee (Komite Ekonomi Nasional, or KEN), and was Sherpa to the president of Indonesia for G-20 meetings.

Basri has a PhD from the Australian National University. He also teaches in the Faculty of Economics at the University of Indonesia (FEUI) and was Director of the Lembaga Penyelidikan Ekonomi dan Masyarakat (Institute for Economic and Social Research, or LPEM) within the FEUI and Ash Centre Senior Fellow at the Harvard Kennedy School 2015–2016. He was also a fellow at the Centre on Global Transformation University of California, San Diego He is now a member of the Advisory Board of Centre for Applied Macroeconomic Analysis at the Australian National University.

In 2024, he was honored to be named an IEA Fellow by the International Economic Association, in recognition of his contributions to research, writing, and policymaking.

Dede Basri's areas of expertise include international trade, macroeconomics, and political economy. As an academic economist, he has published in various economic journals such as American Economic Review, Oxford Review of Economic Policy, World Economy, Asian Economic Policy Review, Asian Economic Papers, and the Bulletin of Indonesian Economic Studies. He was also a Thee Kian Wie Distinguished Visiting Professor at the Australian National University and an adjunct fellow in the Arndt-Corden Department of Economics at the Australian National University. Dr.Basri was also a member of the Group of Eminent Personalities of the OECD Development Centre.

== Early life and education ==
Muhammad Chatib Basri was born on 22 August 1965 in Jakarta, Indonesia, as the child of Chairul Basri and Nurbaiti. His father was from Rao, Pasaman Regency. He is the nephew of writer Asrul Sani. During his childhood, Basri wanted to became a writer like his uncle. He went to Faculty of Economic and Business at University of Indonesia and graduated in 1992, earned the title of "the most outstanding student". Basri earned his master's degree from Australian National University in 1996 majoring in economic development and earned his Ph.D from the same university in 2001.

== Personal life ==
Basri is married to Dana Iswara Basri, a journalist.

== Career ==
Basri started his career as a researcher assistant at Department of Economics, Research School of Pacific and Asian Studies in 1994 for seven years. He also became a lecturer and researcher at the Institute for Economic and Social Research (LPEM) at University of Indonesia until 2001. Basri then worked at several educational institutions both at home and abroad, and worked as a consultant in various financial institutions, such as World Bank, United States Agency for International Development, Australian Aid, OECD, UN Trade and Development, Asian Development Bank and become a member of the Asia and Pacific Regional Advisory Group of the International Monetary Fund.

Political offices
Preceded by Agus Martowardojo	Minister of Finance; 2013–2014	Succeeded by Bambang Brodjonegoro
