= Agus Martowardojo =

Indonesian politician

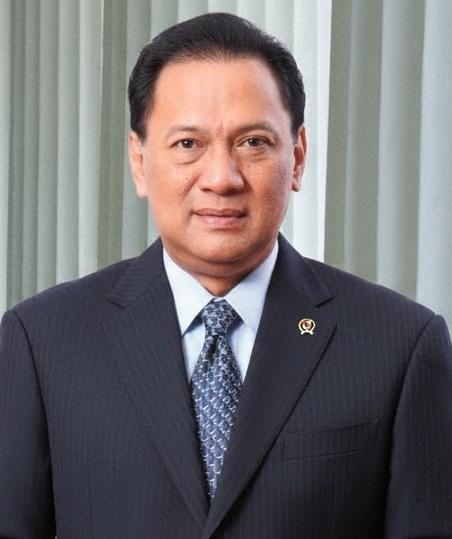
- Agus in 2012

15th Governor of Bank Indonesia
- In office 24 May 2013 – 24 May 2018
- President: Susilo Bambang Yudhoyono; Joko Widodo
- Preceded by: Darmin Nasution
- Succeeded by: Perry Warjiyo

27th Minister of Finance
- In office 20 May 2010 – 19 April 2013
- President: Susilo Bambang Yudhoyono
- Deputy: Anny Ratnawati; Mahendra Siregar
- Preceded by: Sri Mulyani
- Succeeded by: Chatib Basri

Personal details
- Born: Agus Dermawan Wintarto Martowardojo; 24 January 1956 (age 70) Amsterdam, Netherlands
- Spouse: Nies Berliantin
- Education: University of Indonesia
- Profession: Economist; Banker; Bureaucrat

Agus Dermawan Wintarto Martowardojo (Note: Consistent with Javanese custom, he is usually referred with by his first name, Agus.) (born 24 January 1956) is an Indonesian economist and banker who served as Governor of Bank Indonesia, Indonesia's central bank, from 2013 to 2018. Previously, he served as Minister of Finance from 2010 to 2013 after succeeding former minister Sri Mulyani Indrawati, who resigned from the office and took position as Managing Director of the World Bank Group.

== Early career ==
Agus was born in Amsterdam, Netherlands. After graduating from University of Indonesia's Faculty of Economics in 1984, he became an international loan officer at the Indonesian branch of Bank of America. Agus has a long career as one of top bankers in Indonesia. He was the Chief Executive Officer of Bank Mandiri, the largest bank in Indonesia, between 2005 and 2010. He was the President Director of Bank Bumiputera (1995–1998) and President Director of Bank Ekspor Impor Indonesia (1998–1999).

His performance as head of Bank Mandiri was considered successful, as he slashed non-performing loans and raised the bank's profile among international investors. He also increased profits in the banks. In 2008 for example, the bank paid $418m in dividends to the shareholders. He was also instrumental in helping the Finance Ministry in recovering Rp 1.23 trillion (US$133.15 million) of state money from Tommy Soeharto, son of late former president Soeharto.

== Minister of Finance ==
Following the resignation of Sri Mulyani, Agus was appointed as Finance Minister in the Second United Indonesia Cabinet. His selection was greeted positively by analysts as he was considered to have managerial skills required for the position. He also has wide international experience and has represented Indonesia in G20 forums.

In March 2011 he announced his first fiscal policy as Finance Minister with a focus on promoting real sector growth and investment intended to spur Indonesia’s economic growth. Highlights of the new regulations included removing the value added tax (VAT) for the sale of houses worth less than Rp 70 million (US$7,910) compared with the previous Rp 55 million; eliminating taxes on the sales of cooking oil and bulk cooking oil for the poor; and providing in advance 50 percent of the funds needed by the State Logistics Agency (Bulog) for the rice for the poor program.

== Governor of Bank Indonesia ==
In 2008, following resignation of Boediono as Governor of Bank Indonesia to run as Vice President of Indonesia as the running mate of Susilo Bambang Yudhoyono, Agus was nominated as one of candidates for Governor. However his nomination was rejected by the national Legislature, apparently for political reasons. On 22 February 2013, President Susilo Bambang Yudhoyono surprisingly named Agus as his sole candidate for the governorship, replacing Darmin Nasution. On 27 March 2013, the Indonesian House of Representatives' Finance Commission confirmed Agus as governor of Bank Indonesia for the period of 2013–2018. Agus won 46 votes of support and seven votes against. One member abstained from the vote.

== Notes ==
Government offices
Preceded by Darmin Nasution	Governor of Bank Indonesia; 2013–2018	Succeeded by Perry Warjiyo
Political offices
Preceded by Sri Mulyani	Minister of Finance; 2010–2013	Succeeded by Chatib Basri
