= Bank Indonesia =

Central Bank of Indonesia

Coordinates: 6°10′54″S 106°49′17″E

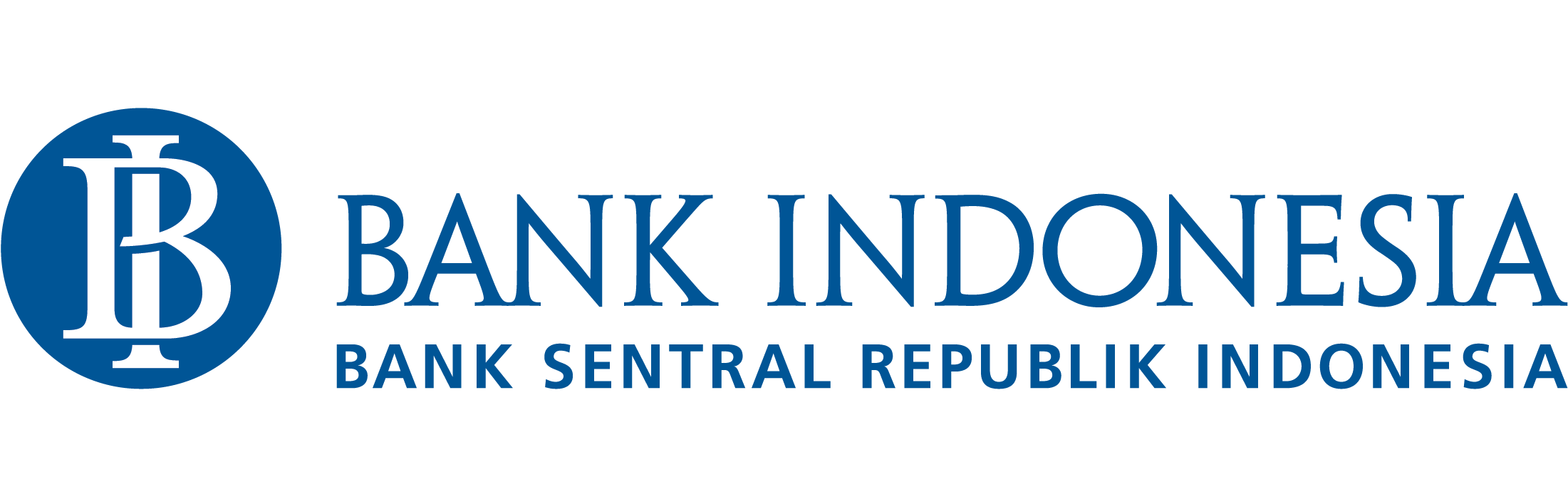
- Bank Indonesia headquarters in Central Jakarta
- Central bank of: Indonesia
- Headquarters: Central Jakarta, Jakarta
- Established: 24 January 1828; 198 years ago (Bank of Java); 1 July 1953; 73 years ago (current form)
- Governor: Destry Damayanti
- Currency: Indonesian rupiah IDR (ISO 4217)
- Reserves: USD 136.4 billion
- Website: bi.go.id

Bank Indonesia (BI; lit. 'Bank of Indonesia') is the central bank of the Republic of Indonesia. It replaced the Bank of Java in 1953, which had been created in 1828 to serve the financial needs of the Dutch East Indies.

== History ==
=== Bank of Java ===
King William I of the Netherlands granted the right to create a private bank in the Indies in 1826, which was named De Javasche Bank. It was founded on 24 January 1828 and later became the bank of issue of the Dutch East Indies. The bank regulated and issued the Netherlands Indies gulden.

In 1881, an office of the Bank of Java was opened in Amsterdam. Later followed the opening of an office in New York. By 1930 the bank owned sixteen office branches in the Dutch East Indies: Bandung, Cirebon, Semarang, Yogyakarta, Surakarta, Surabaya, Malang, Kediri, Banda Aceh, Medan, Padang, Palembang, Banjarmasin, Pontianak, Makassar, and Manado. Almost all buildings were designed by the Amsterdam architect Eduard Cuypers (1859–1927) in collaboration with M. J. Hulswit (1862–1921) and A. A. Fermont (1882–1967) in Batavia.

The Bank of Java was operated as a private bank and individuals as well as industries etc. could get help in the bank's offices.

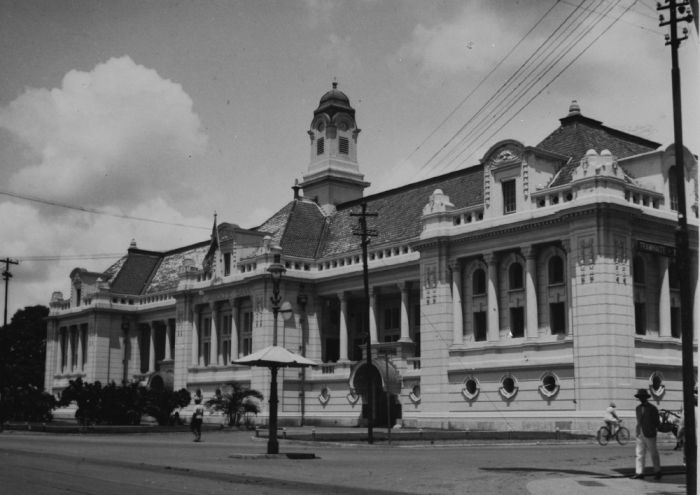
Head office of the Bank of Java in Batavia, now the Museum Bank Indonesia in Jakarta

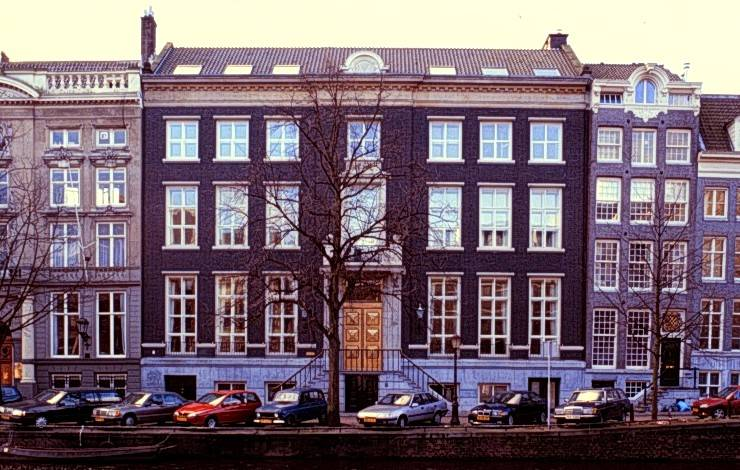
Keizersgracht 666-668, former office of the Bank of Java in Amsterdam

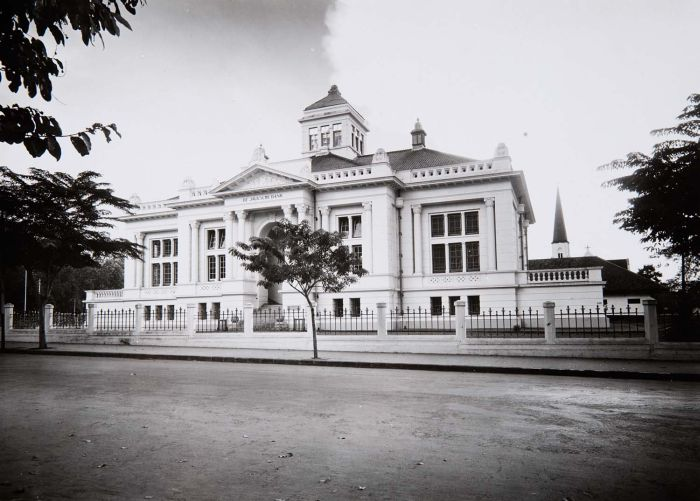
Branch of De Javasche Bank in Bandung, built in 1918; now a museum

=== Bank Indonesia ===
Bank Indonesia was founded on 1 July 1953 from the nationalisation of De Javasche Bank, three years after the recognition of Indonesia's independence by Netherlands.

For the next 15 years, Bank Indonesia carried on commercial activities as well as acted as the nation's national bank and was in charge of issuing Indonesian rupiah currency. This came to an end with the Act No. 13 of 1968 on the Central Bank, transforming Bank Indonesia as a central bank.

The act was subsequently replaced by Act No. 23 of 1999, giving the bank independence from governmental control. Thereafter, the bank reported to the parliament (DPR) instead of the President, and the bank's governor was no longer a member of the cabinet.

== Organization ==
The bank is led by the board of governors, comprising the governor, a senior deputy governor and between four and seven deputy governors.

The governor and deputy governors serve a five-year term, and are eligible for re-election for a maximum of three terms. The governor and senior deputy governor are nominated and appointed by the president, with approval from the DPR. Deputy governors are nominated by the governor and appointed by the president, with approval of the DPR. The president has no power to dismiss a member of the board, except when a board member voluntarily resigns, is permanently disabled, or is proven guilty of criminal offence. The senior deputy governor acts as governor in the case of the latter's office vacancy.

The Board of Governors Meeting is Bank Indonesia's highest decision-making forum. At least one meeting must be convened each month to determine general monetary policy.

The Bank is active in promoting financial inclusion policy and is a member of the Alliance for Financial Inclusion. It hosted AFI's second annual Global Policy Forum (GPF) in Bali, Indonesia in 2010. Bank Indonesia's Maya Declaration commitments covered financial identity, financial literacy, microsavings, a regulatory framework and a national strategy.

By 30 December 2013, the bank's microprudential supervision functions will be transferred to Financial Services Authority (OJK). In the future, the bank will maintain Indonesian financial system and monetary stability through mixture of monetary and macroprudential instruments and policies. The Financial Services Authority institutive law (law n° 21 of 2011 enacted on 31 December 2012) followed the US$710 million baylout of Bank Century and the receivership 21 other national private banks.

== Strategic objectives ==
The Bank describes its strategic objectives as being:

1. Maintain monetary stability
2. Maintain the financial sustainability of the Bank of Indonesia
3. Strengthen the effectiveness of monetary management
4. Create a sound and effective banking system and financial system stability
5. Maintain the security and effectiveness of the payment system
6. Increase the effectiveness of Good Governance implementation
7. Strengthen the organisation and build highly competent human resources with the support of a knowledge-based work culture
8. Integrate the Bank of Indonesia's transformation in line with Bank Indonesia's destination statement of 2008

=== National Payment Gateway ===
The aim is to integrate all Automated Teller Machines in ASEAN countries, beginning with integration first in each country. On 16 January 2012 interconnection between Bank Mandiri ATMs and Bank Central Asia ATMs (Prima ATMs) was launched.

=== Bank Indonesia Liquidity Support ===
Bank Indonesia Liquidity Support is an Indonesian government policy that was formulated with Bank Indonesia in the crisis period and executed by Bank Indonesia to rescue the monetary and banking system as well as the economy as a whole. It was partly based on the instruction and command of the President in the limited meeting of economic, finance, and development supervision and production and distribution on 3 September 1997.

This policy was provided under various emergency lending schemes (Fasilitas Diskonto I/Fasdis I, Fasdis II, Fasilitas SBPU, Fasilitas SBPUK, Fasilitas Diskonto Baru and Dana Talangan).

=== Project Nexus ===
The Bank for International Settlements signed an agreement with Central Bank of Malaysia, Bank of Thailand, Bangko Sentral ng Pilipinas, Monetary Authority of Singapore, and the Reserve Bank of India on 30 June 2024 as founding member of Project Nexus, a multilateral international initiative to enable retail cross-border payments. Bank Indonesia involved as a special observer. The platform, which is expected to go live by 2026, will interlink domestic fast payment systems of the member countries.

== Offices ==
BI operates 46 offices across Indonesia, and five representative offices in New York City, London, Tokyo, Singapore and Beijing. In addition, Bank Indonesia also operates several museums housed in the former De Javasche Bank office buildings, such as Jakarta (located in the former De Javasche Bank head office building in old Jakarta), Surabaya, and Padang.

=== Indonesian offices ===
Bank Indonesia has branches in almost all major cities of Indonesia.

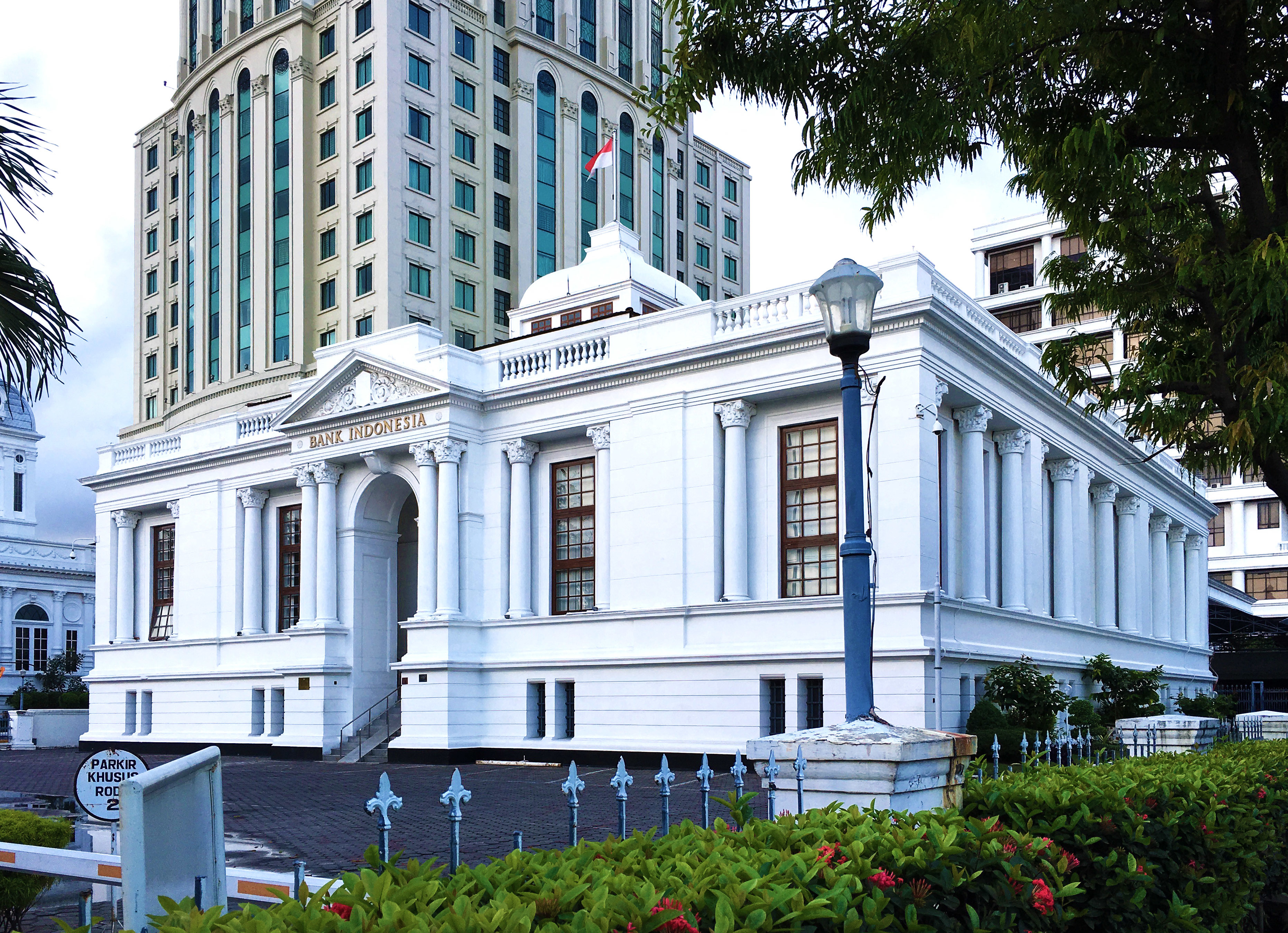
Bank Indonesia in Medan

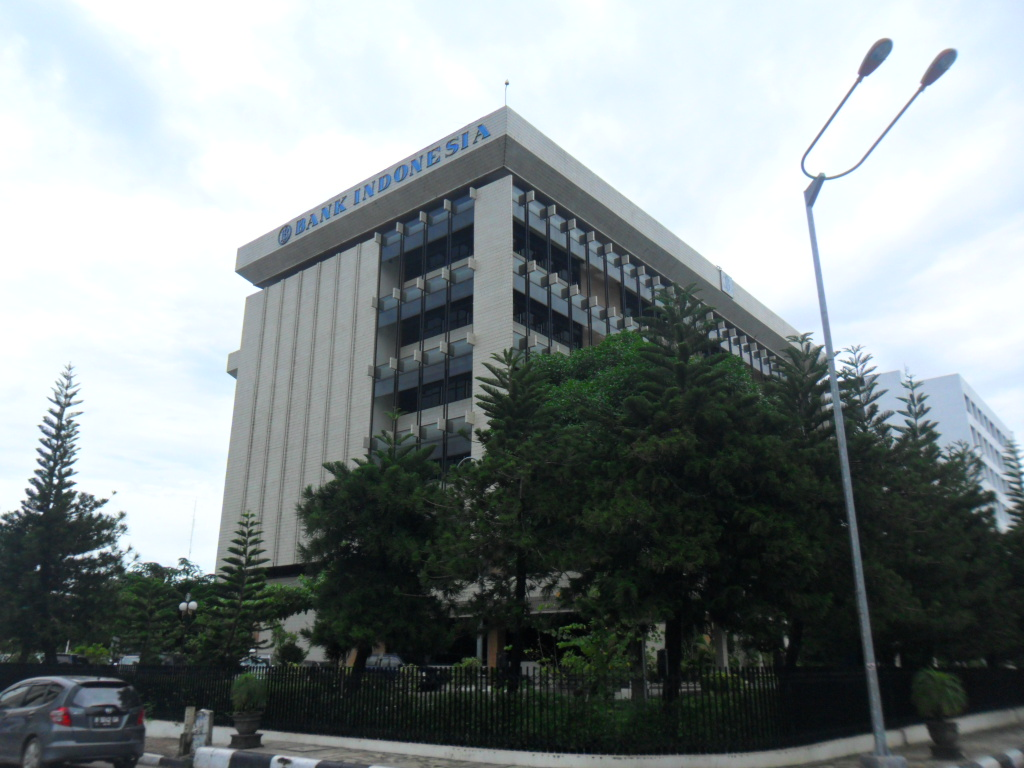
Bank Indonesia in Banjarmasin

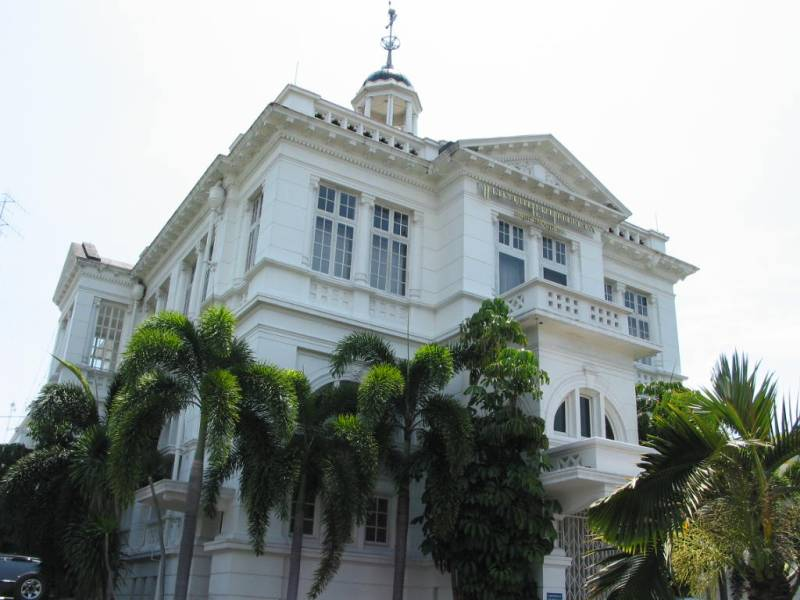
Bank Indonesia in Surakarta

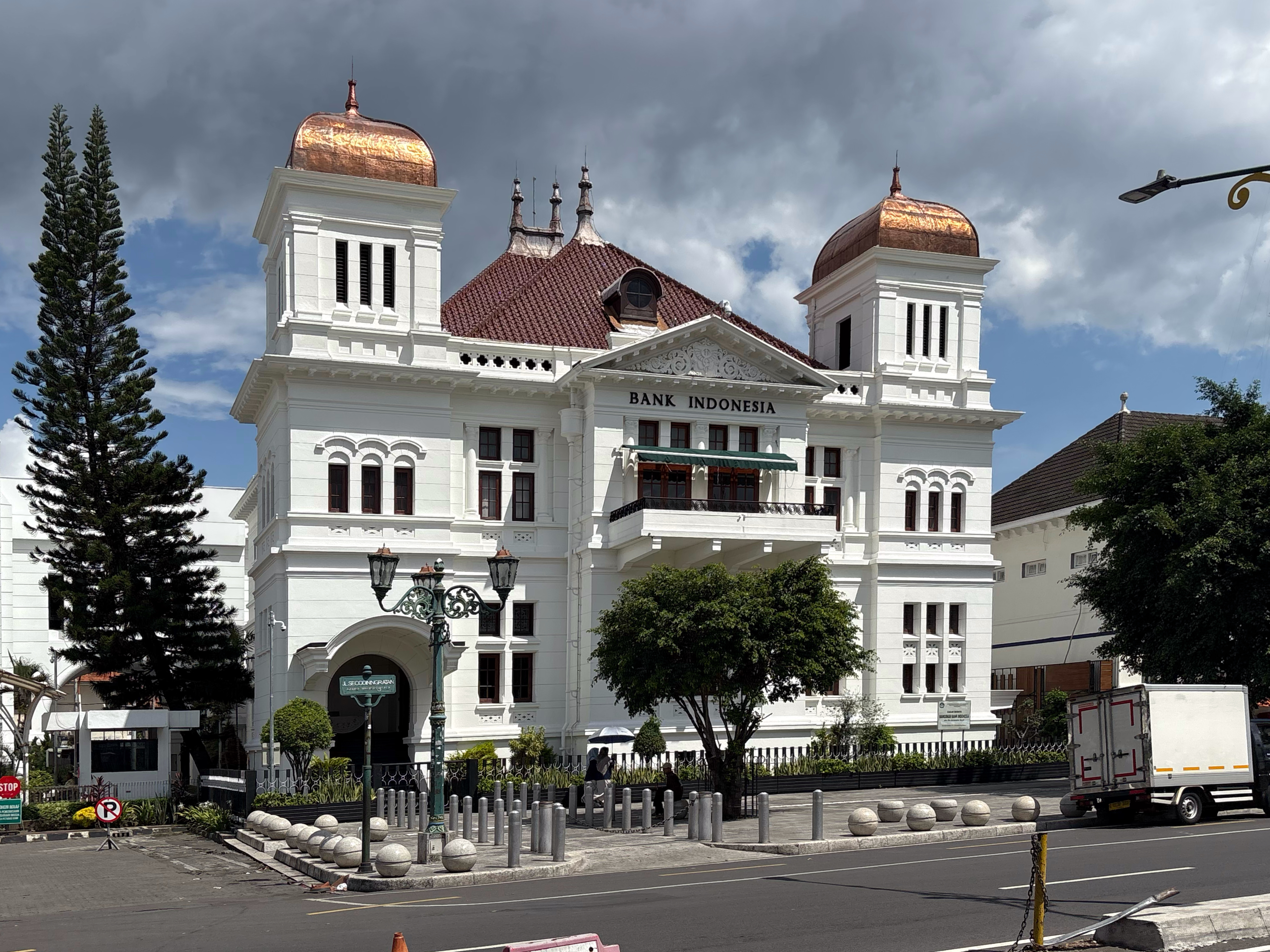
Bank Indonesia in Yogyakarta

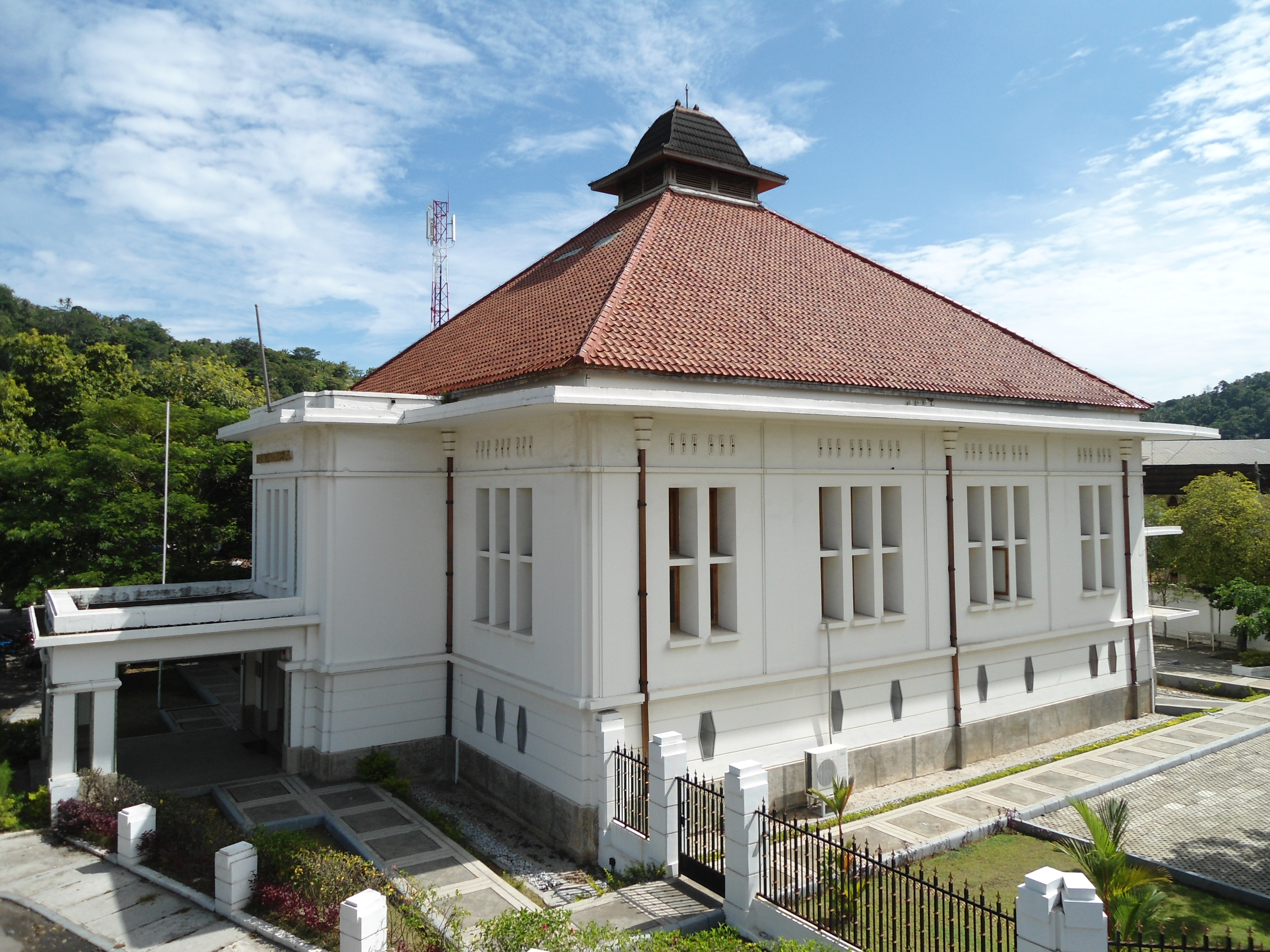
Bank Indonesia in Padang

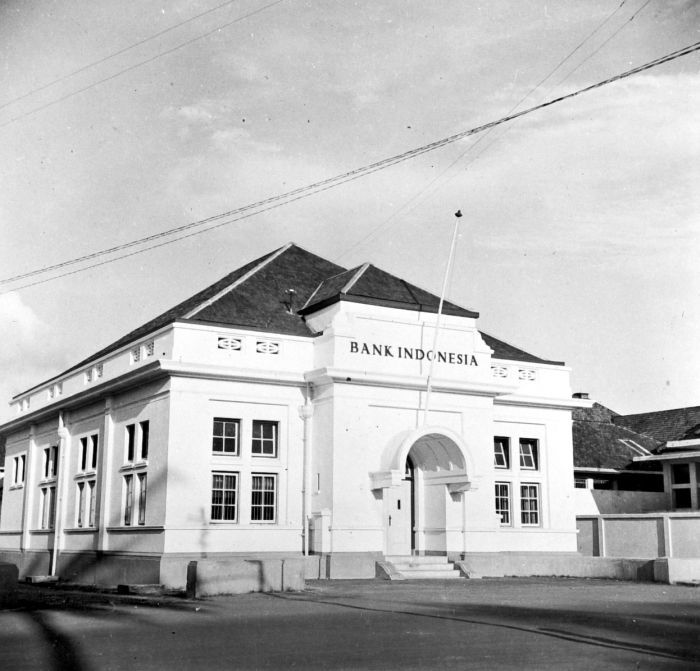
Bank Indonesia in Palembang (1950s)

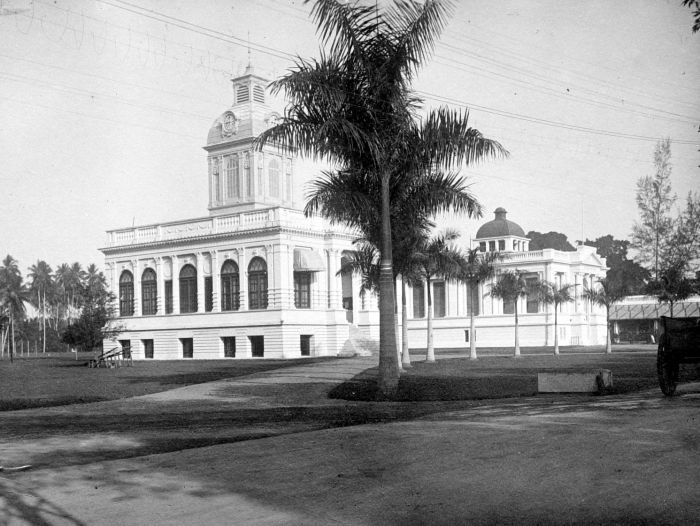
Town Hall and Bank Indonesia in Medan (formerly De Javasche Bank)

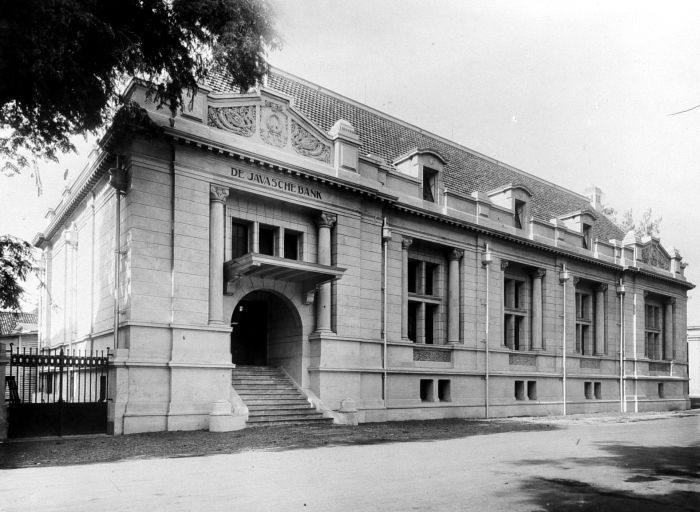
De Javasche Bank in Surabaya

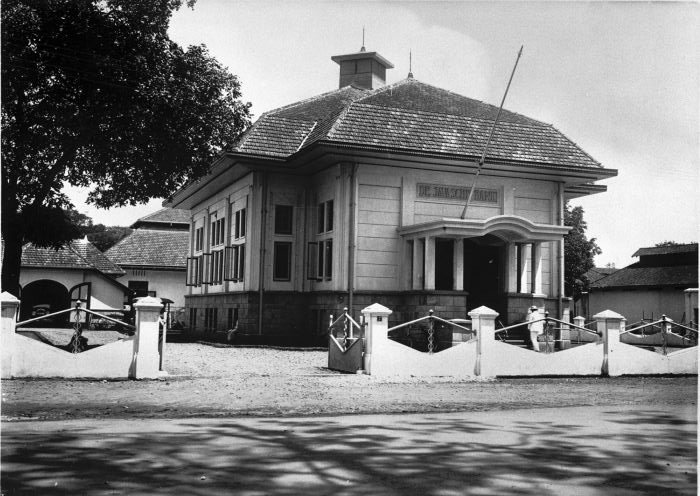
De Javasche Bank in Malang

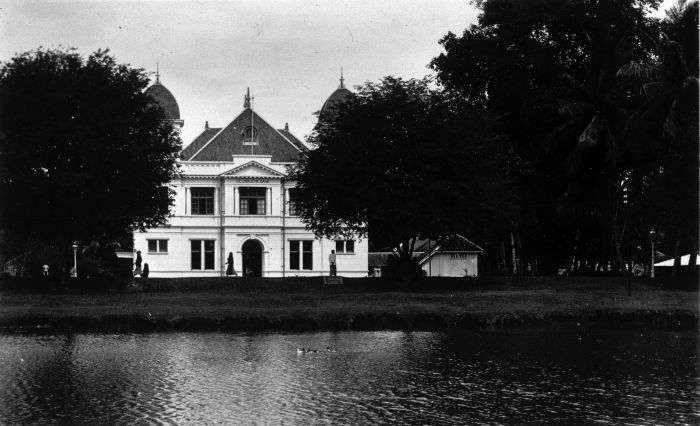
De Javasche Bank in Banda Aceh

=== Worldwide representative offices ===
- Singapore: 160 Robinson Road #28-05, SBF Center Singapore 068914.
- (United Kingdom) London: 10 City Road, London EC 1Y 2EH.
- Tokyo: New Kokusai Building Room 906 No.4 - 1, Marunouchi 3 - Chome Chiyoda-ku, Tokyo, 100-0005 Japan.
- (United States) New York: 200 Vesey Street 25th Floor New York 10285.
- (China) Beijing: Fortune Financial Center Building Lt. 46, 5 Dongsanhuan Road, Chaoyang District, Beijing 100020.

== List of Governors ==
No.	Portrait	Governor	Took office	Left office	Length of term	Term	Notes
1		Sjafruddin Prawiranegara	1 July 1953	20 January 1958	4 years, 203 days	1	
2		Lukman Hakim	9 April 1958	1 September 1959	1 year, 145 days	2	
3		Soetikno Slamet	1 September 1959	1 November 1960	1 year, 61 days	2	
4		Soemarno	1 November 1960	1 November 1963	3 years	2	
5		Teuku Jusuf Muda Dalam	10 December 1963	27 March 1966	2 years, 107 days	3	
6		Radius Prawiro	27 March 1966	27 March 1971	7 years, 9 days	3	
6		Radius Prawiro	27 March 1971	5 April 1973	7 years, 9 days	4	
7		Rachmat Saleh	5 April 1973	16 March 1978	9 years, 345 days	5	
7		Rachmat Saleh	16 March 1978	16 March 1983	9 years, 345 days	6	
8		Arifin Siregar	16 March 1983	27 March 1988	5 years, 11 days	7	
9		Adrianus Mooy	27 March 1988	March 1993	4 years, 339 days	8	
10		Sudrajad Djiwandono	March 1993	February 1998	4 years, 337 days	9	
11		Syahril Sabirin	February 1998	17 May 2003	5 years, 105 days	10	
12		Burhanuddin Abdullah	17 May 2003	17 May 2008	5 years	11	
13		Boediono	22 May 2008	17 May 2009	360 days	12	
—		Miranda Goeltom (Acting)	17 May 2009	27 July 2009	71 days	12	(Note: Implementation of the Governor's Duties) (Note: Concurrently serves as Senior Deputy Governor of Bank Indonesia)
—		Darmin Nasution	27 July 2009	1 September 2010	3 years, 300 days	12	
14		Darmin Nasution	1 September 2010	23 May 2013	3 years, 300 days	12	
15		Agus Martowardojo	23 May 2013	23 May 2018	5 years	13	
16		Perry Warjiyo	24 May 2018	24 May 2023	8 years, 64 days	14	
16		Perry Warjiyo	24 May 2023	27 July 2026	8 years, 64 days	15	
—		Destry Damayanti	27 July 2026	2 September 2026	114 days	15	
17		Destry Damayanti	2 September 2026	Incumbent	114 days	16	

== List of Senior Deputy Governors of Bank Indonesia ==
Governor Replacements (1953–1999)

Portrait	Name	Took office	Left office	Length of term	Notes
	Lukman Hakim	1953	1958	Approx. 5 years	Also served as a Director of Bank Indonesia.
	Indra Kasoema	15 June 1958	15 August 1960	2 years, 2 months	First Deputy Governor.
	Boerhanoeddin				Second Deputy Governor.
	Darmawan Mangunkusumo	31 July 1958			Second Deputy Governor; also served as a Director of Bank Indonesia.
	R. Soerjadi	13 September 1961	15 January 1965	3 years, 4 months, 2 days	
	Byanti Kharmawan				
	M. Djoeana Koesoemahardja	27 March 1966			
	R. Hertijanto	27 March 1966			
	Soehardi	27 March 1966			
	Rachmat Saleh	27 March 1966			

Senior Deputy Governors (1999–present)

No.	Portrait	Senior Deputy Governor	Took office	Left office	Length of term	Notes
1		Anwar Nasution	1999	July 2004	Approx. 5 years	
2		Miranda Goeltom	27 July 2004	27 July 2009	5 years	Appointed under Presidential Decree No. 98/M of 2004.
3		Darmin Nasution	27 July 2009	1 September 2010	1 year, 1 month, 5 days	
–	Vacant		1 September 2010	3 October 2013	3 years, 1 month, 2 days	
4		Mirza Adityaswara	3 October 2013	25 July 2014	5 years, 9 months, 22 days	Appointed under Presidential Decree No. 113/P of 2013.
4		Mirza Adityaswara	25 July 2014	25 July 2019	5 years, 9 months, 22 days	Reappointed under Presidential Decree No. 62/P of 2014.
5		Destry Damayanti	7 August 2019	7 August 2024	7 years, 0 months, 26 days	Appointed under Presidential Decree No. 74/P of 2019.
5		Destry Damayanti	7 August 2024	2 September 2026	7 years, 0 months, 26 days	Reappointed under Presidential Decree No. 74/P of 2024.
6		Aida S. Budiman	2 September 2026	Incumbent	Incumbent	Reappointed under Presidential Decree No. 92/P of 2026.

Legal basis

== Bibliography ==
- J. Soedradjad Djiwandono. 2005. Bank Indonesia and the Crisis: An Insider's View. Singapore: Institute of Southeast Asian Studies. ISBN 978-981-230-308-0
- Miranda S. Goeltom. 2008. Essays in Macroeconomic Policy: The Indonesian Experience. Jakarta: PT. Gramedia Pustaka Utama. ISBN 978-979-22-3339-1

== See also ==
- Economy of Indonesia
- Bank Indonesia Museum
- Indonesian rupiah
- List of banks in Indonesia
- Payment system
- List of financial supervisory authorities by country
- Netherlands Trading Company
- Nederlandsch-Indische Handelsbank
- Nederlandsch-Indische Escompto Maatschappij
