= Anggito Abimanyu =

Indonesian economist, academic, and bureaucrat (born 1963)

Chairman of the Indonesia Deposit Insurance Corporation
- Incumbent
- Assumed office 8 October 2025
- President: Prabowo Subianto
- Preceded by: Purbaya Sadewa; Didik Madiyono (Acting)

Deputy Minister of Finance of Indonesia
- In office October 21, 2024 – October 8, 2025 Serving with Suahasil Nazara & Thomas Djiwandono
- President: Prabowo Subianto
- Minister: Sri Mulyani (2024–2025); Purbaya Yudhi Sadewa (2025)
- Preceded by: Suahasil Nazara; Thomas Djiwandono
- Succeeded by: Suahasil Nazara; Juda Agung

Chairman of the Hajj Financial Management Agency
- In office 26 July 2017 – 20 October 2022
- President: Joko Widodo
- Preceded by: None; office established
- Succeeded by: Fadlul Imansyah

Chairman of PERBASI
- In office 14 December 2010 – 14 March 2015
- President: Susilo Bambang Yudhoyono; Joko Widodo
- Minister: Andi Alfian Mallarangeng; Roy Suryo; Imam Nahrawi
- Preceded by: Noviantika Nasution
- Succeeded by: Danny Kosasih

Director General of Hajj and Umrah Organization, Ministry of Religious Affairs
- In office 26 June 2012 – 30 May 2014
- President: Susilo Bambang Yudhoyono
- Minister: Suryadharma Ali
- Preceded by: Slamet Riyanto
- Succeeded by: Abdul Djamil

Head of the Fiscal Policy Agency
- In office 2006 – 21 May 2010; Acting: 2006 – 24 February 2010
- President: Susilo Bambang Yudhoyono
- Minister: Sri Mulyani

Personal details
- Born: Anggito Abimanyu; February 19, 1963 (age 63) Bogor, West Java
- Spouse: Edharma Yati Latief
- Children: 2
- Education: Gadjah Mada University; University of Pennsylvania
- Occupation: Economist; Academic; Bureaucrat

Anggito Abimanyu (born 19 February 1963) is an Indonesian economist, academic and government official who has served as chairman of the Indonesia Deposit Insurance Corporation since October 2025. He previously served as deputy minister of finance, head of the Fiscal Policy Agency and director general of hajj and umrah at the Ministry of Religious Affairs. He is also a professor at Gadjah Mada University.

== Early life and education ==
Anggito Abimanyu was born in Bogor, West Java, on February 19, 1963. He earned a Bachelor of Economics (S.E.) degree from the Faculty of Economics and Business (FEB) of Gadjah Mada University in 1985.

He continued his education at the University of Pennsylvania, Philadelphia, Pennsylvania, United States, and earned a Master of Science (M.Sc.) in 1990 and a Doctor of Philosophy (Ph.D.) in Economics in 1994.

== Carrier ==
=== Academic Field ===
Anggito began his academic career as a lecturer at the Faculty of Economics and Business, Gadjah Mada University (UGM) in 1988. He served as a Research Fellow at the World Bank in Washington, D.C. (1992–1994). After returning to UGM, he was appointed Professor of Economics in the Department of Economics and Business, UGM Vocational School, in 2025. He also served as Head of the Department of Economics and Business, UGM Vocational School.

=== Bureaucracy and Professional Affairs ===
Anggito was a Member of the National Economic Council (DEN) in the 1999–2000 period and Expert Staff to the Minister of Finance of the Republic of Indonesia from 1999 to 2003. He then served as Head of the Fiscal Policy Agency (BKF) of the Ministry of Finance of the Republic of Indonesia from 2003 to 2010. During this period, he was appointed as Deputy Minister of Finance in 2010, but the inauguration was cancelled. He then announced his resignation as Head of BKF on May 20, 2010.

His career continued as Director General of Hajj and Umrah Organization Ministry of Religious Affairs of the Republic of Indonesia (2012–2014) and Head of the Implementing Agency Hajj Financial Management Agency (BPKH) (2017–2022). In the banking sector, he served as Commissioner of Bank Lippo (2003–2008), Chief Economist BRI, and Commissioner of BRI Syariah (2014–2017). He also served as Chief Economist CNBC Indonesia.

On October 21, 2024, he was appointed as Deputy Minister of Finance of the Republic of Indonesia. Then, in September 2025, he was elected by Commission XI of the House of Representatives of the Republic of Indonesia as Chairman of the Board of Commissioners of the Deposit Insurance Corporation (LPS) for the 2025–2030 period.

== Controversy ==
=== Allegations of Plagiarism ===
In February 2014, Anggito Abimanyu faced allegations of plagiarism related to his opinion piece in the Kompas Daily on February 10, 2014, "The Idea of Disaster Insurance." The opinion piece was accused of having similarities to a 2006 article published by Hotbonar Sinaga and Munawar Kasman.

Following the case, Anggito submitted his resignation as a lecturer at the Faculty of Economics and Business, Gadjah Mada University (UGM), on February 17, 2014, which was subsequently approved by the university. In a press conference, Anggito stated that there had been a misquote of references.

=== Hajj Fund Case ===
In May 2014, Anggito resigned from his position as Director General of Hajj and Umrah Pilgrimage Organization. The resignation was attributed to his desire to focus on the alleged corruption case involving the management of Hajj funds, in which he was being questioned as a witness by the Corruption Eradication Commission (KPK).

== Bibliography ==
=== Books ===
- Abimanyu, A. (2023). Pelita Hati: Untaian Syair Cinta Tanpa Syarat. Jakarta: Republika Penerbit.
- Abimanyu, A. (2014). Tangan Tak Terlihat: Haji, Membangun Manusia Unggul. Bandung: Mizan Media Utama.
- Abimanyu, A. (2011). Refleksi dan Gagasan Kebijakan Fiskal. Jakarta: Gramedia Pustaka Utama.
- Abimanyu, A., & Imansyah, M. H. (2008). Sistem Pendeteksian Dini Krisis Keuangan di Indonesia: Penerapan Berbagai Model Ekonomi. Yogyakarta: BPFE Yogyakarta.
- Abimanyu, A. (2000). Ekonomi Indonesia Baru: Kajian dan Alternatif Solusi Menuju Pemulihan. Jakarta: PT Elex Media Komputindo.
- Abimanyu, A. (1988). Minyak Bumi dan Bantuan Luar Negeri Dalam Perekonomian Indonesia. Yogyakarta: STIE YKPN.

== Discography ==
=== Single ===
Title	Year	Album	Notes	References
“Hadiahkan NirwanaMu”	2020	Singel non-album	feat. Snada	
“Menjemput Hidayah-Mu”	2023	Singel non-album		
“Demi Fajar”	2023	Singel non-album	feat. Lucky Octavian	
“Golden Indonesia”	2023	Singel non-album		
“Perjalanan Cinta”	2025	Singel non-album		

== Personal life and other interests ==
Anggito Abimanyu is married to Edharma Yati Latief and has two children: his son, Mahditya Putra Mahardhika, and his daughter, Nadia Rachma.

In addition to his career in economics and bureaucracy, he is also interested in sports and music. He served as Chairman of the Indonesian Basketball Association (Perbasi) from 2010 to 2014. Anggito is also known for his skillful saxophone playing and has held several solo concerts featuring his own songs. One of his songs, "From Asia to the World," was once the theme song for the Asian Development Bank (ADB).

In 2010, he became a commercial star and brand ambassador for the herbal medicine product Tolak Angin from PT Sido Muncul.

== See also ==
- Deposit Insurance Corporation
- Purbaya Yudhi Sadewa
- Ministry of Finance of the Republic of Indonesia
