= Nazara =

Nazara is a surname. Notable people with the surname include:

- Hanati Nazara
- Suahasil Nazara (born 1970), Indonesian economist and academic

== Other ==
- Nazara Technologies, Indian video game development company
