= 17+8 Demands =

2025 Indonesian political demands

17+8 Demands from the People
- Part of the August 2025 Indonesian protests
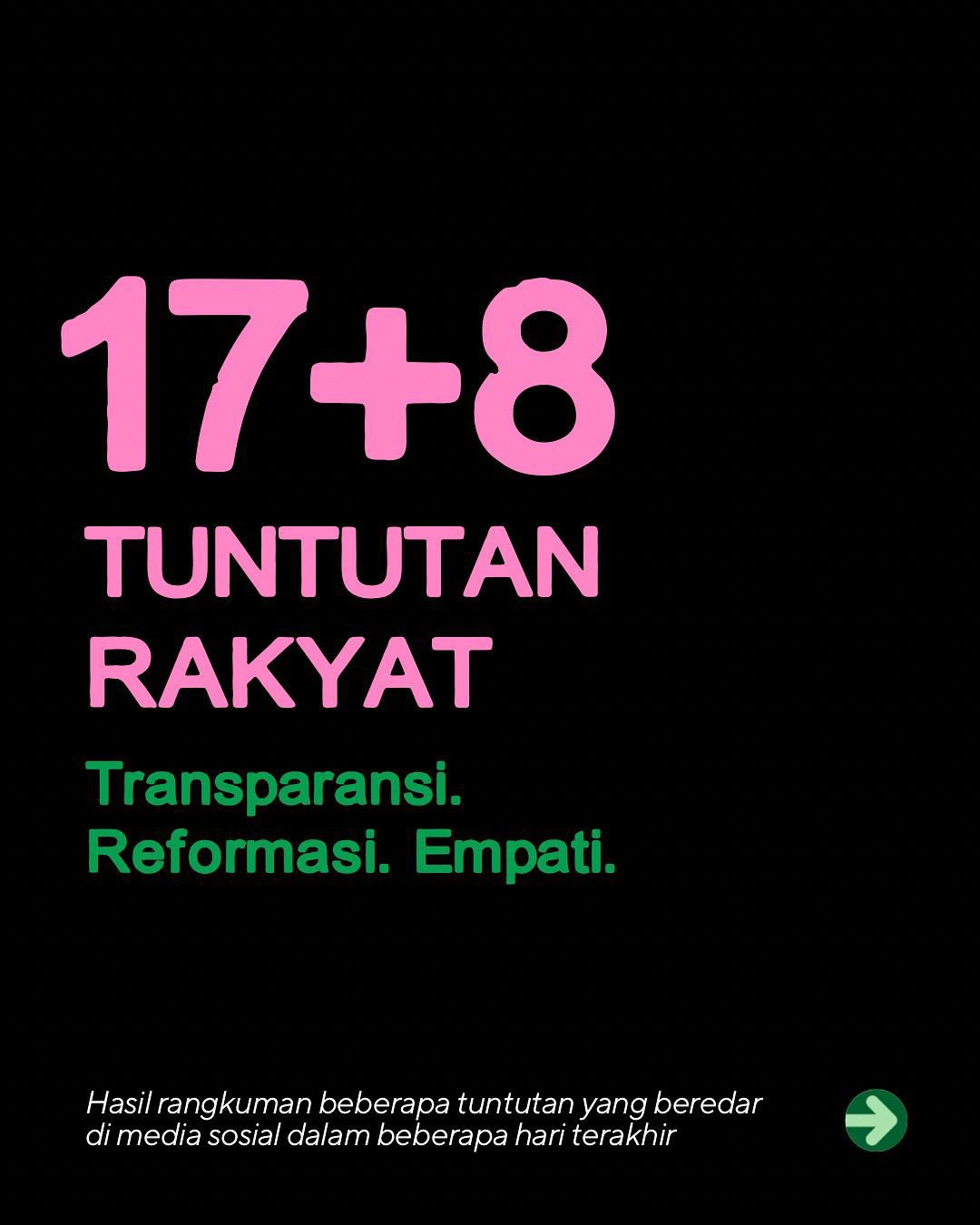
- Official logo
- Native name: 17+8 Tuntutan Rakyat
- Date: 25 August 2025 – present
- Location: Indonesia
- Theme: Hero Green Brave Pink Resistance Blue
- Cause: Rising living costs, low wages, tax increase, corruption, gender inequality, parliamentary pay raises, police violence and impunity, human rights violation, military encroachment of civilian government, and public distrust in institutions
- Motive: To unify public grievances into 17 immediate and 8 long-term reform demands
- Organized by: Indonesian pro-democracy activists, student groups, labor unions, and social media influencers.
- Outcome: 25 total demands (17 short-term, 8 long-term) formally presented to the government
- Website: Indonesian ver.; English ver.

17+8 Demands (Indonesian: 17+8 Tuntutan Rakyat, lit. '17+8 Demands from the People', abbreviated 17+8) is a political slogan and protest platform formulated by Indonesian pro-democracy activists during the nationwide August 2025 protests. The demands consist of a set of seventeen short-term measures to be implemented within one week, and eight long-term reforms to be achieved within one year. The campaign emerged as a unifying framework for grievances voiced during protests against parliamentary pay raises, rising living costs, police brutality, and public distrust in political institutions.

== History ==
In late August 2025 Indonesia saw widespread protests (centered on Jakarta and other cities) against issues like a proposed pay raise for legislators, rising living costs and mass layoffs, and heavy-handed police action. The first wave of nationwide protests on 25 August 2025 began chiefly as a demonstration against the perceived "fantastic" perks of Indonesian parliamentarians. Though this effort had no set-in-stone demands, the protesters' demands varied in extremity.

In Jakarta thousands of students, workers and activists massed at the MPR/DPR complex demanding an end to exorbitant lawmaker pay and allowances. The immediate, high-profile demand was the cancellation of a new Rp 50 million (US$3,000) monthly housing allowance for each MP. Protestors also demanded the removal of policies that benefit conglomerates and the military. Protesters also called for full transparency of MPs’ salaries and budgets, and the reversal of any planned pay raises. Some of the demands conveyed included asking for the parliament to be dissolved, asking for the arrest of Minister of Culture Fadli Zon in connection with his denial of the 1998 mass rape tragedy. A student press statement (from the group Aliansi Rakyat Bergerak) explicitly linked these grievances to nine core demands, including scrapping the housing allowance program, enacting a pending Asset Confiscation law, and halting a government historical revisionism project heeded by Fadli Zon. Some fringe demands were also popular in social media, which focus on the complete dissolution of the Red and White Cabinet, the dissolution of the DPR through special presidential decree, the Resignation of Prabowo Subianto as president, the indictment of Gibran Rakabuming Raka as Vice President, and the investigation of the Jokowi family for any suspected corruption.

The idea for the complete disbandment of the DPR was highly popular among netizens and protestors. However, the idea for complete disbandment cast some with doubt. A commentary on Trias Politica observed that calls to dissolve the DPR, though radical as symbols of discontent, could lead to dangerous institutional consequences. If such a dissolution were acted upon, it could halt legislative functions, disrupt governance, and undermine budget processes, potentially destabilizing the broader democratic system of Indonesia. A BeritaSatu article noted that such a move is virtually impossible under the current constitutional framework. Remarking on the impossibility, Ahmad Sahroni publicly called those demanding dissolution as "the world’s biggest fools" and referred to them as rebellious youths who "should go to jail". This stance sparked deep public anger and led to the sacking of his house and career. Following the death of an ojek (motorbike taxi) driver, Affan Kurniawan, under a police tactical vehicle, student-led protesters expanded their demands to include a complete and thorough reform of the Indonesian National Police and either the resignation or termination of the chief of police, Listyo Sigit Prabowo.

=== Formulation ===
On 1 September, in an attempt to create a unified and cohesive demand amidst continuing protests, a number of social media personalities published the 17+8 demands (named in tribute to Indonesian independence day, 17 August), which listed 25 demands that were directed at various government institutions. The demands were a summary of 211 different demands from civil organizations as well as statements from other academic and labor unions, and was compiled by social media influencers Salsa Erwina Hutagalung, Fathia Izzati, Abigail Limuria, Andovi da Lopez, Andhyta Firselly Utami, and Jerome Polin. By 7 September, following criticisms that the demands lacked consultation with wider civil society, several activists and academics shared on their social media platforms that the 17+8 demands were compiled in consultation with limited individuals and organizations due to the complex circumstances leading up to it.

By 4 September, the proponents of the 17+8 demands held protests in front of the MPR/DPR Building, reading the full demands and issued an ultimatum to fulfill them. However, at the sametime, a demonstration mass from the All-Indonesian Student Executive Body (BEM SI) conveyed 13 different demands. Meanwhile, another large mass of protesters from Alliance of Labor Movements Together with the People (GEBRAK); a temporary alliance of many labor movements in Jakarta, also held a mass protest in the area of the Arjuna Wijaya Statue, Central Jakarta voicing their 5 key demands.

== Symbol ==
The movement’s demands were symbolized through three colors that became its visual identity:

- Resistance Blue

Drawn from the dominant color of the Emergency Warning image, which has served as a resistance icon since the 2024 Indonesian local election law protests.

- Brave Pink

Inspired by the pink hijab worn by a mother participating in the August 28 protest in Jakarta. The color also conveys the values of gentleness and feminism represented by women and mothers.

- Hero Green

Taken from the signature green of Indonesia’s online motorcycle taxi drivers’ uniforms, as a tribute to Affan Kurniawan and Rusdamdiansyah.

Across social media, many users adopted profile pictures featuring a blend of Brave Pink and Hero Green, a trend popularly referred to as Brave Pink Hero Green.

== Demands ==
The 25 demands were divided into 17 short-term demands subject to be fulfilled by 5 September 2025 and eight long-term demands subject to be fulfilled on 31 August 2026. The short-term goals demands immediate action from the President, House of Representatives, political parties, police, armed forces, and economic ministries, including withdrawing the military from civilian roles, repealing of the Armed Forces Act 2025 revision (the enactment of which triggered a wave of protests in March 2025), releasing detained protesters, suspending House of Representatives benefits, and ensuring fair labor conditions. The long-term demands focused on broader structural reforms, such as auditing and reforming the House of Representatives, revising tax and anti-corruption laws, decentralizing police functions, removing the military from civil functions, and strengthening human rights institutions. The points of 17+8 demand includes:

=== Short-term demands ===
- To the President:
  - Pull the Armed Forces out of the civil law enforcement and ensure no criminalization of protesters
  - Create an independent investigation commission on the cases of Affan Kurniawan, Umar Amarudin, and other victims of police brutality during the 28-30 August protest with clear mandate and transparency
- To the People's Representative Council
  - Freeze the pay raise and perks to the representatives and cancelation of new facilities (including pensions)
  - Transparency of publication of funds
  - Demand the Honorary Body of the People's Representatives Council to probe into scandalous representatives
- To the Chairperson of Political Parties
  - Sacking and sanction to unethical cadres in the People's Representatives Council that were responsible for the unrest
  - Announce the commitment of political parties to side with the people during crisis
  - Involve every cadres for public dialogue with students and civil organizations
- To the Police Forces
  - Free all detained protesters
  - End to police brutality and adherence to standard operating procedure on demonstration
  - Arrest and bring all officers and commanders who were involved in human rights violations to justice
- To the Armed Forces
  - Return to barracks and cease the involvement in civil law enforcement
  - Uphold internal discipline to prevent armed forces meddling with police affairs
  - Public commitment of armed forces not to enter civilian space during democratic crises
- To the Ministers in the economic sector
  - Ensure reasonable wages to every workforces nationwide
  - Take emergency measures to prevent mass layoffs and protect every contract laborers
  - Open dialogue with labor unions

=== Long-term demands ===
- Total cleansing and reform to the People's Representatives Council
  - Conduct independent audits and have the results publicized to the people. Increase the standards of preconditions to qualify as a member of parliament (i.e. no prior corruption cases) and standardize a KPI for evaluating every member. Remove any special privileges: Life pensions, special transportation and escorts, and taxes covered by the State Budget.
- Political parties reform and strengthen the executive watch
  - Political parties must publish their first financial statements within this year, and DPR must ensure that the Opposition must function as it was supposed to.
- Draft fairer tax reform plan
  - Reconsider the balance of transferring the State Budget from the central government to local governments. Repeal plans to increase taxes that may burden the people and draft a plan for a fairer tax reform.
- Pass and uphold the Asset Seizure Draft Bill
  - House of Representatives must pass the Asset Seizure Draft Bill within this year to demonstrate serious commitments to fight corruption in conjunction with strengthening the Corruption Eradication Commission and the Corruption Eradication Act
- Leadership and systemic reform to the police forces to achieve more professional and humanist policing
  - DPR must reform the Police Act. The police must decentralize their functions: public enforcement, security, traffic control within 12 months for starters.
- Return the armed forces to the barracks without exception
  - The government must revoke the mandate bestowed to the Indonesian National Armed Forces in civilian projects such as in large scale farming (food estate) within this year, and DPR must start to revise the Armed Forces Act
- Strengthen the National Commission on Human Rights and independent watchdogs
  - DPR must revise the National Commission of Human Rights Act to broaden their responsibilities on freedom of speech. President must empower Ombudsman and Kompolnas
- Review policies from the economic and labor sectors
  - Seriously review national strategic projects (PSN) and economic priorities by protecting the rights of indigenous people and the environment. Reevaluate the Omnibus Law on Job Creation that burdens the people especially workers, and audit the governance of Danantara and state owned enterprises.

== Result ==
No	Demand	Result	Ref.
1	Pull the Armed Forces out of the civil law enforcement and ensure no criminalization of protesters	Head of Armed Forces Information Headquarters Freddy Ardianzah states that the presence of the Indonesian National Armed Forces (TNI) is a support per request by the Indonesian National Police (Polri) for national security and not to take over Polri's duties. He emphasized that the TNI was working according to regulations, coordinating with relevant parties, and would gradually withdraw to their barracks once the situation returned to normal.	
2	Create an independent investigation commission on the cases of Affan Kurniawan, Umar Amarudin, and other victims of police brutality during the 28-30 August protest with clear mandate and transparency	No action yet to be made	
3	Freeze the pay raise and perks to the representatives and cancelation of new facilities (including pensions)	August 31, 2025 – Prabowo and various political parties agreed to eliminate the House of Representatives (DPR) allowance and a moratorium on working visits.; September 5, 2025 – The salary, which initially drew criticism at Rp 104 million per month, has now been reduced to Rp 65.5 million. This decision was agreed upon by the eight faction heads at a DPR leadership consultation meeting on September 4, 2025.	
4	Transparency of publication of funds	House of Representatives has released the full details of the take home pay received by members of parliament	
5	Demand the Honorary Body of the People's Representatives Council to probe into scandalous representatives	The House of Representatives leadership has asked the Council's Ethics Council to investigate legislative members who were suspended by the party because their statements were deemed offensive to the public.	
6	Sacking and sanction to unethical cadres in the People's Representatives Council that were responsible for the unrest	5 members of parliament suspended (Note: Ahmad Sahroni, Nafa Urbach, Eko Patrio, Uya Kuya and Adies Kadir had their memberships suspended by Golkar, NasDem, and PAN)	
7	Announce the commitment of political parties to side with the people during crisis	Perindo Party, Prosperous Justice Party, National Awakening Party, Crescent Star Party, National Mandate Party and Democratic Party had made their commitments.	
8	Involve every cadres for public dialogue with students and civil organizations	Perindo, PKS, PKB, PAN, and Demokrat announced that they will involve their cadres in public discussions. President Prabowo Subianto requested that the House of Representatives to open public dialogues with the people.	
9	Free all detained protesters	Polri released 1.419 detainees (Note: Central Java Regional Police release 45 demonstrators, Metro Jaya Regional Police send 1113 demonstrators home, Bali Regional Police release 160 demonstrators, Temanggung Police release 98 demonstrators, Yogyakarta Regional Police release 8 demonstrators as requested by Yogyakarta Governor Hamengkubuwono X)	
10	End to police brutality and adherence to standard operating procedure on demonstration	No action yet to be made	
11	Arrest and bring all officers and commanders who were involved in human rights violations to justice	No action yet to be made	
12	Return to barracks and cease the involvement in civil law enforcement	No action yet to be made	
13	Uphold internal discipline to prevent armed forces meddling with police affairs	No action yet to be made	
14	Public commitment of armed forces not to enter civilian space during democratic crises	Deputy Indonesian National Armed Forces (TNI) Commander General Tandyo Budi Revita dismissed suggestions that his military would take over security or declare martial law following the demonstrations that erupted over the past few days. TNI Information Center Chief Freddy Ardianzah stated that they would be gradually withdrawn to their barracks once the situation returns to normal.	
15	Ensure reasonable wages to every workforces nationwide	Thousands of workers demonstrated at the Indonesian House of Representatives (DPR/MPR) building, demanding a 10% increase in the 2026 minimum wage, the elimination of outsourcing, and the establishment of a Layoff Task Force. Minister of Manpower Yassierli responded that the minimum wage is determined in accordance with the National Tripartite Workforce Forum (LKS Tripnas) mechanism.	
16	Take emergency measures to prevent mass layoffs and protect every contract laborers	President Prabowo Subianto announced the formation of the National Labor Welfare Council (DKBN) after meeting with several labor union organizations at the Palace on September 1. According to KSPSI President Andi Gani Nena Wea, the DKBN will form a Layoff Prevention Task Force.	
17	Open dialogue with labor unions	Prabowo invited the leaders of the trade union confederation to the State Palace.	
17+1	Total cleansing and reform to the People's Representatives Council	The House of Representatives (DPR) leadership stated its readiness to follow up on the demands of the 17+8 Movement, including institutional reform, at a meeting in Senayan on September 3, 2025. Meanwhile, the Indonesian Parliamentary Center (IPC) urged the DPR to form an independent team to evaluate the salary and allowance standards for council members. The Constitutional Court (MK) was asked to make a bachelor's degree the minimum education requirement for presidential and legislative candidates, including district heads. Speaker Puan Maharani will directly lead DPR reforms to meet the people's demands.	
17+2	Political parties reform and strengthen the executive watch	No action yet to be made	
17+3	Draft fairer tax reform plan	Prabowo met with labor unions on September 1, 2025, to discuss the Employment Bill, the Asset Confiscation Bill, and tax reform. The following day, Sri Mulyani confirmed there would be no increases nor new taxes in 2026, despite the 9.8 percent increase in the draft state budget revenue target to Rp 3,147.7 trillion (Rp 3.15 quadrillion).	
17+4	Pass and uphold the Asset Seizure Draft Bill	Prabowo had requested all parties to push for the passing of the Asset Seizure Act	
17+5	Leadership and systemic reform to the police forces to achieve more professional and humanist policing	No action yet to be made	
17+6	Return the armed forces to the barracks without exception	No action yet to be made	
17+7	Strengthen the National Commission on Human Rights and independent watchdogs	No action yet to be made	
17+8	Review policies from the economic and labor sectors	No action yet to be made	

== Reaction ==
=== Central government ===
President Prabowo Subianto reacted to the whole list, stating that some of the demands made sense while other demands are still normative and can be argued with. He hopes to have a good discussion on some of the "normative" demands in order to execute the best appropriate action. Prior to the president's comment, his special advisor Wiranto on September 4 said that Prabowo can fulfill most of the demands, but not all as Wiranto commented that it will be "troublesome" to fulfill it all at once.

Newly appointed Minister of Finance Purbaya Yudhi Sadewa responded to the 17+8 demands after his swearing in, stating that the 17+8 demands are made from a minority of people that had not enough in their lives and states that the only solution is to create a more rapid economic growth..

=== House of Representatives ===
The leadership of the House of Representatives (DPR) answered the 17+8 demands by enacting several policies, which are cancelling the allowance of housing for members and foreign working visit moratoriums except for official businesses, evaluating other allowances, ending the pay for non-active members, coordinating with the respective parties on their suspended members and to strengthen transparency.

== See also ==
- Five Demands, Not One Less — Protest goals set by pro-democracy activists in Hong Kong
