= Purbaya Yudhi Sadewa =

Indonesian economist and engineer (born 1964)

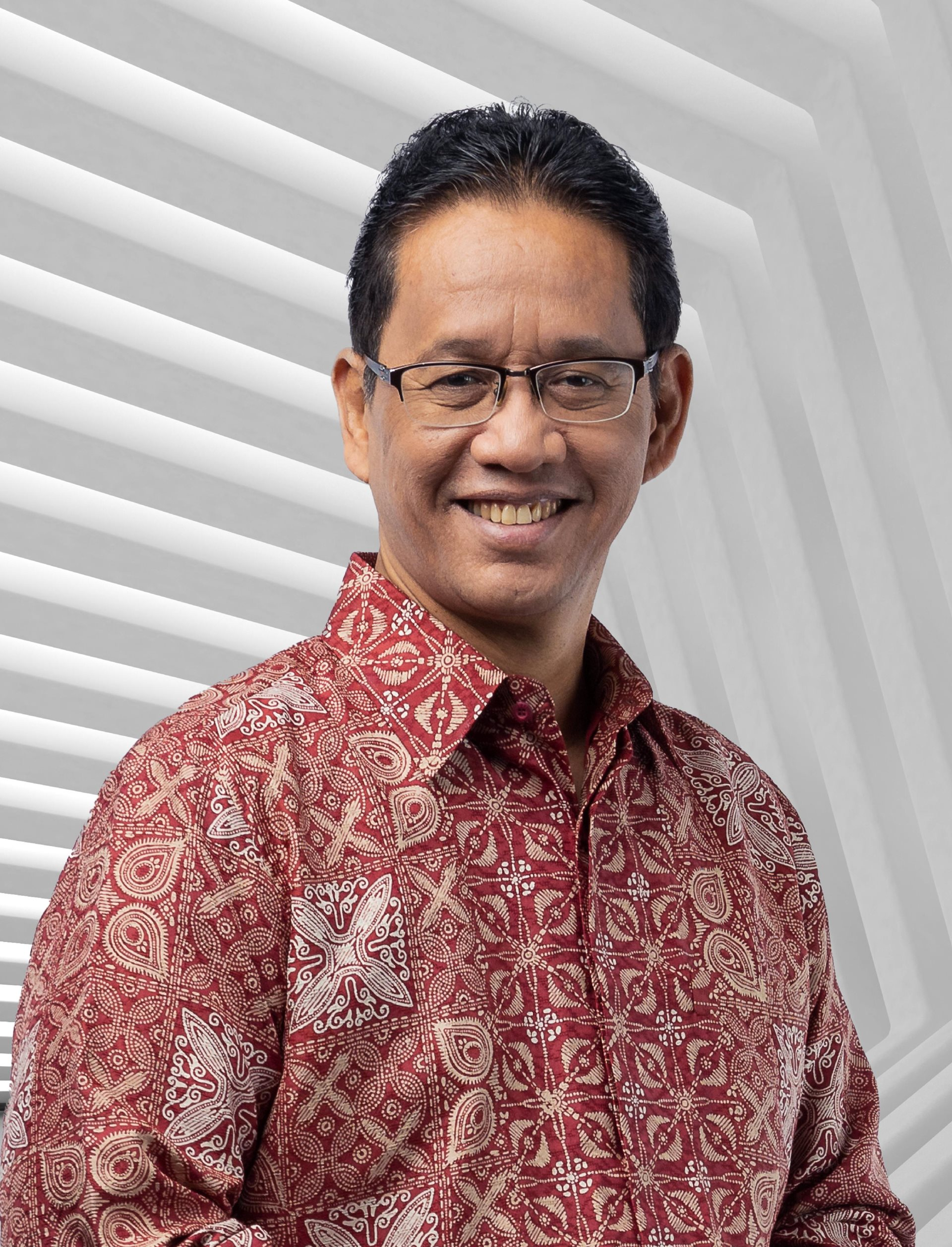
- Official portrait, 2025

Minister of Finance
- In office 8 September 2025 – 14 September 2026
- President: Prabowo Subianto
- Deputy: Suahasil Nazara; Juda Agung
- Preceded by: Sri Mulyani
- Succeeded by: Suahasil Nazara

Head of the Indonesia Deposit Insurance Corporation
- In office 3 September 2020 – 8 September 2025
- President: Joko Widodo; Prabowo Subianto
- Preceded by: Halim Alamsyah
- Succeeded by: Didik Madiyono (acting); Anggito Abimanyu

Personal details
- Born: 7 July 1964 (age 62) Bogor, West Java, Indonesia
- Party: Independent
- Spouse: Ida Yulidina
- Children: 2
- Education: Bandung Institute of Technology (Ir.); Purdue University (MS, PhD)
- Profession: Economist; engineer
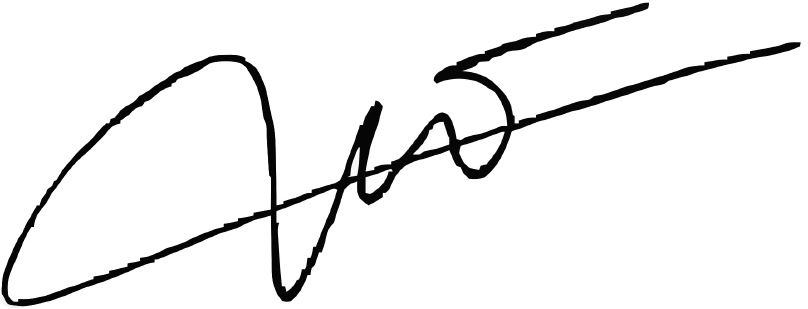
- Signature

Purbaya Yudhi Sadewa (born 7 July 1964) is an Indonesian economist and engineer who served as minister of finance from 2025 to 2026 under President Prabowo Subianto. He previously served as head of the Indonesia Deposit Insurance Corporation from 2020 to 2025.

== Biography ==
=== Early life and education ===
Purbaya Yudhi Sadewa was born in Bogor, West Java, on 7 July 1964.

He did his undergraduate study at the Bandung Institute of Technology, where he majored in Electrical Engineering. After completing his study, Purbaya shifted his academic focus toward economics for graduate education.

He then pursued graduate studies in the United States, attending Purdue University in Indiana, where he earned a PhD in Economics.

=== Personal life ===
Purbaya Yudhi Sadewa in 2023

Purbaya's wife, Ida Yulidina, won Wajah Femina, an Indonesian modelling/beauty contest in 1989. She earned a law degree from Universitas Padjadjaran, Bandung.

Purbaya and Ida have two sons: Yuda Purboyo Sunu and Yudo Achilles Sadewa. Yudo Achilles Sadewa, born in 2006, is known as a trader and a content creator. He attended high school at SMA Al-Izhar Pondok Labu. Purbaya once dubbed Yudo "the trader kid" ("si bocah trader") in a social media post in 2023.

== Career ==
=== Professional career ===
Prior to entering government service, Purbaya worked as a Wireline field engineer at Schlumberger Overseas SA from 1989 to 1994. Later, from October 2000 to July 2005, he served as Senior Economist at Danareksa Research Institute. In April 2006 he took on the role of President Director of PT Danareksa Securities, a post he held until October 2008. Alongside that, from July 2005 to March 2013, he occupied the position of Chief Economist at Danareksa Research Institute. Following that period, he was appointed as a Member of the Board of Directors of PT Danareksa (Persero), serving from March 2013 through April 2015.

=== Career in government ===
In March 2015, Purbaya was appointed as Deputy III for Strategic Issues Management in the Presidential Staff Office of the Republic of Indonesia by Chief of Presidential Staff Luhut Binsar Pandjaitan. He held that post until September 2015. Later in November 2015, he was appointed as Special Staff for Economic Affairs to the Coordinating Minister for Political, Legal and Security Affairs, a position he held until July 2016.

In 2016, Purbaya returned to the Coordinating Ministry for Economic Affairs, where he was appointed Deputy Chair of the Task Force for Handling and Resolving Cases (Debottlenecking), better known as “Pokja IV” (June 2016 – 2020). Later, he was transferred to the Coordinating Ministry for Maritime Affairs as Special Staff for Economic Affairs (July 2016–May 2018). He was then promoted to Deputy for Coordination of Maritime Sovereignty and Energy at the Coordinating Ministry for Maritime Affairs and Investment, a role he held from May 2018 to June 2020. In June 2020, he shifted roles within that same coordinating ministry.

Purbaya was sworn in as Chair of the Board of Commissioners of the Indonesia Deposit Insurance Corporation (LPS) for the 2020-2025 term on 23 September 2020. He was later appointed Minister of Finance of the Republic of Indonesia to replace Sri Mulyani Indrawati on 8 September 2025.

== Minister of Finance ==
=== Appointment ===
Purbaya was sworn in as the new Minister of Finance replacing Sri Mulyani on 8 September 2025. The announcement was made by Minister of the State Secretariat Prasetyo Hadi. Purbaya said that he was surprised with the sudden appointment and for a brief moment he thought he was being ‘pranked’. His appointment was praised by former president Joko Widodo, who knows him personally and said that Purbaya came from a different school of economic thought from Sri Mulyani.

Right after his appointment, Purbaya made a statement about the 17+8 Demands which generated controversy. Achmad Nur Hidayat, an economist and public policy expert from UPN Veteran Jakarta criticize Purbaya's attitude of being too overconfident and underestimating the people's demand. Hidayat states that his statement is a dangerous signal to market stability and oversimplifying a complex problem. His statement on the protests was even condemned by the public and University of Indonesia Student Executive Board demanded for his removal from office.

In an economic perspective, IDX Composite dropped by 1,28% when Purbaya was announced to be the minister replacing Sri Mulyani amidst of riots and other major cabinet reshuffles. Analysts projected that market participants would adopt a wait-and-see attitude toward the policies Purbaya would implement. Uncertainty resulting from the change in officials and the controversial statements had the potential to cause a short-term weakening of the Composite Stock Price Index (IHSG). Purbaya reacted to the sudden drop, stating he has been in the financial industry for more than 15 years and the drop is caused by an economic slowdown. He then promised to fix the economy.

=== Tenure ===
Purbaya then had a plenary meeting with the Eleventh Commission of the House of Representatives of Indonesia on 10 September 2025 to discuss about the state budget and his ministerial programs. In his plenary meeting, Purbaya opened his remarks by comparing the meeting atmosphere to the previous meetings as the Head of the Indonesia Deposit Insurance Corporation (LPS) where he was able to talk "like a cowboy" compared to being a Finance Minister as he had to refine his way to explain to the member's laughter. One member quipped that he may be a cowboy as long as he's able to get things done. Purbaya handled questions and criticism from members regarding on the state budget and his overconfidence of reaching a 6-7% GDP growth, even regarding to non-taxation revenue, only to then rebuke members that "You have meetings with the finance minister (Mulyani) for few hundred days in a year, why haven't you asked that? And when I came here, all the sudden, wow, everything became very long". When asked by PDI-P about paying the national debt of IDR 1,300 trillion, Purbaya confidently answered that "Even 3,000 trillion rupiah can be embezzled, but how can it not be used to pay off a debt of 1,300 trillion rupiah?".

Purbaya then announced in the meeting that he will stimulate the economy by redistributing IDR 200 trillion from Bank Indonesia to banks under Prabowo's approval. He then announced on 12 September that five state owned banks will receive the funding, which are Bank Mandiri, Bank Negara Indonesia, Bank Rakyat Indonesia, Bank Tabungan Negara and Bank Syariah Indonesia. As a result, the IDX Composite reacted positively as stock prices went up driven by stock rallies from the finance sectors. Despite this, his policy was criticized by Darmadi Durianto who warned that inflation would rise and devaluate the Rupiah if the liquidity was not quickly absorbed.

On 19 September, Purbaya conducted a surprise inspection by calling the customer service of Directorate General of Taxes regarding on the implementation of CoreTax tax reporting system. Disguising himself as an ordinary taxpayer and pretending to not knowing about the system itself, Purbaya felt cheated by the call and felt that the staff lied about the system's implementation just to satisfy him. Purbaya also admitted that he only receive the reports of the implementation and intends to oversee the implementation of the system itself while telling his staff to avoid the working culture of Asal Bapak Senang (Indonesian: As long as you're happy) in bureaucracy.

On 2 October 2025, Purbaya announced that he will cut transfer funds to local governments on 2026 because of alleged funds misallocation and mismanagement. As he was discussing the state budget together with the House of Representatives, Purbaya announce that he will cut the transfer to IDR 650 trillion which was later revised to IDR 693 trillion and states that even if the transfer was decreased, the presence of government policies will increase. This move was protested by 18 governors including Muzakir Manaf, Sherly Tjoanda and Bobby Nasution. However Governor of Jakarta Pramono Anung states that he didn't mind the transfer to his province was cut while Purbaya joked that allocations to Jakarta could be cut even further. Purbaya responded to the 18 governors by asking them to optimize spending to ensure that the transfer of funds from the central government can bring real impact towards the prosperity and development of their respective region.

Purbaya also threatened to pull funding from the free nutritious meal program if he found the funds are not optimally used through an evaluation conducted until the end of October 2025. He states that the unused funds will be reallocated to other programs. This however got condemned by his mentor, Luhut Binsar Pandjaitan who claimed that funds used for the free nutritious meal program were steadily absorbed, but Purbaya states that he will still pull out the funds based on the evaluation.

== Economic philosophy ==
Purbaya is recognized as a key figure of Indonesia’s fiscal transformation and contemporary economic thought, whose intellectual contributions have effected a departure from the longstanding principles governing the country’s fiscal policies. He has argued that Indonesia’s success should not be measured solely by adherence to international standards, but by its ability to translate public spending into concrete national development outcomes. Based on Purbaya's policy, the objective of fiscal management extends beyond balancing the budget, encompassing the careful alignment of domestic priorities with external pressures, and the reconciliation of short-term fiscal discipline with long-term developmental goals. Purbaya's economic philosophy is generally regarded as populist orientation and believed that the state must intervene in protecting domestic interests, unlike the much more orthodox market approach from his predecessor.

Purbaya's public esteem stems from his unwavering commitment to honesty and transparency in addressing societal challenges. For instance, in response to a prospective Tax Amnesty policy, originally implemented during Sri Mulyani's tenure, he stated his opposition, arguing that the measure could create avenues for potential violators to misreport their tax returns. Although he acknowledged that he was not fully familiar with the policy’s details, Purbaya expressed his views as an economist, perceiving the policy as inappropriate. One of his flagship initiatives involved the placement of IDR 200 trillion in idle government funds from Bank Indonesia into five state-owned banks (Himpunan Bank Milik Negara / Himbara) to encourage lending. As of 30 September 2025, about IDR 112.4 trillion had been disbursed as productive credit. Purbaya reported that fund absorption rates reached 74 percent at Bank Mandiri, 62 percent at BRI, 50 percent at BNI, 90 percent at BTN, and 55 percent at BSI.

== Controversy ==
Not long a day after his appointment, Sadewa generated a lot of public controversy through his comments, his background, and his son's reaction of his appointment.

=== Comments on 17+8 demands ===
On his inauguration day, Purbaya reacted to the 17+8 Demands that was voiced by the public, stating that the 17+8 demands are made from a minority of people that had not enough in their lives and states that the only solution is to create a more rapid economic growth. He then said that once the economy has grown by 7-8%, those demands will automatically vanish and people will find jobs and consume well instead of protesting.

His statement was widely condemned by the protesters because his statement underestimated the public. Facing backlash, Purbaya apologized to the public in a handover ceremony. He then admitted that he is still "learning the ropes" and called himself a "shocked minister" with a "cowboy" mouth. He promised to be more careful in making statements of his own.

Sadewa then further clarified what he meant by his statements made during his inauguration. Purbaya explained that his statement was based on economic concepts and his experience. He believes that accelerated economic growth will not necessarily lead to inflation because Indonesia's economic capacity still has room for growth.

=== Son's reaction to appointment ===
Purbaya's younger son, Yudo Achilles Sadewa nonchalantly reacted to his father's appointment to the ministry of finance in which he wrote indirectly criticizing Sri Mulyani: "Thank God, my father has toppled a CIA agent that disguised as a minister" in his Instagram account. Yudo's statement became viral and sparked a public debate. Not long after being viral, Yudo's account cannot be found in public. Purbaya commented that he had warned his son on his social media conduct.

=== Connections with Luhut ===
Purbaya's connection with Luhut Binsar Pandjaitan also became a controversy as members of the public speculated that Purbaya is in a league with Luhut's political ambitions. This is because Purbaya was recorded to occupy key positions in governmental projects under Luhut under the following:

- Deputy III for Strategic Issue Management at the Presidential Staff Office when Luhut served as Chief of Presidential Staff (2015).
- Special Staff at the Coordinating Ministry for Political, Legal, and Security Affairs when Luhut led the ministry (2015).
- Deputy for Coordination of Maritime Sovereignty and Energy at the Coordinating Ministry for Maritime Affairs and Investment (2018–2020) under Luhut.

== See also ==
- Sri Mulyani
- Danareksa
- Indonesia Deposit Insurance Corporation
- List of ministers of finance (Indonesia)

Political offices
Preceded by Sri Mulyani	Minister of Finance; 2025–2026	Succeeded by Suahasil Nazara
