= Mar'ie Muhammad =

Indonesian politician and philanthropist

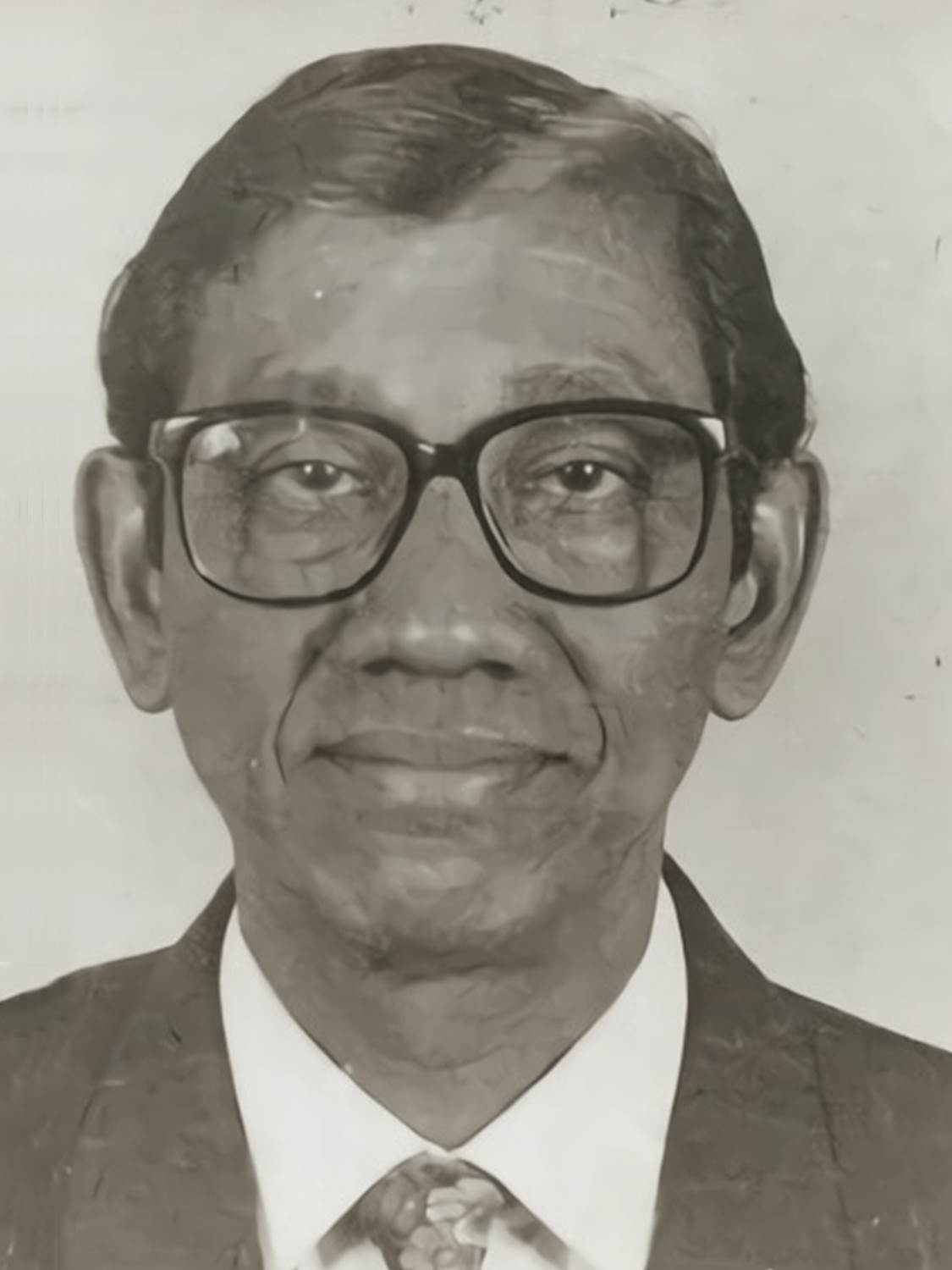

Minister of Finance
- In office 17 March 1993 – 16 March 1998
- President: Suharto
- Preceded by: J. B. Sumarlin
- Succeeded by: Fuad Bawazier

11th Chairman of the Indonesian Red Cross Society
- In office 22 December 1998 – 22 December 2009
- Preceded by: Siti Hardiyanti Rukmana
- Succeeded by: Jusuf Kalla

Personal details
- Born: 3 April 1939 Surabaya, East Java, Dutch East Indies
- Died: 11 December 2016 (aged 77) Cawang, Jakarta, Indonesia
- Children: 3
- Occupation: Economist

Mar'ie Muhammad (3 April 1939 – 11 December 2016) was an Indonesian politician and philanthropist. He served as the Minister of Finance under President Suharto from 1993 to 1998. He also served as the Chair of the Indonesian Red Cross Society (PMI) from 1998 to 2009.

During his period as Chair of PMI, the major 2004 earthquake and tsunami devastated Aceh and Nias. He travelled to areas affected and was active in arranging effective coordination between the Indonesian Red Cross and the national Indonesian Agency for Rehabilitation and Reconstruction in Aceh.

Muhammad died of brain cancer on 11 December 2016 at the National Brain Center Hospital in Cawang, Jakarta at the age of 77.

== Honours ==
- Star of Mahaputera, 2nd Class (Indonesian: Bintang Mahaputera Adipradana) (30 July 1996)
- Star of Mahaputera, 3rd Class (Indonesian: Bintang Mahaputera Utama) (12 August 1992)
