= Hanati Nazara =

- Nazara as regent

Member of the House of Representatives
- In office 1997–1999

Regent of Nias
- In office 22 October 1980 – 1986
- Preceded by: Dalimend
- Succeeded by: S. M. Mendrofa

Regional Secretary of Nias
- In office March 1976 – 22 October 1980
- Regent: Dalimend

Personal details
- Born: 1934 or 1935
- Died: 1 October 2025 (aged 90) Jakarta, Indonesia

Hanati Nazara (1934/1935 – 1 October 2025) was an Indonesian politician and bureaucrat. He served as a member of the House of Representatives from 1997 to 1999, and as the regent of Nias Regency in North Sumatra between 1980 and 1986. He had previously worked as a bureaucrat, and was Nias' regional secretary from 1976 to 1980.

== Biography ==
By 1976, Nazara was a civil servant at the Ministry of Home Affairs, and in March that year he was recruited by then-regent of Nias Dalimend to become regional secretary in Nias. While in Nias, he also taught at Gunungsitoli's teachers college (IKIP Gunungsitoli). He was sworn in as regent on 22 October 1980 by North Sumatra's governor Edward Wellington Pahala Tambunan.

Shortly after being sworn in, Nazara remarked to journalists that the primary challenge the region faced was a lack of roads. Nazara noted that it was difficult for him to call a meeting with Nias' thirteen district heads (camat) due to lack of road access. He also cited a Rp 400 million (~USD 640,000 in 1980) village fund being allocated to Nias by the government as "ineffective" when divided up to hundreds of villages across the island. He served as regent until 1986.

He was elected to the House of Representatives in the 1997 Indonesian legislative election, as a Golkar candidate representing North Sumatra. In the 2004 Indonesian legislative election, Nazara ran as a Demokrat candidate in North Sumatra's 2nd electoral district. He secured 14,772 votes, but failed to win a seat.

== Personal life ==
Nazara died on 1 October 2025, at the age of 90. In 2026, Nazara's son Suahasil Nazara was appointed as Minister of Finance under president Prabowo Subianto.
