= Indonesia Deposit Insurance Corporation =

Government agency in Indonesia tasked with guaranteeing bank customer deposits

- Lembaga Penjamin Simpanan (Indonesian)

Agency overview
- Formed: September 22, 2005
- Jurisdiction: Government of Indonesia
- Headquarters: Equity Tower, 20th-21st Floor, Sudirman Central Business District (SCBD) Lot 9, Jalan Jenderal Sudirman Kav. 52-53, Jakarta 12190, Indonesia
- Agency executive: Anggito Abimanyu, Chairman
- Parent department: Indonesian Ministry of Finance
- Key document: Law Number 24 of 2004
- Website: www.lps.go.id

The Indonesia Deposit Insurance Corporation (Indonesian: Lembaga Penjamin Simpanan, abbreviated as LPS) is an independent government agency in Indonesia tasked with guaranteeing bank customer deposits and maintaining banking system stability. Established under Law Number 24 of 2004 on September 22, 2004, it began operations on September 22, 2005.

== Background ==
The 1998 Asian financial crisis triggered a monetary and banking crisis in Indonesia, prompting the government to implement a blanket guarantee to restore public confidence by covering all bank payment obligations, including customer deposits. This policy, while effective, created moral hazard risks. To address this, a limited guarantee system was mandated, leading to the creation of LPS in 2004 to protect depositors and stabilize the banking sector.

== Deposit Guarantee ==
Since October 13, 2008, LPS guarantees deposits up to IDR 2 billion per customer per bank, covering principal and accrued interest, as stipulated by Government Regulation Number 66 of 2008. Deposits are guaranteed if they meet specific criteria: they must be recorded in the bank’s books, have interest rates not exceeding LPS’s specified limit, and the customer must not have engaged in actions harmful to the bank, such as fraud.

== Functions and Duties ==
LPS' primary functions are to guarantee customer deposits and contribute to banking system stability. In 2020, a presidential decree expanded LPS' role to assist the Financial Services Authority (OJK) in supervising banks under "intensive supervision" status, allowing LPS to inject cash to address liquidity or solvency issues. LPS can raise funds through government bond transactions, issuing its own bonds, or borrowing from the government. Additionally, LPS is tasked with preparing policy guarantee programs, with a target completion date of mid-2025, as part of the Financial Sector Development and Strengthening Law (P2SK Law) enacted in 2023.

== Recent Developments ==
In January 2025, LPS announced plans to finalize its policy guarantee program by mid-2025, coordinating with the OJK, Ministry of Finance, and State Secretariat to issue necessary government regulations. By December 2024, LPS guaranteed 99.94% of commercial bank customer accounts (608,850,379 accounts) and 99.98% of rural bank accounts (15,817,553 accounts). In 2023, LPS adjusted its deposit guarantee interest rate to 4.25% in February, following criticism that its rates lagged behind Bank Indonesia’s policy rate increases, which reached 5.75% to address inflation and currency stability.

== Leadership ==
=== Chair of the Board of Commissioners ===
The following table lists the Chairs of the Board of Commissioners of the Indonesia Deposit Insurance Corporation (LPS):

Name	Tenure
Rudjito	2005–2010
Heru Budiargo	2010–2015
Halim Alamsyah	2015–2020
Purbaya Yudhi Sadewa	2020–2025
Anggito Abimanyu	2025–present

=== Members of the Board of Commissioners ===
The following table lists the current Members of the Board of Commissioners:[

Name	Role	Tenure
Didik Madiyono	Member	2019–present
Luky Alfirman	Ex-Officio, Ministry of Finance	2019–present
Dian Ediana Rae	Ex-Officio, OJK	2022–present
Aida Suwandi Budiman	Ex-Officio, Bank Indonesia	2024–present

=== Executive Directors ===
The following table lists the current Executive Directors of LPS:

Name	Role
Ary Zulfikar	Legal Affairs
Priyanto Budi Nugroho	Surveillance, Examination, and Statistics
Danu Febrianto	Finance
Suwandi	Claims and Bank Resolution
Rudi Rahman	Acting, Human Resources and Administration
Ridwan Nasution	Strategic Management and Policy Formulation
Arinto Wicaksono	Risk Management, Compliance, and Governance
Hermawan Wibowo	Acting, Banking Restructuring and Institutional Relations
Jarot Marhaendro	Insurance Surveillance, Data, and Examination
