= National Economic Council (Indonesia) =

Indonesian economic advisory council

- Dewan Ekonomi Nasional
- Seal of the National Economic Council

Council overview
- Formed: 30 November 1999; 26 years ago 21 October 2024; 23 months ago (revival)
- Dissolved: 1 September 2000 (first)
- Jurisdiction: Government of Indonesia
- Headquarters: Jl. M.H. Thamrin No.8, Jakarta, Indonesia 10340
- Employees: 72+
- Council executives: Luhut Binsar Pandjaitan, Chairman; Mari Elka Pangestu, Deputy Chairwoman
- Website: http://dewanekonomi.go.id/

The National Economic Council (Indonesian: Dewan Ekonomi Nasional) is an Indonesian government economic advisory council that advises the President on strategic economic policy formulation and recommendation. The council is led by a chairman, Luhut Binsar Pandjaitan, since 21 October 2024.

First established on November 30, 1999 under the leadership of President Abdurrahman Wahid. However, this institution was disbanded through Presidential Decree No. 122/P of 2000 in less than a year of its operation on September 1, 2000.

On October 20, 2024, the National Economic Council was re-established by President Prabowo Subianto with institutional status at the same level as a ministry based on Presidential Decree No. 139/P of 2024.

Despite originating from the former Coordinating Ministry of Maritime and Investment Affairs, the council does not coordinate technical ministries like coordinating ministry. The council only produces presidential studies containing strategic economic policy formulations and recommendations reserved for the president's eyes only. The coordination of economic affairs is done by the Coordinating Ministry for Economic Affairs, except fiscal and monetary which are the domains of the Ministry of Finance.

Despite secretive nature of the work of the council, National Economic Council also produced unclassified working papers for public release under name of DEN Working Papers series.

== Council Members ==
The First National Economic Council (1999–2000) members was:

Position	Name
Chairperson	Emil Salim
Deputy Chairperson	Subiakto Tjakrawerdaya
Secretary	Sri Mulyani
Members	Anggito Abimanyu; Boediono; Harbrinderjit Singh Dillon; Bambang Subianto; Kuntoro Mangkusubroto; Hadi Soesastro; Arsyad Anwar; Gunami Soeworo; Hasan Zein Mahmud; Teddy Rahmat

The Second National Economic Council (2024–) members are:

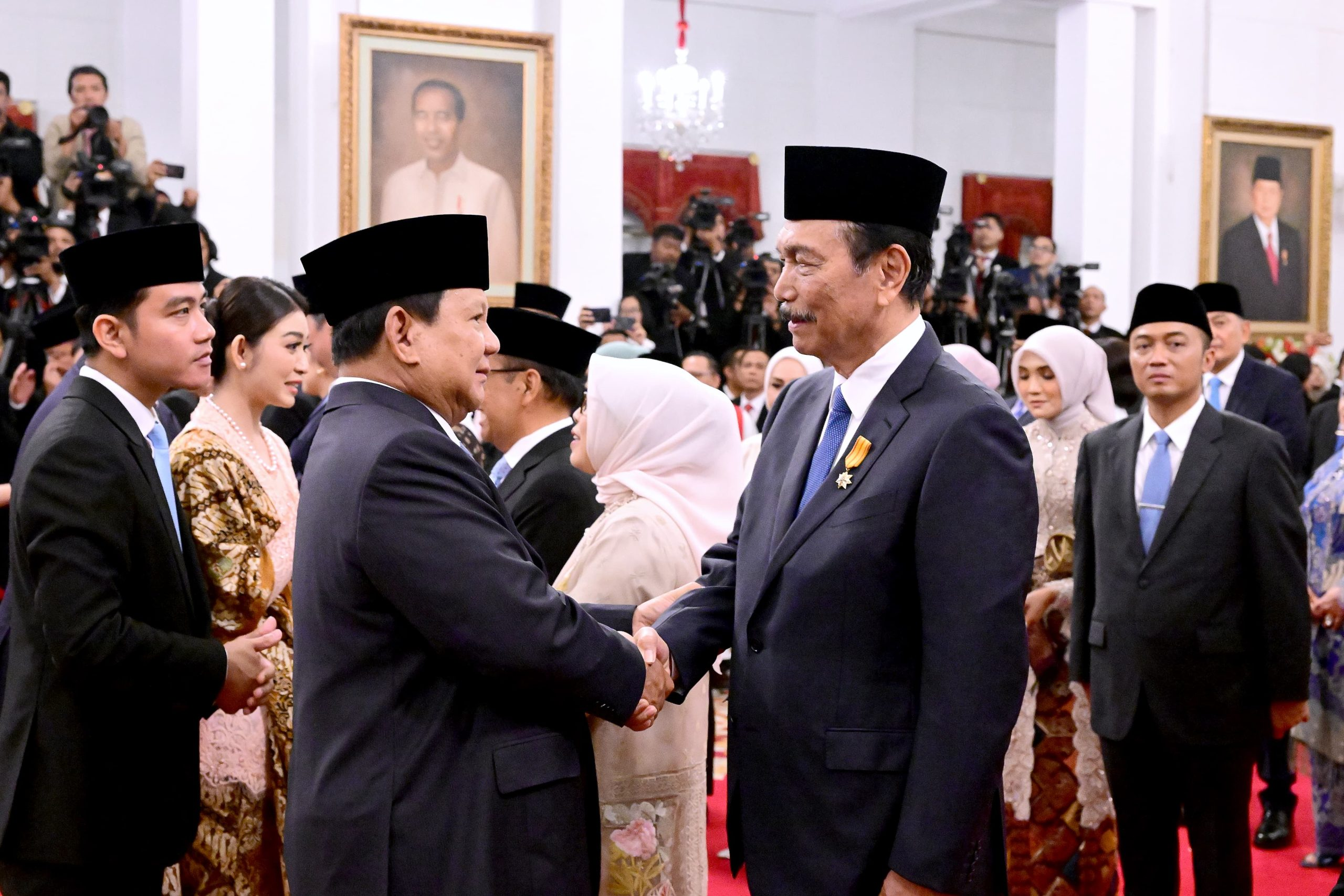
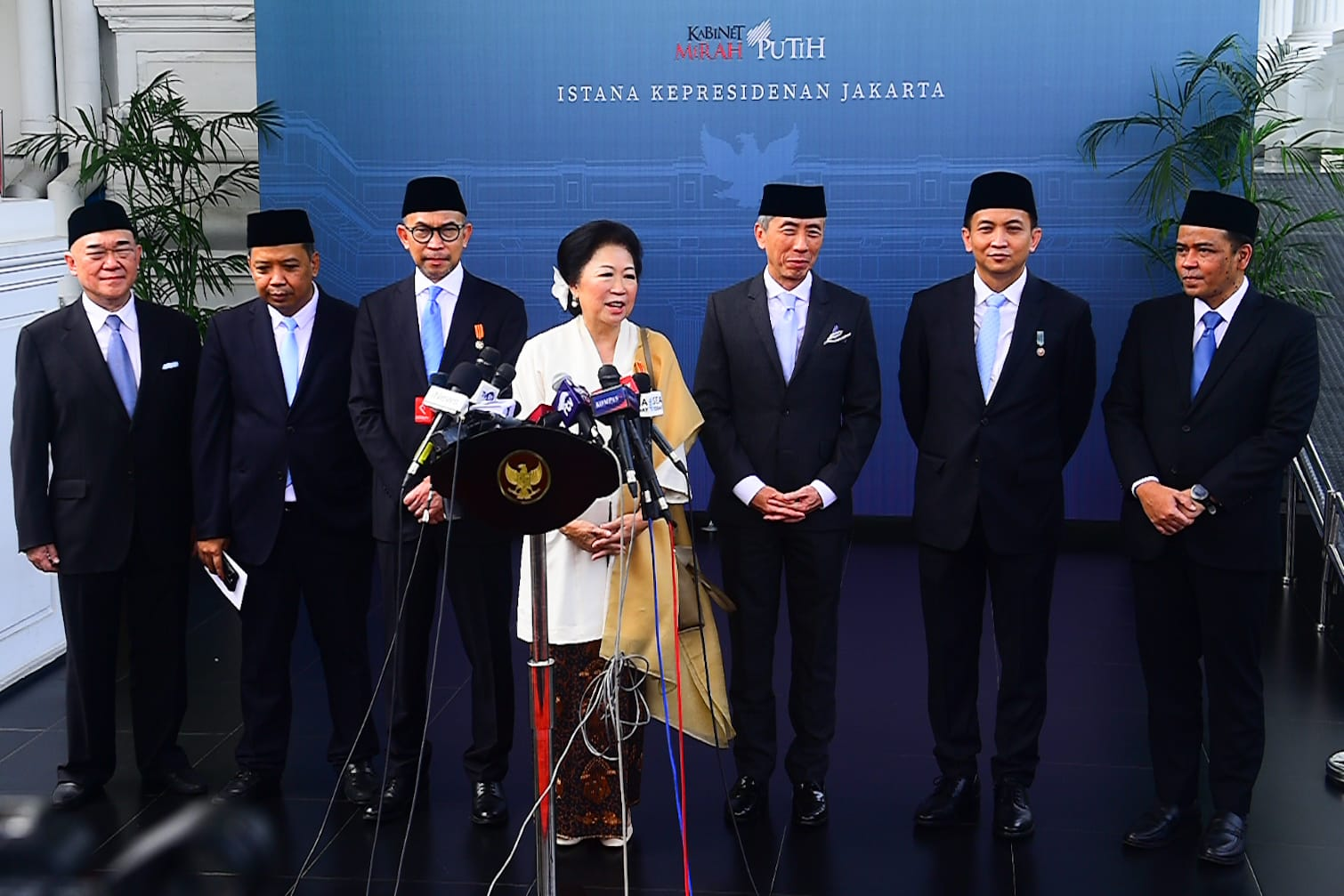
LB Pandjaitan inaugurated as National Economic Council Chairperson (top); Deputy Chairman and Members after inauguration (bottom)

As of October 21, 2024, National Economic Council is led by Luhut Binsar Pandjaitan, a retired TNI officer and former minister under the leadership of Abdurrahman Wahid and Joko Widodo.

Position	Name
Chairperson	Luhut Binsar Pandjaitan
Deputy Chairperson	Mari Elka Pangestu
Members	Chatib Basri; Arief Anshory Yusuf; Haryanto Adikoesoemo; Heriyanto Irawan; Septian Hario Seto; Firman Hidayat

== Organization ==
=== Organization and Secretariat ===
Based on Presidential Decree No. 160/2024 and as expanded with National Economic Council Decree No. 1/2024, the National Economic Council is organized into the following:

- National Economic Council
  - Office of the National Economic Council Chair
  - Office of the National Economic Council Deputy Chair
- Executive Secretariat
  - Office of the Executive Secretary
  - Office of the Head Secretary
  - Executive Directorate for Economic Strategies and Policies
  - Executive Directorate for Acceleration of Economic Priority Programs
  - Executive Directorate for Policy Synchronization of Economic Priority Programs
  - Executive Directorate for Monitoring and Evaluation of Economic Priority Programs

To assist the work of the council, Ministry of the State Secretariat also provide the council a secretariat office under the ministry, National Economic Council Secretariat, thru Ministry of the State Secretariat Decree No. 10/2024.

=== Professional Staffs ===
Not including the general staffs that working in the council' daily administration, The Professional Staffs (Tenaga Profesional) are the council staffs that performing research and analysis for the council. They work directly under the coordination of the executive directorate. By National Economic Council Decree No. 1/2024, the number of the professional staffs are limited to 72, can be sourced from government employees or not. The professional staffs consist of:

- Senior Advisors, Equivalent to Echelon I.b (Tenaga Ahli Utama, Disetarakan Eselon I.b), maximum 12 within the council
- Advisors, Equivalent to Echelon II.a (Tenaga Ahli Madya, Disetarakan Eselon II.a), maximum 24 within the council
- Assistant Advisors, Equivalent to Echelon III.a (Tenaga Ahli Muda, Disetarakan Eselon III.a) and Junior Advisors, Equivalent to Echelon III.a (Tenaga Terampil, Disetarakan Eselon III.a), maximum 36 within the council
