= Rini Soemarno =

Indonesian politician and economist

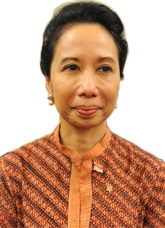
- Portrait Rini Soemarno, Former Minister of State Owned Enterprises of Working Cabinet

7th Ministry of State-Owned Enterprises
- In office 27 October 2014 – 20 October 2019
- President: Joko Widodo
- Vice President: Muhammad Jusuf Kalla
- Preceded by: Dahlan Iskan
- Succeeded by: Erick Thohir

20th Minister of Industry and Trade
- In office 10 August 2001 – 22 October 2004
- President: Megawati Soekarnoputri
- Vice President: Hamzah Haz
- Preceded by: Luhut Binsar Panjaitan
- Succeeded by: Mari Elka Pangestu (Trade); Andung Nitimiharja (Industry)

Personal details
- Born: Rini Mariani Soemarno; 9 June 1958 (age 68) Maryland, United States
- Party: Independent
- Spouse: Soewandi
- Relations: Ongky P. Soemarno (brother)
- Children: 3
- Parents: Soemarno (father); Raden Ayu Soetrepti Martonagoro (mother)
- Education: Wellesley College
- Occupation: Politician
- Profession: Economist
- Cabinet: Mutual Assistance Cabinet; Working Cabinet

Rini Mariani Soemarno (born 9 June 1958) is an Indonesian economist and was the Minister of State-Owned Enterprises in President Joko Widodo's Working Cabinet. She graduated from Wellesley College, Massachusetts, in 1981. She served as Minister of Industry and Trade in Megawati Sukarnoputri's Mutual Assistance Cabinet from 2001 to 2004.
