= Coordinating Ministry for Maritime and Investment Affairs =

Indonesian government ministry

- Kementerian Koordinator Bidang Kemaritiman dan Investasi
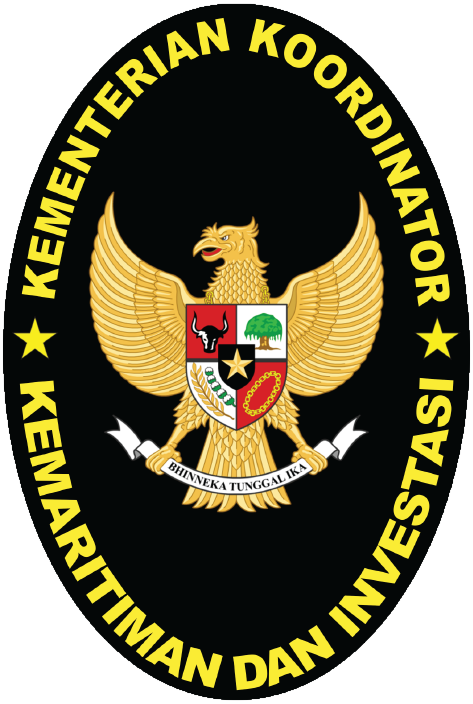
- Seal of the Coordinating Ministry for Maritime and Investment Affairs

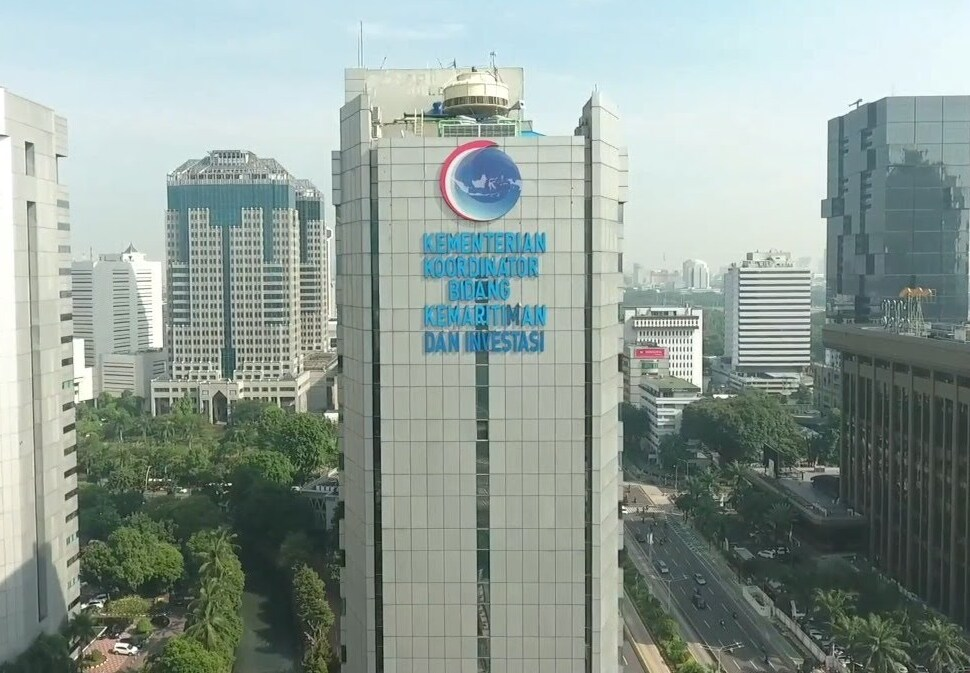
- Coordinating Ministry for Maritime and Investment Affairs headquarters

Agency overview
- Formed: 27 October 2014
- Dissolved: 20 October 2024
- Superseding agencies: Coordinating Ministry for Economic Affairs (Large part); Coordinating Ministry for Infrastructure and Regional Development; Coordinating Ministry for Food; Coordinating Ministry for Social Empowerment; National Economics Council
- Jurisdiction: Government of Indonesia
- Headquarters: Gedung Kemaritiman, 3rd Floor; Jalan M.H. Thamrin No. 8 Jakarta Pusat 10340; Jakarta, Indonesia
- Minister responsible: Luhut Binsar Pandjaitan, Coordinating Minister for Maritime and Investment Affairs
- Website: maritim.go.id

Coordinating Ministry for Maritime and Investment Affairs (Indonesian: Kementerian Koordinator Bidang Kemaritiman dan Investasi) was the Indonesian government ministry in charge of planning, coordinating as well as synchronizing policies in maritime affairs and investment. The coordinating minister for Maritime and Investment Affairs was Luhut Binsar Pandjaitan.

On 20 October 2024, the coordinating ministry disbanded. Most of its functions coordinating energy, investment, and tourism will be subsumed to the Coordinating Ministry for Economic Affairs, while the rest will be divided into other coordinating ministries and National Economics Council.

== Portfolio and function ==
After his inauguration, President Joko Widodo announced his new cabinet, "Kabinet Indonesia Maju" on October 23, 2019. There are some nomenclature changes for some ministries including the Coordinating Ministry for Maritime Affairs. It becomes The Coordinating Ministry for Maritime and Investment Affairs. Previously, as stipulated in the Presidential Regulation No. 10/2015. The coordinating Ministry for Maritime and Affairs has the following functions:

- Coordinates and synchronizes the formulation, establishment and implementation of ministries policies in maritime affairs.
- Controls ministries' policies implementation in maritime affairs.
- Coordinates the implementation of the task, development, and provides administrative support to all elements of the organisation within the Coordinating Ministry for Maritime Affairs.
- Coordinates and synchronizes maritime state resilience development and maritime resources management.
- Coordinates maritime infrastructure development policies.
- Manages the state wealth under the responsibility of the Coordinating Ministry for Maritime Affairs.
- Supervises duties deliver in the Coordinating Ministry for Maritime Affairs.
- Delivers special tasks given by the President.

The coordinating ministry task later expanded by including investment to its portfolio in Joko Widodo's second administration.

== Coordinated ministries and agencies ==
Coordinated ministries and agencies in Coordinating Ministry for Maritime Affairs are:

- Ministry of Transportation
- Ministry of Maritime Affairs and Fisheries
- Ministry of Public Works and Housing
- Ministry of Tourism and Creative Economy
- Ministry of Energy and Mineral Resources
- Ministry of Environment and Forestry
- Ministry of Investment

== Organization Structure ==
Based on Presidential Decree No. 92/2019 and Coordinating Ministry for Maritime and Investment Affairs Decree No. 10/2020, the coordinating ministry consisted of:

1. Office of the Coordinating Minister for Maritime and Investment Affairs
2. Office of the Secretary of Coordinating Ministry for Maritime and Investment Affairs
  1. Bureau of Planning
  2. Bureau of Legal Affairs
  3. Bureau of Communication
    1. Section of Leadership Administration
      1. Sub-section of Protocols
      2. Sub-section of Coordinating Ministry Administration
      3. Sub-section of Coordinating Ministry Secretariat Administration
      4. Sub-section of Expert Staffs Administration
  4. Bureau of General Affairs
    1. Section of Household Affairs and Procurement
      1. Sub-section of Household Affairs
      2. Sub-section of Procurement
3. Deputy I (Coordination for Maritime and Energy Sovereignty)
  1. Office of the Deputy I
  2. Office of the Deputy I Secretariat
  3. Assistant Deputyship of Maritime Law and Agreement
  4. Assistant Deputyship of Maritime Security and Defense
  5. Assistant Deputyship of Maritime Zone and Border Delimitation
  6. Assistant Deputyship of Maritime Navigation and Safety
  7. Assistant Deputyship of Energy
4. Deputy II (Coordination for Maritime Resources)
  1. Office of the Deputy II
  2. Office of the Deputy II Secretariat
  3. Assistant Deputyship of Spatial Marine and Coastal Management
  4. Assistant Deputyship of Captured Fishing Management
  5. Assistant Deputyship of Development of Fisheries
  6. Assistant Deputyship of Competitive Development
  7. Assistant Deputyship of Maritime Resource Down-streaming
5. Deputy III (Coordination for Infrastructure and Transportation Affairs)
  1. Office of the Deputy III
  2. Office of the Deputy III Secretariat
  3. Assistant Deputyship of Basic Infrastructure, Urban, and Water Resources
  4. Assistant Deputyship of Infrastructure for Areal Development
  5. Assistant Deputyship of Infrastructure for Connectivity
  6. Assistant Deputyship of Industries for Supporting Infrastructure Development
  7. Assistant Deputyship of Industries for Maritime and Transportation Development
6. Deputy IV (Coordination for Environmental Management and Forestry)
  1. Office of the Deputy IV
  2. Office of the Deputy IV Secretariat
  3. Assistant Deputyship of Forest Planology and Environmental Management
  4. Assistant Deputyship of Forest Products and Environmental Services Management
  5. Assistant Deputyship of Water Basins Management and Environmental Resources Conservation
  6. Assistant Deputyship of Solid and Liquid Waste Management
  7. Assistant Deputyship of Climate Change and Disaster
7. Deputy V (Coordination for Tourism and Creative Economy)
  1. Office of the Deputy V
  2. Office of the Deputy V Secretariat
  3. Assistant Deputyship of Sustainable Tourism Development
  4. Assistant Deputyship of Creative Economy Development
  5. Assistant Deputyship of Capital Funding for Tourism and Creative Economy
  6. Assistant Deputyship of Intellectual Properties for Tourism and Creative Economy
  7. Assistant Deputyship of Human Resources for Tourism and Creative Economy
8. Deputy VI (Coordination for Investment and Mining)
  1. Office of the Deputy VI
  2. Office of the Deputy VI Secretariat
  3. Assistant Deputyship of Strategies and Policies for Investment Acceleration
  4. Assistant Deputyship of Investment in Services
  5. Assistant Deputyship of Strategic Investments
  6. Assistant Deputyship of Investment Cooperation between Government and Business Entities
  7. Assistant Deputyship of Mining
9. General Inspectorate
10. Expert Staffs
  1. Expert Staffs of Maritime Law
  2. Expert Staffs of Socio-Anthropology
  3. Expert Staffs of Maritime Economy
  4. Expert Staffs of Connectivity Management

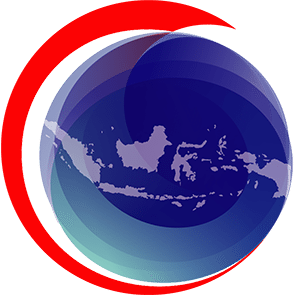
Previous logo of the Coordinating Ministry for Maritime and Investment Affairs

== Minister ==
No.	Portrait	Minister	Took office	Left office	Time in office	Cabinet
1	Ali Sadikin	Ali Sadikin (7 July 1927–20 May 2008); Coordinating Minister for Maritime Compartment	27 August 1964	22 February 1966	1 year, 213 days	Dwikora I (27 August 1964 – 22 February 1966); Dwikora II (22 February 1966 – 28 March 1966)
2	Jatidjan Sastroredjo (id)	Vice Admiral; Jatidjan Sastroredjo (id) (26 November 1926–12 January 2008); Minister for Maritime Affairs	28 July 1966	17 October 1967	1 year, 78 days	Ampera I (28 July 1966 – 14 October 1967)
3	Dwisuryo Indroyono Soesilo (id)	Dwisuryo Indroyono Soesilo (id) (born 27 March 1955); Coordinating Minister for Maritime Affairs	27 October 2014	12 August 2015	289 days	Working (27 October 2014 – 20 October 2019)
4	Rizal Ramli	Rizal Ramli (10 December 1954–2 January 2024); Coordinating Minister for Maritime Affairs	12 August 2015	27 July 2016	350 days	Working (27 October 2014 – 20 October 2019)
5	Luhut Binsar Pandjaitan	Luhut Binsar Pandjaitan (born 28 September 1947); Coordinating Minister for Maritime Affairs	27 July 2016	20 October 2024	8 years, 85 days	Working (27 October 2014 – 20 October 2019); Onward Indonesia (23 October 2019 – 20 October 2024)
