= Juan José Daboub =

Government minister of El Salvador

Juan Jose Daboub
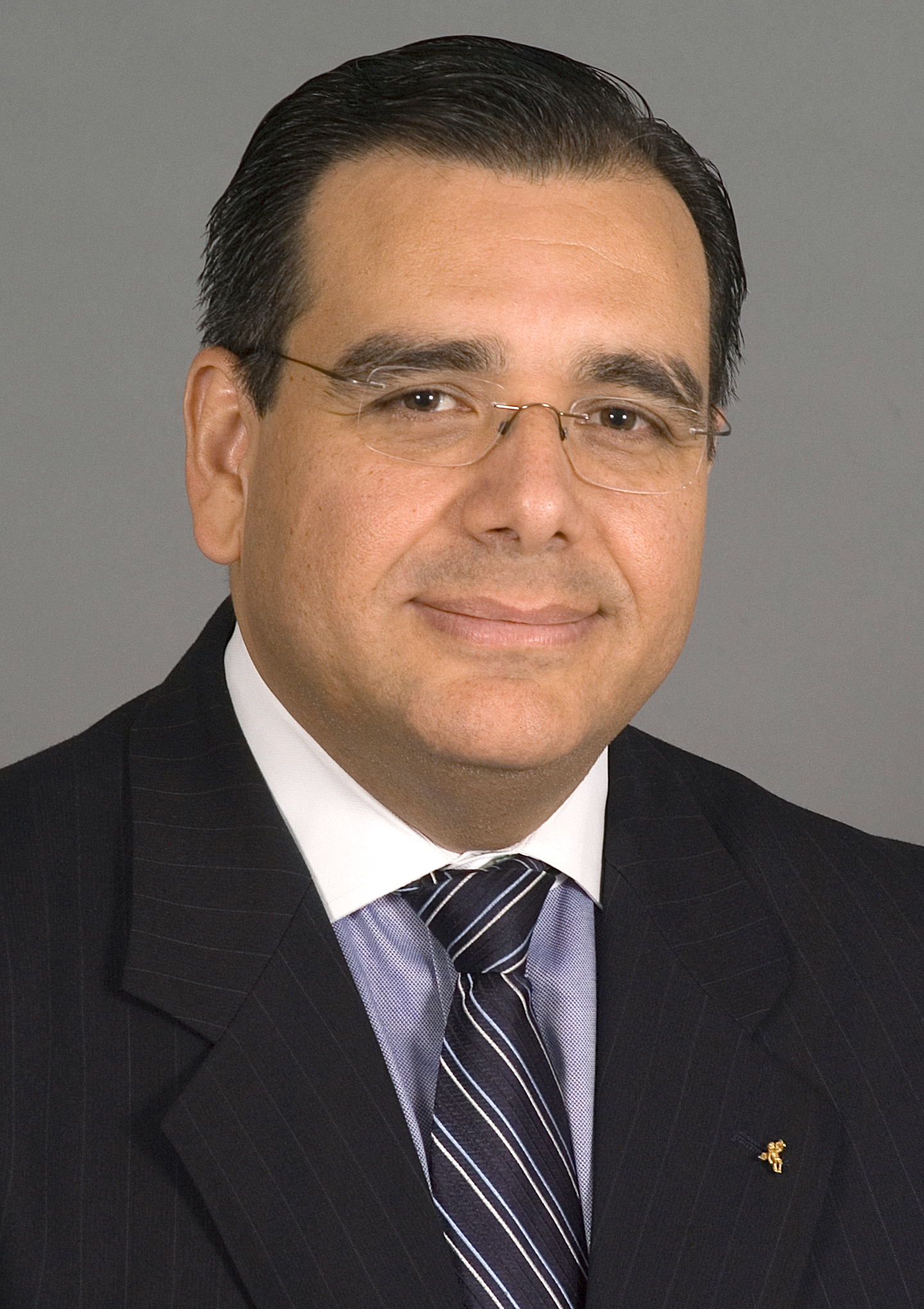

Managing Director of World Bank Group
- In office June 28, 2006 – June 30, 2010
- Succeeded by: Sri Mulyani Indrawati

Minister of Finance of El Salvador
- In office 2001–2004
- Preceded by: José Luis Trigueros Gómez
- Succeeded by: José Guillermo López Suarez

President of ANTEL
- In office 1996–1998

Personal details
- Born: 4 July 1963 (age 62) San Salvador, El Salvador

Juan Jose Daboub, is the chairman and CEO of The Daboub Partnership, Founding Chief Executive Officer of the Global Adaptation Institute and former managing director of the World Bank (2006–2010). He has taught at Princeton University and is a member of several boards of directors.

Prior to joining the Bank Group, he served concurrently as El Salvador's Minister of Finance and Chief of Staff to the President. He was Minister of Finance from 2001 to 2004.

After leaving the Bank, he launched the Global Adaptation Institute, a non-profit concerned with resilience against climate change and other global forces. He is also co-chair of The World Economic Forum Global Agenda Council on Climate Change, an Advisory Panel member of the UNFCCC Momentum for Change initiative and chairman and CEO of The Daboub Partnership.

He has spoken extensively at high-level international conferences on economic freedom, prosperity and development issues, including the World Economic Forum, the Union for the Mediterranean, the World Bank-IMF Annual Meetings, OECD, Transparency International, the BOAO Forum, and the Atlantic Basin Initiative.

== Biography ==
Daboub worked in both the public and private sectors, as well as in academia. He led family-owned businesses for nearly a decade before joining the board of CEL, El Salvador's electric utility, and he presided over El Salvador's electric distribution companies. Subsequently, he was named president of ANTEL, the state-owned telecommunications company, which he re-structured and privatized through a competitive process. Daboub served in three different governments over twelve years without belonging to any political party, and then returned to the private sector. In 2004, one electronic news paper enquired about a claim of abuse of authority, an investigation was never conducted due to a lack of proofs.

From 2004 to 2006, Daboub joined former President Flores of El Salvador in forming the America Libre Institute, where he worked in several projects implementing proven public policies that had been successfully deployed throughout Latin America. In 2014, this Institute was part of an investigation conducted by politicians from political parties opposite to that of Former President Flores for possible misuse of donations from Taiwan; a case is open in Court to determine if any wrongdoing was ever committed by Former President Flores.

He was born into a close-knit Arabic family, raised in El Salvador, and holds a Bachelor, Master and Ph.D. in Industrial Engineering from North Carolina State University. He is married to Glorybell Silhy de Daboub, and has four children.

== Current Initiatives ==
In 2012, Daboub began his two-year appointment as chairman of the World Economic Forum Council on Climate Change. In 2012–14, the Council on Climate Change has developed and published recommendations for effective climate adaptation, including sources of funding, metrics and a better understanding of resource and supply chain risk and opportunities. In addition, it will advance new models for effective climate governance to achieve the goals of the Durban Platform in 2015.

In 2013, he was selected by the United Nation Framework Convention on Climate Change (UNFCCC) to serve on the Momentum for Change Advisory Panel. The panel recommends to the UNFCCC mitigation and adaptation activities that are a result of collaborative efforts between the public and private sectors and bring multiple benefits to the urban poor in developing countries.

He is currently chairman and CEO of The Daboub Partnership, an initiative of Arcis, LLC dealing with public and private organizations around the world.

He is a member of the Board of Directors of Philip Morris International, the multinational tobacco company.

== Tenure at World Bank ==
As managing director of the World Bank, Daboub oversaw operations in 110 countries in Africa, the Middle East, East Asia and Latin America. He was also responsible for the oversight of the Human Development and Sustainable Development Networks, the Information Systems Group, the World Bank Institute, the Department of Institutional Integrity and the Arab World Initiative.

He drove a number of corporate initiatives and reforms: leading the World Bank Group's Governance and Anti-Corruption agenda, contributing to the internal reform agenda; spearheading change and reorganization of the Information Systems Group and the Department of Institutional Integrity, and helping to champion the Bank's Arab World Initiative.

Daboub represented the Bank and its mission during trips to several countries grappling with key reforms and financial crises of the previous decade.

== Controversy At World Bank ==
Daboub was appointed a managing director for the World Bank by former World Bank President Paul D. Wolfowitz. During Daboub's World Bank tenure, he was alleged in 2007 to have deleted references to contraception in World Bank documents, and to have tried to water down references to global warming in Bank publications as well. It is alleged that these actions were done without the knowledge of Wolfowitz, who at that time was engrossed in controversy regarding a personal relationship with a World Bank employee. However, there is no proof of the above controversy.
