= Luhut Binsar Pandjaitan =

Indonesian politician (born 1947)

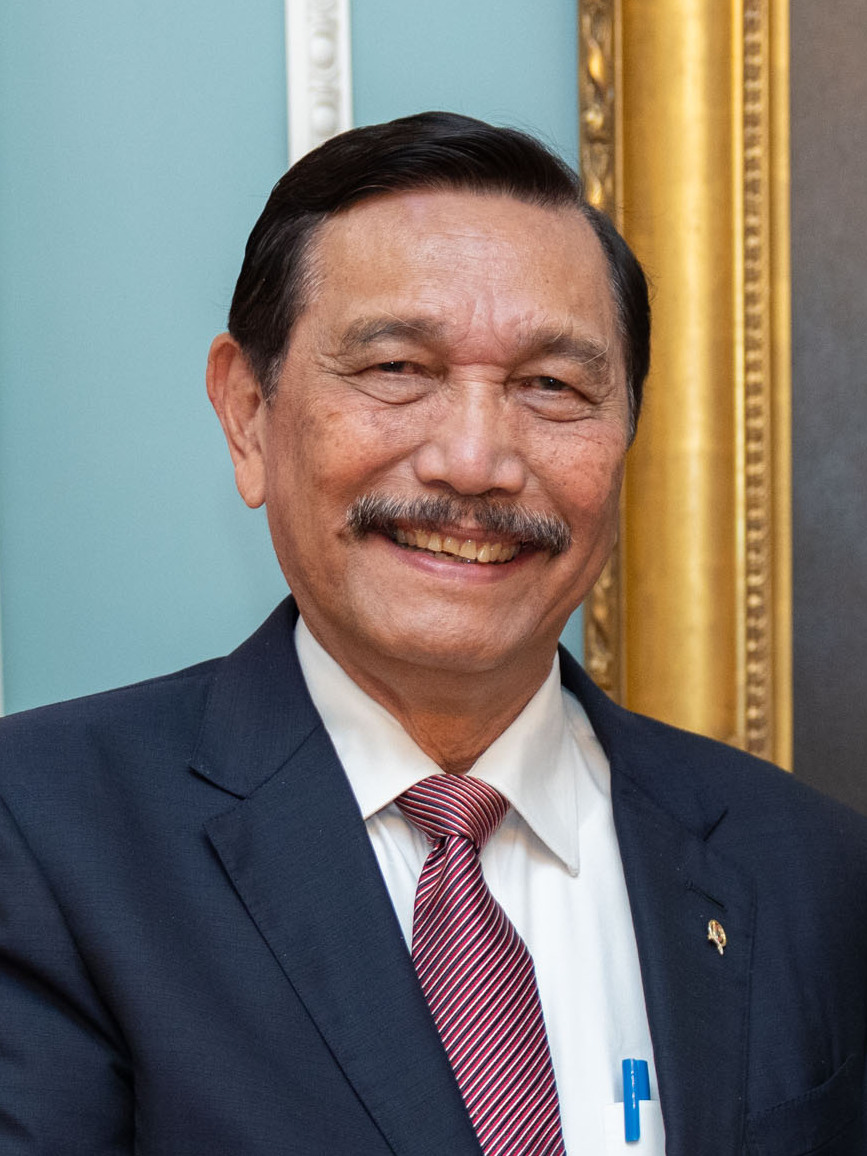
- Luhut in 2023

2nd Chair of National Economic Council
- Incumbent
- Assumed office 21 October 2024
- President: Prabowo Subianto
- Deputy: Mari Elka Pangestu
- Preceded by: Emil Salim

5th Coordinating Minister of Maritime and Investment Affairs
- In office 27 July 2016 – 20 October 2024
- President: Joko Widodo
- Preceded by: Rizal Ramli

13th Coordinating Minister of Political, Legal and Security Affairs
- In office 12 August 2015 – 27 July 2016
- President: Joko Widodo
- Preceded by: Tedjo Edhy Purdijatno
- Succeeded by: Wiranto

Minister of Energy and Mineral Resources (Acting)
- In office 15 August 2016 – 14 October 2016
- President: Joko Widodo
- Preceded by: Arcandra Tahar
- Succeeded by: Ignasius Jonan

1st Presidential Chief of Staff
- In office 31 December 2014 – 2 September 2015
- Preceded by: Position established
- Succeeded by: Teten Masduki

19th Minister of Industry and Trade
- In office 24 August 2000 – 23 July 2001
- President: Abdurrahman Wahid
- Preceded by: Jusuf Kalla
- Succeeded by: Rini Soemarno

Indonesian Ambassador to Singapore
- In office 1999–2000
- Preceded by: Herman Bernhard Leopold Mantiri
- Succeeded by: Johan S. Syahperi

Other roles
- 2018–2024: Chairman of the National Team for Increasing the Use of Domestic Production
- 2020–2023: Deputy Chairman of the COVID-19 Handling and National Economic Recovery
- 2020–2024: Chairman of the National Priority Lake Rescue Steering Committee
- 2021–2022: Coordinator for the PPKM Emergency for Java-Bali
- 2021–2024: Chairman of the Proudly Made Indonesia National Movement Team
- 2021–2023: Chairman of the High-speed Train Committee for Jakarta-Bandung

Personal details
- Born: 28 September 1947 (age 79) Silaen, North Sumatra, Indonesia
- Party: Golkar
- Spouse: Devi Simatupang
- Relations: Nurmala Kartini Sjahrir (sister)
- Children: 4
- Education: Indonesian Military Academy; George Washington University (MPA); National Defense University
- Awards: Adhi Makayasa
- Nickname: LBP

Military service
- Allegiance: Indonesia
- Branch/service: Indonesian Army
- Years of service: 1970–1999
- Rank: General (honorary)
- Unit: Infantry (Kopassus)
- Commands: Detachment 81 Counter-Terrorist
- Battles/wars: Communist insurgency in Sarawak; Operation Seroja; Insurgency in East Timor

Luhut Binsar Pandjaitan (EYD: Luhut Binsar Panjaitan, born 28 September 1947) is an Indonesian politician, businessman, and retired four-star Army general who has been serving as Chairperson of the National Economic Council since October 2024. He previously served in various posts in his political career, including the Coordinating Minister for Maritime Affairs (and Investment in 2019–2024) from July 2016 to October 2024, Coordinating Minister for Political, Legal, and Security Affairs from August 2015 to July 2016, and Chief of Staff to President Joko Widodo. He was also Minister of Trade and Industry in President Abdurrahman Wahid's cabinet and Indonesian Ambassador to Singapore from 1999 to 2000.

Luhut's military positions included Commander of the Army's elite Special Forces (Kopassus) Group 3, Commander of the Infantry Weaponry Center (Pussenif), and head of the Army Education and Training Command (Kodiklat). He was the founding commander of Detachment 81 (now Sat-81/Gultor), the counter-terrorism unit of Kopassus, where his deputy was Prabowo Subianto.

After retiring from the military, in 2004 he founded Toba Sejahtra Group, which has interests in natural resources (oil, gas, and mining), electricity generation (coal, gas and geothermal) and agriculture (palm oil).

Luhut is chairman of Del Foundation, which has established schools and a technology college for underprivileged students. He is also the founder of the Luhur Bakti Pertiwi Foundation, an institution that aims to nurture young Indonesian talents. In 2011, Luhut received Ernst & Young's Entrepreneur of the Year Award in the Social Development category.

== Early life ==
Luhut was born on 28 September 1947 in Simargala, a small hamlet in Toba, North Sumatra, as the eldest child and only son of the five children. His father, Bonar Pandjaitan (died 1982), was a retired soldier who became a Sibualbuali bus driver and executive of Caltex Petroleum Corp in Indonesia and was sent to Cornell University in the United States and graduated as engineer. Bonar was a president guard holding Lieutenant rank of Indonesian Army, during its foundation period, far before Tjakrabirawa Regiment and Presidential Security Force of Indonesia were formally instituted. For unknown reason, Bonar was demoted from his rank to First Warrant Officer, resulting to his resentment towards army and him quitting the service in 1949. His mother, Siti Farida Naiborhu (1917–2000), did not complete elementary school.

Luhut would later say that despite his mother's lack of formal education, she taught her five children to always be honest, study hard, and work hard. When Luhut was three years old, the family moved to Riau province, where his father took a job with Caltex. They lived in Rumbai district, where Luhut attended Yayasan Cendana Elementary School, which was owned by Caltex. He later attended junior high school in Pekanbaru. Luhut became a keen swimmer, practicing in the Siak River, and represented Riau at a national sports event in 1962. Despite his athletic success, his parents felt he misbehaved because he liked to get into a fight, so they sent him to school in Bandung, West Java.

Luhut attended SMAK 1 PENABUR High School in Bandung. In his final year of high school, he met Devi Simatupang, his future wife. Also in Bandung, he became one of the founders of the Indonesian Student Action Front (KAPI) and protested against founding President Sukarno's Old Order and the Communist Party of Indonesia (PKI).

== Military career ==
In 1967, Luhut entered the Indonesian Armed Forces Academy, against the wishes of his father. Three years later, he received the Adhi Makayasa annual award conferred on the best graduate.

Luhut experienced action during the Malari anti-government riots in Jakarta on 15 January 1974. He was ordered to lead a company of troops to quell rioters in Pasar Senen in Central Jakarta. He said the rioters, who were no longer student protesters, began throwing stones at his troops. Luhut responded by ordering his men to fire warning shots, but he said this did not affect the rioters. He then ordered his men to shoot at the legs of the rioters, and he suspected several were killed in the ensuing chaos as troops were not equipped with rubber bullets. His men chased the rioters to Jalan Juanda, to Glodok, and on to the Kramat Tunggak brothel complex in North Jakarta, where Luhut arrested human rights activist Johannes Cornelis Princen.

Luhut served four times in East Timor, first as a 28-year-old in the December 1975 Indonesian invasion force. At that time he held the rank of first lieutenant and was the commander of Combat Detachment A Company (Denpur) in the Sandi Yudha Troop Command (Kopassandha, later Kopassus), led by Major Atang Sutisna. Around midnight on 7 December 1975, eight C-130B Hercules departed from Magetan, East Java, and six hours later reached Dili airspace. The Indonesian soldiers began to parachute in but were met by a barrage of anti-aircraft fire. Taking evasive action, the eight Hercules flew away and 72 personnel did not jump, Luhut among them.

Luhut's career continued in the Army's elite Special Forces (Kopassus), known as the Red Berets. After undergoing training at GSG 9 in West Germany with Prabowo Subianto for 22 weeks in 1981, Luhut in June 1982 established the Kopassus Anti-Terrorism Detachment 81. With the rank of infantry major, he was commander of Detachment 81 and infantry captain Prabowo was his deputy.

According to Hendro Subroto's biography of Lieutenant General Sintong Panjaitan, Perjalanan Seorang Prajurit Para Komando (published 2009), Prabowo in March 1983 put Detachment 81 forces on alert because he feared military chief Benny Moerdani and other generals were planning a coup against Suharto. Luhut did not believe there was any coup plot and ordered the troops not to take action without his command. Subsequently, the relationship between Luhut and the ambitious Prabowo soured, as Luhut was among the young officers viewed as one of "Benny's men". Benny later fell out of favor with Suharto because he warned the president that his children's greed was becoming a political liability—prompting Suharto to reduce the authority of officers close to Benny, including Luhut. According to Indonesian military historian Salim Said, Luhut was the "golden boy" of Benny Moerdani, so he became "one of the victims of the de-Benny-ization" of the military and never became Kopassus chief—a position that went to Prabowo in 1996, whereas Luhut in that year was appointed chief of the Center for Infantry Weaponry and Armaments.

In July 2019, Luhut posted on his Facebook page that as a consequence of having been Benny's golden boy, he was overlooked for promotion to Kopassus chief and Military Area Commander, but that was the price that "must be paid as a result of upright loyalty. And I am proud to be able to live the values that Mr. Benny handed down to me." Luhut has said that while he and Prabowo sometimes have disagreements, they are solidly united when it comes to the Republic of Indonesia.

In 1988, Luhut graduated from George Washington University in Washington, D.C., with a Master's degree in Public Administration. A year later, he graduated from the National Defense University in the same city.

Following the fall of Suharto in May 1998, The Wall Street Journal reported in January 1999 that Luhut is "highly regarded... untainted by allegations of widespread Suharto-era corruption, or human rights abuses". The report noted that Luhut could be a candidate for armed forces chief except that he is a Christian at a time when political Islam was rising after decades of repression.

According to retired general Kivlan Zen, the relationship between Luhut and Prabowo improved after both had left the military and entered business, as both were involved in PT Kiani Kertas, an East Kalimantan pulp producer that once belonged to Suharto crony Bob Hasan.

== Political career ==
In 1999, President BJ Habibie appointed Luhut as Indonesian ambassador to Singapore and he was credited with improving relations between the two countries.

On 26 April 2000, Habibie's successor, President Abdurrahman Wahid appointed Luhut as Minister of Trade and Industry, a position he held until Wahid was forced out of office in July 2001. Wahid's successor, Megawati Sukarnoputri, offered the same position to Luhut, but he declined it, later explaining he felt a moral responsibility to Wahid.

After his first stint as a minister, Luhut decided to run for the chairmanship of the National Sports Committee of Indonesia in 2003 but lost to fellow retired general Agum Gumelar.

Luhut later joined Golkar Party and became deputy chairman of its board from 2008-2014. He resigned from the party in May 2014 after Golkar decided to support the presidential candidacy of former general Prabowo Subianto.

Luhut's company PT Toba Sejahtra, which has timber plantations, in 2009 formed a joint venture with PT Rakabu, the furniture company owned by Joko Widodo, who was then the mayor of Solo, Central Java. Their partnership later expanded to politics, with Luhut helping to guide Widodo's political ascendency. After being elected Indonesian president in 2014, Widodo on 31 December 2014 appointed Luhut as his chief of staff. Analysts noted Luhut's lack of patronage ties to Megawati could counter claims that Widodo was a puppet of Megawati.

In 2014, Luhut chaired the Bravo 5 unit of volunteers supporting Widodo's election bid. In August 2015, Luhut was appointed Coordinating Minister for Political, Legal, and Security Affairs, a position he held until July 2016, when he was appointed Coordinating Minister of Maritime Affairs. In October 2019, following Widodo's re-election, Luhut's ministerial portfolio was expanded to cover investment. His strong influence has prompted the Indonesian media to describe him as a “prime minister”, the “second most influential cabinet member after the president” and “the real vice president”.

In January 2020, Luhut was appointed chairman of the Golkar Party's Advisory Board.

On 13 March 2020, Luhut was appointed acting minister of transportation to replace Budi Karya Sumadi, who had tested positive for a novel coronavirus.

=== Assassination issues ===
Police have said former president Suharto's youngest son Tommy Suharto on 14 January 2001 gave three bombs to an accomplice, and one of the bombs was planned to be detonated at the Trade and Industry Ministry to kill Luhut, who was then trade and industry minister, but police foiled the plot.

In May 2019, following post-election riots in Jakarta by supporters of losing candidate Prabowo Subianto, police said they uncovered a plot to assassinate four senior officials, including Luhut. Retired general Kivlan Zen, a Prabowo ally, was accused of masterminding the plot.

In January 2020, Kivlan accused Luhut of plotting to kill him. Luhut rejected the accusation, saying he already had enough work to do without killing people.

=== Opposition to religious intolerance ===
As a member of Sumatra's Batak Protestant Church, Luhut is known for his strong advocacy of religious tolerance and plurality. In January 1999, he expressed concern to the Wall Street Journal over the politicization of religion in Indonesia following the Suharto's resignation, saying: "I'm shocked at how it's being turned into a political tool by some people. It's a very dangerous thing for Indonesia." Some 20 years later in an interview published by the Singapore-based Institute of Southeast Asian Studies in October 2019, he reiterated his concern over rising religious conservatism in Indonesia, saying: "We do not want to see Indonesia become like Syria or Iraq. We want to see Indonesia as [the way] our founding fathers foresee, i.e. a diverse society. It is not easy, but I think people started to realise this after the last election. We understand the problem and we are determined to tackle this firmly."

=== Support for Chinese investment ===
Under President Widodo, Luhut has pushed for further Chinese investment in Indonesia. His frequent negotiations with China prompted critics to call him “China’s agent” and the “Chinese ambassador”.

=== Support for palm oil ===
Luhut is an avowed supporter of the palm oil industry, including biodiesel derived from palm oil, which he says is reducing poverty and improving the welfare of farmers. Luhut made a public statement in March 2019 at a palm oil forum threatening to leave the Paris Agreement amid the European Union's plan to restrict imports of Indonesian palm oil products.

=== Opposition to the destruction of illegal fishing boats and trawl net ban ===
In President Widodo's first cabinet, Luhut opposed then-Maritime Affairs and Fisheries Minister Susi Pudjiastuti's ban on the use of trawl nets, as well as her policy of sinking foreign fishing boats caught operating illegally in Indonesian waters. He said Indonesia should instead focus on increasing fish exports.

== Philanthropy and community development ==
In 2001, Luhut and his wife created the Del Foundation to educate gifted students from low-income families. This was done by establishing the Del Informatics Polytechnic near Lake Toba in Sitoluama, Toba Samosir. The polytechnic later developed into the Del Institute of Technology (IT Del). IT Del offers courses in Engineering Management, Information Systems, and Information Engineering. Lecturers at IT Del include graduates of Harvard, Wollongong University, and Bandung Institute of Technology (ITB).

Del Foundation also established Del Unggul Senior High School in Laguboti, North Sumatra, and NOAH school in Kalisari, East Jakarta. The foundation focuses on education, technology, health, and humanitarian programs. It also builds orphanages and provides scholarships.

Luhut established the Luhur Bakti Pertiwi Foundation to help produce young leaders with integrity. He also founded the Lingkar Binsa Prakarsa Foundation as an independent center for policy studies and strategic assistance.

== Business career ==
In 2004, Luhut founded PT Toba Sejahtra Group, focusing on energy and mining businesses. The group has interests in coal mining, while its subsidiaries are engaged in the oil and gas sector, agriculture (palm oil), and electricity.

PT Toba Bara Sejahtera Tbk (Toba Bara) is one of Indonesia's main producers of thermal coal and has three subsidiaries operating separate concession areas in East Kalimantan. The company commenced coal production in 2007 and has a total concession area of 7,087 hectares with a total estimated resource of 236 million tonnes. Its development began with PT Indomining in 2007, followed by PT Adimitra Baratama Nusantara (ABN) in 2008, and PT Trisensa Mineral Utama (TMU) in 2011.

On 6 July 2012, Toba Bara listed on the Indonesia Stock Exchange (IDX) with the ticker TOBA and released 210,681 million shares or 10.5% of the total paid-up capital, with proceeds amounting to Rp 400,293,900,000 with an IPO price of Rp 1,900 per share. Most of the company's coal is exported to China, Korea, Taiwan, India and Japan.

On 9 November 2016, Toba Sejahtra signed an agreement to sell 61.79% of Toba Bara’s shares to a Singapore company called Highland Strategic Holdings. The sale was completed in January 2017 and the Jakarta Globe estimated the value of the transaction at Rp 1.07 trillion ($80 million). In April 2019, London-based environmental watchdog Global Witness reported that Highland Strategic Holdings' shares were held by Watiga Trust and suggested the buyers were shell companies, and questioned who are the real owners. Luhut rejected the Global Witness report as "made up", saying he had not owned a majority stake in Toba Bara Sejahtra for many years, and that he now held only 5% or 10% of Toba Bara shares.

In November 2018, NGOs Greenpeace Indonesia, the Mining Advocacy Network (JATAM), Indonesia Corruption Watch and Auriga issued a report claiming that Luhut's shares in Toba Bara and his government position—with oversight of the mining and energy sector—constituted a conflict of interest. The report also alleged that Luhut's coal companies had abandoned mining sites without backfilling them as stipulated in Indonesia's 2009 Law on Minerals and Coal Mining, resulting in environmental damage. Luhut responded to the report by saying he had sold his ownership of Toba Bara when he became a government official and was no longer involved in the management of Toba Sejahtra. In February 2019, Luhut admitted to owning a 6,000-hectare coal mine in East Kalimantan.

Toba Sejahtera Group also holds PT Kutai Energi. In the oil and gas sector, its subsidiaries are PT Energi Mineral Langgeng and PT Fairfield Indonesia. In the electricity sector, its subsidiaries are PT Pusaka Jaya Palu Power and Kartenegara Energy Perkasa. In the plantation sector, its subsidiaries are PT Trisena Agro Lestari Sejahtra and PT Adimitra. In the industrial sector, its subsidiaries are PT Smartias Indo Gemilang, PT Rakabu Sejahtra and PT Kabil Citranusa.

PT Pusaka Jaya Palu Tower has been engaged in the electricity sector since 2007 and built a private steam-power plant.

On 22 September 2022, Luhut reported human rights activists Fatia Maulidiyanti and Haris Azhar to the Greater Jakarta Metropolitan Regional Police under the Electronic Information and Transactions Law, alleging that they had disseminated information online that contained defamation and slander. Evidence cited against Maulidiyanti included her stating that Pandjaitan was "playing around in the mining sector" (Indonesian: bermain di dalam pertambangan-pertambangan) and she and Haris commenting on his affiliation with mining businesses in Intan Jaya. The charges against Maulidiyanti and Azhar were criticised as being "another blow to freedom of expression" in Indonesia by human rights groups.

On 8 January 2024, the East Jakarta District Court acquitted Maulidiyanti and Azhar of all charges. It ruled that their statements could not be considered fake news due to Pandjaitan being the beneficial owner of Toba Sejahtera.

== Family ==
Luhut married Devi Simatupang on 27 November 1970 and has four children: Paulina, David, Paulus and Kerri Pandjaitan. Paulus is a major in Kopassus. Luhut's son-in-law, General Maruli Simanjuntak, a Kopassus officer, in November 2023 became Chief of Staff of the Indonesian Army.

Luhut has a strained relationship with his father, Bonar, because he doesn't want to study at Bandung Institute of Technology and rather choose Indonesian Military Academy. Bonar's resentment likely stemmed from his past while he was in army. Their strained relationship resulted in the absence of him in his graduation and continued until Bonar's death in 1982.

== Honors and awards ==
1. A finalist in Ernst & Young's Indonesian Entrepreneur of the Year 2011, Luhut was given a special award for his contribution to social development.
2. Award from the National Sports Committee of Indonesia for best national sports coach of 2006, for karate.
3. USINDO's (United States-Indonesia Society) Highest Award for advancing U.S.-Indonesia relations.
4. "Father of Palm Oil Governance" Award from the Indonesian Palm Oil Farmers Association or APKASINDO (Asosiasi Petani Kelapa Sawit Indonesia) for strengthening palm oil governance from upstream to downstream.

=== National ===
During the course of his military career, Luhut received the following awards.

1. Adhi Makayasa as the best graduate from Army academy (1970).
2. Best Military Resort Commander in Indonesia (1995).
3. Yudha Dharma Nararya Star.
4. Kartika Eka Paksi Achievement Star.
5. Kartika Eka Paksi Nararya Achievement Star.
6. Nararya III Loyalty Insignia.
7. Loyalty & Faithfulness Insignia VIII & XVIII Years.
8. GOM III/Dharma Insignia.
9. Upholder Insignia.
10. Lotus Loyalty Insignia.
11. Garuda VIII Loyalty Insignia.
12. Dwidya Sistha Insignia.
13. United Nations Honor Insignia.
- Star of the Republic of Indonesia (3rd Class) (Indonesian: Bintang Republik Indonesia Utama) (2024)
- Star of Mahaputera, 2nd Class (Indonesian: Bintang Mahaputera Adipradana) (2020)

=== Foreign honours ===
- Singapore:
  - Darjah Utama Bakti Cemerlang (Distinguished Service Order) (DUBC), 5 June 2023
- United Arab Emirates:
  - Collar of the Order of the Union, 17 July 2024

== Other activities ==
- Chairman of the Federation of Karate-do Indonesia (2001–2010)
