= Suahasil Nazara =

Indonesian economist and academic (born 1970)

- Official portrait, 2026

Minister of Finance
- Incumbent
- Assumed office 14 September 2026
- President: Prabowo Subianto
- Deputy: Juda Agung; Luky Alfirman; Nurkholisoh Ibnu Aman
- Preceded by: Purbaya Yudhi Sadewa

Deputy Minister of Finance
- In office 25 October 2019 – 14 September 2026

Personal details
- Born: 23 November 1970 (age 55) Jakarta, Indonesia
- Party: Independent
- Parent: Hanati Nazara (father)
- Education: University of Indonesia (S.E.); Cornell University (M.Sc.); University of Illinois Urbana-Champaign (Ph.D.)
- Profession: Economist; academic

Suahasil Nazara (born 23 November 1970) is an Indonesian economist and academic who has served as minister of finance since September 2026. He previously served as deputy minister of finance from 2019 to 2026 and was a lecturer and professor at the University of Indonesia.

== Early life ==
Suahasil was born in Jakarta on 23 November 1970. His father was politician and bureaucrat Hanati Nazara who served as the regent of Nias from 1981 until 1986, and later served as a member of the House of Representatives from 1997 to 1999.

He studied economics at the University of Indonesia (UI) and graduated with a bachelor's degree in 1994. Suahasil then continued his studies abroad, obtaining his master's degree from Cornell University and his Ph.D. from the University of Illinois Urbana-Champaign in 1997 and 2003 respectively.

== Career ==
Suahasil wearing his academic dress as a full professor in economics at the University of Indonesia, 2025.

He started his career in academia, becoming a lecturer at the Faculty of Economics and Business at UI in 1999. He went on to become head of the graduate economics program from 2004 to 2005 and head of the Institute for Demographic Studies from 2005 to 2008. Suahasil was appointed a professor in October 2009. He was also chair of the economics department at UI from 2009 to 2013.

Outside of academia, Suahasil served in an advisory team to the finance minister on fiscal decentralization from 2009 to 2011. He was also appointed a policy coordinator at the National Team for the Acceleration of Poverty Reduction (TNP2K), which was under the office of the vice president, and served from 2010 until 2015. Suahasil was also a member of the National Economic Council from 2013 to 2014.

He joined the leadership of the Ministry of Finance in 2015, and became head of the Fiscal Policy Agency in October 2016. In 2019, he was appointed by President Joko Widodo as a deputy minister of finance in the Onward Indonesia Cabinet. He retained his post as deputy minister in the Red and White Cabinet of President Prabowo Subianto. Following the dismissal of Purbaya Yudhi Sadewa, he was appointed the new minister of finance in September 2026.

== Personal life ==
Suahasil Nazara and his wife

According to the State Official Wealth Report (LHKPN), his reported wealth stood at approximately 138 billion rupiahs. This includes various property assets distributed across Jakarta and Depok, including land and a building in South Jakarta reportedly worth around 28 billion rupiahs. However, most of his assets are composed of securities which account for almost 67 billion rupiahs.

Political offices
| Preceded by Purbaya Yudhi Sadewa | Minister of Finance; 2026–present | Incumbent |
