= List of ministers of finance (Indonesia) =

Minister of Finance
- Menteri Keuangan
- Seal of the Ministry of Finance

- Incumbent; Suahasil Nazara since 14 September 2026
- Ministry of Finance
- Member of: Cabinet; Committee for Stabilization Financial System
- Reports to: President
- Seat: Jl. Dr. Wahidin Raya No. 1 Jakarta 10710
- Appointer: President
- Inaugural holder: Samsi Sastrawidagda
- Formation: 19 August 1945; 81 years ago
- Deputy: Vice Minister of Finance
- Website: www.kemenkeu.go.id

The Minister of Finance of the Republic of Indonesia (Indonesian: Menteri Keuangan) is the head of the Indonesian Ministry of Finance. The minister is tasked with organizing government affairs in the field of state finances to assist the President in administering state government.

The current minister of finance is Suahasil Nazara, who has served in the position since 14 September 2026. The minister is supported by the a Deputy Ministers of Finance.

== List of ministers ==
The following are a list of persons and politicians who have been appointed as the minister of finance in Indonesia.
Legend:

Independent Masyumi PNI PSI Catholic Golkar PAN
No	Photo	Name	Cabinet	Took office	Left office	Ref.
1		Samsi Sastrawidagda	Presidential	2 September 1945	26 September 1945	
2		Alexander Andries Maramis	Presidential	26 September 1945	14 November 1945	
3		Sunarjo Kolopaking	Sjahrir I	14 November 1945	5 December 1945	
4		Surachman Tjokroadisurjo	Sjahrir I	8 December 1945	12 March 1946	
4		Surachman Tjokroadisurjo	Sjahrir II	12 March 1946	2 October 1946	
5		Sjafruddin Prawiranegara	Sjahrir III	2 October 1946	26 June 1947	
(2)		Alexander Andries Maramis	Amir Sjarifuddin I	3 July 1947	11 November 1947	
(2)		Alexander Andries Maramis	Amir Sjarifuddin II	11 November 1947	29 January 1948	
(2)		Alexander Andries Maramis	Hatta I	29 January 1948	4 August 1949	
6		Lukman Hakim	Emergency	19 December 1948	13 July 1949	
6		Lukman Hakim	Hatta II	4 August 1949	20 December 1949	
(5)		Sjafruddin Prawiranegara	RIS	20 December 1949	6 September 1950	
(6)		Lukman Hakim	Susanto	20 December 1949	21 January 1950	
(6)		Lukman Hakim	Halim	21 January 1950	6 September 1950	
(5)		Sjafruddin Prawiranegara	Natsir	6 September 1950	27 April 1951	
7		Jusuf Wibisono	Sukiman	27 April 1951	3 April 1952	
8		Sumitro Djojohadikusumo	Wilopo	3 April 1952	30 July 1953	
9		Ong Eng Die	Ali Sastroamidjojo I	30 July 1953	12 August 1955	
(8)		Sumitro Djojohadikusumo	Burhanuddin Harahap	12 August 1955	24 March 1956	
(7)		Jusuf Wibisono	Ali Sastroamidjojo II	24 March 1956	9 April 1957	
10		Sutikno Slamet	Djuanda	9 April 1957	10 July 1959	
11		Djuanda Kartawidjaja	Working I	10 July 1959	18 February 1960	
11		Djuanda Kartawidjaja	Working II (Note: There were two ministers of finance in this cabinet. By the Presidential Decree No. 208 of 1960, Sukarno relieved Djuanda from his position as Minister of Finance.)	18 February 1960	1 July 1960	
12		Notohamiprodjo	Working II	18 February 1960	6 March 1962	
12		Notohamiprodjo	Working III (Note: As Coordinating Minister of Finance.)	6 March 1962	13 November 1963	
13		Soemarno	Working IV (Note: As Coordinating Minister for the Financial Compartment.)	13 November 1963	27 August 1964	
13		Soemarno	Dwikora I	27 August 1964	24 February 1966	
13		Soemarno	Dwikora II	24 February 1966	28 March 1966	
13		Soemarno	Dwikora III (Note: Renamed back to Minister of Finance.)	28 March 1966	25 July 1966	
14		Frans Seda	Ampera I	25 July 1966	17 October 1967	
14		Frans Seda	Ampera II	17 October 1967	6 June 1968	
15		Ali Wardhana	Development I	6 June 1968	28 March 1973	
15		Ali Wardhana	Development II	28 March 1973	29 March 1978	
15		Ali Wardhana	Development III	29 March 1978	19 March 1983	
16		Radius Prawiro	Development IV	19 March 1983	11 March 1988	
17		Johannes Baptista Sumarlin	Development V	21 March 1988	11 March 1993	
18		Marie Muhammad	Development VI	17 March 1993	11 March 1998	
19		Fuad Bawazier	Development VII	16 March 1998	21 May 1998	
20		Bambang Subianto	Development Reform	23 May 1998	20 October 1999	
21		Bambang Sudibyo	National Unity	26 October 1999	23 August 2000	
22		Prijadi Praptosuhardjo	National Unity	23 August 2000	12 June 2001	
23		Rizal Ramli	National Unity	12 June 2001	9 August 2001	
24		Boediono	Mutual Assistance	9 August 2001	20 October 2004	
25		Jusuf Anwar	United Indonesia I	21 October 2004	7 December 2005	
26		Sri Mulyani	United Indonesia I	7 December 2005	20 October 2009	
26		Sri Mulyani	United Indonesia II	22 October 2009	20 May 2010	
27		Agus Martowardojo	United Indonesia II	20 May 2010	19 April 2013	
—		Hatta Rajasa (acting)	United Indonesia II	19 April 2013	21 May 2013	
28		Muhammad Chatib Basri	United Indonesia II	21 May 2013	20 October 2014	
29		Bambang Brodjonegoro	Working	27 October 2014	27 July 2016	
(26)		Sri Mulyani	Working	27 July 2016	20 October 2019	
(26)		Sri Mulyani	Onward	23 October 2019	20 October 2024	
(26)		Sri Mulyani	Red and White	21 October 2024	8 September 2025	
30		Purbaya Yudhi Sadewa	Red and White	8 September 2025	14 September 2026	
31		Suahasil Nazara	Red and White	14 September 2026	Incumbent	
