= Sri Mulyani =

Indonesian economist and politician (born 1962)

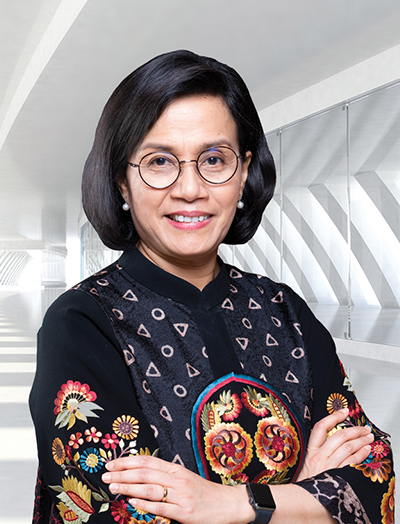
- Official portrait, 2021

26th Minister of Finance
- In office 27 July 2016 – 8 September 2025
- President: Joko Widodo; Prabowo Subianto
- Preceded by: Bambang Brodjonegoro
- Succeeded by: Purbaya Yudhi Sadewa
- In office 7 December 2005 – 20 May 2010
- President: Susilo Bambang Yudhoyono
- Preceded by: Jusuf Anwar
- Succeeded by: Agus Martowardojo

Managing Director of the World Bank Group
- In office 1 June 2010 – 27 July 2016
- President: Robert Zoellick; Jim Yong Kim
- Preceded by: Juan José Daboub
- Succeeded by: Kyle Peters (Acting)

Coordinating Minister for Economic Affairs
- Acting
- In office 13 June 2008 – 20 October 2009
- President: Susilo Bambang Yudhoyono
- Preceded by: Boediono
- Succeeded by: Hatta Rajasa

Minister of National Development Planning
- In office 21 October 2004 – 5 December 2005
- President: Susilo Bambang Yudhoyono
- Preceded by: Kwik Kian Gie
- Succeeded by: Paskah Suzetta

Personal details
- Born: Sri Mulyani Indrawati; 26 August 1962 (age 64) Tanjung Karang (now Bandar Lampung), Indonesia
- Party: Independent
- Spouse: Tonny Sumartono (m. 1988)
- Education: University of Indonesia (BA); University of Illinois, Urbana-Champaign (MS, PhD)
- Scientific career
- Fields: Public finance
- Workplaces: University of Indonesia Georgia State University Blavatnik School of Government
- Thesis: Measuring the labor supply effect of income taxation using a life-cycle labor supply model: A case of Indonesia (1992)
- Doctoral advisor: Jane H Leuthold

Sri Mulyani Indrawati (born 26 August 1962) is an Indonesian economist who served as minister of finance from 2016 to 2025 under President Joko Widodo and Prabowo Subianto. She also served in the role under President Susilo Bambang Yudhoyono between 2005–2010.

In her first tenure, she was credited with strengthening Indonesia's economy, increasing investments, and steering Southeast Asia's largest economy through the 2008 financial crisis and the Great Recession. However, she was widely criticized for supporting a bailout of Bank Century in 2008, which cost the government Rp6.76 trillion ($737 million in 2008), resulting in the Indonesian House of Representatives holding a non-confidence vote on the bailout warrant. She resigned her post in 2010 and took a position at the World Bank as Managing Director, before returning as finance minister in 2016.

Sri Mulyani became the first person who served as a Minister of Finance in Indonesia under three different successive presidents: Susilo Bambang Yudhoyono, Joko Widodo, and finally Prabowo Subianto. She enjoyed high popularity following her reappointment in Widodo's administration, including being listed as The World's 100 Most Powerful Women by Forbes for several times, but she later garnered criticism for her budgeting and tax policy. During August-September 2025 protests, Sri Mulyani's home in South Tangerang became the target of looting by the mobs. On 8 September 2025, she was replaced as finance minister by Purbaya Yudhi Sadewa.

== Biography ==
=== Early life and education ===
Sri Mulyani was born in Tanjung Karang (now called Bandar Lampung) in Lampung, Sumatra, on 26 August 1962. She is the seventh child of university lecturers professor Satmoko and Retno Sriningsih. Her brothers were Agus Purwadianto, Nanang Untung Cahyono, Nunung Teguh Trianung, and Soetopo Patria Jati. Her sisters were Asri Purwanti, Nining Triastuti Soesilo, Atik Umiatun Hayati, Sri Harsi Teteki, and Retno Wahyuningsih.

Sri Mulyani obtained a BA in Economics from the University of Indonesia in 1986. She then attended the University of Illinois at Urbana-Champaign, where she received a MSc in Policy Economics in 1990 and a PhD in economics in 1992. In 1994 and 1995, she worked as and expert for the Economic Planning Agency. In 1996 and 1997, she was a program director of the Master Program on Planning and Public Policy at the University of Indonesia. From 1998 to 2001, she was a lecturer in economics at the University of Indonesia. In 2001, Sri Mulyani moved Atlanta, Georgia, to serve as a consultant with the United States Agency for International Development for programs to strengthen Indonesia's autonomy. In 2002, she lectured on the Indonesian economy as a visiting professor at the Andrew Young School of Policy Studies at Georgia State University. From 2002 to 2004, she was an executive director on the board of the International Monetary Fund representing 12 economies in Southeast Asia.

== Career ==
=== First term as finance minister (2005) ===
Sri Mulyani was first appointed Minister of Finance in 2005 by President Susilo Bambang Yudhoyono. One of her first acts was to fire 150 corrupt tax and customs officers in the finance department and penalize another 2,000 officers. She successfully reduced political corruption and initiated reforms in Indonesia's tax and customs office. She also revised incentive structures for civil servants in her ministry and began paying higher salaries to tax officials deemed to be "clean" so they would have less temptation to accept bribes. Indonesia attracted $8.9 billion in foreign direct investment in 2005, Sri Mulyani's first year as finance minister, a significant increase from $4.6 billion in 2004.

In 2006, she was named Euromoney Finance Minister of the Year by Euromoney magazine. In September 2006, Emerging Markets selected Sri Mulyani as the Asia Finance Minister of The Year.

In 2007, Indonesia recorded 6.6% economic growth, its highest rate since the 1997 Asian financial crisis. In July 2008, Sri Mulyani was inaugurated as the Coordinating Minister for the economy, replacing Boediono, who was to head Bank Indonesia.

Growth in 2008 was 6% despite the Great Recession. By January 2009, public debt was reduced to 30% of gross domestic product from 100% in 1999, making it easier for Indonesia to sell debt to foreign institutional investors.

=== Bank Century bailout and criminal accusations (2008) ===
Golkar, the party that controlled the legislature, accused Mulyani of criminality in the bailout of Bank Century during the 2008 financial crisis. Critics of the bailout claimed it was done without legal authority and without proving that a capital injection was needed to prevent a run on other banks. The bailout cost the state close to 6.7 trillion rupiah ($710 million). Sri Mulyani defended the bailout as necessary and denied any wrongdoing. The allegations could have resulted in impeachment charges.

Criticism on Sri Mulyani's policy also came from then-Vice President of Indonesia Jusuf Kalla. He denied claims by former Bank Indonesia officials that if the lender had been allowed to fail, there would have been a systemic impact on the country's banking system and economy.

All nine factions in the House of Representatives special committee agreed that there were suspicious and possibly fraudulent transactions and evidence of money laundering as a result of the bailout, alleging that preventing such fraud was the responsibility of the Indonesian National Police and Corruption Eradication Commission (KPK).

After Susilo Bambang Yudhoyono was re-elected in the 2009 Indonesian presidential election in July 2009, Sri Mulyani was re-appointed in her post of Finance Minister. In 2009, the Indonesian economy grew by 4.5% despite the Great Recession affecting most of the world economies. Along with India and China, Indonesia was one of just three major emerging economies to grow faster than 4% in 2009. Under the supervision of Sri Mulyani, the government increased the number of income taxpayers from 4.35 million in 2005 to nearly 16 million individuals in 2010, and tax receipts grew by around 20% each year to more than Rp 600 trillion in 2010.

In May 2014, Sri Mulyani testified at a trial related to the Century Bank bailout, where she reiterated that she believed that the bailout was a good decision.

=== Resignation and move to the World Bank (2010) ===
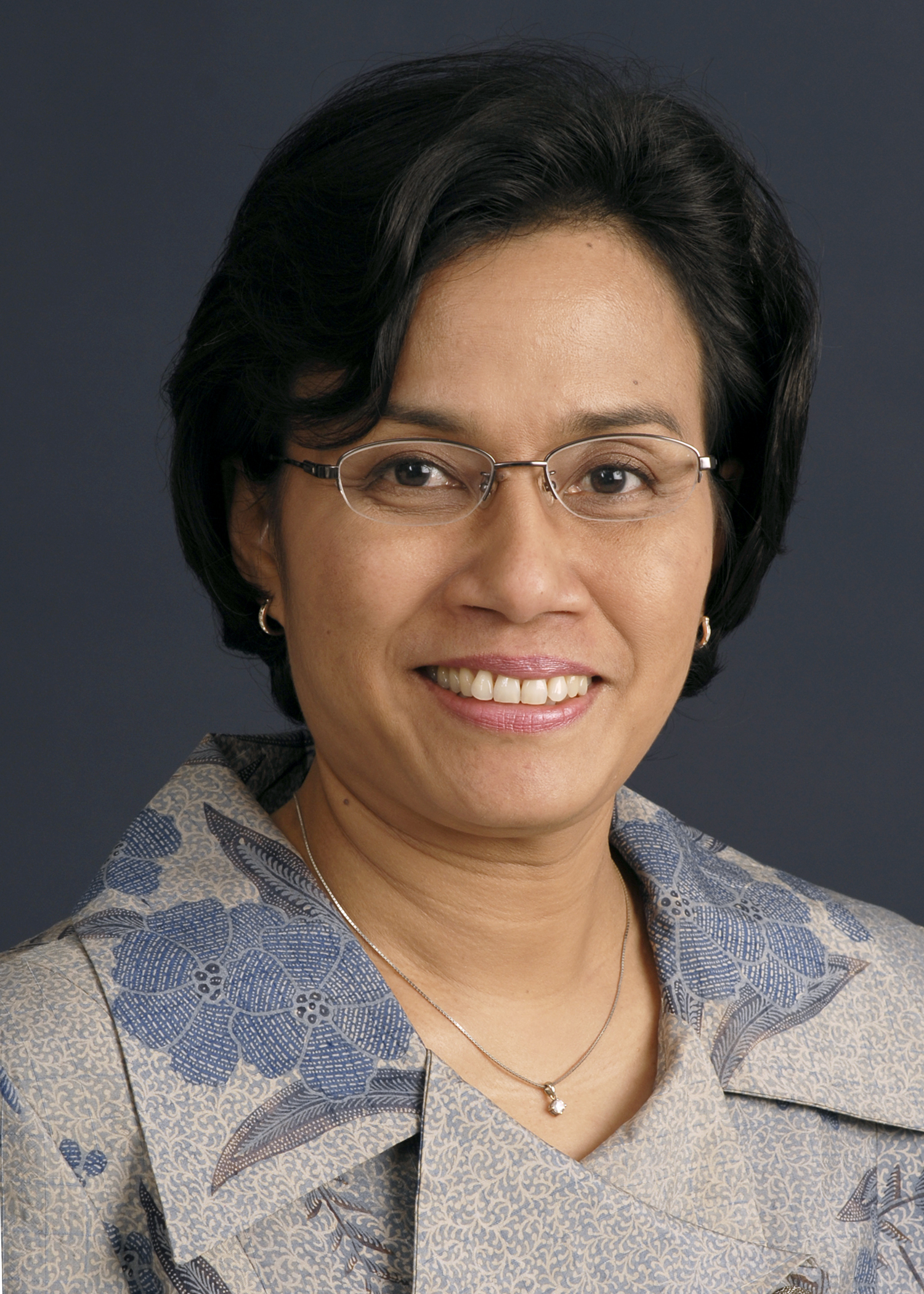
Sri Mulyani as managing director of the World Bank Group (2010)

On 5 May 2010, Sri Mulyani was appointed one of three managing directors of the World Bank, replacing Juan Jose Daboub who had stepped down after 4 years of his term on 30 June, responsible to work in 74 countries in South America, Caribbean, Eastern Asia–Pacific, Middle East, and North Africa.

Mulyani resigned as finance minister in May 2010. Her resignation was viewed negatively; the Indonesia Stock Exchange closed down 3.8% after the news, amid a broad selloff in Asia, while the Indonesian rupiah fell nearly 1% against the dollar. The drop in Indonesian stock exchange was the sharpest in 17 months.

There was widespread speculation that her resignation was due to political pressure, especially from Aburizal Bakrie, a powerful tycoon and leader of Golkar. Bakrie had enmity toward Sri Mulyani due to her investigation into tax fraud by the Bakrie Group, her refusal to prop up Bakrie's coal interests using government funds, and her refusal to declare the Sidoarjo mud flow, which was caused by drilling by Bakrie's company, as a "natural disaster".

On 20 May 2010, President Susilo Bambang Yudhoyono named Agus Martowardojo, CEO of Bank Mandiri, the largest bank in Indonesia, as her replacement.

=== Alleged hacking by Australian intelligence (2013) ===
In November 2013, The Guardian published articles based on leaks by Edward Snowden that showed the Australian Intelligence Community had hacked into the mobile phones of top Indonesian leaders in 2009. This included Sri Mulyani, who at that time was the minister of finance. Prime Minister of Australia Tony Abbott defended the actions, saying that the activities were not so much "spying" as "research" and that its intention would always be to use any information "for good".

=== Reappointment as finance minister (2016–2025) ===
In 2016, Sri Mulyani was reappointed finance minister. From 2017 to 2019, Sri Mulyani was named the best finance minister in the Asia-Pacific region three years in a row by FinanceAsia. In 2018, Indonesia recorded its smallest budget deficit since 2012.

In February 2020, Sri Mulyani announced a 10.3 trillion rupiah economic stimulus package to mitigate the effects of the COVID-19 recession. In April 2020, during the COVID-19 pandemic, Sri Mulyani released a global bond series with a 50-year maturity, the longest loan offered in Indonesian history. In 2021, after the enactment of Presidential Decree No. 78/2021, she became one of the Vice Heads of the National Research and Innovation Agency Steering Committee, together with Suharso Monoarfa.

On 20 October 2024, Sri Mulyani was reappointed Minister of Finance by President Prabowo Subianto for 3rd consecutive term, ending in 2029, making her the first woman to hold the position under three presidential administrations. Following the August 2025 Indonesian protests, she was dismissed as finance minister by Prabowo on 8 September.

== Personal life ==
Sri Mulyani married economist Tonny Sumartono in 1988, with whom she has three children. She is a professional economist and has no political affiliation. Mulyani considers herself a role model for women.

Sri Mulyani's residence was looted during the August 2025 Indonesian protests on 31 August.

== Honours ==
- Indonesia:
  - Star of Mahaputera (2nd Class) (Indonesian: Bintang Mahaputera Adipradana) (10 August 2011)

== Bibliography ==
- Keeping Indonesia Safe from the COVID-19 Pandemic: Lessons Learnt from the National Economic Recovery Programme (2022) – editor

Political offices
Preceded by Kwik Kian Gie	Minister for National Development Planning; 2004–2005	Succeeded by Paskah Suzetta
Preceded by Kwik Kian Gie	Chair of the National Development Planning Agency; 2004–2005	Succeeded by Paskah Suzetta
Preceded by Jusuf Anwar	Minister of Finance; 2005–2010	Succeeded by Agus Martowardojo
Preceded by Boediono	Coordinating Minister for the Economy; Acting; 2008–2009	Succeeded by Hatta Rajasa
Preceded by Bambang Brodjonegoro	Minister of Finance; 2016–2025	Succeeded by Purbaya Yudhi Sadewa
Diplomatic posts
Preceded by Juan José Daboub	Managing Director of the World Bank Group; 2010–2016	Succeeded by Kyle Peters; Acting
