= Bambang Subianto =

Indonesian economist and politician (1945–2022)

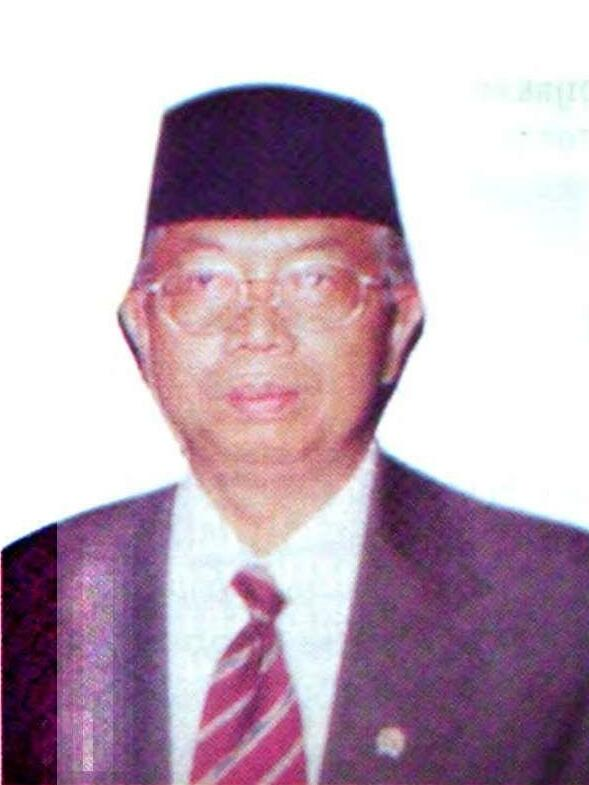
- Subianto in 1998

Minister of Finance
- In office 23 May 1998 – 20 October 1999
- President: B. J. Habibie
- Preceded by: Fuad Bawazier
- Succeeded by: Bambang Sudibyo

Personal details
- Born: 10 January 1945 Madiun Regency, Japanese-occupied Dutch East Indies
- Died: 4 November 2022 (aged 77) Jakarta, Indonesia
- Party: Independent
- Education: Bandung Institute of Technology
- Occupation: Economist

Bambang Subianto (10 January 1945 – 4 November 2022) was an Indonesian academic and technocrat who served as Minister of Finance from 1998 to 1999. Before assuming the post of finance minister, Bambang worked in the Department of Finance for about a decade.

== Early life and education ==
Bambang was born on 10 January 1945 in Madiun during the Japanese occupation of the Dutch East Indies. Upon finishing his high school education, Bambang enrolled at the Bandung Institute of Technology (ITB), where he studied chemical engineering. He graduated with an undergraduate degree in 1973. Five years later, Bambang went to KU Leuven in Belgium for his postgraduate studies in business administration and doctorate in economics. He obtained his postgraduate and doctoral degrees in 1981 and 1984, respectively.

== Career ==
Two years after graduating from ITB, Bambang started his career in the Faculty of Economics of the University of Indonesia (UI) as a researcher and lecturer. He continued his stint in the university upon returning to Indonesia. Bambang became the chairman of the management institute of the faculty in 1988 after becoming the deputy chairman for about a year. Aside from his job in the university, Bambang was also active in the Union of Indonesian Engineers, where he was elected as one of its chairmen.

Bambang left the university and joined the Department of Finance in 1988; he was subsequently appointed as the director for financial institutions and accounting. He later briefly served as the minister's expert staff before being promoted to the post of the director general of financial institutions in 1992. During his tenure as director general, Bambang was heavily involved in the formulation of financial acts such as the Banking Act of 1992, Capital Market Act of 1995, and Non-tax Retribution Act of 1997.

During the Asian financial crisis, the Indonesian government under Suharto signed an agreement with the International Monetary Fund. One of the results of the agreement was the establishment of the Indonesian Bank Restructuring Agency (IBRA), which was set up to promote the recovery of Indonesia's economy through the segregation of bad debts. Bambang was appointed as its first chair in January 1998. Two months later, in March 1998, Bambang was dismissed from IBRA and the control of IBRA was subsequently transferred from the Department of Finance to Bank Indonesia. He was fired from his job as director general in March 1998 by minister of finance Fuad Bawazier. At that time, Fuad was known as a nationalist finance minister and had alienated monetary fund officials and foreign investors. Bambang subsequently returned to UI to resume his old job.

== Minister of Finance ==
On 22 May 1998, Bambang, who was returning home after providing a studium generale to students in the Bandung Institute of Technology, was announced by President B. J. Habibie as the finance minister in the Development Reform Cabinet. He was installed as minister along with other members of the cabinet a day later. Upon his inauguration, Bambang, alongside four other ministers from the economics compartment, promised that they would resign if there were no fundamental changes in economics and politics within three months.

Suara Karya compared Bambang's appointment to Kuntoro Mangkusubroto, who had previously served as director general in the department of mines and energy under the previous cabinet and was fired by minister Ida Bagus Sudjana, but was appointed to replace Sudjana.

Habibie's choice to appoint a chemical engineering undergraduate from ITB for the finance minister post was motivated by his goal to implement his own version of economics. He distrusted economists from UI, who were mostly subordinates of Widjojo Nitisastro, the economics minister of the previous Suharto regime.

During his tenure as finance minister, Bambang, along with the Governor of Bank Indonesia Syahril Sabirin, was involved in transferring Bank Indonesia from under the Department of Finance to directly under the president. The move allowed the stabilization of the rupiah exchange rate, which was previously around 18,000 Indonesian rupiah per one United States dollar to 6,500 Indonesian rupiah.

In August 1999, a scandal involving $US78 million siphoned off from Bank Bali was revealed through the purported transcript of a police interview with former Bank Bali president Rudy Ramli. Ramli named several high-profile Indonesian government officials, including Bambang. As a result, there were calls to dismiss Bambang from his post. Bambang was eventually dismissed as financial minister and was replaced by Bambang Sudibyo.

== Later life and death ==
After ending his term as minister, Bambang joined various private companies, where he either become a member of the board or President Commissioner. He joined Ernst & Young as a partner in July 2000, and retired in 2005. In 2009 he became the head of Arghajata Consulting, a company engaged in management consulting services, in addition to serving as board member in various companies, including Star Energy Investments (2008–2011), Unilever Indonesia (2008–2015), and Jamsostek (2009–2014). Bambang was also nominated as the president director of the state oil company Pertamina in January 2000.

Subianto died in Jakarta on 4 November 2022, at age 77.
