= Development Reform Cabinet =

Indonesian cabinet under B. J. Habibie (1998–1999)

Development Reform Cabinet Kabinet Reformasi Pembangunan
- 35th Cabinet of Indonesia
- 1998–1999
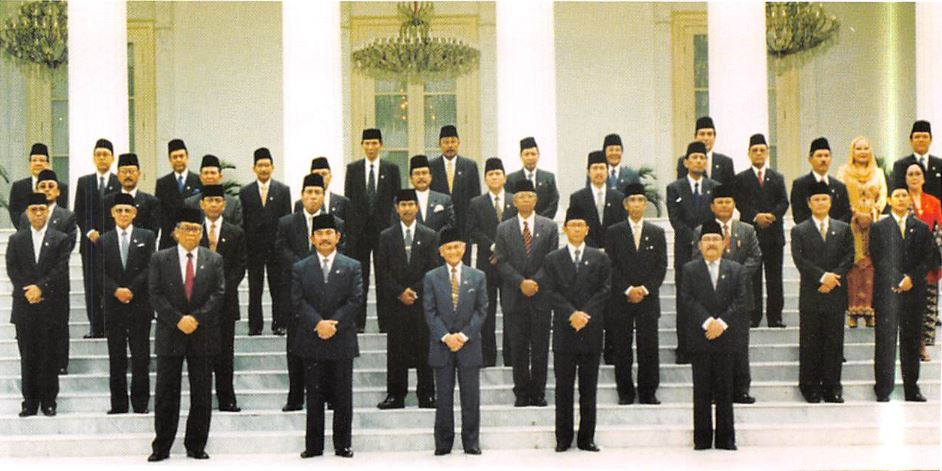
- President Bacharuddin Jusuf Habibie (front row, centre) with the newly cabinet in front of the Istana Merdeka, 23 May 1998
- Date formed: 23 May 1998
- Date dissolved: 20 October 1999

People and organisations
- Head of government: Bacharuddin Jusuf Habibie
- No. of ministers: 36
- Member parties: Functional Groups; Indonesian Armed Forces; Indonesian Democratic Party; United Development Party
- Status in legislature: National unity government 500 / 500

History
- Outgoing election: 1999 Indonesian legislative election 1999 Indonesian presidential election
- Predecessor: Development VII Cabinet
- Successor: National Unity Cabinet

B. J. Habibie's address
President Bacharuddin Jusuf Habibie announcing the formation of the Development Reform Cabinet, 22 May 1998.

The Development Reform Cabinet (Indonesian: Kabinet Reformasi Pembangunan) was the Indonesian cabinet which served under President B. J. Habibie during his term as president from 23 May 1998 to 20 October 1999.

Despite having the word "Reform" as part of its name, the Development Reform Cabinet consisted mostly of the names which had served in Suharto's Seventh Development Cabinet. There were however some reformist actions taken with the line up of this cabinet. The governor of the central bank and the attorney general were originally left out of the cabinet as part of Habibie's desire to make the two positions independent of executive control. Habibie was successful in giving the governor of the central bank independent authority, although he would continue to retain control of the attorney general. Another reformist step taken was the inclusion of United Development Party member and future chairman Hamzah Haz instead of keeping the cabinet exclusive to Golkar and members of the Indonesian National Armed Forces.

== President ==
President
Bacharuddin Jusuf Habibie

== Coordinating ministers ==
- Coordinating Minister of Politics and Security: Gen. (ret.) Feisal Tanjung
- Coordinating Minister of Economics, Finance, and Industry: Ginandjar Kartasasmita
- Coordinating Minister of Development Supervision and State Apparatus Utilization: Hartarto Sastrosoenarto
- Coordinating Minister of People's Welfare and Abolition of Poverty: Haryono Suyono

== Departmental ministers ==
- Minister of Home Affairs: Lt. Gen. Syarwan Hamid
- Minister of Foreign Affairs: Ali Alatas
- Minister of Defense and Security/Commander of the Armed Forces: Gen. Wiranto
- Minister of Justice: Muladi
- Minister of Information: Lt. Gen. Yunus Yosfiah
- Minister of Finance: Bambang Subianto
- Minister of Industry and Trade: Rahardi Ramelan
- Minister of Agriculture: Soleh Solahuddin
- Minister of Mines and Energy: Kuntoro Mangkusubroto
- Minister of Forestry and Plantation: Muslimin Nasution
- Minister of Public Works: Rachmadi Bambang Sumadhijo
- Minister of Transportation: Giri Suseno Harihardjono
- Minister of Tourism, Arts, and Culture: Marzuki Usman
- Minister of Cooperatives, Small and Medium Businesses: Adi Sasono
- Minister of Manpower: Fahmi Idris
- Minister of Transmigration and Forest Settlement: Lt. Gen. Abdullah Mahmud Hendropriyono
- Minister of Education and Culture: Juwono Sudarsono
- Minister of Health: Farid Anfasa Moeloek
- Minister of Social Affairs: Justika Baharsjah

== State ministers ==
- State Minister/State Secretary: Akbar Tanjung
- State Minister of Research and Technology/Chairman of Research and Implementation of Technology Board (BPPT): M. Zuhal
- State Minister of Investment/Chairman of the Investment Coordinating Body (BKPM): Hamzah Haz
- State Minister of Agrarian Affairs/Chairman of the National Land Body (BPN): Hasan Basri Durin
- State Minister of Housing and Settlement: Theo L. Sambuaga
- State Minister of Environment: Panangian Siregar
- State Minister of State-Owned Enterprises: Tanri Abeng
- State Minister of Planning and National Development/Chairman of National Development Planning Body (BAPPENAS): Boediono
- State Minister of Female Empowerment: Tutty Alawiyah
- State Minister of Youth and Sports: Agung Laksono
- State Minister of Foodstuffs and Horticulture: A. M. Saefuddin
- State Minister of Population/Chairman of Planned Families National Coordinating Body (BKKBN): Ida Bagus Oka

== Official with ministerial rank ==
- Attorney General: Sudjono C. Atmanegara

== Changes ==
- 15 June 1998: Sudjono C. Atmanegara replaced by Maj. Gen. Andi Muhammad Ghalib as Attorney General.
- May 1999: Hamzah Haz stepped down as State Minister of Investment/Chairman of BKPM and his position was taken over by Marzuki Uzman.
- May 1999: Akbar Tanjung stepped down as State Minister/State Secretary and his position was taken over by Muladi.

== See also ==
- Bacharuddin Jusuf Habibie
- 1999 East Timorese independence referendum
- Bank Bali scandal
