= Artidjo Alkostar =

Indonesian lawyer, judge, and legal academic (1948–2021)

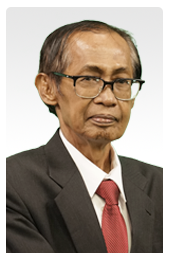

Corruption Eradication Commission Advisory Board
- In office 20 December 2019 – 28 February 2021
- President: Joko Widodo
- Succeeded by: Indriyanto Seno Adji

Supreme Court of Indonesia
- In office 2 September 2000 – 1 June 2018
- Appointed by: Abdurrahman Wahid

Personal details
- Born: 22 May 1948 Situbondo, Indonesia
- Died: 28 February 2021 (aged 72) Jakarta, Indonesia
- Spouse: Sri Widyaningsih
- Education: Islamic University of Indonesia; Northwestern University
- Occupation: advocate, judge, academic

Artidjo Alkostar (22 May 1948 – 28 February 2021) was an Indonesian lawyer, judge and legal academic. He served as a Supreme Court Judge and Chairman of the Criminal Chamber of the Supreme Court of the Republic of Indonesia, where he was famous for his verdicts that tended to increase sentences for convicted corruption cases and the dissenting opinions he issued in several major cases. At the end of his life, he served as a member of the supervisory board of the Corruption Eradication Commission for the period of 2019–2023.

== Early life and education ==
Artidjo Alkostar was born in Situbondo, East Java. His father and mother were both from Sumenep, Madura. Artidjo earned a law degree (S.H.) at the Faculty of Law at Universitas Islam Indonesia, Yogyakarta in 1976 and a master's degree (LL.M.) at Northwestern University, Chicago, United States in 2002. At Northwestern, Artidjo wrote a dissertation on Human Rights Court in the Indonesian justice system. He underwent training as a human rights lawyer at Columbia University for six months.

== Career ==
Artidjo Alkostar's career in law began in 1976. Initially, he was a lecturer at the Faculty of Law at Universitas Islam Indonesia at Yogyakarta. In 1981, he became part of the Yogyakarta Legal Aid Institute, serving as deputy director from 1981 to 1983 and director from 1983 to 1989. At the same time, he worked for two years at the Asia division of Human Rights Watch in New York. After returning from the US, he established a law firm, Artidjo Alkostar and Associates, until 2000, when he was elected as Supreme Court Justice of the Republic of Indonesia.

While he was a lawyer, Artidjo handled risky cases. He was a legal advisor for the Komando Jihad case, the Petrus killings in Yogyakarta, the Santa Cruz case in East Timor, the murder case of journalist Bernas Muhammad Syafruddin (Udin), and the head of the defense team for the 1997 Election Fraud lawsuit in Pamekasan, Madura.

=== Supreme Court ===
Artidjo Alkostar started his career as a supreme judge in 2000, and retired on 22 May 2018. During his 18 years of service, he completed 19,708 case files at the Supreme Court. He handled various major cases, such as the case of the Hambalang sports center project, the bribery case of meat imports, and the bribery case of the chairman of the Constitutional Court.

Artidjo's became a prominent Supreme Court justice when he disagreed with two other judges in the case of former President Suharto and the Bank Bali scandal with defendant Djoko Soegiarto Tjandra. In the Djoko Tjandra case, he concluded that the defendant was guilty, sentencing him to 20 years, although two other chief justices acquitted him. The verdict of the case introduced a dissenting opinion from Artidjo which gave Artidjo prominence. While joking, he added that he had made progress, because when he was a lawyer he often lost cases because he did not give bribes to judges and prosecutors. He often of gave additional sentences in corruption cases.

During the sexual assault scandal at Jakarta Intercultural School (JIS), Artidjo also overturned the lower court's decision in freeing two teachers Neil Bantleman and Ferdinand Tjong who were found sexually assaulting kids at the school's premise, and increased their prison sentence to 11 years.

== Personal life ==
Artidjo married Sri Widyaningsih in 1998 or 1999.

Artidjo never intended to have a career in law, instead intending to major in the sciences in the Faculty of Agriculture. When he wanted to register for the Faculty of Agriculture it had closed so he enrolled at the Faculty of Law at the Islamic University of Indonesia to fill time until the registration opened the next year. After a year he decided to continue pursuing law.

Artidjo had published several books, titled "Artidjo Alkostar Titian Keikhlasan", "Berkhidmat untuk Keadilan," "Dimensi Filosofis Ilmu Hukum dan hukum Pidana (70 Tahun Artidjo Alkostar Mengabdi Kepada Bangsa dan Negara)," and "Alkostar Sebuah Biografi yang ditulis oleh Puguh Windrawan."

=== Death ===
Artidjo died on Sunday, 28 February 2021 in Jakarta, complications with lung, heart, and kidney disease were believed to be the cause of his death. This complication was said to have been around for a long time.
