= Rachmadi Bambang Sumadhijo =

Indonesian engineer and bureaucrat (1940–2024)

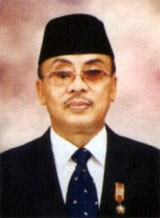
- Sumadhijo in 1998

Minister of Public Works
- In office 14 March 1998 – 20 October 1999
- President: Suharto; B. J. Habibie
- Preceded by: Radinal Mochtar
- Succeeded by: Rozik Boedioro Soetjipto

Personal details
- Born: 11 October 1940 Surakarta, Dutch East Indies
- Died: 4 December 2024 (aged 84) Jakarta, Indonesia
- Spouse: Rukminiadi
- Children: 3
- Education: Bandung Institute of Technology
- Occupation: Engineer; bureaucrat

Rachmadi Bambang Sumadhijo (11 October 1940 – 4 December 2024) was an Indonesian engineer and bureaucrat who served as the Minister of Public Works between 1998 and 1999.

Born in Surakarta, Sumadhijo began his career as a public works department employee shortly after graduating from college. His career rose quickly from a project chief to director general of city planning and construction. He oversaw grants and water management in his capacity as director general and struck a controversial deal with President Suharto's daughter. Suharto then appointed him as public works minister in his last cabinet. He resigned from the position two months later and was reappointed by Suharto's successor, B. J. Habibie.

== Early life and education ==
Rachmadi Bambang Sumadhijo was born in Surakarta on 11 October 1940. His father worked as an employee at the Madiun's Information Service. Upon completing high school, he began studying civil engineering at the Bandung Institute of Technology in 1959. He graduated from the institute in 1964. Throughout his career in the Department of Public Works, Sumadhijo attended various courses, such as a course of project management in Washington in 1977 and a course at the National Resilience Institute in 1990.

== Career ==
Sumadhijo began his career as a road construction staff at the Department of Public Works on 1 May 1964. His career in the department gradually rose. He was appointed the chief of transit in the Kalimantan Road Project in 1967 and the chief of bridge construction works in Riau in 1967. By 1976, he was responsible for all engineering projects in the Directorate General of Road Construction.

Sumadhijo was posted in Jakarta in 1977 with his appointment as the chief of planning in the Directorate General of Road Construction. His office was elevated a year later, making him responsible directly to the director general of road construction. He was later appointed to various directorships in the Directorate General of Road Construction, namely as the director of road construction (1983–1984), director of central planning (1984–1985), and director of program supervision (1985–1989). He was then promoted as expert staff for human resources to public works minister Radinal Mochtar.

=== Director general for city planning and construction ===
Three years later, in 1991 Radinal appointed Sumadhijo as the director general for city planning and construction, responsible for city planning and development, housing, and drinking water supply. In his position, Sumadhijo handled the grants from other countries for city construction and the gradual handover of clean water management to regional government in East Java and in Buleleng. He also signed a controversial contract with the Citra Group, a group of companies owned by President Suharto's daughter Siti Hardiyanti Rukmana, which resulted in the investment of 290 million rupiahs to a water distribution project in West Jakarta and 300 million for a similar project in the eastern part of Jakarta. The directorate general also attempted to reduce the leak of mineral water distribution, with Sumadhijo urging local water companies under the regional governments not to burden water company users with rising costs.

Aside from water management, in 1997 the directorate general under Sumadhijo also supervised a pilot project to build simple rental apartments (rusun) for low-income communities. The project involves constructing a 10-story building in Pasar Jumat, South Jakarta.

=== Minister of Public Works ===
On 8 March 1998, Sumadhijo received a call from President Suharto regarding his appointment as Minister of Public Works. His name was publicly announced six days later as part of the Seventh Development Cabinet, in what would become Suharto's last cabinet. Sumadhijo announced that he would focus on addressing the then-ongoing economic crisis by creating job opportunities in the construction sector and prioritizing the maintenance and rehabilitation of essential infrastructure. In an interview with Solo Pos, Sumadhijo stated that the department would support the government's goal of increasing agricultural produce and the distribution of clothes through irrigation and roads, as well as increasing the amount of manpower involved in projects while maintaining quality.

In April 1998, Sumadhijo was instructed by President Suharto to construct a double-track railway in Java's North Coast Road from Jakarta to Surabaya–Banyuwangi. The project was delayed due to the unfavorable economic situation at that time. On 20 May, Sumadhijo along with thirteen other ministers collectively refused to join the new Reform Cabinet, effectively resigning. This mass rejection was initiated by Coordinating Minister for Economy, Finance, and Industry, Ginandjar Kartasasmita, and took place at the Bappenas building, where they signed a declaration known as the "Bappenas Declaration". The Suharto regime fell the next day and vice president B. J. Habibie assumed the presidency. Sumadhijo was later re-appointed for the same position in Habibie's Development Reform Cabinet.

== Personal life and death ==
Sumadhijo was married to physician Rukminiadi, with whom he had three children. On 4 December 2024, Sumadhijo died at the Pondok Indah Hospital in Jakarta, at the age of 84. His funeral was held at Tanah Kusir Public Cemetery in Jakarta, led by Minister of Public Works Dody Hanggodo.

== Awards ==
- Role Model Medal (17 August 1994)
- Star of Service, 1st Class (17 August 1995)
- Star of Mahaputera, 2nd Class (13 August 1999)

Government offices
Preceded by Radinal Mochtar	Minister of Public works 1998–1999	Succeeded by Rozik Boedioro Soetjipto
