= Presidential Delivery Unit for Development Monitoring and Oversight =

Presidential Delivery Unit for Development Monitoring and Oversight (officially called UKP-PPP, often also abbreviated as UKP4) was a work unit established by Indonesian President Susilo Bambang Yudhoyono to carry out specific tasks related to the smoothness of the fulfillment of the work program of Second United Indonesia Cabinet. Kuntoro Mangkusubroto served as head, whose appointment and inauguration were conducted simultaneously with Second United Indonesia Cabinet. UKP4 was formally established on December 8, 2009, based on Presidential Regulation No. 54 of 2009. UKP4 is a continuation of the work unit of the President of Program and Reform Management (UKP3R).

UKP4 was directly answerable to the president. In carrying out its duties, UKP4 is assisted by the Vice President and coordinates with-and obtains technical information and support from ministries, non-ministerial government agencies, local government, and other concerned parties.

UKP4 was officially dissolved by President Joko Widodo as of February 23, 2015 based on Presidential Regulation No. 26 of 2015 Article 40 paragraph b. that Some of the functions of this institution are merged into the Cabinet Secretariat and the Office of the Presidential Staff.
