= Djoko Tjandra =

Indonesian businessman and convicted felon

- 曾国辉
- Born: Tjan Kok Hui; 27 August 1951 (age 75); Sanggau, West Kalimantan, Indonesia
- Spouse: Anna Boentaran
- Children: 3
- Criminal charge: Corruption
- Penalty: 2 years

Chinese name
- Traditional Chinese: 曾國輝
- Simplified Chinese: 曾国辉
Transcriptions
Standard Mandarin
- Hanyu Pinyin: Zēng guóhuī

Djoko Soegiarto Tjandra (Note: AKA Tjan Kok Hui, Chan Kok Hin, or his alias Joe Chan. Chinese: see Chinese name and romanisation.) is an Indonesian businessman and convicted felon. He and his brothers founded the Mulia Group of companies. In 2009, he fled to Papua New Guinea one day before he was sentenced to jail for his role in the embezzlement of banking funds. After 11 years on the run, he was arrested in Malaysia in July 2020 and sent to Indonesia, where he was later jailed for bribing police and a public prosecutor.

== Early life and family ==
Tjandra was born on 27 August 1951 in Sanggau, West Kalimantan, to Tjandra Kusuma (father) and Ho Yauw Hiang (mother). He has seven siblings.

He is married to Anna Boentaran and they have three daughters: Joanne Soegiarto Tjandranegara, Jocelyne Soegiarto Tjandra and Jovita Soegiarto Tjandra.

== Business career ==
When he was 17, Tjandra traveled to Irian Jaya (now Papua province), where in 1968 he opened a grocery store named Toko Sama-Sama in the provincial capital, Jayapura. He opened a distribution business in Melbourne in 1974. In 1975, he founded PT Bersama Mulia, a contracting company, in Jakarta.

Three years later, as an expert for PT Jaya Supplies Indonesia, he gained projects from state oil company Pertamina, state electricity company PLN and the Industry Ministry. Over 1979–81, he developed Belawan power plant in North Sumatra, expanded an oil refinery in Balikpapan, developed a Hydrocracking Complex in Dumai, an oil refinery in Cilacap, and Kaltim fertilizer in Bontang, East Kalimantan.

In 1983, he entered the property sector, developing office blocks. Among his projects were Lippo Life building, Kuningan Plaza and BCA Plaza. He was also involved in the development of Mal Taman Anggrek, which was once the largest mall in Southeast Asia.

Tjandra was a key figure in the Mulia Group, which started as PT Mulialand, founded in the early 1970s by Tjandra Kusuma (Tjan Boen Hwa) and three of his children: Eka Tjandranegara (Tjan Kok Hui), Gunawan Tjandra (Tjan Kok Kwang) and Djoko Tjandra. Mulialand is involved in construction and property. The luxury properties it developed include Mulia Senayan Hotel, Wisma Mulia, Menara Mulia, Wisma GKBI, Menara Mulia Plaza 89, Plaza Kuningan, and Taman Anggrek apartments. On 5 November 1986, Mulia Industrindo, was founded. It has manufacturing subsidiaries in glass and ceramics.

== Bank Bali scandal and corruption conviction ==
On 11 February 1999, Tjandra attended a meeting at his Hotel Mulia in Jakarta to discuss efforts by Bank Bali to collect Rp904 billion owed by three banks taken over by the Indonesian Bank Restructuring Agency (IBRA). Tjandra was present in his capacity as director of Era Giat Prima, a company which collected a commission of Rp546 billion for IBRA releasing the funds. Some Rp274 billion of the commission money was transferred to Tjandra's account at BNI Kuningan, while part of the money was transferred to Indonesian officials and legislators.

After news of the "Baligate" scandal broke in late July 1999, Tjandra was investigated by the police and the Attorney General's Office. He was detained on 29 September 1999 and later placed under house arrest. He went on trial at South Jakarta District Court on 9 February 2000, charged with corruption for "arranging and engaging in illegal transactions". Prosecutors demanded an 18-month sentence, but he was acquitted on 6 March 2000, with the deputy presiding judge ruling the case should have been heard by a civil court.

On 31 March 2000, Jakarta High Court ordered South Jakarta District Court to examine and try Tjandra. He went back on trial in April 2000 and was acquitted on 28 August 2000. Judges said although the prosecutor's indictment of Tjandra's actions was proven legally, the action was not a criminal offense but a civil action. Prosecutors appealed to the Supreme Court, which upheld Tjandra's innocence in a ruling on 26 June 2001.

In October 2008, the Attorney General's Office filed for a Supreme Court judicial review of Tjandra's acquittal. The day before the verdict was handed down, Tjandra on 10 June 2009 flew on a chartered plane from Jakarta's Halim Perdanakusuma Airport to Port Moresby, Papua New Guinea. On 11 June 2009, the Supreme Court gave Tjandra a two-year prison sentence. He was later declared a fugitive.

In March 2016, Tjandra's wife Anna Boentaran visited Indonesia's Constitutional Court and applied for a judicial review of Article 263, Chapter 1, Law No.8 of 1981 on the Criminal Law Procedures Code (KUHAP). On 12 May 2016, the Constitutional Court granted her request, withdrawing the Criminal Code article that had allowed prosecutors to request a review of a court decision with permanent legal force.

After that decision, then-Attorney General Muhammad Prasetyo was called to a meeting by chief security minister Wiranto, who wanted him to study a recommendation to clear Tjandra from his legal entanglement. Prasetyo declined to arrange amnesty for Tjandra.

== Papua New Guinean citizenship ==
Djoko Tjandra visited Port Moresby on 27 February 2009 and was granted an APEC Business Travel Permit. On 21 October 2010 he was granted a three-year Working/Employment Resident Permit by the PNG Embassy in Jakarta. On 25 August 2011, he was granted Permanent Resident Permit by then Foreign Affairs Minister Ano Pala. In October 2011, he lodged an application for citizenship by naturalization. On 29 April 2012, he was granted PNG citizenship by Ano Pala, even though he did not meet constitutional requirements and his name was on the Interpol Red Notice Alert as a wanted fugitive.

On 4 May 2012, Tjandra received his first PNG passport. On 7 May 2012, he applied for another passport, which was issued under a new name as Joe Chan. He also changed his date of birth to 27 September 1963. Another PNG passport was issued to "Joe Chan" on 20 January 2014.

According to Interpol, he was in possession of an Azerbaijan passport, which was reported stolen on 24 June 2005.

== Return to Indonesia and arrest ==
On 29 June 2020, Indonesian Attorney General S.T. Burhanuddin said Tjandra had been in Indonesia for the past three months. He said Tjandra had on 8 June filed a case review against his conviction. Justice Minister Yasonna Laoly said immigration data showed no record of Tjandra returning to Indonesia. On 2 July 2020, Coordinating Minister for Political, Legal and Security Affairs Mahfud M.D. said he had ordered the Attorney General's Office to immediately arrest Tjandra. Mahfud later said police informed him that Tjandra's name had been taken off Interpol's list of fugitives in 2014 because the Indonesian Attorney General's Office had never requested an extension.

Tjandra managed to obtain an electronic identity card (e-KTP) issued on 8 June 2020 by South Grogol Village in Kebayoran Lama, South Jakarta. The card was used in the submission of his request for a judicial review of his two-year jail sentence. South Grogol Urban Village head Asep Subhandi said the card was issued within less than one hour, after he was contacted by Tjandra's lawyer on 3 June 2020. Tjandra was also issued with a new Indonesian passport on 23 June 2020.

Tjandra was scheduled to appear at South Jakarta District Court on 7 July 2020 for his case review hearing, but he did not show up. His lawyer, Anita Kolopaking, claimed he was in Kuala Lumpur, Malaysia, being treated for an undisclosed illness. Indonesian Immigration spokesman Arvin Gumilang insisted there was no record of Tjandra having flown to Malaysia. On 29 July 2020, South Jakarta District Court rejected Tjandra's case review request.

On 30 July 2020, Tjandra was arrested in Malaysia and sent back to Indonesia, after 11 years on the run. In August, he was sent to Jakarta's Salemaba jail to begin serving his sentence. Police named him a suspect for allegedly bribing police and document forgery.

=== Conspirators arrested, jailed ===
In July 2020, two police generals were removed from their posts for facilitating Tjandra's travel in Indonesia. National Police international relations division head Inspector General Napoleon Bonaparte was found to have violated ethics, while National Central Bureau (NCB)-Interpol Indonesia secretary Brigadier General Nugroho Wibowo had on 5 May 2020 sent a letter to Indonesian Immigration, stating the Interpol red notice against Djoko Tjandra was withdrawn, prompting Immigration to erase Tjandra's name from its watch-list.

Separately, Brigadier General Prasetyo Utomo, head of the Civil Servant Investigator Supervisory and Coordination Bureau at the Police Criminal Investigation Department, reportedly issued a travel letter on 18 June that enabled Tjandra to fly from Jakarta to Pontianak in West Kalimantan on 19 June and return on 22 June. On 14 August, Bonaparte and Utomo were declared suspects for allegedly accepting bribes.

Police said $20,000 had been confiscated as evidence. Police also named businessman Tommy Sumardi a suspect for allegedly paying the bribes. Testifying in November 2020 at Sumardi's trial, Bonaparte said that when Sumardi had asked him to remove the Interpol red notice on Tjandra, the businessman had mentioned the names of then-National Police Criminal Investigation Agency chief Listyo Sigit Prabowo, lawmaker Azis Syamsuddin and People's Consultative Assembly speaker Bambang Soesatyo. Sumardi denied having mentioned their names to Napoleon. On 29 December 2020, Jakarta Anti-Corruption Court convicted Sumardi of corruption for his role in helping Tjandra to bribe the two senior police, sentencing him to two years in jail and fining him Rp100 million.

On 11 August 2020, the Attorney General’s Office arrested prosecutor Pinangki Sirna Malasari for allegedly accepting bribes of $500,000 in connection with efforts to assist Tjandra. Pinangki had made nine unauthorized trips to Singapore and Malaysia in 2019 allegedly to meet with Tjandra. On 22 August 2020, Pinangki's office was destroyed by a fire at the main building of the Attorney General's Office.

The Attorney General's Office on 8 September 2020 said Pinangki had used part of the $500,000 (Rp 7.5 billion) to fund a luxury lifestyle, such as purchasing a BMW X series car, paying for body and facial care, and renting an apartment for Rp75 million a month. Director of Investigations, Febrie Adriansyah, said Pinangki had transferred the money to a bank account of her younger sibling, Pungki Primarini, in an effort to avoid detection. The money from Djoko Tjandra was described as a down-payment for arranging an acquittal from the Supreme Court, with the assistance of NasDem Party politician Andi Irfan Jaya. Andi allegedly acted as a go-between, "selling" the names of Supreme Court judges to Djoko Tjandra to approach for an acquittal.

On 18 January 2021, Jakarta Anti-Corruption Court sentenced Andi to six years in jail for his role in the conspiracy to help Tjandra avoid jail time. The court heard that Andi had met with Tjandra, Pinangki and lawyer Anita Kolopaking in Kuala Lumpur on 25 November 2019. During the meeting, Andi proposed that Tjandra pay $100 million in order for the Supreme Court and the Attorney General's Office to arrange for Tjandra to be able to return to Indonesia without serving jail time; however, Tjandra only agreed to pay $10 million. The following day, Tjandra's brother-in-law Herriyadi Angga Kusuma gave $500,000 to Andi near Senayan City Mall as a down-payment for the bribe. Andi then gave the money to Pinangki, who gave $50,000 to Anita Kolopaking.

In February 2021, Pinangki was sentenced to 10 years in jail by Jakarta Anti-Corruption Court for her role in channeling the bribe money. On 10 March 2021, Napoleon Bonaparte was sentenced to four and a half years in jail for accepting US$370,000 and SGD$200,000 from Tjandra, and Prasetyo Utomo was sentenced to three and a half years for receiving US$100,000.

=== Lawsuit by fired lawyer ===
After his arrest, Djoko Tjandra appointed lawyer Otto Hasibuan to represent him for a fee of $2.5 million; however, Tjandra soon fired Otto on 15 August 2020. Otto on 25 September filed a lawsuit against Tjandra at the Commercial Court of Central Jakarta District Court, demanding full payment. The court on 27 October 2020 ruled the fee agreement was still valid and therefore Tjandra was obliged to pay the full amount.

== 2020 document forgery conviction ==
On 22 December 2020, East Jakarta District Court sentenced Djoko Tjandra to two years and six months in jail for falsification of travel documents, COVID-19 test certificates and health recommendation letters. Presiding judge M. Sirad said that although Tjandra had committed the crimes while a fugitive and endangered public health by traveling without a COVID-19 test, he was spared a heavier sentence because he is elderly and had been polite during his trial. Tjandra's lawyer, Soesilo Aribowo, complained the verdict was too heavy and claimed Tjandra had never requested a travel permit.

== 2021 bribery conviction ==
On 5 April 2021, Jakarta Anti-Corruption Court convicted Djoko Tjandra of corruption for giving bribes that went to two police officers and a state prosecutor. He was sentenced to four years and six months in jail and fined Rp100 million. Judges said mitigating considerations in his favor were his politeness during the trial and his advanced age. State prosecutor Junaedi had earlier recommended Tjandra be jailed for four years and fined Rp100 million for giving bribes to civil servants or state officials in a criminal conspiracy involving corruption.

Tjandra on 15 March 2021 told the court he had paid fees to facilitate his return to Indonesia but claimed he did not know the money would be used as bribes. He earlier said his actions were not a big problem because the payments had caused no state losses and were made in Malaysia, so there should be no domestic relationship to Indonesia.

Tjandra claimed he was a victim of fraud perpetrated by Pinangki and another state prosecutor, Rahmat, who had convinced him to pay fees. Tjandra said he gave Andi Irfan Jaya $500,000 as a down-payment for a requested $1 million fee for Pinangki to secure a Supreme Court fatwa that would enable him to return to Indonesia without serving his 2 year jail sentence from 2009. He said the 2009 sentence was a violation of the Criminal Procedure Code and a miscarriage of justice, making him a victim of injustice and human rights violations. The court heard that Pinangki and Andi Irfan formulated a 10-point "action plan" that involved a proposal to spend $10 million on bribing officials at the Attorney General's Office and the Supreme Court.

Tjandra claimed he canceled the action plan because he deemed it fraudulent. Of the money given to Pinangki, Tjandra said $200,000 was a legal fee for his lawyer, Anita Kolopaking, while the rest was a "consultant fee" for Andi Irfan. He therefore argued the "fees" did not constitute "bribes" or "gifts". "I appeal to Your Excellencies, the panel of judges who are trying this case, to be willing to release me, the defendant Djoko Soegiarto Tjandra, from all of the indictments and demands of the public prosecutor. However, if the honorable panel of judges has a different opinion, please give a verdict as light as possible," he said.

Tjandra told the court that former Malaysian prime minister Najib Razak had advised him to contact Tommy Sumardi in order to help him to enter Indonesia to register his request for a review of his 2009 corruption conviction and jail sentence. He said Sumardi asked for a fee of Rp15 billion and they settled on a fee of Rp10 billion. "To be able to enter Indonesia for the purposes of registering the review application, I asked for help from brother Tommy Sumardi, whom I know and based on a recommendation from Tommy Sumardi's in-law, my friend, former Malaysian Prime Minister Najib Razak, to check my status on the wanted list," he said. Tjandra claimed he did not know that Tommy Sumardi would use the money to bribe police.

Defense lawyer Susilo Ariwibowo on 12 April 2021 said Tjandra had filed an appeal against his conviction because the court had disregarded the defense's claim that the crime took place outside Indonesia, and that Djoko had canceled the plan to pay the Supreme Court after making a down-payment, and that he did not know Inspector General Napoleon Bonaparte and Brigadier General Prasetijo Utomo because Tommy Sumadi never told him about them.
