= Rozik Boedioro Soetjipto =

Indonesian politician (1943–2025)

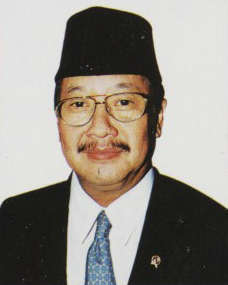
- Soetjipto in 1999

Minister of Public Works
- In office 23 October 1999 – 23 August 2000
- Preceded by: Rachmadi Bambang Sumadhijo
- Succeeded by: Erna Witoelar

Personal details
- Born: 20 August 1943 Karanganyar Regency, Japanese-occupied Dutch East Indies
- Died: 24 March 2025 (aged 81) Jakarta, Indonesia
- Education: Bandung Institute of Technology; KU Leuven

Rozik Boedioro Soetjipto (20 August 1943 – 24 March 2025) was an Indonesian politician. He served as minister of public works from 1999 to 2000.

Rozik died in Jakarta on 24 March 2025, at the age of 81.
