= Andi Muhammad Ghalib =

Indonesian politician (1946–2016)

Andi M. Ghalib
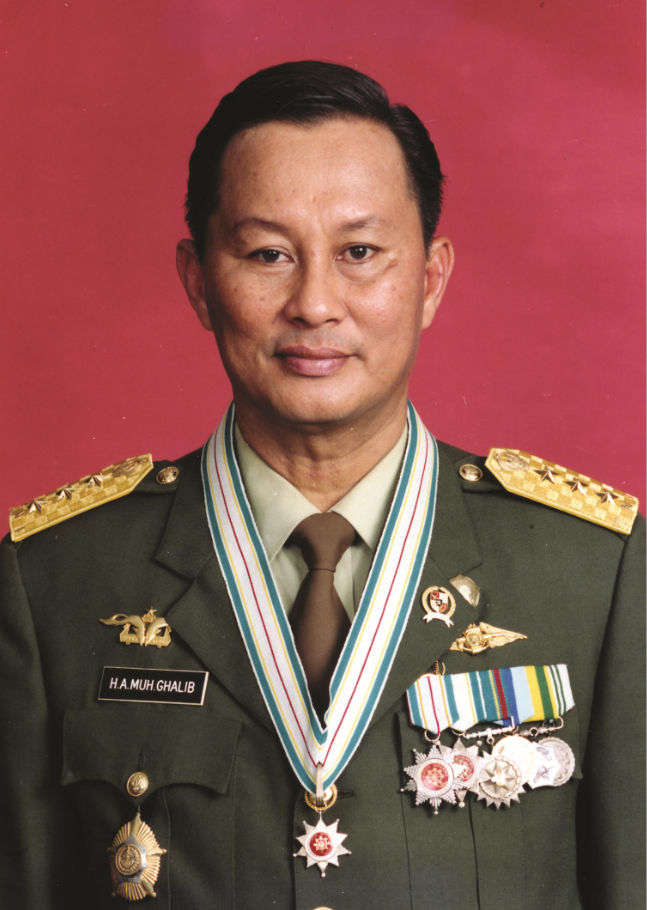

Attorney General of Indonesia
- In office 15 June 1998 – June 1999
- President: B. J. Habibie
- Preceded by: Sujono Atmonegoro
- Succeeded by: Marzuki Darusman

Personal details
- Born: 3 June 1946 Bone, South Sulawesi, Indonesia
- Died: 9 May 2016 (aged 69) Pancoran, South Jakarta, Indonesia
- Party: United Development Party
- Relations: Andi Muhammad Sulthan Yusuf (grandchild-in-law)

Military service
- Allegiance: Indonesia
- Branch/service: Indonesian Army
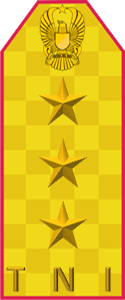
- Rank: Lieutenant General
- Unit: Army Law Corps

Andi Muhammad Ghalib (3 June 1946 – 9 May 2016) was an Indonesian military officer, politician, and diplomat. He served as the Attorney General of Indonesia from 1998 to 1999 within the Development Reform Cabinet of President B. J. Habibie. Ghalib resigned as Attorney General in June 1999 amid a corruption scandal.

Ghalib, an ethnic Bugis, was born in Bone in the present-day province of South Sulawesi on 3 June 1946. He was a native of Ujung Pandang, South Sulawesi.

On 15 June 1998, Indonesia's new President B. J. Habibie fired Indonesia's Suharto-era Attorney General, Sujono Atmonegoro, and appointed Maj. Gen. Andi Muhammad Ghalib as the country's new Attorney General. Ghalib has been serving as the director of the Indonesian National Armed Forces' law office at the time of his appointment. Ghalib was Attorney General of Indonesia within President Habibie's Development Reform Cabinet from June 1998 until June 1999.

However, on 3 June 1999, which coincided with Ghalib's 53rd birthday, Teten Masduki, the then-head of Indonesia Corruption Watch (ICW), released an investigation which alleged that Ghalib and his wife had deposited an estimated 9 billion rupiah ($1.2 million), which was given by Indonesian tycoons and businessmen, in nine different bank accounts between September 1998 and May 1999. Ghalib announced that he would temporarily step down as Attorney General on 14 June 1999, with a letter of resignation dating from 9 June.

From 2008 until 2013, Ghalib served as the Ambassador of Indonesia to India.

Ghalib, a member of the United Development Party (PPP), was a member of the People's Representative Council, also known as the House of Representatives, representing the South Sulawesi II electoral district, at the time of his death in 2016. He died on 9 May 2016 at Medistra Hospital in Pancoran, South Jakarta, at the age of 69.
