= Permata Bank =

Indonesian company

PT Bank Permata Tbk
- Permata Bank's new logo, which adopted Bangkok Bank's logogram, used since 27 September 2024

- Permata Bank headquarter in Jakarta
- Formerly: Bank Persatuan Dagang Indonesia (1954–1971); Bank Bali (1971–2002)
- Type: Public
- Traded as: IDX: BNLI
- Industry: Banking; Financial services
- Founded: 17 December 1954; 71 years ago
- Headquarters: Jakarta, Indonesia
- Key people: Meliza Musa Rusli (CEO)
- Number of employees: 7,248
- Parent: Bangkok Bank
- Website: www.permatabank.com

Permata Bank (or Bank Permata) is a bank in Indonesia, headquartered in the capital city Jakarta. It has officially become a BUKU IV bank after receiving confirmation from the Financial Services Authority (OJK) on 20 January 2021. Serving nearly four million customers in 62 cities of Indonesia, it has 304 branch offices and two mobile branches. Currently, the bank is led by Meliza Musa Rusli as the CEO.

== History ==
Former Permata Bank logo, used from 18 February 2003 until 27 September 2024

Permata Bank was formed with merger of five banks under the management of the Indonesian Bank Restructuring Agency (IBRA), namely:

- PT Bank Bali Tbk - established in 1954, then center of a corruption scandal;
- PT Bank Universal Tbk;
- PT Bank Prima Express;
- PT Bank Artamedia; and
- PT Bank Patriot.

Based on the Decree of the Deputy Governor of Bank Indonesia No. 4/159/KEP.DpG/2002 dated 30 September 2002, Bank Indonesia approved the merger of the four banks under the management of IBRA into Bank Bali. Furthermore, based on the Letter of the Deputy Governor of Bank Indonesia No. 4/162/KEP.DpG/2002 dated 18 October 2002, Bank Indonesia agreed to change the name of PT Bank Bali Tbk to PT Bank Permata Tbk. Bank Artamedia's operational merger was completed on October 21, 2002, while those of Bank Prima Express, Bank Universal, Bank Patriot, and Bank Universal were completed on 4 November 2002, 18 November 2002, and 16 December 2002, respectively. The Permata Bank logo was unveiled on 18 February 2003, once the merger procedure was complete. The Permata Bank logo consists of three colors, namely blue, red and green. Blue represents eternity, red represents passion, and green represents prosperity.

The merger of the five banks is an implementation of the Government's decision regarding the Advanced Restructuring Program issued on 22 November 2001, which aims to form a bank with a strong capital structure, sound financial condition and high competitiveness in carrying out an intermediation function, with a service network. a wider range and a wider range of products.

In 2004, Standard Chartered Bank and PT Astra International Tbk took over Permata Bank and started a massive transformation process within the organization. Furthermore, as a manifestation of its commitment to PermataBank, the joint ownership of the major shareholders increased to 89.01% in 2006.

Permata Bank obtained a license as a commercial bank based on the Decree of the Minister of Finance No.19371 / U.M.II dated 19 February 1957.

=== Bangkok Bank Strategic Investment ===
On 13 December 2019, one of Thailand's largest financial groups, Bangkok Bank announced plans to acquire majority ownership of Permata Bank through conditional sale and purchase agreements with Astra International and Standard Chartered Bank. After going through a long process, PermataBank made history in May 2020 through an acquisition transaction conducted by Bangkok Bank Public Company Limited ("Bangkok Bank"). Bangkok Bank officially became the controlling shareholder of PermataBank after taking over 89.12% of Permata Bank's shares from the total number of shares that had been issued and paid up by Standard Chartered Bank and Astra International for Rp33.66 trillion (US$2.3 billion). On 27 September 2024, Permata Bank officially adopted Bangkok Bank's logo symbol as a new logo.

=== Shareholders ===
| Shareholder | 2002 | 2003 | 2004 | 2005 | 2006 | 2007 | 2008 | 2009 | 2020 |
|---|---|---|---|---|---|---|---|---|---|
| BPPN | 91,33% | 91,33% | - | - | - | - | - | - | - |
| Government | 6,34% | 5,84% | 26,17% ^{1} | 26,16% ^{1} | - | - | - | - | - |
| Public | 2,33% | 2,83% | 10,73% | 10,74% | 10,990% | 10,990% | 10,990% | 10,990% | 1,29% |
| Astra International | - | - | 31,55% | 31,55% | 44,505% | 44,505% | 44,505% | 44,505% | - |
| Standard Chartered Bank | - | - | 31,55% | 31,55% | 44,505% | 44,505% | 44,505% | 44,505% | - |
| Bangkok Bank | - | - | - | - | - | - | - | - | 98,71% |

== Subsidiaries ==
=== Current ===
- PT Sahabat Finansial Keluarga - Consumer Finance

=== Former ===
- PT Sarana Bali Ventura - Venture Capital
- PT Sarana Bersama Pengembangan Indonesia - Investment (in liquidation)
- PT Aplikanusa Lintasarta - Communication
- PT Kustodian Sentral Efek Indonesia - Capital Market

== Board of Commissioner and Board of Directors ==
=== Board of Commissioner ===
- President Commissioner: Chatsiri Sophonpanich
- Commissioner: Chong Toh
- Commissioner: Niramarn Laisathit
- Commissioner: Chalit Tayjasanant
- Independent Commissioner: Haryanto Sahari
- Independent Commissioner: Rahmat Waluyanto
- Independent Commissioner: Goei Siauw Hong
- Independent Commissioner: Yap Tjay Soen

=== Board of directors ===
- President Director: Meliza Musa Rusli
- Compliance Director: Dhien Tjahajani
- Finance Director: Lea Setianti Kusumawijaya
- HR Director: Dayan Sadikin
- Tech & Ops Director: Abdy Dharma Salimin
- Wholesale Banking: Darwin Wibowo
- Retail Banking: Djumariah Tenteram
- Sharia Banking Director: Herwin Bustaman
- Risk Director: Setiatno Budiman

== See also ==
- Bank Indonesia
- List of banks in Indonesia
