= Napoleon Bonaparte (police officer) =

Indonesian police general (1965–2026)

Police Inspector General Napoleon Bonaparte
- Bonaparte in 2000

Head of the International Division of the Indonesian National Police
- In office 11 February 2020 – 28 July 2020
- Preceded by: Saiful Maltha
- Succeeded by: Johny Asadoma

Personal details
- Born: 26 October 1965 Baturaja, South Sumatra, Indonesia
- Died: 18 October 2026 (aged 60) Depok, West Java, Indonesia
- Resting place: Cikeas Heroes' Cemetery, Bogor, West Java
- Police career
- Department: Investigation (Reserse)
- Branch: Indonesian National Police
- Service years: 1988–2023
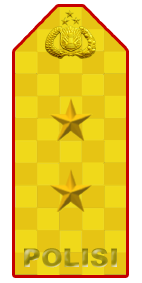
- Rank: Inspector General

Napoleon Bonaparte (26 October 1965 – 18 October 2026) was an Indonesian police officer who last served as the Head of the International Division of the Indonesian National Police. He served in the police force since 1988, reaching the rank of Inspector General after postings in South Sumatra, Yogyakarta, the Criminal Investigation Agency, and Indonesia's Interpol bureau.

Following his involvement in the Djoko Tjandra scandal, he was removed from office in July 2020. He was sentenced by trial to four years in prison, and rejoined the police force following his release in 2023.

== Early life and education ==
Napoleon Bonaparte was born on 26 October 1965 in the town of Baturaja, in Ogan Komering Ulu Regency of South Sumatra, Indonesia. He was the son of Mohamad Sari, a native of Empat Lawang in South Sumatra. His mother was of mixed Indo-Manado descent. His father was an admirer of the French emperor Napoleon Bonaparte and thus his son became a namesake. Bonaparte was the eldest of four siblings. Bonaparte graduated from the Indonesian Police Academy in 1988.

== Career ==
Bonaparte began police service after graduating from the Indonesian Police Academy. While serving as Deputy Chief of Cengkareng Police in West Jakarta, Bonaparte was cast as Lieutenant Gusman, the main character of the soap opera Pedang Keadilan (The Sword of Truth), about the life of police officers, produced with the cooperation between the Indonesian National Police and Maheran Mukti Wiguna.

He received his first appointment as the head of the police resort of Ogan Komering Ulu Regency. Two years into his office, he was transferred to the South Sumatra Provincial Police as the deputy director of the investigation and criminal department. In 2009, Bonaparte received a promotion from the rank of Police Grand Commissioner Attendant to Police Grand Commissioner, and served as the director of the investigation and criminal department in the Yogyakarta Provincial Police. The directorate handled 97 cases in his first three months as director, including the discovery of 4,200 counterfeit gas stoves and 768 counterfeit gas cans in Sleman. At the end of his tenure in Yogyakarta, he initiated an operation aimed at countering the distribution of pirated and unlicensed software.

After three years in Yogyakarta, Bonaparte was transferred to the Criminal Investigation Agency, where he became the head of the III Subdirectorate in the Directorate of General Crime (2011–2012) and the head of the Assistance and Training Section in the Supervising Coordinator of the Civil State Officer Investigator (2012–2015). As head of the subdirectorate, he led a team to arrest the owner of an illegal arcade in Batam, Riau Islands. In 2015, he was moved from the Criminal Investigation Agency to the Indonesian Police Academy as the head of the Education Administration. A year later, he was moved to the International Relations Division of the Indonesian National Police as the Head of the International Convention Section.

Napoleon Bonaparte delivering a speech at the EU-ASEAN Migration and Border Management Programme, 2017

On 20 July 2017, Bonaparte was appointed Secretary of the National Central Bureau, the Interpol of Indonesia. He was promoted from the rank of Police Grand Commissioner to Police Brigadier General on 5 September 2017, to the office of the International Division of the Indonesian National Police on 11 February 2020, and from Police Brigadier General to Police Inspector General two days later.

== Criminal cases ==
=== Djoko Tjandra scandal ===
==== Chronology ====
Bonaparte was deemed guilty for removing the red notice—a notice used by the Interpol to identify international fugitives—of Djoko Tjandra. According to the prosecutor in Bonaparte's trial, Tjandra became acquainted with him through his friends, Tommy Sumardi and Prasetijo Utomo, who at that time held office as the Head of Coordination and Supervision of Civil Servant Investigators. Sumardi met Bonaparte on 16 April 2020 at the Trans-National Crime Center while carrying a maroon paper bag. The next day, Sumardi went again to the same place, this time accompanied by Utomo. Bonaparte supposedly said that the removal of Tjandra's red notice required a payback. He later received S$200,000 on 28 April, $100,000 on 29 April, and $150,000 on 4 May. On 4 May, he instructed one of his subordinates, Tommy Aria Dwianto, to create a letter on behalf of the International Relations Division with the title of "Renewal of Interpol Notices Data" to the Ministry of Law and Human Rights. The next day, he created a similar letter to the Ministry of Law and Human Rights, this time informing the ministry that the data had been deleted. Bonaparte received another $150,000 after sending the second letter.

==== Trial ====
Bonaparte was removed from office on 17 July 2020 because "ethical and disciplinary misconducts carry sanctions" following the revelation of his involvement in the Tjandra case. He was named as the suspect on 14 August, following Tjandra's return to Indonesia. He was arrested on 14 October and brought to trial on 15 February 2021. The prosecutor demanded his imprisonment for three years. However, the judge increased his sentence. On 10 March 2021, Bonaparte was found guilty of corruption and was sentenced to four years in prison and a fine of 100 million Indonesian rupiahs. He announced his plans to appeal the sentence and deemed the verdict as a "personal harassment". He was on parole from April 2023 on. The police ethics court sentenced him to a demotion for three years and four months, although by the time he was released he was already in the retirement preparation period. He retired in November of the same year.

=== Muhammad Kace case ===
On 18 September 2021, Bonaparte was reported to have been involved in and persecuted Muhammad Kace, a Christian preacher suspect in a religious blasphemy case who was held at the National Police Criminal Investigation Detention Center. At the time, he was also being imprisoned in the same location for the Djoko Tjandra case. Bonaparte admitted on trial that he smeared his own feces onto Kace's face in order to punish him for "insulting the Prophet Muhammad" while in detention. He was sentenced to 5.5 months of prison over the incident in September 2022, and the verdict was upheld on appeal to the Supreme Court of Indonesia.

== Personal life and death ==
Bonaparte was married to Erlin Napoleon, and the couple had four children. Bonaparte's son, Jevo Batara, joined the police force as well.

He died at the University of Indonesia Hospital in Depok, West Java, on 18 October 2026, at the age of 60. He was buried on 19 October at Cikeas Heroes' Cemetery in Bogor, West Java.

== Filmography ==
=== Television ===
Year	Title	Role	R
1994	Pedang Keadilan (Sword of Truth)	Lieutenant Gusman	
