= Certificate of Citizenship (Indonesia) =

Identity document of Indonesia

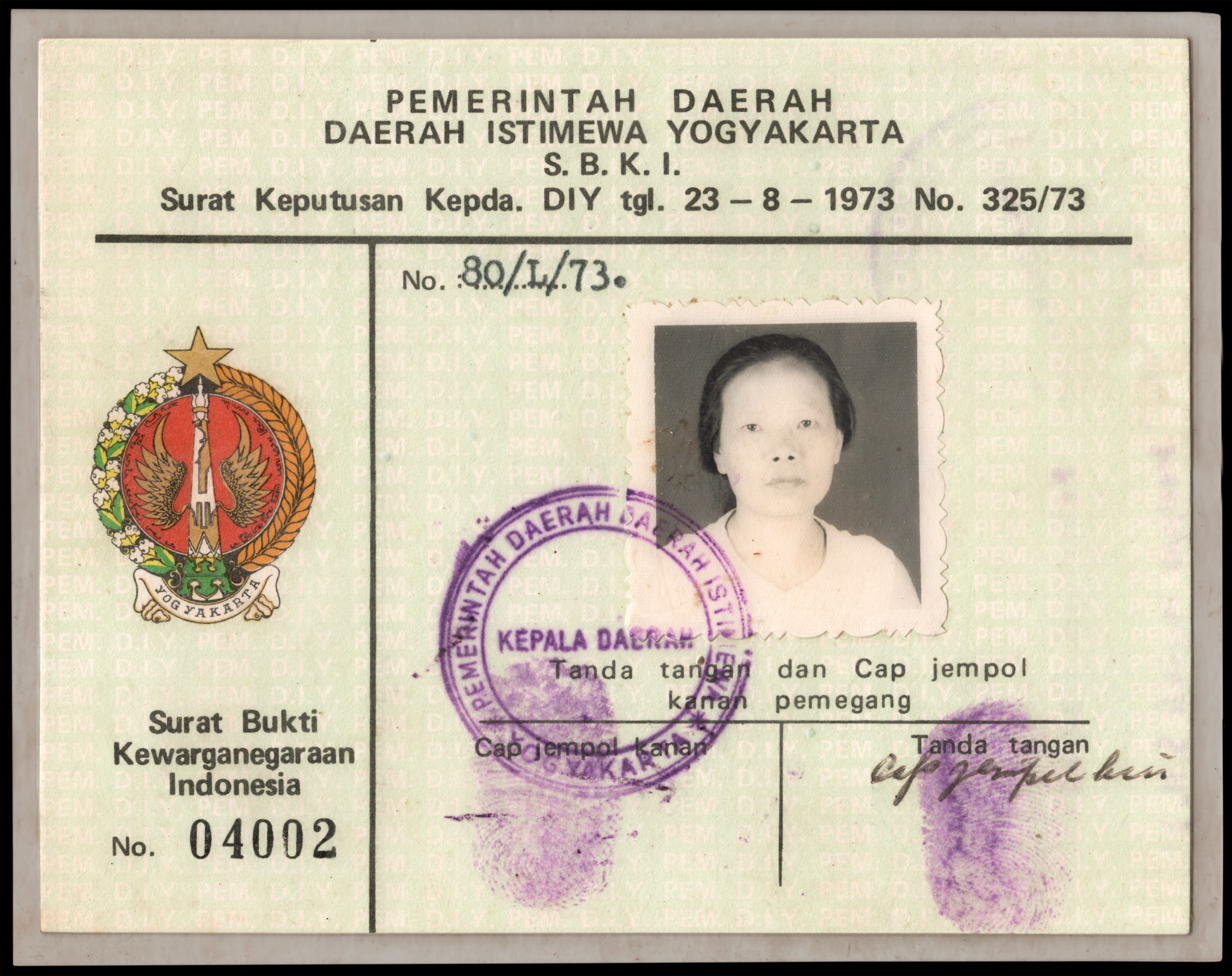
SBKRI from 1973; obverse showed the card-holder's portrait, fingerprints, and signature

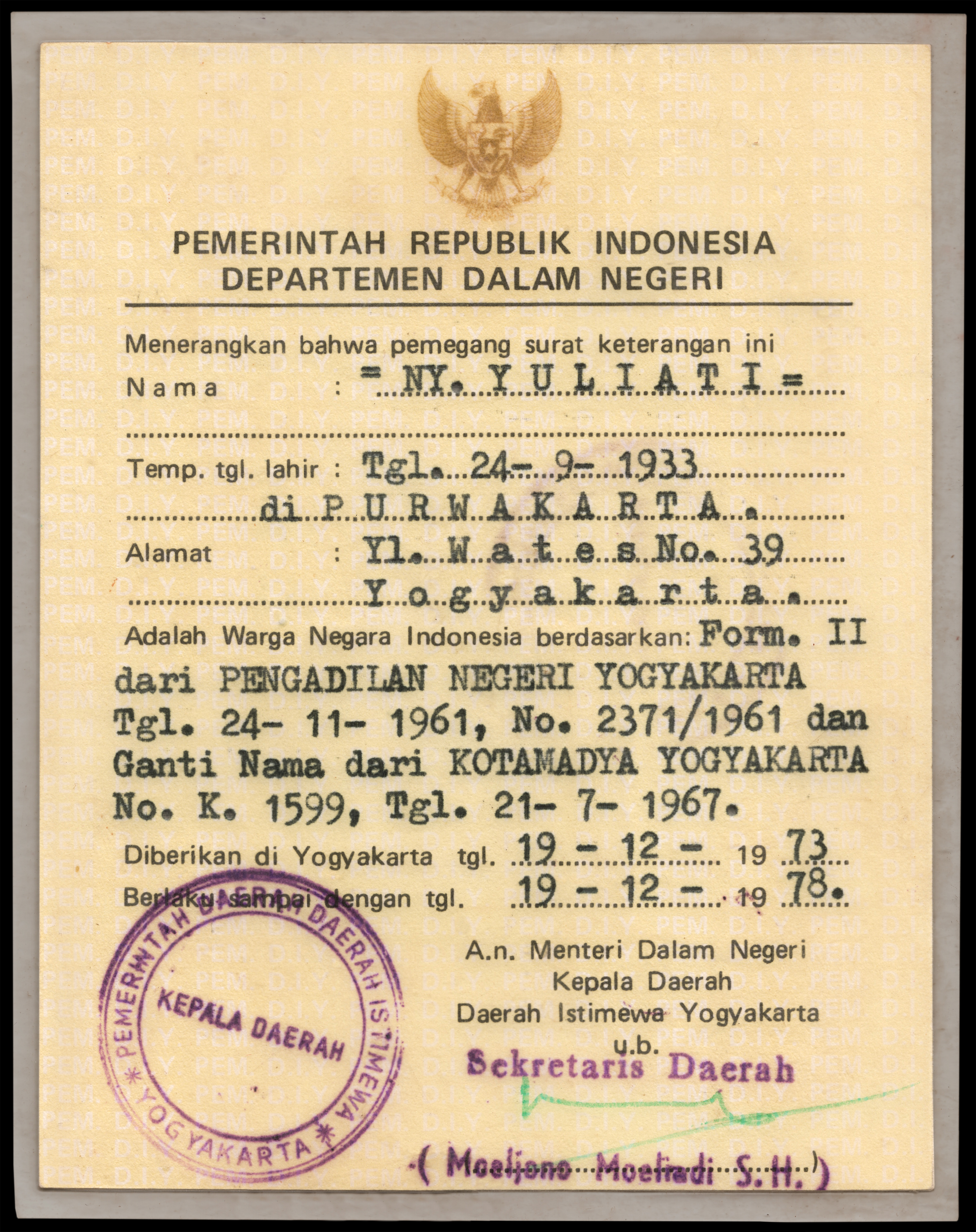
SBKRI from 1973; reverse showed the card-holder's biodata as well as the card's legal basis and validity period

The Certificate of Citizenship of the Republic of Indonesia (Indonesian: Surat Bukti Kewarganegaraan Republik Indonesia; abbreviated SBKRI) was an identity card establishing citizenship in the Republic of Indonesia.

The SBKRI was used to discriminate against Indonesians of Chinese descent. It was required to enter academia, obtain a passport, to register for an election, and to get married. The requirement was eventually abolished although local bureaucracies have continued to engage in abuses.

The legal bases for SBKRI was established with the Act No. 62 of 1958 issued by the Minister of Justice G. A. Maengkom and approved by President Sukarno. It came in the wake of Mao Zedong's decree that all Chinese people everywhere are citizens of the People's Republic of China based on the principle of jus sanguinis (blood descendants). This was followed with the Dual Nationality Agreement between Indonesia and China between Zhou Enlai and Soenario in 1955.

== Reform ==
On July 8, 1996, President Suharto issued Presidential Decree (Decree) No. 56 of 1996 on Proof of Indonesian Citizenship.

Chapter 4, point 2, reads, "For the citizens of the Republic of Indonesia, which has had a national identity card (KTP), or Family Card (KK), or a birth certificate, the fulfillment of the requirements for the particular interests simply use the Identity Card, or Card Family (KK), or the Birth Certificate. "

While Article 5 reads, "With the enactment of this Presidential Decree, all legislation that for certain interests require SBKRI, is no longer valid."

At 1999, Presidential Instruction No. 4/1999 on the Implementation of Presidential Decree No. 56/1996 was issued, which invalidates the SBKRI for ethnic Chinese who has become a citizen. However, practice of SBKRI requirements still exist in the government bureaucracy because of the lack of socialization of the implementation of this decree, and also because of the weakness of the Indonesian legal system that led to the legislation can not simply be ignored.

== Timeline ==
=== Sukarno era ===
- 1946 - Indonesian legislation establishes that Indonesia adheres to the principle of jus soli and anyone who was born in Indonesia is an Indonesian citizen. The Chinese people in Indonesia since the Proclamation of 1945 were considered ethnic Chinese Indonesians.
- 1949 - The Chinese in Indonesia were required to choose whether they want to be a citizen.
- 1955 - A Dual Nationality Treaty was signed between China and Indonesia. It is based on a claim of Mao Zedong that China adheres to the principle of jus sanguinis, which meant that anyone who was born into a Chinese family (offspring of male Chinese) automatically becomes a citizen of China. (This is a political reason for the support of overseas Chinese circles as done by Republic of China (Taiwan)). In the Asian-African Conference held in Bandung in 1955, Zhou Enlai stated that ethnic Chinese in Indonesia owes allegiance to their ancestral state.
- 1958 - An agreement set forth in the Act confirms that the Chinese in Indonesia will be allowed to choose their nationality of China or Indonesia once more, with the deadline being the 1962 elections. They must choose allegiance and maintain a single citizenship.

=== New Order ===
- 1969 - The Treaty of Dual Nationality gets canceled. Those with dual nationality become stateless.
- 1978 - SBKRI is required for Chinese citizens as per a regulation issued by the Minister of Justice.
- 1983 - A decree passed by the Minister of Justice confirmed that the SBKRI is only mandatory for those who took the declaration in having a Dual Nationality and expressed the desire to become a citizen. As such, a single citizen and its descendants (who has claimed to be a citizen before 1962 and their descendants, as well as all of those who were born after 1962) are not required to have SBKRI.
- 1992 - A decree issued by the Minister of Justice confirms that descendants of SBKRI holders are enough to prove their citizenship.
- 1996 - SBKRI is no longer required for Chinese citizens by a presidential decision; however, it is not publicly known due to the lack of socialization.

=== Reformasi ===
- 1999 - The Presidential Decree of 1996 was reinforced once again by the Presidential Decree of 1999, reconfirming that SBKRI is not in required anymore.
