= Indonesian Bank Restructuring Agency =

Indonesian financial regulatory authority

Logo of Indonesian Bank Restructuring Agency

The establishment of the Indonesian Bank Restructuring Agency (IBRA) (Indonesian: Badan Penyehatan Perbankan Nasional, BPPN), lit. "National Banking Revitalization Agency") in early 1998 was one of a series of steps taken by the Indonesian government, in agreement with the International Monetary Fund on 15 January 1998, in response to the banking and economic crisis which emerged following the onset of the Asian monetary crisis in mid-1997. Among other things, the drastic depreciation of the rupiah (Rp) reduced bank liquidity, and loss of public confidence in the rupiah and the banking system in general.

In establishing IBRA, the Indonesian authorities were effectively establishing a "bad bank" financial vehicle to allow the segregation of bad debts away from established banks with the aim of promoting the overall recovery of Indonesia's financial system.

As a measure to cope with the scarcity of liquidity in the nation's banking system, in late 1997 and early 1998 the central bank (Bank Indonesia), as a lender of the last resort, provided liquidity assistance loans to banks. In addition, the Government instituted a blanket guarantee program for all bank liabilities, to arrest further erosion of confidence towards the system. This process left the Indonesian banking system holding a large number of bad loans at the end of 1997.

== History ==
=== Establishment ===
IBRA was established on 26 January 1998 (based on the Presidential Decree No 27 year 1998) and was planned to have lifespan of five years in order to undertake its tasks. In the event, IBRA's liquidation took longer than planned and the Agency was finally terminated on 30 April 2004. According to the decree establishing IBRA (Presidential Decree No. 27 Year 1998), IBRA's objectives were to administer the government's blanket guarantee program, and to supervise, manage and restructure distress banks. These objectives were extended on 27 February 1999 to include managing the government's assets in performing banks under restructuring status and to optimize the recovery rate of asset disposals of distressed banks. IBRA undertook a comprehensive series of activities consisting of bank liability program, bank restructuring, bank loan restructuring, shareholders settlement, and the recovery of state funds. These were carried out by the major operating units within IBRA (Bank Restructuring, Asset Management Credit, Asset Management Investment, Risk Management, and Support and Administration).

IBRA was supervised by the Ministry of Finance, the Financial Sector Policy Committee (FSPC) and the Oversight Committee. A Financial Sector Policy Committee (FSPC/Komite Kebijakan Sektor Keuangan) was formed on 21 August 1998 whose members included the main economic ministers of Indonesia, and the Independent Review Committee (IRC), which includes representatives from International Monetary Funds (IMF), the World Bank and Asian Development Bank (ADB).

=== Controversy ===
During the period of the existence of the Agency, IBRA had a troubled record. The Agency was criticized for being slow in implementing its tasks of restructuring, for lack of transparency, and for alleged irregulatories. There was also considerable controversy surrounding its operations, including the salaries of senior staff which were said to be very high. One of the most known controversy of the IBRA is the Bank Bali Scandal where Golkar Party officials colluded with the IBRA and businessman Rudy Ramli to pay an illegal commission in which part of the fund is used for B.J Habibie re-election bid.

=== Leadership ===
One main problem for the Agency was that, partly because of period of political instability that Indonesia passed through after the fall of President Suharto in May 1998, there were numerous changes in leadership (of the Ketua or the chair) of IBRA. During the six years of IBRA's operations, there were a total of seven heads of the Agency.

Heads ("Ketua") of IBRA 1998-2004

No	Name	Start	Finish	Months
1	Bambang Subianto	Jan 1998	Mar 1998	2
2	Iwan Prawiranata	Mar 1998	22 Jun 1998	3
3	Glenn S. Yusuf	22 Jun 1998	12 Jan 2000	19
4	Cacuk Sudarijanto	12 Jan 2000	6 Nov 2000	10
5	Edwin Gerungan	6 Nov 2000	25 Jun 2001	7
6	I Putu Gede Ary Suta	25 Jun 2001	19 Apr 2002	10
7	Syafruddin Arsjad Temenggung	19 Apr 2002	27 Feb 2004	22

=== Closure ===
When the Agency was finally closed at the end of April 2004, the head of Indonesia's Supreme Audit Agency, Billy Joedono was cautious about reaching conclusions about the performance of IBRA. Before submitting a report to the Indonesian Parliament, Billy Joedono noted that IBRA appeared to have done its job in restructuring the majority of troubled banks but nevertheless left further conclusions about the performance of IBRA to the Parliament.'

== See also ==
- List of financial supervisory authorities by country
