= Bank Bali scandal =

1999 banking fraud in Indonesia, widely referred as "Baligate"

Bank Bali scandal Baligate
- Bank Bali Logo
- Type: white collar crime, banking fraud, political corruption
- Location: Jakarta, Indonesia
- Key people: Rudy Ramli, A. A. Baramuli, Setya Novanto, Djoko Tjandra, Pande Lubis, Syahril Sabirin, B.J. Habibie

The Bank Bali scandal occurred in Indonesia in 1999 when Golkar Party officials colluded with the Indonesian Bank Restructuring Agency (IBRA) to coerce Bank Bali chief Rudy Ramli to pay an illegal commission of Rp546 billion (then equivalent to about US$80 million) to private company Era Giat Prima in order to collect Rp904.6 billion owed by two banks taken over by IBRA.

Part of the funds were used to support then-president B.J. Habibie's re-election bid, but his accountability speech was rejected by the nation's top legislative body after the scandal broke. The scandal was widely referred to as Baligate (after Bank Bali and the Watergate scandal). Most of those involved, including Golkar officials and Habibie aides, were either acquitted or not even prosecuted.

== Background ==
The 1997-98 Asian financial crisis resulted in the collapse of 64 Indonesian banks. Numerous problematic banks were taken over by the government, which restructured and merged some of them. Prior to the crisis, Bank Bali was Indonesia's fourth-largest privately owned bank and was considered well managed.

Bank Bali had extended interbank loans to Bank Dagang Nasional Indonesia (BDNI), Bank Umum Nasional (BUN) and Bank Tiara Asia (Tiara) amounting to Rp1.477 trillion of principal and interest by 31 December 1998.

On 4 April 1998, BDNI, BUN and Tiara were among seven Indonesian banks placed under government supervision because of massive liquidity problems. Their obligations and assets were transferred to IBRA, which had been formed in January 1998, representing the Indonesian government.

A March 1998 joint decree of guidelines issued by IBRA and Bank Indonesia outlined the requirements for eligibility of claims for payment under the government's blanket guarantee for bank loans.

By 11 January 1999, the balance of Bank Bali's interbank loans, after being offset by its liabilities to BDNI and Tiara, and adjustment for foreign exchange losses, amounted to Rp1.235 trillion, comprising Rp869.8 billion for BDNI, Rp327.3 billion for BUN and Rp38 billion for Tiara.

Also in 1999, President B.J. Habibie was seeking re-election, which would require support from a majority of Golkar Party's 27 provincial chapter heads, and then support from members of the People's Consultative Assembly (DPR). In an effort to obtain this support, Habibie's top advisor, Achmad Arnold Baramuli, organized the raising and distribution of funds.

== Events ==
=== Meetings, memos and requests ===
Bank Bali president director Rudy Ramli, who had inherited the bank from his father in 1992, was unable to reclaim Bank Bali's interbank loans from IBRA by January 1999. He needed to collect the debts to meet capitalization requirements and prevent IBRA from taking over the bank. Under the government's bank guarantee scheme, the funds should have been automatically reimbursed to Bank Bali.

In October 1998, Rudy's wife informed him that property tycoon Djoko Tjandra wanted to meet him. Rudy was later pressured by Djoko Tjandra to use the services of his debt collection company, PT Era Giat Prima (EGP), which agreed to help Bank Bali recover its money from IBRA, in return for EGP receiving an enormous commission of 60% of all proceeds. EGP was owned by Djoko Tjandra and run by Setya Novanto, who was deputy treasurer of Golkar Party and part of Habibie's re-election team.

On 11 January 1999, Bank Bali and Setya Novanto signed a cessie agreement (a type of loan syndication) for recovery of its interbank loans, amounting to Rp598.1 billion owed by BDNI and Rp200 billion owed by BUN. The agreement was not recorded in Bank Bali's official report at the time, and was not registered with Bank Indonesia. Another Rp38 billion was to be recovered from Tiara via a cessie agreement with a company called PT Persada Harum Lestari (PHL).

On 11 February 1999, a meeting was held at EGP director Djoko Tjandra's Hotel Mulia in Jakarta to discuss the Bank Bali credit issue. Among those present were: Rudy Ramli, Djoko Tjandra, Bank Bali director Firman Soetjahja, Supreme Advisory Council (DPA) chairman Arnold Baramuli, State-Owned Enterprises minister Tanri Abeng, Bank Indonesia governor Syahril Sabirin, IBRA deputy chairman Pande Nasorahona Lubis, and EGP president director Setya Novanto. Most of them later denied attending the meeting.

On 18 February 1999, Pande Lubis instructed Erman Munzir, the director of banking development at Bank Indonesia, to re-examine Bank Bali's claims. Erman assigned the task to a team from Bank Indonesia's bank examination division. On 22 March 1999, the team concluded that Bank Bali's claims were eligible. Erman sent a letter to IBRA chairman Glenn Yusuf, informing him of the conclusion and mentioning the cessie agreement between Bank Bali and EGP.

On 29 March 1999, EGP issued two letters, authorizing Bank Bali to collect its loans and interest from BUN and BDNI on its behalf.

On 9 April 1999, IBRA again rejected Bank Bali's claims, saying there needed to be an agreement from the finance minister and Bank Indonesia. On 14 April 1999, Pande Lubis sent a memo to IBRA's Glenn Yusuf, recommending immediate payment of the Bank Bali claims.

Rudy was still desperate to inject funds into Bank Bali, so he appointed JP Morgan to raise investors. JP Morgan soon shortlisted three serious potential investors: Citibank, ABN Amro, and GE Capital. According to Rudy, Citibank offered to buy Bank Bali's credit card business - then the second-largest in Indonesia - for Rp1.5 trillion, which would cover the Rp1.4 trillion he needed to strengthen his bank's capital. But JP Morgan disagreed with the proposed sale, so Rudy accepted an offer from GE Capital, but the deal was rejected by Bank Indonesia and IBRA. Rudy said Bank Indonesia instead pushed him to have Standard Chartered invest in Bank Bali. On 22 April 1999, in front of reporters at Bank Indonesia, Rudy signed an agreement for Standard Chartered to buy a stake in Bank Bali, with negotiations to conclude within three months, by 22 July 1999.

On 12 May 1999, Rudy Ramli met with then-finance minister Bambang Subianto at the latter's house to ask for help to cancel the agreement with EGP. Bambang later admitted to holding at least three meetings that month with Rudy and other officials.

On 14 May 1999, the March 1998 joint decree on requirements for eligibility of claims for payment under the government's blanket guarantee was amended to make Bank Bali's claims eligible for payment.

On 26 May 1999, Rudy met with Golkar figure Marimutu Manimaren and Habibie's associate Hariman Siregar at Jakarta's Ascott Apartment to ask for their help to get the payment to EGP canceled. Manimaren reportedly said that RI-1 (a reference to President Habibie) needed "only Rp300 billion".

=== The transfer ===
Djoko Tjandra had repeatedly urged IBRA chief Glenn Yusuf to approve a Rp904 billion payment to Bank Bali, but Yusuf declined. When Yusuf was in New York on 1 June 1999, his two deputies, Pande Lubis and Farid Harijanto, authorized the payment in his absence, even though it was a Sunday night. That night, the transfer of Rp904.6 billion was approved by Bank Indonesia and made by IBRA to Bank Bali for its claim to BDNI. Manimaren and Hariman asked Rudy to immediately transfer the Rp546.4 billion fee to EGP. Firman Soetjahja then transferred the fee on 3 June 1999. On that day, the EGP account began transferring funds to companies and officials, including Golkar leaders.

According to Rudy Ramli's journal, he met on 29 June 1999 with tycoon Anthony Salim and Habibie's younger brother Timmy Habibie. Anthony warned Rudy that the deal with EGP would cause problems because Djoko Tjandra had been boasting that he had "bought off Patra Kuningan [President Habibie]" with Rp300 billion. However, Timmy Habibie said the money received was only Rp200 billion via Tanri Abeng.

=== The scandal breaks ===
In April 1999, Standard Chartered agreed to purchase 20% of Bank Bali, subject to an audit of the bank's accounts. During this due diligence examination, it discovered a shortage of Rp546 billion – the money paid to EGP. The loss was reported by Standard Chartered on 20 July 1999.

Despite the discovery of the loss, a party still went ahead on the night of 22 July 1999 to celebrate Standard Chartered's planned purchase of a stake in the bank. About 500 people attended the lavish event for executives and senior staff of Bank Bali and Standard Chartered at Jakarta's five-star Hotel Shangri-La. But the following day, Bank Indonesia announced Bank Bali had been taken over by the government because it failed to meet a capital adequacy ratio requirement; however, the sale to Standard Chartered would go ahead. On 26 July 1999, Standard Chartered announced it had taken managerial control of Bank Bali.

At a public seminar on banking in Jakarta on 30 July, a banking law analyst named Pradjoto was asked why Standard Chartered had not finalized its investment in Bank Bali, as a three-month deadline had passed in mid-July. Pradjoto replied that the deal had stalled because Bank Bali was "a victim of money politics". He explained that a hole had been found in Bank Bali's balance sheet. He said Rudy Ramli had been for more than a year trying to secure his claim from IBRA and Bank Indonesia without success until he was forced to pay a huge "commission" to use a "facilitation" service.

After news of Bank Bali's massive payment to EGP was reported by the media, Habibie's re-election team sought to contain the damage. Setya Novanto resigned as Golkar deputy treasurer. Then, on 14 August, Baramuli told the media that EGP would return its fee to Bank Bali, and the repayment was made a few days later.

== IMF reaction and PwC audit ==
Under pressure from the International Monetary Fund (IMF) to disclose the truth behind the scandal, Indonesia's parliament commissioned independent auditor PricewaterhouseCoopers to investigate the case. After a two-week inquiry involving 20 auditors, PricewaterhouseCoopers presented its 123-page report to the State Audit Agency (BPK) on 7 September 1999. The report found "numerous indicators of fraud, noncompliance, irregularity, misappropriation, undue preferential treatment, concealment, bribery and corruption" in connection with the transaction, and indications of the possible involvement of "ministers, senior officials and members of parliament".

The scandal led to the suspension, for several months, of almost US$1.4 billion in loans coordinated by the IMF, the World Bank and the Asian Development Bank to help Indonesia overcome its economic crisis. The IMF demanded the full release of the audit report, but BPK chief Billy Yudono cited banking secrecy laws as a reason for giving the report only to police. A 36-page summary, which does not mention names, was made public. The summary also omitted details of the fund flow, at the request of the BPK.

In October 1999, the Supreme Court ruled that a full copy of the report should be given to the national parliament. Parliament later complained that a page was missing from the report.

== Botched cover-up and parliamentary inquiry ==
Although Pradjoto, who broke the scandal on 30 July 1999, had not named Golkar as being involved, Baramuli responded by saying Pradjoto should be sued for slander against Golkar.

Gamma weekly news magazine on 15 August 1999 printed the transcript of a recorded conversation between Baramuli and Setya Novanto. The conversation, which had taken place on 7 August, featured Baramuli advising Setya on how to justify EGP's huge commission. In the recording, Baramuli told Setya the deal was like a normal distressed debt sale and to keep their names out of it and instead use Djoko Tjandra's name. Telecommunications expert Roy Suryo told parliament his analysis indicated the recording was genuine.

On 23 August 1999, Indonesia Corruption Watch published Rudy Ramli's journal of meetings surrounding the scandal.

On 25 August 1999, Rudy met with ethnic Chinese businessman Kim Yohannes, a former business partner of Baramuli. Rudy later said Kim warned him the attorney general would prosecute him for corruption unless he retracted his journal. Rudy said Kim was talking on his phone to Baramuli at the time. Feeling the threat came directly from Baramuli, Rudy had his lawyer draft a series of retractions, one of which Kim sent to Baramuli on that day.

On 26 August 1999, following a cabinet meeting, Justice Minister/State Secretary Muladi read out a letter of retraction attributed to Rudy. The letter denied that Rudy's journal of the Bank Bali scandal was genuine. "I have never produced a chronology of the Bank Bali case, either in typeset or oral form. The chronology did not come from me and I therefore bear no responsibility for its contents," said the letter. The letter was supposed to show that Habibie's re-election team was not involved in the scandal. But reporters noticed the letter was signed by "Rudi Ramli" whereas the banker always spelled his first name as "Rudy".

When Rudy was questioned before a parliamentary commission of inquiry on 9 September 1999, he said he had been coerced to sign the retraction, and had signaled his reluctance by deliberately spelling his signature incorrectly.

Muladi was furious and demanded Rudy Ramli take a lie detector test. Baramuli responded by telling reporters that Rudy was a liar and a "heavy user of narcotics".

On 10 September, human rights lawyer Adnan Buyung Nasution, who had served as Rudy's lawyer in late August, revealed that his office had helped Rudy draft four versions of the retraction, but Rudy had been unable to choose what information to retract. Buyung said the letter read out by Muladi was a draft that never should have left his office. Buyung then resigned as Rudy's lawyer and met with Habibie. After the meeting, he said Habibie told him that Baramuli had supplied the letter containing Rudy's retraction. Muladi later confirmed Baramuli had secured the retraction.

Rudy was reluctant to discuss details of his journal with parliament, saying he and his family had received death threats. But he admitted to sending the journal on 13 August 1999 to a lawyer in the Indonesian Democratic Party of Struggle (PDIP), who later forwarded it to Indonesia Corruption Watch.

On 13 September 1999, Glenn Yusuf was questioned by parliament and stated Baramuli had masterminded the scandal, repeatedly asking him to disburse the claims of Bank Bali and two other banks. He said Baramuli had tried to have him dismissed as IBRA chairman and replaced by Pande Lubis.

Glenn confirmed Baramuli's accomplices included Tanri Abeng and Syahril Sabirin. He said Baramuli wanted to raise funds to buy votes in the MPR and had even discussed his calculations over how many seats a victory would cost.

On 14 September 1999, Finance Minister Bambang Subianto also blamed Baramuli and Tanri Abeng for the scandal. However, local media noted that Bambang had been associated with Pande Lubis for 36 years and the pair had worked at state-owned Bank Bapindo, which collapsed in 1994 due to mismanagement. When made finance minister, it was Bambang who had brought Pande Lubis to work in IBRA under Glenn Yusuf.

When questioned by parliament, Baramuli said "This is a conspiracy! These people are amoral – they only want to topple me, because it was I who made Golkar win (the 7 June 1999 general election). I always adhere to the teachings of the Prophet Muhammad, and I beseech Allah to forgive them for what they do."

Next to testify was Tanri Abeng, who refused to answer questions. He was followed by Setya Novanto, who said he had close ties to Baramuli and Tanri, but he insisted most of the funds that EGP received from Bank Bali, Rp426 billion, went to an account held by Djoko Tjandra, while Rp112 billion went to Manimaren's textile company Ungaran Sari Garment. Setya claimed he had initiated the repayment of the Rp546 billion to Bank Bali.

On 24 September 1999, the parliamentary commission of inquiry issued a statement naming 13 people involved in the scandal. There were seven government officials: Baramuli, Bambang Subianto, Tanri Abeng, Syahril Sabirin, Glenn Yusuf, Pande Lubis and IBRA deputy director Farid Harijanto; and six non-government officials: Djoko Tjandra, Setya Novanto, Kim Yohannes, Rudy Ramli and two other Bank Bali officials. The commission had wanted to name 16 people involved, but House speaker Harmoko and House Deputy Speaker Abdul Gafur – both members of Golkar – convinced it to drop three names: Marimutu Manimaren, Timmy Habibie and Hariman Siregar. They also wanted Baramuli's name omitted from the list, but failed.

== Civil case ==
After the scandal broke, IBRA canceled the cessie agreement and canceled EGP's right to the fee. Setya Novanto filed a civil lawsuit against the cancellation of EGP's fee. South Jakarta District Court in April 2000 ruled in EGP's favor. Jakarta High Court upheld the decision and granted the Attorney General's Office the authority to return the funds to EGP.

Bank Bali appealed the decision. On 8 April 2004, the Supreme Court granted the appeal. EGP filed a judicial review, which the Supreme Court rejected on 29 May 2007, so the money legally belonged to Bank Bali (which by then had been renamed Bank Permata). In a separate decision, the Supreme Court in June 2009 ruled the funds must be returned to the state treasury.

== Legal investigation and trials ==
=== Rudy Ramli ===
In August 1999, Indonesian police commenced an investigation into the scandal. Under the Habibie administration, police focused their investigation only on Rudy Ramli and three other directors of Bank Bali: Firman Soetjahja, Hendri Kurniawan and Rusli Suryadi. Rudy, who is ethnic Chinese and had suffered a stroke in March 1999, complained he was being made a scapegoat, as police did not target the Golkar politicians and government officials implicated in the scandal.

Police interrogated Rudy in September 1999 and incarcerated him for 38 days. On 11 November 1999, Rudy and the three Bank Bali directors went on trial at South Jakarta District Court. They were accused of violating the banking law for concealing payments from the central bank and faced up to 15 years in prison if convicted. All four were acquitted in December 1999, under the administration of Habibie's successor, Abdurrahman Wahid, when the court dismissed the charges against them.

=== Pande Lubis ===
Charged with corruption, Pande Lubis was acquitted by South Jakarta District Court on 23 November 2000. Presiding judicial panel chairman Putra Jadnya ruled that Lubis's decision to transfer IBRA funds to Bank Bali was made on behalf of IBRA, so Lubis was not responsible for the transaction as he had not made the decision in a personal capacity. State prosecutor Tarwo Hadi Sadjuri appealed the ruling, arguing Lubis abused his authority by illegally approving the Rp904.6 billion injection into Bank Bali. He said Bank Bali's claim against BDNI had already been processed through eight swap transactions and two other transactions, all of which were rejected by Bank Indonesia until Lubis intervened. Prosecutors also said Lubis applied additional interest to the loans and knew that at least 50% of the total funds would be transferred to EGP. The Supreme Court on 10 March 2004 sentenced Lubis to four years in jail. He was found guilty of defrauding the state and committing corruption. Lubis responded by complaining that he had only been following orders. He said the transaction had been approved by five IBRA officials and the then-finance minister. Lubis's attorney, Asfiduddin, argued the transaction was legal because it was based on a presidential decree and circular issued by the finance minister.

=== Syahril Sabirin ===
Syahril Sabirin threatened to sue PricewaterhouseCoopers over its audit report on the scandal, which he felt was unfair and speculative. On 13 March 2002, Central Jakarta District Court sentenced Sabirin to three years' imprisonment for violating the principles of prudent banking by his approval of the injection of funds into Bank Bali. He remained free and refused to resign from his position as Bank Indonesia head pending an appeal. Jakarta High Court on 29 August 2002, overturned the sentence. The Supreme Court in 2004 upheld his acquittal. On 11 June 2009, the Supreme Court re-examined the case and sentenced him to two years in jail.

=== Djoko Tjandra ===
On 27 September 1999, the Attorney General's Office began investigating Tjandra's role in the scandal. He was detained by the AGO from 29 September 1999 to 8 November 1999. He was then placed under city arrest from 9 November 1999 to 13 January 2000. He was then again detained by the office from 14 January 2000 to 10 February 2000. His case was submitted to South Jakarta District Court on 9 February 2000. The court decided he should be under city arrest. Tjandra was charged with corruption in "arranging and engaging in illegal transactions". On 6 March 2000, he was acquitted and released from city arrest, with deputy presiding judge R. Sunarto ruling the case should have been heard by a civil court, rather than a criminal court. Prosecutors had sought an 18-month sentence. The state prosecutor asked Jakarta High Court to review the ruling. On 31 March 2000, Jakarta High Court ordered South Jakarta District Court to examine and try Tjandra. He went back on trial in April 2000. Prosecutors again sought an 18-month sentence for corruption that caused state losses. On 28 August 2000, South Jakarta District Court declared Tjandra free from all charges. Judges said although the prosecutor's indictment of Tjandra's actions were proven legally, the action was not a criminal offense but a civil action. On 21 September 2000, state prosecutors filed an appeal. On 26 June 2001, the Supreme Court exonerated Tjandra of all charges. Judges Sunu Wahadi and M. Said Harahap found him not guilty, while judge Artidjo Alkotsar issued a dissenting opinion.

In October 2008, the Attorney General's Office filed for a Supreme Court judicial review of Tjandra's acquittal. On 10 June 2009, Tjandra flew on a chartered plane from Jakarta's Halim Perdanakusuma Airport to Port Moresby, Papua New Guinea. The next day, a Supreme Court review panel, chaired by Djoko Sarwoko, with members I Made Tara, Komariah E Sapardjaja, Mansyur Kertayasa and Artidjo Alkostar, accepted the judicial review. Tjandra was given a two-year prison sentence, fined Rp15 million and the disputed sum of Rp546,166,116,369 at Bank Permata was ordered confiscated for the state. Immigration belatedly placed a travel ban on Tjandra. On 16 June 2009, Tjandra failed to comply with a summons from the Attorney General's Office to begin serving his jail sentence. He ignored a second summons and was declared a fugitive. He was later granted citizenship by Papua New Guinea, which also gave him a passport in a new name and with a new birth date. In June 2020. Tjandra returned to Indonesia and filed a case review with South Jakarta District Court. He later flew to Malaysia, where he was arrested on 30 July 2020 and extradited to Indonesia to begin serving his sentence.

== Impact on Bank Bali ==
Under Rudy Ramli, Bank Bali had grown into Indonesia's fourth-largest private bank. It specialized in consumer banking and was respected by securities analysts for its relatively conservative loan portfolio.

After IBRA took over the management of Bank Bali in July 1999, Rudy was ousted as president director and management was then taken over by Standard Chartered PLC of London. More than 1,000 Bank Bali staff protested in Jakarta to show support for Rudy and to oppose expatriate managers appointed to the bank by Standard Chartered.

In February 2001, Bank Bali was merged with four other banks: Bank Artamedia, Bank Patriot, Bank Prima Express and Bank Universal. In October 2002, these merged banks were renamed Permata Bank. In September 2006, the Indonesian government sold its majority stake in Permata to Standard Chartered and Astra International for Rp5.6 trillion. According to the sale agreement, the disputed fund in the cessie account would remain with Bank Permata.

== Sociopolitical impact ==
Political corruption had flourished during former president Suharto's 32-year repressive reign but was rarely reported on by the Indonesian media. Baligate became one of the biggest post-Suharto corruption scandals and was widely reported on by the Indonesian media. Domestic coverage of the scandal often overshadowed news of East Timor's 1999 vote to secede from Indonesia.

Habibie refused to take action against the government officials accused of wrongdoing in the scandal. He rejected calls to suspend Barramuli from the DPA and instead on 14 August 1999 - when the scandal was unfolding - awarded him with the nation's highest honor, the Anugerah Bintang. Habibie's response to the scandal contributed to his failure to win re-election, when the People's Consultative Assembly on 19 October 1999 rejected his accountability speech by a vote of 355 to 322, despite strong lobbying for Habibie by Baramuli. The scandal is also credited with contributing to the end of Golkar Party's hold on power.

A report issued in March 2000 by the US State Department noted the Bank Bali scandal "entailed a large money laundering operation aimed at hiding numerous beneficiaries." The report urged Indonesia to implement anti-money laundering legislation and prudential bank supervisory practices to prevent Indonesian banks from being victimized in scandals. Indonesia in 2002 formed a Financial Transaction Reports and Analysis Center, then in 2010 enacted an anti-money laundering law and in 2011 established the Financial Services Authority.

== See also ==
- List of "-gate" scandals
