= Kuntoro Mangkusubroto =

Indonesian administrator and politician (1947–2023)

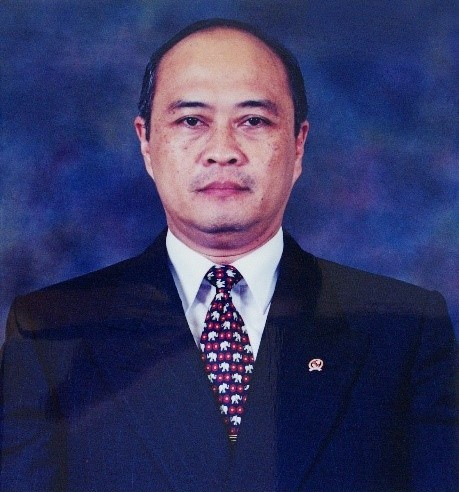

Head of the Presidential Unit of Development Supervision and Control
- In office 8 December 2009 – 31 December 2014
- President: Susilo Bambang Yudhoyono
- Preceded by: Marsillam Simanjuntak
- Succeeded by: Luhut Binsar Panjaitan (Presidential Chief of Staff)

10th Minister of Energy and Mineral Resources
- In office 14 March 1998 – 20 October 1999
- President: Soeharto; B. J. Habibie
- Preceded by: Ida Bagus Sudjana
- Succeeded by: Susilo Bambang Yudhoyono

Personal details
- Born: 14 March 1947 Purwokerto, Central Java, Indonesia
- Died: 17 December 2023 (aged 76) Jakarta, Indonesia
- Education: ITB; Stanford University

Kuntoro Mangkusubroto (14 March 1947 – 17 December 2023) was an Indonesian administrator and politician who was Director-General (1993–97) and Minister (1998–99) in the Indonesian Department of Mines, before being appointed to head the Aceh-Nias Body for Rehabilitation and Reconstruction (BRR) following the devastating 2004 Indian Ocean earthquake and tsunami of 26 December 2004.

== Early life and education ==
Kuntoro Mangkusubroto was born on 14 March 1947, in Purwokerto, Central Java. After a first degree (1972) and the Bandung Institute of Technology (ITB), he did post-graduate work at Stanford University (Master of Civil Engineering, 1977) but returned to ITB for his doctorate (1982).

== Career ==
While teaching at ITB from 1982, he began working in government in 1984, initially in the ministry of the State Secretariat. He gained a reputation for efficiency as CEO of government-owned coal and tin mines in 1984–89.

In 1993, he was appointed Director-General of General Mining, where he gained the respect of both foreign investors and government for efficiency and probity. This led to his appointment as Minister of Mining in the reforming cabinet of President B.J. Habibie in 1998–99.

In 2000, he was appointed CEO of the state-owned Electricity Company, PLN.

The 2004 Indian Ocean earthquake and tsunami in December 2004 was an unprecedented disaster for Indonesia, with some 200,000 dead or missing and a million homeless. It also witnessed record amounts of aid being promised for reconstruction of the affected regions of Aceh and Nias, both internationally and in Indonesia. President Susilo Bambang Yudhoyono controversially decided not to trust the existing government agencies to manage this huge effort, but appointed Kuntoro at Cabinet level to head a new agency to manage the flow of funds and the reconstruction, Badan Rehabilitasi dan Rekonstruksi Aceh-Nias, or BRR. The four years (2005–09)of BRR reconstruction witnessed an unprecedented flow of international and national personnel into a region that had been plagued by insurgency and isolation. The Helsinki Peace Agreement of 2005 meant that BRR had to work with both government and the former separatists of GAM. The two processes were transformative for Aceh.

In October 2009, when BRR had completed its task, Kuntoro was appointed head of the Presidential Unit of Development Supervision and Control (familiarly called UKP4). UKP4 was officially dissolved by President Joko Widodo as of 23 February 2015, based on Presidential Regulation No. 26 of 2015 Article 40 paragraph B. Some of the functions of this institution are merged into the Cabinet Secretariat and the Office of the Presidential Staff.

== Death ==
Mangkusubroto died at Kencana Hospital in Jakarta, on 17 December 2023, at the age of 76. He was buried in Kalibata Heroes' Cemetery.
