= B. J. Habibie =

President of Indonesia from 1998 to 1999

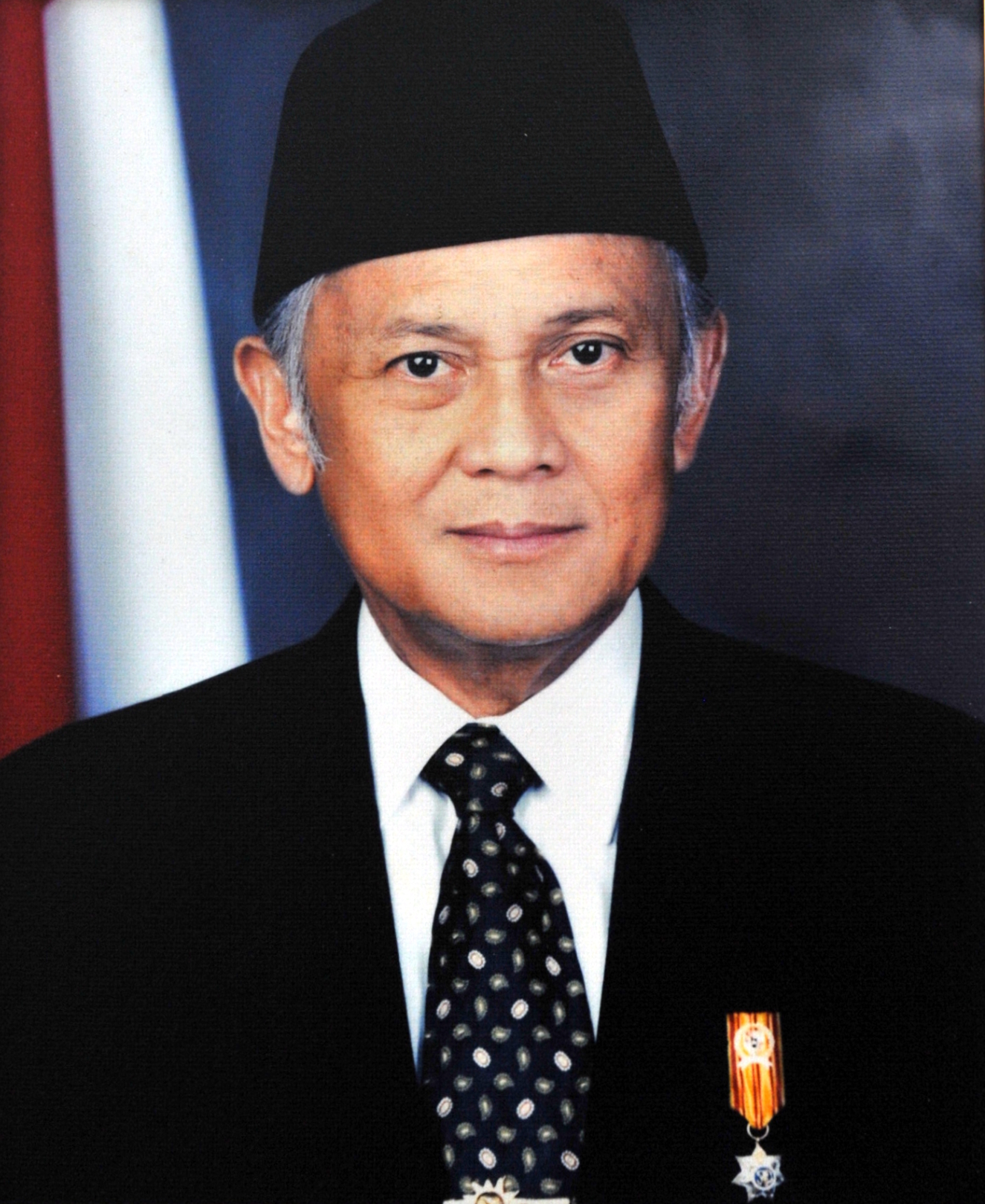
- Official portrait, 1998

3rd President of Indonesia
- In office 21 May 1998 – 20 October 1999
- Vice President: Vacant
- Preceded by: Suharto
- Succeeded by: Abdurrahman Wahid

7th Vice President of Indonesia
- In office 11 March 1998 – 21 May 1998
- President: Suharto
- Preceded by: Try Sutrisno
- Succeeded by: Megawati Sukarnoputri (1999)

State Minister of Research and Technology
- In office 29 March 1978 – 11 March 1998
- President: Suharto
- Preceded by: Sumitro Djojohadikusumo
- Succeeded by: Rahardi Ramelan

Personal details
- Born: Bacharuddin Jusuf Habibie; 25 June 1936 Parepare, Dutch East Indies
- Died: 11 September 2019 (aged 83) Jakarta, Indonesia
- Resting place: Kalibata Heroes' Cemetery
- Party: Golkar
- Height: 162 cm (5 ft 4 in)
- Spouse: Hasri Ainun Besari (m. 1962; died 2010)
- Children: Ilham; Thareq
- Parents: Alwi Abdul Jalil Habibie (father); Tuti Marini Puspowardojo (mother)
- Relatives: Junus Effendi Habibie (brother)
- Occupation: Politician; engineer; scientist
- Known for: Habibie Theorem; Habibie Factor; Habibie Model; IPTN N250 airplane
- Scientific career
- Education: Bandung Institute of Technology (attended); RWTH Aachen University (Dipl.-Ing. and Dr.-Ing.)
- Awards: Edward Warner Award (1994)
- Fields: Aerospace engineering; Civil aviation
- Workplaces: Messerschmitt-Bölkow-Blohm
- Thesis: Beitrag zur Temperaturbeanspruchung der orthotropen Kragscheibe (1965)
- Doctoral advisor: Hans Ebner

- B. J. Habibie's voice Habibie announcing the formation of the Development Reform Cabinet; Recorded 22 May 1998

Bacharuddin Jusuf Habibie (Indonesian: [bahaˌrudin ˌjusuf haˈbibi]; 25 June 1936 – 11 September 2019) was an Indonesian statesman, engineer, scientist and inventor who served as the third president of Indonesia from 1998 to 1999. A little over two months after his inauguration as the seventh vice president in March 1998, he succeeded Suharto, who resigned after 32 years in office, thereby being the country's first vice president to assume the presidency intra-term. Originating from Sulawesi with Bugis-Gorontalese and Javanese ancestry, his presidency was seen as a landmark and transition to the Reform era.

Upon becoming president, he liberalized Indonesia's press and political party laws; ended Indonesian occupation of East Timor, which led to that country's independence; and held an early democratic election three years sooner than scheduled, which resulted in the end of his presidency. His 517-day presidency and 71-day vice-presidency were each the shortest in Indonesian history. Before entering government, Habibie contributed to the making of Indonesia's first domestic airplane, the IPTN N-250. As a result, he was granted the title "Father of Technology".

== Early life and family ==
Habibie was born in Parepare, South Sulawesi. His parents, Alwi Abdul Jalil Habibie, an agriculturist from ethnic Bugis-Gorontalese descent, from Gorontalo, and R. A. Tuti Marini Puspowardojo, a Javanese noblewoman from Yogyakarta, who met while studying in Bogor.

Habibie's paternal family comes from Kabila, just to the east of the town of Gorontalo in northern Sulawesi. He was the fourth of eight children. Habibie's father died when he was 14 years old.

In 2018, the Gorontalo provincial government agreed to support the construction of the B. J. Habibie's Monument in front of the main gate of Djalaluddin Airport in Gorontalo Regency. In addition, it was proposed that State University of Gorontalo be renamed in honour of Habibie although in the end, the suggestion was not adopted.

== Education ==
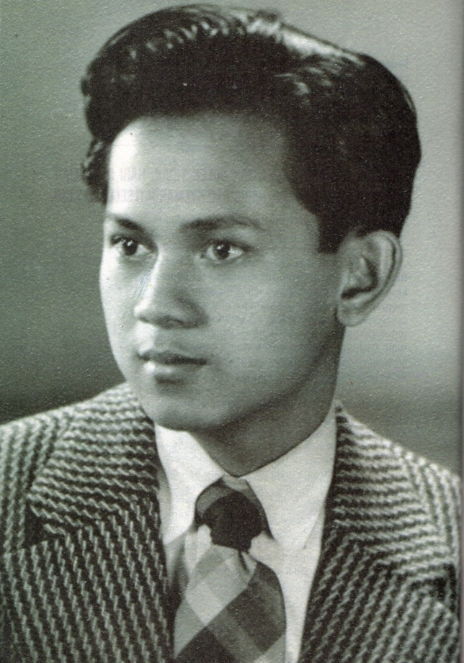
Portrait photo of Habibie during his younger years

Habibie went to Delft, the Netherlands, to study aviation and aerospace at the Technische Hogeschool Delft (Delft University of Technology), but for political reasons (the West New Guinea dispute between the Netherlands and Indonesia), he had to continue his study at the Technische Hochschule Aachen (RWTH Aachen University) in Aachen, Germany. In 1960, Habibie received an engineer's degree in Germany with the title Diplom-Ingenieur. He remained in Germany as a research assistant under Hans Ebner at the Lehrstuhl und Institut für Leichtbau, RWTH Aachen to conduct research for his doctoral degree.

== Engineering career ==
In 1962, Habibie returned to Indonesia for three months on sick leave. During this time, he was reacquainted with Hasri Ainun, the daughter of R. Mohamad Besari. Habibie had known Hasri Ainun in childhood, junior high school and in senior high school at SMA Kristen Dago (Dago Christian Senior High School), Bandung. The two married on 12 May 1962, returning to Germany shortly afterwards. Habibie and his wife settled in Aachen for a short period before moving to Oberforstbach. In May 1963 they had a son, Ilham Akbar Habibie.

Habibie later found employment with the railway stock firm Waggonfabrik Talbot, where he became an advisor in designing train wagons. Due to his work with Makosh, the head of train construction offered his position to Habibie upon retirement three years later, but Habibie refused the position.

In 1965, Habibie delivered his dissertation in aerospace engineering and received the grade of "very good", giving him the title Doktoringenieur (Dr.-Ing.). The same year, he accepted Hans Ebner's offer to continue his research on Thermoelastisitas and work toward his habilitation, but he declined the offer to join RWTH as a professor. His thesis about light construction for supersonic or hypersonic states also attracted offers of employment from companies such as Boeing and Airbus, which Habibie again declined.

Habibie did accept a position with Messerschmitt-Bölkow-Blohm in Hamburg. There, he developed theories on thermodynamics, construction, and aerodynamics known as the Habibie Factor (thermodynamics), Habibie Theorem (construction), and Habibie Method (aerodynamics), respectively. He worked for Messerschmitt on the development of the Airbus A-300B aircraft. In 1974, he was promoted to a middle management position (Leitender Angestellter) of the company.

In 1974, Suharto recruited Habibie to return to Indonesia as part of his drive to industrialize and develop the country. Habibie initially served as a special assistant to Ibnu Sutowo, chief executive officer of the state oil company Pertamina and Chair of Agency for the Assessment and Application of Technology (Indonesian: Badan Pengkajian dan Penerapan Teknologi, BPPT). Two years later, Habibie was made CEO of the new state-owned enterprise Industri Pesawat Terbang Nurtanio (IPTN; Nurtanio Aircraft Industry), which in 1985 changed its name to Industri Pesawat Terbang Nusantara (Nusantara Aircraft Industry; also abbreviated as IPTN) and is known as Indonesian Aerospace (PT. Dirgantara Indonesia) since 2000.

== Political career ==
=== Cabinet minister (1978–1998) ===
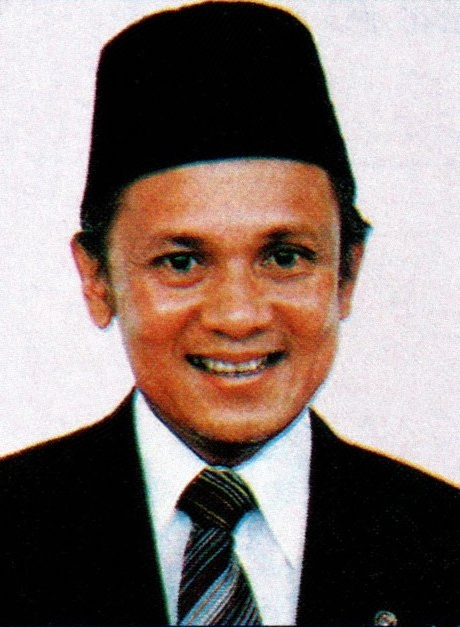
Habibie's official portrait as state minister of research and technology

In 1978, he was appointed as state minister of research and technology (Indonesian: Menteri Negara Riset dan Teknologi, Menristek). He continued to play an important role in IPTN other "strategic" industries in this post. By the 1980s, IPTN had grown considerably, specializing in the manufacture of helicopters and small passenger planes. Under Habibie's leadership, IPTN became a manufacturer of aircraft including Puma helicopters and CASA planes. It pioneered a small passenger airplane, the N-250 Gatotkaca, in 1995, but the project was a commercial failure. In developing Indonesia's aviation industry, he adopted an approach called "Begin at the End and End at the Beginning". In this method, elements such as basic research became the last things upon which to focus, whilst actual manufacturing of the planes was placed as the first objective.

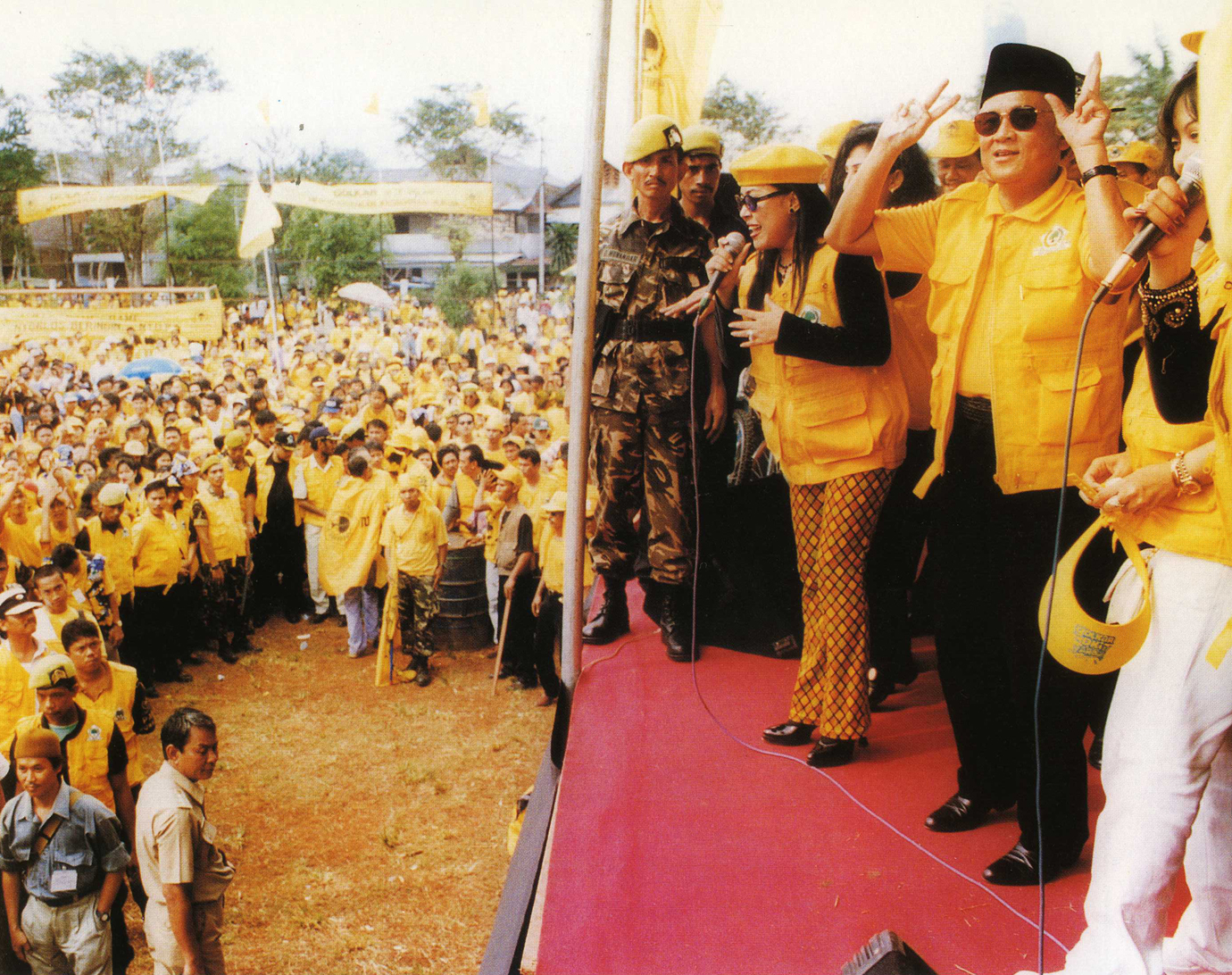
Habibie (centre) campaigning for Golkar in the 1997 election

By 1991, Habibie oversaw ten state-owned industries including ship- and train building, steel, arms, communications, and energy. A 1993 estimate determined that the estimates used nearly $2 billion a year in state funding, although the government's opaque accounting practices meant that the size of the industries was not completely known.

As minister, Habibie created the OFP (Overseas Fellowship Program), STMDP (Science Technology and Manpower Development Program) and STAID (Science and Technology for Industrial Development). These three programs provided scholarships to thousands of high school graduates to earn their bachelor's degrees in the STEM fields and for other technical professionals to continue their study for master's and doctorate programs in the United States, Europe, Japan, and other countries.

In Suharto's regime, as was expected of senior government executives, Habibie became a member of the Golkar organisation. Suharto appointed him as deputy daily coordinator for the chairman of the executive board in 1992, and the following year he became the daily coordinator.

While serving in cabinet, Habibie was also elected as the first Chair of the Indonesian Association of Muslim Intellectuals (ICMI) in 1990. This modernist Muslim organization provided him with a political base, linked to but independent of the Suharto administration.

=== Vice presidency (1998) ===
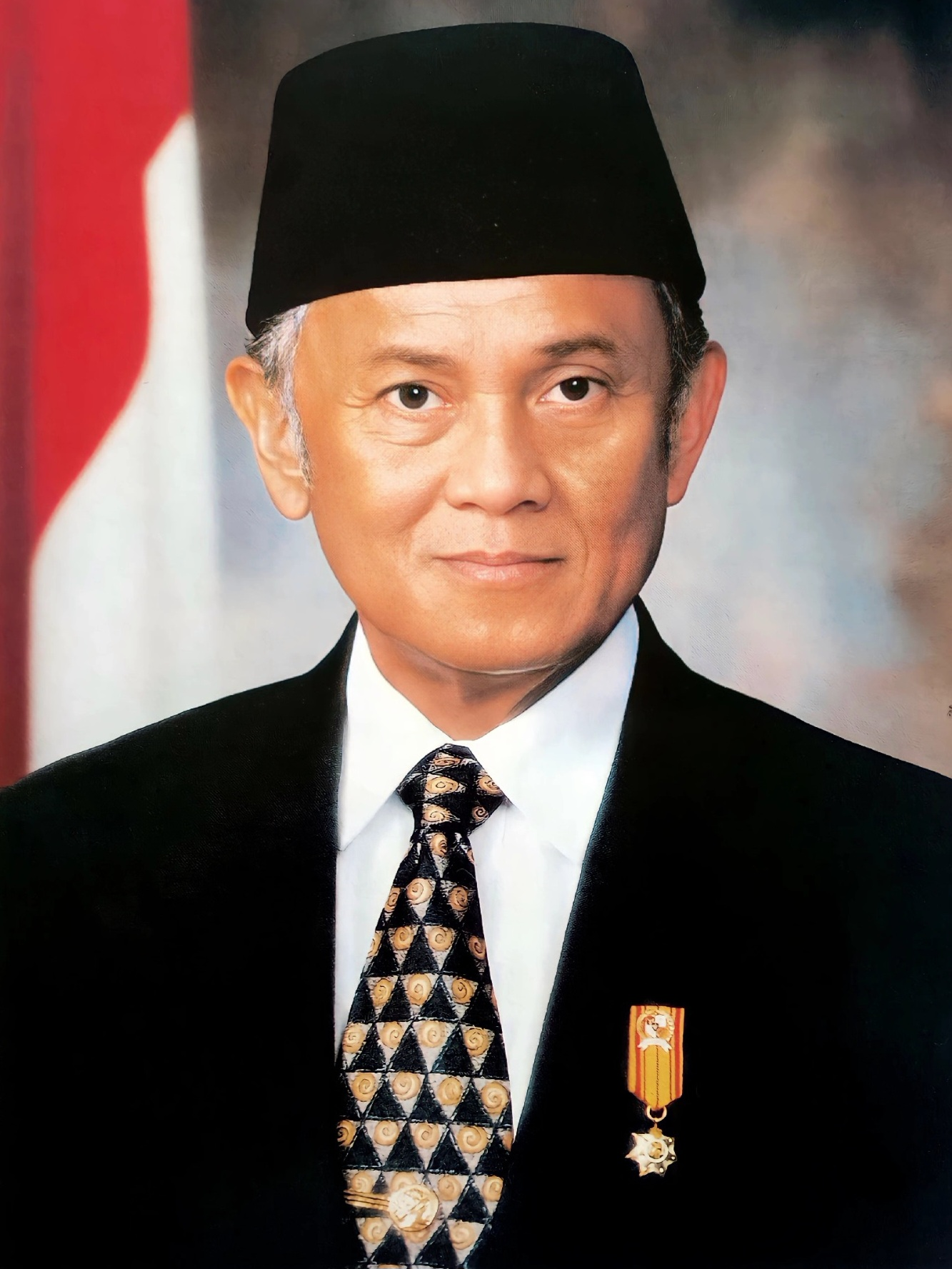
Habibie's official portrait as vice president, BRI 2nd Class featured

In January 1998, after accepting nomination for a seventh term as president, Suharto announced the selection criteria for the nomination of a vice president. Suharto did not mention Habibie by name, but his suggestion that the next vice president should have a mastery of science and technology made it obvious he had Habibie in mind.

In that year, in the midst of the Asian Financial Crisis, this suggestion was received badly, causing the rupiah to fall. Despite this, Habibie was elected as vice president in March 1998.

== Presidency (1998–1999) ==
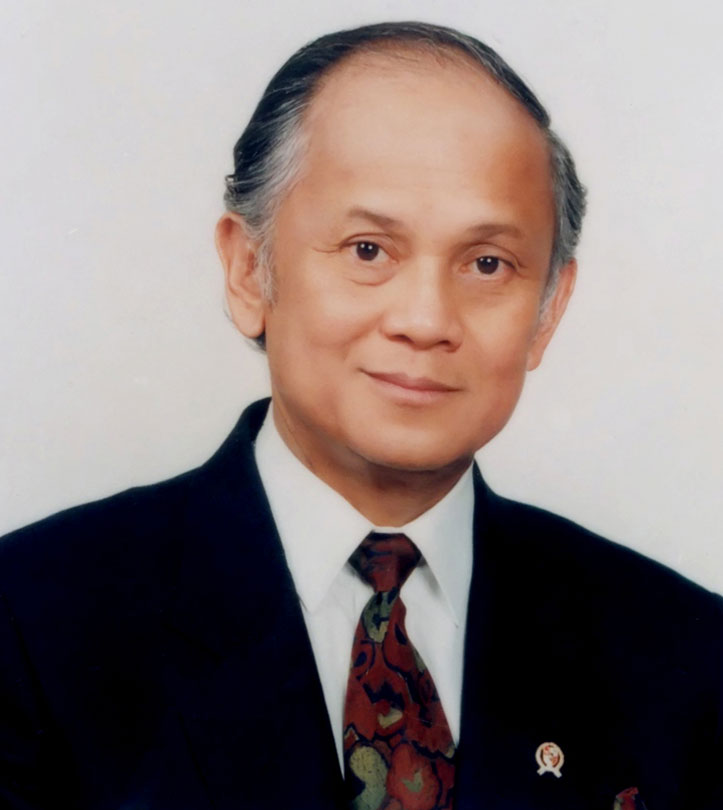
- Presidency of Bacharuddin Jusuf Habibie; 21 May 1998 – 20 October 1999
- Cabinet: Development Reform Cabinet
- Party: Golkar
- Election: 1999
- Seat: Istana Negara
- Seal of the President of Indonesia

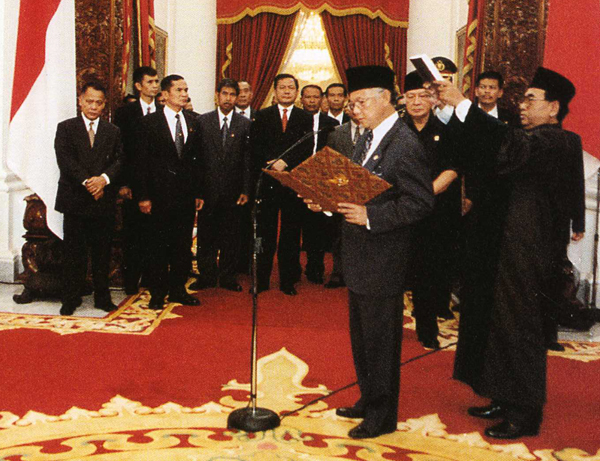
President Habibie taking his presidential oath, 21 May 1998

On 21 May 1998, just two months into Habibie's vice presidency, Suharto announced his resignation. Habibie, as the Constitution says, succeeded him as president. The following day, Habibie announced the Development Reform Cabinet, which removed some of the most controversial ministers in Suharto's last cabinet while maintaining others, with no major figures from the opposition. Within days of his appointment, he asked his relatives to resign from government positions, promised an early election, repealed some legislation, and ordered the release of political prisoners.

=== East Timor referendum ===
Habibie was opposed to East Timorese independence but did offer East Timor special autonomy.

Timorese independence forces led by the National Council of Timorese Resistance had been calling for a referendum in the territory for some time. Its chief diplomat, José Ramos-Horta, proposed a transitional period of autonomy leading up to a referendum. In late 1998, John Howard, the Prime Minister of Australia, sent a letter to Habibie suggesting that Indonesia defuse the East Timorese issue by providing autonomy to be followed by the promise of a referendum in the long run, following the method used by France to settle New Caledonian demands for independence. Wishing to avoid the impression that Indonesia ruled East Timor as a colony, Habibie surprised some by announcing that a referendum, offering a choice between special autonomy and independence, would be held immediately in East Timor. Leaders of the Indonesian armed forces (ABRI) were not consulted on this decision.

On 30 August 1999, the referendum was held and the East Timorese people overwhelmingly chose independence. Subsequently, pro-Indonesian militias killed and displaced large numbers of people during the 1999 East Timorese crisis. On 10 September, General Wiranto allegedly threatened to stage a military coup if Habibie allowed in peacekeeping forces, causing Habibie to back down. On 12 September, however, Habibie accepted a UN-mandated peacekeeping force to halt violence. A period of UN administration followed and East Timor became independent in May 2002.

=== Suharto's corruption charge ===
The MPR Special Session in November 1998 decried the presence of corruption in Indonesia, focusing particularly on Suharto. In response to this, Habibie then appointed Andi Muhammad Ghalib as Attorney General. A tape of a telephone conversation between Habibie and Ghalib was made public. It raised concerns about the veracity of the investigation by suggesting that the interrogation of Suharto was intended only for public appearances.

Under Habibie, the Indonesian government also began investigating and prosecuting Suharto's youngest son, Hutomo Mandala Putra (commonly known as Tommy Suharto). Ghalib charged Tommy in December 1998 in conjunction with the Goro scandal, where the government, under pressure from Tommy, allegedly gave him a desirable parcel and below-market loan for the construction of a Goro supermarket. However, Tommy was found innocent in the case after several key witnesses, including Habibie aide Rahardi Ramelan, changed their testimony and declared that the deal did not cause losses to the state.

=== Economy and the Chinese Indonesians ===
Habibie's government stabilized the economy in the face of the Asian financial crisis and the chaos of the last few months of Suharto's presidency. Habibie's government began to make conciliatory gestures towards Chinese-Indonesians who, because of their elite status, were targeted in the riots of 1998. In September 1998, Habibie issued a 'Presidential Instruction' forbidding use of the terms pribumi and non-pribumi to differentiate indigenous and non-indigenous Indonesians.

In May 1999, Habibie directed that an ID card was sufficient proof of Indonesian citizenship, revoking the previous requirement for a 'Letter of Evidence of Republic of Indonesia Citizenship' (SBKRI). Additionally, he lifted restrictions on the teaching of Mandarin Chinese.

=== Political reform ===
Under Habibie, Indonesia made significant changes to its political system that expanded competition and freedom of speech. Shortly after taking office, in June 1998, Habibie's government lifted the Suharto-era restriction on political parties and ended censorship by dissolving the Information Ministry. He also quickly committed to holding democratic elections, albeit on an initially vague timetable. In December, he proposed political reform laws that were passed by the legislature and MPR. These laws set elections for December 1999, reduced the number of seats in parliament held by the military, and barred political activity by civil servants.

However, political opponents criticized Habibie for allowing the military to retain some seats in parliament, and taking little action on other military and judicial reforms.

Habibie's government also passed laws which granted significant autonomy to regional governments, namely at the regency and city level. The laws resulted in indirect elections for mayors and regents, and allowed local legislatures to hold said executives accountable, though it was not implemented until after his presidency.

=== End of presidency ===
Although he had been viewed as leading a transitional government, Habibie seemed determined to continue as president. He was initially unclear about whether he would seek a full term as president when he announced parliamentary elections in June 1998. Habibie faced opposition from many within the government party, Golkar; in July 1998, he struggled to win control of Golkar by appointing Akbar Tandjung as chair of the party, but was ultimately able to defeat a rival camp including former vice president Try Sutrisno, defense minister Edi Sudradjat, Siswono Yudo Husodo, and Sarwono Kusumaatmadja. Habibie began to lose support from Akbar Tandjung and a faction in Golkar, composed of both reformers and hardliners, that wanted to oust him. In March 1999, Golkar put forth five presidential nominees: Habibie, Tandjung, Wiranto, Hamengkubuwono X, and Ginandjar Kartasasmita. In May 1999, after extensive lobbying, Golkar announced that Habibie would be their presidential candidate, but a large faction in the party remained loyal to Tandjung and opposed to Habibie. His political credibility was tarnished by the exposure of the 1999 Bank Bali scandal, in which banking funds were funneled to members of Habibie's re-election team.

At the 1999 MPR General Session in October, Habibie delivered an accountability speech. This was a tradition carried on from Suharto, in which he outlined the achievements of his tenure and showed how he had adhered to the Broad Lines of State Policy drafted by the MPR. Under the Constitution at the time, the MPR was responsible for developing the Broad Lines of State Policy. The president, in turn, was responsible for implementing them as the "mandatory" of the MPR. Afterward, MPR members then began voting to either accept or reject his speech. Habibie attempted to win the support of the military by offering the vice presidency to General Wiranto, but his offer was declined. After Tandjung's Golkar faction broke ranks and voted against him, Habibie's accountability speech was rejected by 355 votes to 322. Realizing that his position was untenable, Habibie withdrew his nomination as president. He was succeeded by Abdurrahman Wahid.

== Post-presidency (1999–2019) ==
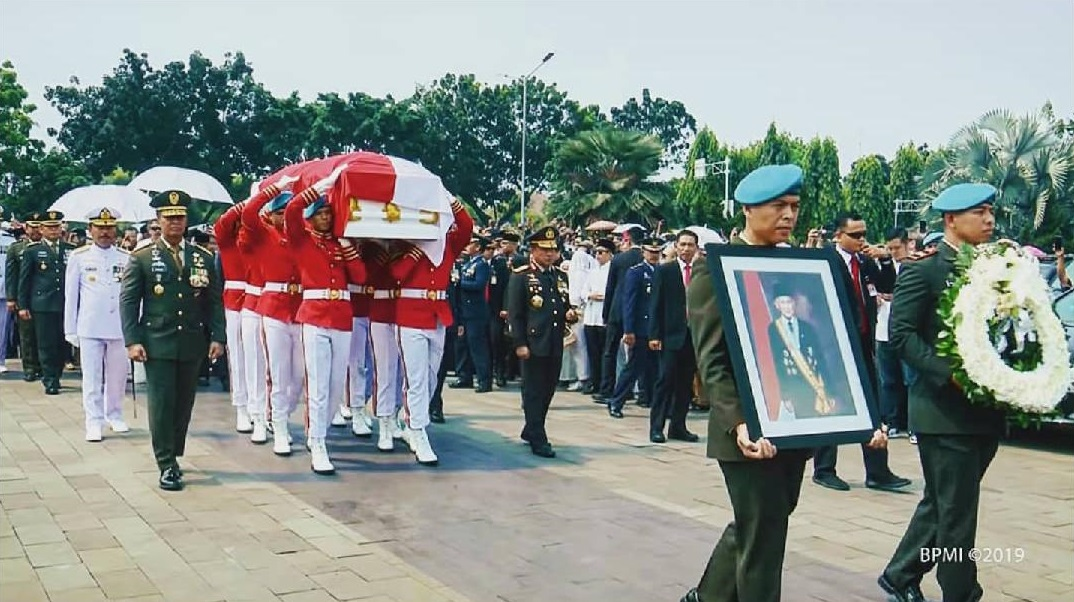
State funeral procession of Habibie at the Kalibata Heroes' Cemetery in Jakarta, 12 September 2019

=== Post-presidency activities ===
After relinquishing the presidency, Habibie spent more time in Germany than in Indonesia, though he was active during Susilo Bambang Yudhoyono's presidency as a presidential adviser. During this time, he established the Habibie Centre, an independent think tank.

In September 2006, he released a book called Detik-Detik Yang Menentukan: Jalan Panjang Indonesia Menuju Demokrasi (Decisive Moments: Indonesia's Long Road Towards Democracy). The book recalled the events of May 1998, which led to his rise to the presidency. In the book, he controversially accused Lieutenant General Prabowo Subianto, Suharto's son-in-law (at that time) and the Kostrad Commander, of planning a coup d'état against him in May 1998.

=== Illness and death ===
In early September 2019, he was admitted to Gatot Soebroto Army Hospital, where he was undergoing treatments for heart problems, namely cardiomyopathy, and died on 11 September 2019. He became the first president of Indonesia to be buried at the Kalibata Heroes' Cemetery, next to his wife's grave.

In response to his death, the Government of Indonesia announced a three-day national mourning period starting on 12 September, and announced that the Indonesian flag is to be flown at half-staff during the period.

Malaysian prime minister Mahathir Mohamad was saddened by the loss of his old friend, Habibie. He described his demise as a considerable loss.

On 12 September 2019, a video was released showing East Timor's former president, Xanana Gusmão, visiting Habibie in hospital on 22 July 2019. Gusmão is shown talking briefly to Habibie while crying, then kissing Habibie on the forehead and lowering his face to Habibie's chest, with the other holding his head. A wreath in Gusmão's name was at the funeral, with a sign reading: "Profound Condolences - With heartfelt sympathy for the loss of Big Brother President B.J. Habibie - Timorese people will remember you forever - Rest in Peace - Xanana Gusmão."

== Personal life ==
Habibie was married to Hasri Ainun Besari, a medical doctor, from 12 May 1962 until her death on 22 May 2010. Their wedding was held according to Javanese and Gorontalese culture. The couple had two sons, Ilham Akbar Habibie and Thareq Kemal Habibie.

B. J. Habibie's brother, Junus Effendi Habibie, was Indonesian ambassador to the United Kingdom and the Netherlands. After his wife's death, Habibie published a book titled Habibie & Ainun which recounts his relationship with Hasri Ainun from their courtship until her death. The book was adapted into a film of the same name which was released on 20 December 2012.

== Honours ==
Habibie received several honorary degrees for his contributions in the fields of technology and science, e.g. he was awarded an honorary DSc degree from the Cranfield Institute of Technology (United Kingdom) and Dr. (H.C.) degrees from Chungbuk National University and Hankuk University of Foreign Studies (South Korea) for his services to aircraft technology. In 2010, Habibie was honored with an Honorary PhD degree in technology by the University of Indonesia for his contribution to science in practice as a technocrat.

Habibie was appointed a Fellow of the Royal Academy of Engineering (FREng) in 1990. In 1993, he was awarded an Honorary Fellow of the Royal Aeronautical Society (HonFRAeS). He was also named an honorary member of several professional bodies, including:

- Malaysian Engineers Association (IEM)
- Japanese Academy of Engineering
- Fellowship of Engineering of the United Kingdom, London
- National Academy of Engineering, USA
- Academie Nationale de l'Air et de l'Espace, France
- Royal Aeronautical Society, UK
- Royal Swedish Academy of Engineering Science
- Deutsche Gesellschaft für Luft- und Raumfahrt (German Institute for Aviation & Space), Germany
- American Institute of Aeronautics and Astronautics, USA

=== National honours ===
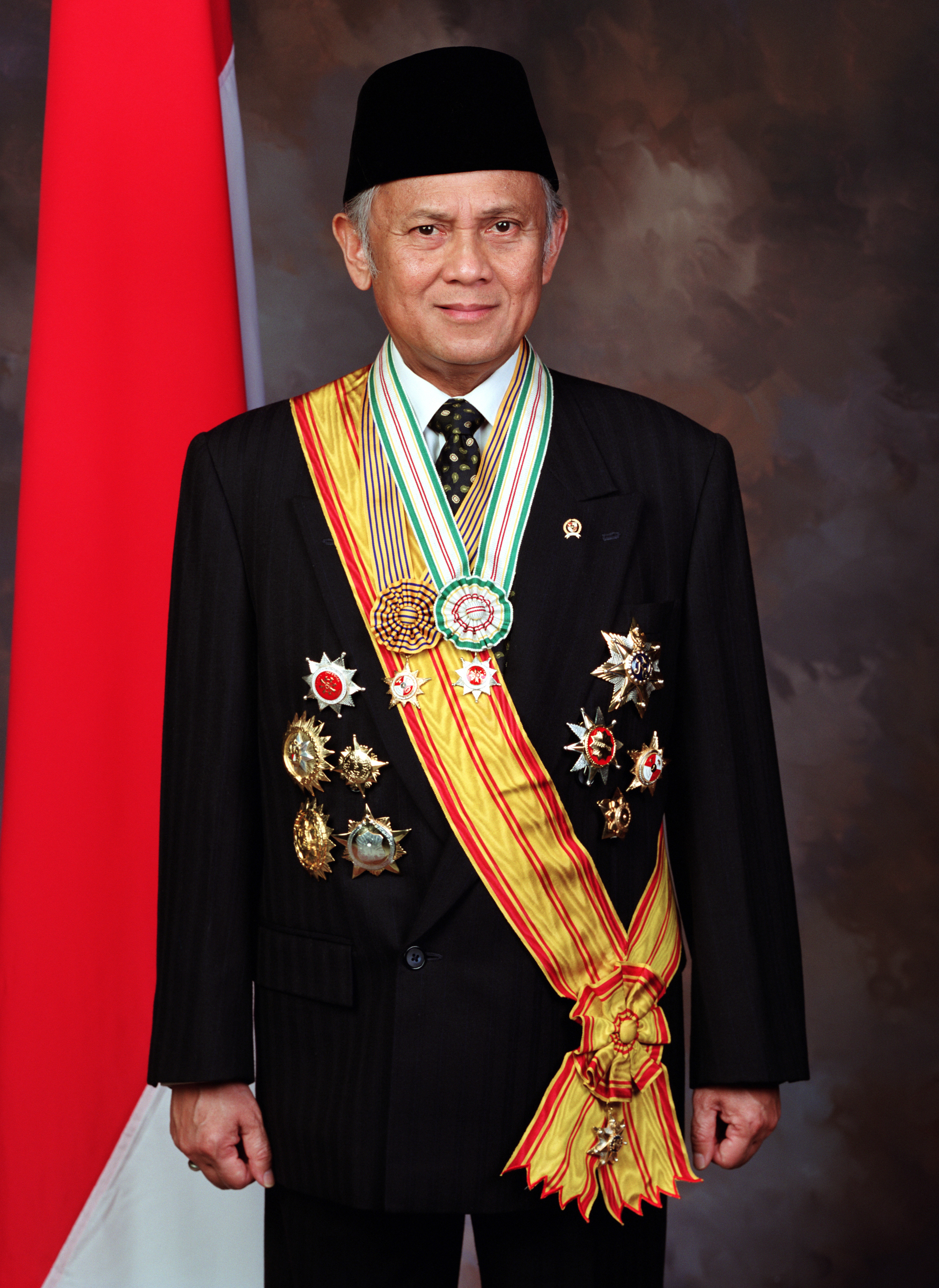
Habibie's official state portrait with his presidential decorations

As vice president, and later president of Indonesia, he was automatically bestowed the highest class of all civilian and military Star Decorations from Indonesia, namely:

- Star of the Republic of Indonesia, 1st Class (Indonesian: Bintang Republik Indonesia Adipurna) (27 May 1998)
- Star of the Republic of Indonesia, 2nd Class (Indonesian: Bintang Republik Indonesia Adipradana) (12 March 1998)
- Star of Mahaputera, 1st Class (Indonesian: Bintang Mahaputera Adipurna) (12 March 1998)
- Star of Mahaputera, 2nd Class (Indonesian: Bintang Mahaputera Adipradana) (17 August 1982)
- Star of Merit, 1st Class (Indonesian: Bintang Jasa Utama) (27 May 1998)
- Star of Culture Parama Dharma (Indonesian: Bintang Budaya Parama Dharma) (27 May 1998)
- Star of Yudha Dharma, 1st Class (Indonesian: Bintang Yudha Dharma Utama) (27 May 1998)
- Star of Kartika Eka Paksi, 1st Class (Indonesian: Bintang Kartika Eka Paksi Utama) (27 May 1998)
- Star of Jalasena, 1st Class (Indonesian: Bintang Jalasena Utama) (27 May 1998)
- Star of Swa Bhuwana Paksa, 1st Class (Indonesian: Bintang Swa Bhuwana Paksa Utama) (27 May 1998)
- Star of Bhayangkara, 1st Class (Indonesian: Bintang Bhayangkara Utama) (27 May 1998)
- Military Instructor Service Medal (Indonesian: Satyalancana Dwidya Sistha) (9 August 1982)

=== Foreign honours ===
In addition, he also received several foreign decorations:
Austria:

- Grand Decoration of Honour in Gold of the Decoration of Honour for Services to the Republic of Austria (1996)

Belgium:

- Grand Cross of the Order of Leopold II (10 April 1991)

Brazil:

- Grand Cross of the Order of the Southern Cross (2010)

Chile:

- Grand Cross of Aeronautical Merit (3 October 1985)

France:

- Grand Officer of the Legion of Honour (4 June 1997)
- Grand Cross of the National Order of Merit (September 1986)

Germany:

- Grand Cross 1st Class of the Order of Merit of the Federal Republic of Germany (15 July 1997)
- Grand Cross with Star and Sash of the Order of Merit of the Federal Republic of Germany (11 November 1980)
  - Lower Saxony:
    - Commander's Cross (Großes Verdienstkreuz) of the Lower Saxony Order of Merit (1 December 1980)

Italy:

- Knight Grand Cross of the Order of Merit of the Italian Republic (16 June 1987)

Japan:

- Grand Cordon of the Order of the Paulownia Flowers (1998)

Jordan:

- Grand Cordon of the Order of Independence (Wisam al-Istiqial) (14 April 1986)

Netherlands:

- Knight Grand Cross of the Order of Orange-Nassau (25 May 1983)

Spain:

- Grand Cross of the Order of Civil Merit (24 April 1987)
- Grand Cross of Aeronautical Merit with White Decoration (14 May 1980)

Taiwan

- Grand Cordon of the Order of Brilliant Star (10 June 1994)

=== Places and statue ===
There is several places, especially in Sulawesi where he came from, that bear his name. In Parepare, a monument called Monumen Cinta Sejati Habibie Ainun (Habibie Ainun True Love Monument) featuring statue of him and Ainun was dedicated by himself at his 53rd wedding anniversary in 2015. Gelora Mandiri Stadium in the city was renamed into Gelora B.J. Habibie Stadium in 2019, shortly after his death. His former house in Parepare is converted into a presidential museum that opened in 2020. In 2022, the new B.J. Habibie Floating Mosque in Parepare was opened to the public.

In Gorontalo Regency, there is a monument of Habibie located nearby Jalaluddin Airport built by Gorontalo provincial government.

In memory of Habibie, the government of Timor-Leste named a bridge in the city of Dili B. J. Habibie Bridge shortly after Habibie died.

== In popular culture ==
Habibie has been portrayed in several biopic movies based on both his political and personal life. In the first installment of Habibie & Ainun (2012) and its prequels, Rudy Habibie (2016) and Habibie & Ainun 3 (2019), Habibie was portrayed by Reza Rahadian, while Bima Azriel and Bastian Bintang Simbolon portrayed Habibie during his childhood, and teenage years in Rudy Habibie respectively. In the movie Di Balik 98, Habibie was portrayed by Agus Kuncoro.

Political offices
Preceded by Suharto	President of Indonesia; 21 May 1998 – 20 October 1999	Succeeded by Abdurrahman Wahid
Preceded by Try Sutrisno	Vice President of Indonesia; 11 March 1998 – 21 May 1998	Succeeded by Megawati Sukarnoputri
Preceded by Sumitro Djojohadikusumo	State Minister of Research and Technology; 1978–1998	Succeeded by Rahardi Ramelan
Government offices
New office	Head of Agency for the Assessment and Application of Technology; 1974–1998	Succeeded by Rahardi Ramelan
