= Jan Samuel Maringka =

Indonesian politician (born 1963)

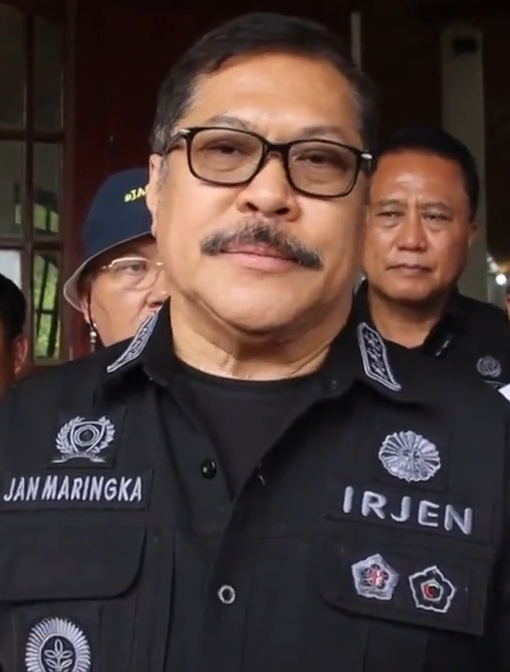

Inspector General of the Ministry of Agriculture
- In office 30 March 2022 – 10 November 2023
- President: Joko Widodo
- Minister: Syahrul Yasin Limpo; Amran Sulaiman
- Preceded by: Justan R. Siahaan
- Succeeded by: Setyo Budiyanto

Junior Attorney General for Intelligence Affairs
- In office 15 November 2017 – 12 August 2020
- Preceded by: Adi Toegarisman
- Succeeded by: Sunarta

Attorney General of South Sulawesi
- In office 22 February 2017 – 15 November 2017
- Preceded by: Hidayatullah
- Succeeded by: Tarmizi

Attorney General of Maluku
- In office 11 December 2015 – 22 February 2017
- Preceded by: Chuck Suryosumpeno
- Succeeded by: Manumpak Pane

District Attorney of Serang
- In office 6 August 2010 – 23 March 2012
- Preceded by: Amandra S.A.
- Succeeded by: Sudarwidadi

Personal details
- Born: 11 October 1963 (age 62) Jakarta, Indonesia
- Spouse: Nina C.H. Maringka
- Parents: Henry E. Maringka (father); Johana Mahieu (mother)
- Education: Krisnadwipayana University; IBLAM Law School; Hasanuddin University

Jan Samuel Maringka (born 11 October 1963) is an Indonesian prosecutor who served as the Inspector General of the Ministry of Agriculture from 2022 to 2023. Prior to his appointment in the ministry, Jan held various positions in the public prosecution service, including as the chief of prosecutor of Maluku from 2015 to 2017, chief prosecutors of South Sulawesi in 2017, and the junior attorney general for intelligence from 2017 to 2020.

== Early life and education ==
Maringka was born in Jakarta on 11 October 1963 as the son of Henry E. Maringka and Johana Mahieu. He completed his high school at the Jakarta 43rd High School from 1980 until 1983. He then studied law at the Krisnadwipayana University and graduated in 1988. During his time in university, Maringka joined Krisnadwipayana's student regiment.

Maringka continued to study law during his career as prosecutor. He received his master's degree from the Krisnadwipayana Law School in 2003 and Doctor of Law from the Hasanuddin University in 2015, with his doctoral thesis titled Strengthening Extradition in the Criminal Justice System with Consideration on Foreign Jurisdiction.

Maringka has also attended several professional courses, such as a course on commercial law in Australia in 1995, training for corruption investigator in held by the International Law Enforcement Academy of Bangkok in 1999, transnational organized crimes training by United Nations Asia and Far East Institute for the Prevention of Crime and the Treatment of Offenders in Japan in 2001, International Visitor Leadership Program in 2009, and leadership courses by the National Resilience Institute in 2015 and National Administrative Body in 2017.

== Prosecutor career ==
=== District attorney and attache ===
Upon receiving his law degree, Maringka entered the public prosecution service. He began his career as a prosecutor at the North Jakarta district attorney's office. He was appointed as the district attorney of Tarakan in East Kalimantan in 2003. Two years later, the attorney general assigned him to the consulate general in Hong Kong as a legal attache. During his time in Hong Kong, Maringka chaired the union of Christian Indonesian citizens in Hong Kong. He returned to Indonesia in 2008 and headed the international cooperation section in the attorney general's office.

Maringka became district attorney once again when he was appointed for the position in Serang, Banten, on 6 August 2010. Maringka was involved in the resolution of a conflict between Sunni Islam santris and Ahmadiyya followers in Cileusik. He also oversaw the arrests of several prominent Banten officials for corruption allegations, such as Banten's education chief, regional secretary, and an official from the politics and municipal police unit. Maringka ended his term as district attorney on 23 March 2012.

Maringka returned to the attorney general's office as assistant for general affairs in 2012. Attorney general Basrief Arief was replaced by Muhammad Prasetyo, who then promoted Maringka to become chief of legal and international relations bureau on that year.

=== Provincial Chief Prosecutors ===
Less than a year later, on 11 December 2015 Prasetyo appointed Maringka as the attorney general of Maluku. One of the notable cases he handled during his one and a half year of tenure was the case of Bank Maluku's general director, Idris Rolobessy, who expropriated bank funds for personal purposes. Maringka also formed of anti-illegal levy task forces in all district attorney offices in Maluku. Several days before leaving office, Maringka ceased the prosecution of the alleged corruption case of former East Seram regent, Abdullah Vanath, due to a lack of evidence.

Maringka left Maluku for South Sulawesi in 2017. He served the attorney general for South and West Sulawesi from 22 February until 15 November 2017. As the attorney general for nine months, he oversaw projects worth a total of 6.7 trillion rupiahs, recovered 113 billion rupiahs for the state, and initiated the Prosecutor Greetings radio program, which was nationally adopted. Maringka also appointed a liaison prosecutor for West Sulawesi in preparation for the establishment of an attorney general's office.

=== Junior attorney general ===
On 15 November 2017, Muhammad Prasetyo appointed Maringka as the junior attorney general for intelligence affairs. During his tenure, the prosecutor's intelligence team, led by Maringka, arrested Stefanus Nurtjahja, who dining at a restaurant in Central Jakarta. Nurtjahja was involved in the Bank Century money laundering case totaling up to 1.1 billion rupiahs. Maringka also signed a memorandum of understanding with the Angkasa Pura transport company regarding coordination on air transportation projects and initiated a hotline for regional chiefs to report local prosecutors who obstructed the development of local projects.

On 12 August 2020, amidst the investigation of the Djoko Tjandra embezzlement case, attorney general Sanitiar Burhanuddin dismissed Maringka from his position of deputy attorney general. The dismissal sparked allegations regarding the involvement of Maringka in the case, which was denied by Burhanuddin. Burhanuddin claimed that the dismissal was part of a personnel regeneration and regular rotation. Attorney general spokesperson Hari Setyono stated that the rotation had been planned far before the case had begun.

The connection was later proven in September 2020, when the coordinator of Indonesian Society Against Corruption, Boyamin Saiman, requested the Prosecutor's Commission to investigate Jan Maringka. As reported by Tempo, Jan Maringka had already notified Burhanuddin regarding the presence of Djoko Tjandra in Indonesia, but Burhanuddin did not respond. After the case became public, Burhanuddin gave Djoko Tjandra's number to Maringka. Maringka then called Djoko Tjandra several times, with the last phone call being made on 4 July, twenty-six days before Djoko Tjandra's arrest. In the phone call, Maringka requested Djoko to surrender himself, while Djoko told Maringka about the case, including his relations with the key figures of the case. Maringka later confirmed that he had called Djoko Tjandra several times but claimed that Djoko Tjandra was still being searched and was abroad at the time of the call. Burhanuddin claimed that he never gave Djoko's number to Maringka, although he admitted having instructed Maringka to search for Djoko Tjandra.

=== Inspector general ===
Maringka became an expert staff at the attorney general's office after being dismissed from his office. In early 2022, Maringka was asked by agriculture minister Syahrul Yasin Limpo to become inspector general at the ministry. Maringka had maintained good relations with Limpo since 2017, when Maringka was South Sulawesi's attorney general and Limpo as governor. Maringka was installed for the post on 30 March 2022. During his tenure, Maringka introduced the Jaga Pangan (food guard) program, a reorientation of the internal supervision system within the agriculture ministry aimed at improving Indonesia's food security.

In October 2023, Syahrul Yasin Limpo resigned after being investigated for corruption case. Maringka followed suit by resigning in November that year, citing retirement as his reason. Limpo's aide-de-camp later testified in a court hearing in April 2024 that Maringka was ordered by Limpo to coordinate with the Corruption Eradication Commission regarding the corruption investigation. Maringka denied the claim, suggesting the order might have been for the acting inspector general before him, Kasdi Subagyono.

== Political career ==
After retiring from bureaucracy, Maringka became an advisor to an organization of Joko Widodo supporters. Maringka announced his intentions to run for the 2024 legislative elections and the 2024 North Sulawesi gubernatorial elections. Maringka ran as a Perindo Party candidate for the People's Representative Council from the South Sulawesi 1 electoral district, covering the capital Makassar and five other regencies.

In October 2023, Maringka announced his withdrawal from the legislative election, as his civil servant status was still active in the government registration. However, due to administrative faults, the election commission received his withdrawal in February 2024, long after the ballots had been printed. Maringka received zero votes in the election, becoming the only candidate in his electoral district to do so.

In March 2024, Maringka registered himself as a potential candidate for North Sulawesi's governor from the Gerindra Party.

== Organization career ==
Maringka is a member of several professional organizations, such as the Union of Indonesian Prosecutors, International Association of Prosecutors (IAP), International Association of Anti-Corruption Agencies (IAACA), and the deputy chairman of the Krisnadwipayana University's board of trustees.

Maringka is also involved in customary and traditional organizations. In 2017, as the attorney general of South Sulawesi, Maringka received the honorary title of Putu Lambeng (going up) from the Ammatoa people in Bulukumba Regency. Maringka was also the deputy chief advisor of the Kawanua Brotherhood Union (KKK, Kerukunan Keluarga Kawanua).

== Personal life ==
Maringka is married to Nina C.H. Maringka and has a child.

== Works ==
- Surachman; Maringka, Jan S. (2015). Peran Jaksa dalam Sistem Peradilan Pidana di Kawasan Asia Pasifik. Jakarta: Sinar Grafika. ISBN 9789790076242.
- Surachman; Maringka, Jan S. (2015). Eksistensi Kejaksaan Dalam Konstitusi di Berbagai Negara. Jakarta: Sinar Grafika. ISBN 978-979-007-625-9.
- Maringka, Jan S. (2015). "Penguatan Kejaksaan Secara Kelembagaan Melalui Amandemen UUD NRI 1995". Bunga Rampai Kejaksaan Republik Indonesia. Badan Penerbit Fakultas Hukum Universitas Indonesia: 173–202.
- Maringka, Jan S. (2017). Reformasi Kejaksaan dalam Sistem Hukum Nasional. Jakarta: Sinar Grafika. ISBN 9789790077287.
- Maringka, Jan S. (2018). Ekstradisi Dalam Sistem Peradilan Pidana. Jakarta: Sinar Grafika. ISBN 978-979-007-776-8.
