= First Commission of the House of Representatives of Indonesia =

First Commission of the House of Representatives
- Komisi I Dewan Perwakilan Rakyat Republik Indonesia
- Coat of arms of the People's Representative Council
- Chairperson: Meutya Hafid
- Vice Chairperson: Utut Adianto; Bambang Kristiono; Anton Sukartono Suratto; Abdul Almasyhari
- Parent organization: House of Representatives

First Commission of the House of Representatives (Indonesian: Komisi I Dewan Perwakilan Rakyat Republik Indonesia), more commonly known as First Commission (Komisi I), is one of eleven commissions within the House of Representatives of Indonesia. The commission has the scope of tasks in the fields of defense, foreign affairs, communications and informatics, and intelligence.

== Legal basis ==
1. Law Number 17 of 2014 concerning the People's Consultative Assembly, the People's Representative Council, the Regional Representative Council, and the Regional People's Representative Council.
2. Regulation of the House of Representatives of the Republic of Indonesia Number 1 of 2014 concerning Orders jo. DPR RI Regulation Number 3 of 2015 concerning Amendments to the Regulation of the House of Representatives of the Republic of Indonesia Number 1 of 2014.

== Duties ==
Like other commissions, the First Commission has duties in the fields of:

1. Legislating
2. Budgeting
3. Superivision

== Working partners ==
Based on the Decree of the People's Representative Council of the Republic of Indonesia Number: 3/DPR RI/IV/2014-2015 Concerning the Re-Establishment of the Working Partners of the DPR RI Commissions for the 2014-2019 Membership Period, dated June 23, 2015. Furthermore, the Plenary Meeting of the DPR RI on November 24, 2015 determined the Maritime Security Agency (Bakamla) to be the Working Partner of Commission I of the DPR RI. On October 17, 2017, the Plenary Meeting of the DPR RI also determined the National Cyber and Crypto Agency (BSSN) to be the Working Partner of Commission I of the DPR RI. BSSN is a transformation of Lemsaneg (Presidential Regulation of the Republic of Indonesia Number 133 of 2017 concerning Amendments to Presidential Regulation Number 53 of 2017 concerning the National Cyber and Crypto Agency), so that with the existence of BSSN the Lemsaneg institution can be declared to no longer exist and the Working Partners of Commission I of the DPR RI become as follows:

1. Ministry of Defense (Kemenhan)
2. Ministry of Foreign Affairs (Kemenlu)
3. Ministry of Communications and Informatics (Kemenkominfo)
4. Indonesian National Armed Forces (TNI)
5. State Intelligence Agency (BIN)
6. National Cyber and Crypto Agency (BSSN)
7. National Resilience Institute (Lemhamnas)
8. Indonesian Maritime Security Agency (Bakamla)
9. National Resilience Council (Wantannas)
10. Televisi Republik Indonesia (TVRI)
11. Radio Republik Indonesia (RRI)
12. Local public broadcasting institutions (LPP)
13. Privately owned broadcasting channels
14. Privately owned Islamic broadcasting channels
15. Privately owned radio channels
16. Privately owned Islamic radio channels
17. National news agencies
18. Local news agencies
19. International news agencies
20. Press Council
21. Indonesian Broadcasting Commission (KPI)
22. Central Information Commission (KI Pusat)
23. Film Censorship Agency (LSF)
24. Antara

== Membership ==
=== Composition ===
There are 53 members of First Commission, with the following composition:

==== Leadership ====
Chairman	Vice Chairman	Vice Chairman	Vice Chairman	Vice Chairman
Meutya Hafid Golkar	Utut Adianto PDI-P	Bambang Kristiono Gerindra	Anton Sukartono Suratto Democrat	Abdul Almasyhari PKS

==== Members ====
#	Name	Photo	Constituency	Party	Notes
1	Puan Maharani		Central Java V	PDI-P	Currently serving as Speaker of the People's Representative Council; Daughter of former president Megawati Sukarnoputri; Granddaughter of former president Sukarno
2	Dede Indra Permana Soediro		Central Java X	PDI-P	
3	Junico BP Siahaan		West Java I	PDI-P	
4	Effendi Muara Sakti Simbolon		Jakarta III	PDI-P	
5	Rudianto Tjen		Bangka Belitung	PDI-P	
6	Tubagus Hasanuddin		West Java IX	PDI-P	Brother of Sanitiar Burhanuddin
7	Sturman Panjaitan		Riau islands	PDI-P	
8	Mukhlis Basri		Lampung I	PDI-P	
9	Krisantus Kurniawan		West Kalimantan II	PDI-P	
10	Irine Yusiana Roba Putri		North Maluku	PDI-P	
11	Itet Tridjajati Sumarijanto		Lampung II	PDI-P	
12	Dave Akbarshah Fikarno		West Java VIII	PDI-P	
