= Meutya Hafid =

Indonesian politician

Meutya Viada Hafid
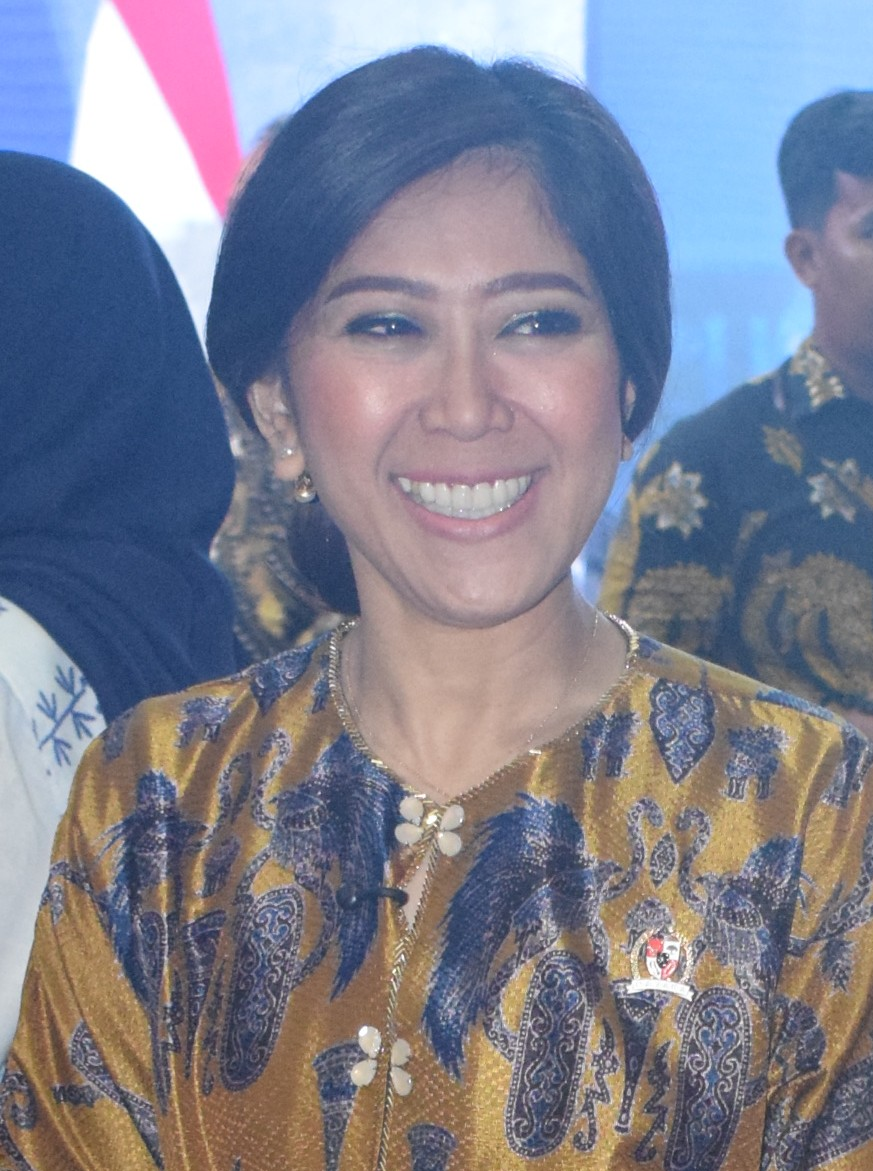

8th Minister of Communication and Digital Affairs of Indonesia
- Incumbent
- Assumed office 21 October 2024
- President: Prabowo Subianto
- Deputy: Angga Raka Prabowo; Nezar Patria
- Preceded by: Budi Arie Setiadi

Chair of the First Commission of the People's Representative Council
- In office 29 October 2019 – 1 October 2024
- Preceded by: Abdul Kharis Almasyhari

Vice Chair of the First Commission of the People's Representative Council
- In office 1 February 2016 – 4 April 2018
- Preceded by: Tantowi Yahya
- Succeeded by: Satya Widya Yudha

Vice Chair of the Committee for Inter-Parliamentary Cooperation of the People's Representative Council
- In office 20 October 2014 – 31 January 2016
- Preceded by: Tantowi Yahya
- Succeeded by: Tantowi Yahya

Personal details
- Born: Meutya Viada Hafid; May 3, 1978 (age 48) Bandung, Indonesia
- Party: Golkar
- Spouse: Noer Fajrieansyah
- Children: 1
- Parents: Anwar Hafid (father); Metty Rumaety (mother)
- Education: SMA Negeri 8 Jakarta; Crescent Girls' School
- Alma mater: University of New South Wales (BEng); University of Indonesia (MA)
- Awards: Elizabeth O'Neill Journalism Award (2007)

Meutya Viada Hafid (born 3 May 1978 in Bandung, West Java) is an Indonesian newscaster and politician. Since October 2019, she has been chair of the First Commission of the People's Representative Council, responsible for matters regarding national defense, foreign affairs, information, communications, and intelligence. She is now the 8th minister of communication and digital affairs of Indonesia. She is a member of the Golkar Party.

Before entering politics, Hafid was a journalist for Indonesian TV news channel Metro TV.

== Early life and education ==
She was born on 3 May 1978, in Bandung, Indonesia.

She attended SMP Negeri 1 Jakarta, a secondary school in Menteng, Indonesia, followed by SMA Negeri 8 Jakarta in Tebet, Indonesia. She then moved to Singapore, where she studied at Crescent Girls' School.

After completing her schooling, she pursued higher education in Australia and Indonesia. She earned a Bachelor of Engineering (BEng) in Manufacturing Engineering from the University of New South Wales, Australia, and later obtained a Master of Arts (M.A.) in Political Science from the University of Indonesia.

== Hostage tragedy ==
On 18 February 2005, Hafid and her cameraman, Budiyanto, were kidnapped and held hostage by gunmen while they were on reporting in Iraq. The last contact made with Hafid was on 15 February, three days earlier, by Metro TV. They were finally released on 21 February 2005. Prior to Iraq, Hafid had also covered the tsunami tragedy in Aceh.

On 28 September 2007, Hafid published her book 168 Jam dalam Sandera: Memoar Seorang Jurnalis yang Disandera di Irak (168 Hours Taken as A Hostage: Memoirs of a Journalist in Iraq). President Susilo Bambang Yudhoyono wrote the introduction in the book. Besides the president, several other figures also contributed to the book, such as Don Bosco Selamun (Chief Editor of Metro TV 2004–2005), Marty Natalegawa (Former Spokesman of the Ministry of Foreign Affairs), and Abu Bakar Baasyir (Leader of Jamaah Ansharut Tauhid).

== TV journalism career ==
On 11 October 2007, Hafid was selected as the winner of the Elizabeth O'Neill Journalism Award, rewarded by the government of Australia. The award is given annually to commemorate and honor former Australian Embassy Press Attache Elizabeth O'Neill, who died while working on a plane crash in Yogyakarta, on 7 March 2007. The award is given to one Australian journalist and one Indonesian journalist, assigned directly by the Australian ambassador for Indonesia, Bill Farmer. ABC Radio Australia journalist Joanna McCarthy was elected as the Australian winner. Along with this award, Hafid underwent a 3-week program in Australia's rural areas to find and develop a better understanding and appreciation for contemporary issues between Australia and Indonesia. Farmer said Hafid, who was a leading reporter for Metro TV news and talk shows like Top Nine News, Today's Dialogue and Metro Today, is the "most appropriate winner" as she is a hardworking, professional and dedicated journalist with good experience.

On 19 February 2008, Hafid was among the winners of the Australia Alumnus Award for the category of Journalism and Media, together with the owner of the Lippo Group Dr. Tjahaja James Riady (an alumnus of the University of Melbourne) who had also received the same award for the category of entrepreneurship. Hafid had studied at the University of New South Wales, before working as a Metro TV journalist. Other finalists in the same category were Avian Tumengkol (William Angliss Institute), a special vice presidential of foreign affairs, Wishnutama Kusubandio (Kooralbyn International School) a director of Trans 7, Mohammad Sobary (Monash University) an executive director of Kemitraan; and Rahmad Nasution (University of Queensland), Jakarta chief bureau of Reuters. Hafid is one of 30,000 Indonesian university students in Australia in the last 50 years, this is a testament to the good achievements and valuable contributions that have been made to bring Indonesian closer to the social environment of Australia, and vice versa. The awards were handed over to her, in front of approximately 700 Australian alumni and some Indonesian diplomats in Australia. Ex-minister Hartarto and leading businessman Noke Kiroyan were also in attendance.

On 9 February 2012, Hafid was among the five-top figures of The Most Aspiring Journalists in Indonesia, listed by Mizan Press, it is widely believed and considered that she is a major figure behind the development of Indonesian press. Hafid is the only woman who was listed in the Mizan Press's list, and as well is the youngest one. Hafid was chosen with Tirto Adhi Soerjo. Tirto Adhi Soerjo, was the pioneer of the first newspaper in Indonesia through the "Medan Prijaji" on 1 January 1907 in Bandung. Besides Soerjo, there is also the notorious writer and founder of Tempo magazine Goenawan Mohamad, the legendary Indonesian press figure Rosihan Anwar, and Andy F. Noya who hosts the famous show Kick Andy on Metro TV. "We are also getting more aware that it does not only take intellect and insight to be a journalist, but also courage and tenacity. And, last but not least, Hafid also make us realize that journalism is not exclusively a male profession" Mizan said.

== Political career ==
In 2010, Hafid was paired with H Dhani Setiawan Isma S.Sos as the candidate for Mayor and Deputy Mayor of Binjai for the period of 2010–2015, supported by the Golkar party, Demokrat party, Hanura, PAN, Patriot, P3I, PDS and 16 members of a non-party's faction of Binjai's parliament. The declaration of Meutya-Dhani candidacy, was strongly backed by the Golkar Party, for Mayor and Deputy Mayor held in the Patar Hall Building, Jalan Tengku Imam Bonjol, Binjai City, on 17 February 2010. The declaration ceremony was attended by thousands of supporters and required extra protection from the Binjai police. Unfortunately, Hafid had lost. At the time, there was an allegation of fraud that allegedly occurred during the vote recapitulation counting in the election offices of West Binjai, North Binjai, East Binjai, South Binjai, and Binjai City. There was also the strong notion that Dhani-Meutya's ballots were intentionally cut by 200, from 22,287 to 22,087. Besides that, many Dhani-Meutya votes were canceled because of too many ballots punched up symmetrically in the back of the voting paper that caused them to automatically be void, plus many ballots were also pinned in the middle that benefited a certain candidate. Hafid filed a lawsuit to the Constitutional Court about the issue, and asked for the ballot boxes to be recounted, as well as seeking the truth about the in Binjai City election, of where the fraud was allegedly to have happened in some of the polling stations in the District of West Binjai. These suspicions were based on the findings of many witnesses' own accounts that were at each the polling stations. Finally, the Court judged to reject the petition due to the 'insufficient evidence' that was supplied.

In August 2010, Hafid was appointed an interim Member of Parliament for the Golkar Party, replacing Burhanudin Napitupulu after he died.

On 25 July 2011, The NasDem Party political party was established. The founder of the then popular political organization, Surya Paloh, was known as a close friend of Hafid's (Paloh was Hafid's tutor while she worked at Metro TV). Hafid was among the Golkar cadres who left Nasdem. The Golkar Party General Secretary Idrus Marham said all members of the Golkar Party faction decided to withdraw from the Democratic National. The Democratic National party's resignation was announced on Thursday, 11 August 2011 which was the deadline for the Golkar cadres to choose between the banyan-symbolized-party and Nasdem. Other than Hafid, other notable Golkar cadres who had joined in Nasdem, and left afterwards, are Jeffrie Geovani and Ferry Mursyidan Baldan. On the very same day of the party's resignation, Hafid firmly stated on her Twitter account "it is not possible for me to become a member of another political party."
