= Attorney General Saleh =

Attorney General Saleh may refer to:

- Abdul Rahman Saleh (prosecutor) (born 1941), Attorney General of Indonesia
- Ismail Saleh (1926–2008), Attorney General of Indonesia
