= Abdul Rahman Saleh =

Abdul Rahman Saleh may refer to:

- Abdul Rahman Saleh (hero), a national hero of Indonesia
- Abdul Rahman Saleh (prosecutor), former prosecutor general of Indonesia
