= Bobby Adhityo Rizaldi =

Indonesian politician

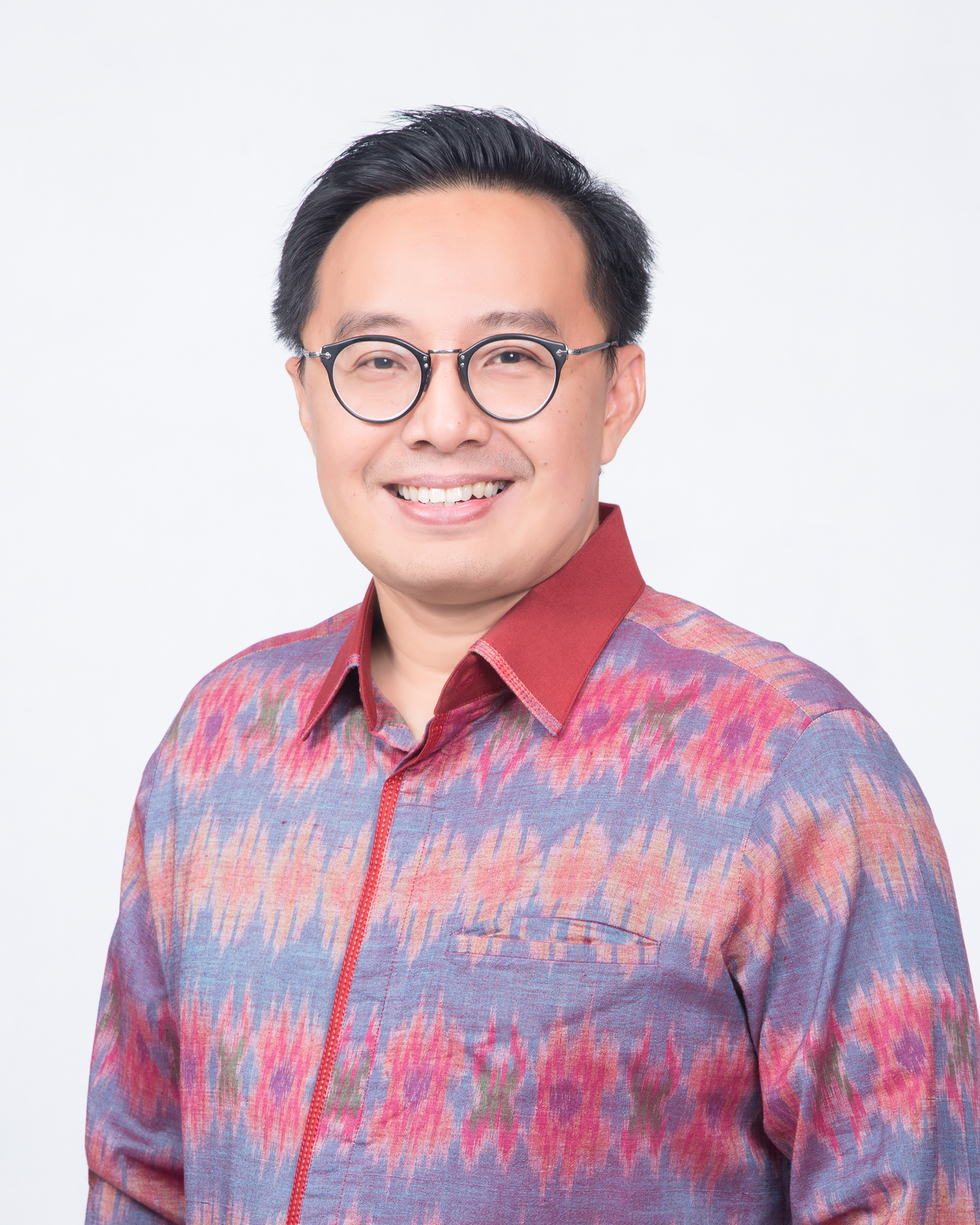

Member of the House of Representatives
- In office 1 October 2014 – 1 October 2024
- Constituency: South Sumatra II

Personal details
- Party: Golkar
- Education: Cleveland State University

Bobby Adhityo Rizaldi is an Indonesian politician and currently part of Commission I of People's Representative Council. He was elected as a member of the Indonesian Parliament for 2014–2019 and 2019–2024 from the electoral district South Sumatra II.

== Career ==
Rizaldi returned to Indonesia in 1999 after completing a master of Business Administration at Cleveland State University, and joined Deloitte Touche Tohmatsu, a public accounting firm in Jakarta. From 2004 to 2008, he worked for BP Migas, Indonesia' oil and gas regulatory agency, until he gained support to run for the People's Representative Council. Since 2009, he has been a member of the parliament.

Rizaldi stated that data-collection and government regulation is needed to prevent radicalization among the youth.
