= Semanggi shootings =

Shootings in Jakarta, Indonesia

- Part of the Post-Suharto era in Indonesia
- Date: 13 November 1998; 24 September 1999
- Location: Semanggi, Jakarta, Indonesia
- Caused by: Military resistance to demands for reform
- Methods: Shooting

Parties
Indonesian National Armed Forces Indonesian National Police	Indonesian students and civilians

Casualties
- Deaths: 17 killed in Semanggi I 12 killed in Semanggi II

The Semanggi shootings in Jakarta, Indonesia, were two incidents when state troops opened fire on unarmed civilians and protesters during special sessions of parliament. The first incident, known as Semanggi I, took place on 13 November 1998 and 17 people were killed. The second incident, Semanggi II, took place on 24 September 1999 and 12 people were killed and more than 200 wounded.

== Background ==
After long-serving President Suharto was forced to resign in May 1998 amid mass protests and deadly riots, student protesters continued to demand political reforms, particularly an end to the political role of the military and police. The first Semanggi killings took place when the Indonesian military and police were still a single entity, known as the Indonesian Armed Forces (ABRI), which had long been granted non-elected seats in the national parliament. The two entities in April 1999 split into the Indonesian National Armed Forces (TNI) and the Indonesian National Police, and the number of military/police appointees to parliament was reduced, but student protesters continued to demand a complete end to appointees from the state security forces.

== Semanggi I ==
In November 1998, a Special Session of Indonesia's People's Consultative Assembly (MPR) was convened to decide on a timetable for future national elections. University students protested against the session as they mistrusted Suharto's successor, President BJ Habibie, and members of the MPR. They also demanded an end to the military's non-elected representation in parliament.

On 13 November 1998, thousands of students held a sit-down protest near Atma Jaya University and the Semanggi cloverleaf interchange leading to the parliament building. Authorities responded by firing live ammunition. Seventeen people were killed and about 400 were wounded. The dead included six university students, two high school students and two Army officers. The dead were identified as: Teddy Wardhani Kusuma, Sigit Prasetyo (YAI), Heru Sudibyo (Universitas Terbuka), Engkus Kusnadi (Universitas Jakarta), Muzammil Joko (Universitas Indonesia), Uga Usmana, Abdullah/Donit, Agus Setiana, Budiono, Doni Effendi, Rinanto, Sidik, Kristian Nikijulong, Sidik, Hadi.

== Semanggi II ==
On 24 September 1999, students in Jakarta and several other cities were protesting a proposed law that would give the Army wider powers in emergency situations. One student and 11 others were killed, while more than 200 people were wounded. Yap Yun Hap (a student of the University of Indonesia) was shot dead outside Atma Jaya University. Other victims were killed in Lampung and Palembang, South Sumatra. In Lampung, Muhammad Yusuf Rizal and Saidatul Fitriah were killed. In Palembang, on 5 October 1999, Meyer Ardiansyah (Universitas IBA Palembang) was killed.

== Investigations, prosecutions and promises ==
Human rights activists called for investigations into senior military and police figures who held authority at the times of the killings: Wiranto (Minister of Defense), Roesmanhadi (Chief of National Police), Noegroho Djayusman (Chief of Jakarta Police) and Djaja Soeparman (Chief of Jakarta Military Command).

The government and military refused to bring the senior officers to trial for the Semanggi killings. This refusal prompted civil society groups to call on the House of Representatives (DPR) to set up an ad hoc tribunal. The DPR (legislators for the 1999–2004 period) in 2000 set up a Special Committee (Pansus) to examine whether the May 1998 Trisakti shootings and the two Semanggi incidents constituted gross violations of human rights. The Pansus included members of the military/police faction in parliament. When the Pansus announced its findings in July 2001, the party factions were divided. Only three factions—the Indonesian Democratic Party of Struggle (PDI-P), the Love for the Nation Democratic Party (PDKB) and the National Awakening Party (PKB)—stated the killings contained the elements of gross human rights violations. PDI-P and PDKB recommended human rights trials, whereas PKB suggested an out-of-court reconciliation. The other DPR factions—Golkar Party, the military/police, the United Development Party (PPP), the Crescent Star Party (PBB), the Reformasi Faction, the Indonesian Nationhood Unity Party (KKI) and the Daulat Ummah Party (PDU)—declared the killings were not gross human rights violations. The DPR therefore decided the killings should be dealt with by military tribunals, rather than an ad hoc human rights court.

In June 2001, military prosecutions commenced against 11 Mobile Brigade (Brimob) police personnel over the Semanggi I incident. In January 2002, nine of them were sentenced to three to six years in prison. In June 2003, another military court sentenced an Army Strategic Reserve Command (Kostrad) soldier, Buhari Sastro Tua Putty, for the shooting of Yun Hap at Semnanggi II. Although it was proven at the tribunal that the bullet that killed Yun Hap came from Buhari's gun, Djaja Suparman, who headed Kostrad when Semanggi II occurred, later wrote a book in which he suggested that an unknown party might have been using Buhari's gun. Military trials were also held for the shootings in Lampung and Palembang, with low-ranking police and military personnel being tried.

=== Komnas HAM investigation ===
The National Commission on Human Rights (Komnas HAM) established a Commission of Inquiry into Human Rights Violations in Trisakti and Semanggi (KPP-TSS). The military and police claimed that Komnas HAM's inquiry was illegitimate because the DPR had ruled that no gross violations of human rights occurred, and hence the officers ignored summonses for questioning, forcing Komnas HAM to subpoena witnesses under Article 95 of the Human Rights Law. The KPP-TTS found that gross violations of human rights had occurred.

In March 2002, Komnas HAM summoned Wiranto and Roesmanhadi for questioning over the shootings. Both Wiranto and Roesmanhadi refused to comply with multiple summonses, arguing the KPP-TSS investigation and the summonses were illegal.

Komnas HAM three times sent its case files to the Attorney General's Office to initiate prosecutions, but each time the files were deemed incomplete and sent back.

In 2007, some House factions tried to overturn the decision that the killings were not a gross violation of human rights, but the majority of parties rejected the proposal.

=== Yudhoyono and Jokowi ===
On 28 September 2010, President Susilo Bambang Yudhoyono promised to convey the matter to the Deputy Attorney General for Special Crimes, but the case did not progress. Yudhoyono's successor, President Joko 'Jokowi' Widodo promised three times to resolve cases of human rights violations: during his inauguration on 20 October 2014, in remarks on Human Rights Day on 2 December 2015, and at a cabinet meeting on 8 January 2016. Despite the promises of the presidents, relatives of the victims complain there has been no progress in handling the Semanggi killings.

Komnas HAM chairman Imdadun Rakhmat in 2016 acknowledged that progress on the case was sluggish, explaining the commission had to be cautious because of "very tough" political conditions. Jokowi's first Attorney General, Muhammad Prasetyo, denied the government lacked courage and seriousness to expose the facts behind the Semnanggi shootings; however, he said reconciliation would be a better option as taking the judicial route would only reopen old wounds and take time.

In January 2020, Jokowi's second Attorney General, ST Burhanuddin, reiterated the claim that the Semanggi shootings were not gross human rights violations. The Commission for Missing Persons and Victims of Violence (Kontras) questioned how the Attorney General's Office could make such a statement when it had never investigated the killings. "The party which has the right to declare whether or not it’s a gross human right violation is not the DPR because the DPR is a legislative body. We condemn the statement", said Kontras coordinator Yati Andriyani on 16 January 2020.

Under Law Number 26/200 on Human Rights Courts, the mechanism for declaring whether or not something is a gross human rights violation is: Komnas HAM investigates the incident, then the Attorney General's Office conducts a criminal investigation and prosecution, and a Human Rights Court tries the perpetrators. The DPR is not one of these parties.
