= Kasman Singodimedjo =

Indonesian politician (1904–1982)

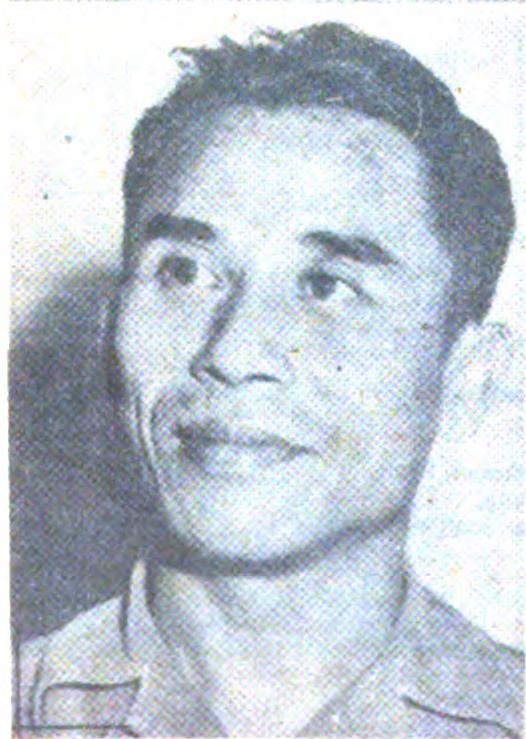
- Kasman, c. 1952

1st Chairman of the Central Indonesian National Committee
- In office 29 August 1945 – 16 October 1945
- Preceded by: Position created
- Succeeded by: Sutan Sjahrir

2nd Attorney General of Indonesia
- In office November 1945 – May 1946
- Preceded by: Gatot Taroenamihardja
- Succeeded by: Tirtawinata

Junior Minister for Justice
- In office 11 November 1947 – 23 January 1948
- Prime Minister: Amir Sjarifuddin

Personal details
- Born: 25 February 1904 Purworejo, Dutch East Indies
- Died: 25 October 1982 (aged 78) Jakarta, Indonesia
- Party: Masyumi

Kasman Singodimedjo (25 February 1904 – 25 October 1982) was an Indonesian nationalist, politician, and National Hero who served as the second Attorney General of Indonesia between November 1945 and May 1946, and as the first chairman of the Central Indonesian National Committee (KNIP) in 1945.

Born near Purworejo to a Muslim family, Kasman was educated in colonial schools before enrolling at the STOVIA medical school and the Batavia Law School. Graduating from the latter, he worked as a teacher before joining the Japanese PETA militia during the Japanese occupation period. He then participated in the Preparatory Committee for Indonesian Independence, lobbying other Muslim leaders to compromise in favor of national unity. After the proclamation of Indonesian independence in August 1945, he served as chairman of KNIP for two months before joining Masyumi and being appointed attorney general in November.

After the end of the revolution, Kasman became a legislator and participated in the Constitutional Assembly of Indonesia in the 1950s where he endorsed Islam as the basis of the Indonesian state. He was then arrested for supporting Masyumi leaders involved in the Revolutionary Government of the Republic of Indonesia and imprisoned, with another imprisonment in 1963 under charges of conspiracy against the state. After his release, he became a supporter of the Indonesian Muslims' Party and its successor the United Development Party. Shortly before his death in 1982, Kasman would take part in petitions criticizing Suharto's government. He was made a National Hero in 2018.

== Early life and career ==
Kasman was born near the town of Purworejo, today in Central Java, on 25 February 1904. (Note: Kasman's birth date is listed as 25 February 1908 in many official records. According to his parents, this was due to him entering school after his younger brother, and so he lied about his birth year to avoid embarrassment.) He was the third of seven children, although three of his siblings died in infancy. His father, Singodimedjo (d. 1930), was a local Islamic functionary. He was educated at a Hollandsch-Inlandsche School (Dutch school for natives), continuing to a Meer Uitgebreid Lager Onderwijs (MULO) middle school and then to the STOVIA medical school in Batavia. During his time at STOVIA's preparatory school, Kasman was elected chairman of the Jong Islamieten Bond, a Muslim youth organization founded in 1925, and he held this position between 1930 and 1935. Kasman had previously made connections at STOVIA to other Islamic organizations such as the Jamiat Kheir and Muhammadiyah, allowing JIB to become part of the growing Islamic political movement.

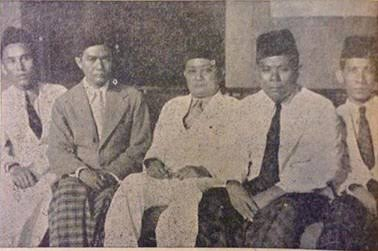
Kasman (leftmost) along with other leaders of the MIAI.

He did not complete his studies at STOVIA and instead enrolled at the Rechtshogeschool te Batavia (Batavia Law School/RHS), graduating with a law degree in 1934. He continued his education at the RHS until he obtained a doctorate in sociology and economics in 1939. Kasman began to teach at various schools, both those affiliated with the colonial government and with Muhammadiyah, after his graduation from RHS. He also became a leader in the Majelis Islam A'la Indonesia (MIAI) Islamic organization, a federation founded in 1937 of numerous Islamic organizations. He was imprisoned by Dutch authorities for four months after he gave a public speech in May 1940 calling for Indonesian independence, but was released after a defense led by lawyer and fellow nationalist politician Sartono. In 1941, he was working as an agricultural consultant for the colonial government.

Prior to the Japanese invasion and takeover of the Dutch East Indies, the Japanese military had made attempts to form good relations with Muslim leaders. Kasman attended the Islamic World Congress at Tokyo in 1939 as part of his leadership role in MIAI. After the takeover, Kasman was recruited into the occupational militia Pembela Tanah Air (PETA) and was appointed a battalion commander. During this period, Japanese authorities imposed severe restrictions on political activity. While the MIAI had been tolerated initially, its attempt to establish an independent network throughout Indonesia resulted in Japanese authorities legalizing Muhammadiyah and Nahdlatul Ulama, separating MIAI from its largest members. MIAI was disbanded by its chairman Wondoamiseno in 1943. At the time of the surrender of Japan, Kasman was the commander of PETA's Jakarta unit. Nationalist youths had been growing agitated following the spread of the news, intending to proclaim Indonesian independence. They had also made contacts with PETA units and commanders in Jakarta; however, Kasman was in Bandung at the time. Due to his absence, PETA in Jakarta did not take any action against or in aid of the youths.

== Political career ==
=== Revolution ===
Following the proclamation of Indonesian independence, Kasman along with several Indonesian collaborationist leaders were invited to informally join the Preparatory Committee for Indonesian Independence (PPKI) on 18 August, where Kasman and the others' positions were attacked by nationalist youths who considered them too close to the Japanese. On the same day, his lobbying of hardline Muslims such as Bagoes Hadikoesoemo allowed the revocation of a clause implementing sharia law to Muslims in the country. Although Kasman supported the clause, he believed that it was more crucial at that time to create national unity, and intended to implement the clause back into law at a later time upon the formation of a national parliament which was expected to convene in six months. The following day, the leaders formally requested the dissolution of PETA, although Kasman was appointed into a planning committee for an Indonesian national defence force.

After PPKI's dissolution, the Central Indonesian National Committee (KNIP) was formed on 29 August 1945 with Kasman as chairman. In the KNIP's second plenary session on 16–17 October, Kasman was criticized for inaction by representatives of nationalist youths. He was also accused of allowing soldiers under his command to be disarmed by Japanese troops while he commanded PETA in Jakarta. In contrast, according to fellow PETA officer Abdul Haris Nasution, Kasman had spoken to other PETA officers on 16 August and instructed them not to disarm. Kasman was removed from his chairmanship on 16 October, with Adam Malik temporarily taking his seat until Sutan Sjahrir was elected the following day. In November 1945, following the formation of the Masyumi political party, Kasman was appointed as a deputy chairman in its inaugural leadership.

Kasman was also briefly Attorney General of Indonesia, serving between November 1945 and May 1946. He was the second holder of the office after Gatot Taroenamihardja, and Kasman was in turn replaced by Tirtawinata. During his brief tenure, he issued an announcement to regional leaders, attorneys and police officers calling for the implementation of the "rule of law through quick and fair trials". He further established the organizational structures for regional prosecutors' offices in Java and Madura. Kasman also endorsed the call by Islamic guerilla leaders such as Kartosuwiryo for a jihad against the Dutch during his time in office. At one point during the revolution, he made a trip to Europe to study military tribunals there.

In the aftermath of a Dutch military offensive in 1947, Masyumi which had previously been part of the opposition agreed to join a unity government under prime minister Amir Sjarifuddin, and Kasman was appointed as junior minister for justice on 11 November 1947. This arrangement did not last long, as the cabinet was disbanded on 23 January the following year due to general opposition to the Renville Agreement. A second Dutch offensive in 1948 captured most of Indonesia's civilian government leaders including president and vice-president Sukarno and Hatta, but Kasman was not taken prisoner and he toured the Javanese countryside as a government spokesman, gathering support for the Indonesian cause.

=== Sukarno period ===
During the liberal democracy period in the 1950s, Kasman became a member of the Provisional People's Representative Council and the Constitutional Assembly of Indonesia. Within the Assembly, Kasman chaired an ad hoc preparatory committee which put forward recommendations on a new constitution and state philosophy, but beyond this, the Assembly made little progress. This deadlock was at large due to disagreements between a nationalist faction and an Islamist faction on the basis of the state. The secular nationalist faction held a majority in the Assembly, but Kasman refused to recognize majority decisions, claiming that Islam did not recognize majority rule. During Assembly debates, Kasman would quote and interpret the Quran, drawing his conclusion that Indonesia's Islamic community should be required to implement Islam as the basis of the state. Kasman justified his views by referring to the authority of Muslim organizations as shura (religious consensus). Prior Masyumi theorists had linked shura with democratic processes and ideals such as universal suffrage, while Kasman's interpretation limited it to a smaller group of Muslims – and excluded those which supported Pancasila.

Within party politics, Kasman remained a member of Masyumi's 15-strong executive committee upon its election in 1954. He also retained his parliamentary seat following the 1955 legislative election. During the Darul Islam rebellion, Kasman gave a speech in 1954 which was sympathetic to the movement and received a letter of thanks from an Islamic revolt leader. However, Masyumi officials rejected any associations with the rebellion. In 1958, with many Masyumi leaders being involved in the subversive Revolutionary Government of the Republic of Indonesia, Masyumi split over the question of denouncing said leaders. Kasman himself supported the rebelling leaders such as Mohammad Natsir.

Shortly after the rebellion's outbreak, Kasman gave a speech in Magelang which resulted in his arrest by authorities and imprisonment starting on 5 September 1958. Authorities claimed that his speech was in support of the rebels, although Kasman accused a journalist of misreporting his speech. He continued to be imprisoned without trial until 1960 when he was sentenced to three years' prison. During Kasman's imprisonment, Masyumi began to break apart while president Sukarno took over power from the parliament in 1959. Masyumi was dissolved by its chairman Prawoto Mangkusasmito on 13 September 1960. Kasman was again arrested on 9 November 1963 due to accusations of conspiracy against the state and of plotting to assassinate Sukarno. While the accusations failed to be proven in trial, on 14 August the following year Kasman was sentenced to another eight years in prison (reduced to two and a half years upon appeal).

=== Suharto period ===
During Suharto's presidency, Kasman remained a critic of the government. In the 1968 book Renungan dari Tahanan reminiscing of his time in prison, Kasman asserted his view of the superiority of Islamic principles over Pancasila. Kasman supported the foundation of the Indonesian Muslims' Party (Parmusi) in 1968, and was nominated for its first leadership election although he withdrew. Parmusi took part in the 1971 legislative election, and Kasman was part of the party's election committee which selected the party's nominees. He also campaigned for the party despite a dispute with some of the party's leadership. Parmusi won 24 seats in the election.

He then campaigned for Parmusi's successor party United Development Party, while not running as a candidate himself, in the 1977 Indonesian legislative election. In 1980, he signed two petitions – one (the Petition of Fifty) attacking the content of Suharto's speeches, and another criticizing the conduct of elections. Kasman was the first signatory of the latter petition, which was also known as the "Kasman Petition".

== Personal life and death ==
Kasman married Soepinah Isti Kasiyati on 17 September 1928, and the couple had six children. Kasman died on the evening of 25 October 1982 after receiving nine months of treatment for prostate cancer at the Jakarta Islamic Hospital. His body was buried at the Tanah Kusir Cemetery. In 1992, when the Suharto government distributed awards to former members of PPKI, Kasman was bypassed and did not receive an award. (Note: Author Lukman Hakiem speculated that this was due to Kasman's prior involvement in the petitions criticizing Suharto.) Later on, after the fall of Suharto, Kasman was declared a National Hero of Indonesia in 2018 by president Joko Widodo.
