= Soeprapto =

Soeprapto can refer to any of the following:

- Soeprapto (general) (1920-1965), an Indonesian general killed in the 30 September Movement
- Soeprapto (governor) (1924-2009), 11th Governor of Jakarta from 1982 to 1987, Vice Chairman People's Consultative Assembly
- Soeprapto (prosecutor) (1894-1964), 4th Prosecutor General of Indonesia
- Suprapto (governor Bengkulu) (1929-2003), 3rd Governor of Bengkulu from 1978 to 1989
