= Andhi Nirwanto =

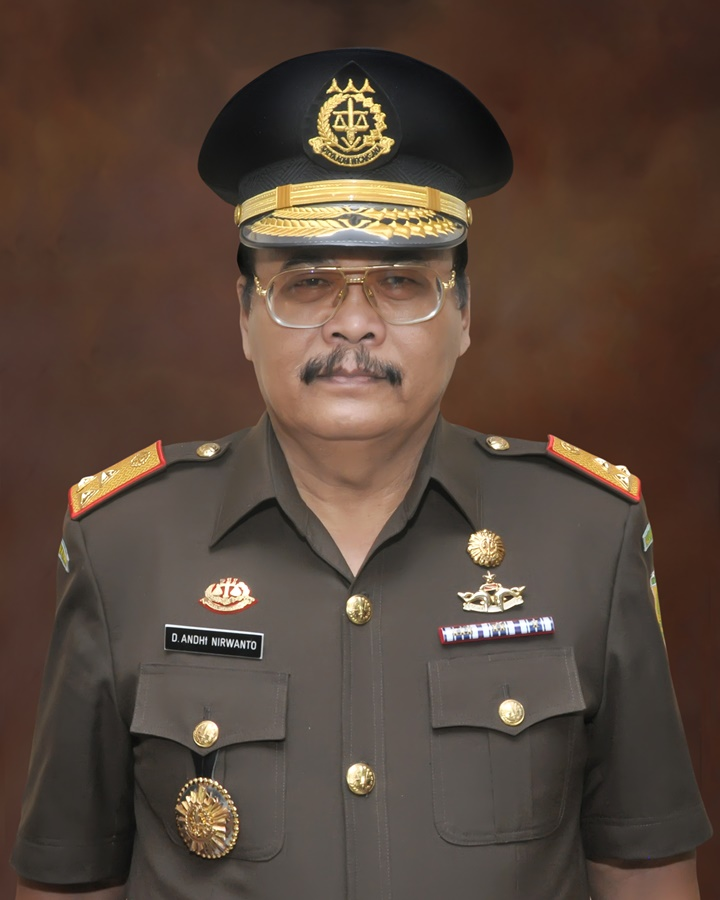

Wakil Jaksa Agung Republik Indonesia
- Incumbent
- Assumed office 21 November 2013
- President: Susilo Bambang Yudhoyono
- Preceded by: Darmono
- Succeeded by: masih menjabat

Personal details
- Born: 8 January 1956 (age 70) Kabupaten Kudus, Jawa Tengah

Andhi Nirwanto (born in Kudus, Central Java on 8 January 1956) is a former Attorney General of Indonesia from October 2014 to November 2014. Andhi was appointed Deputy Attorney General by President Susilo Bambang Yudhoyono on 19 November 2013 to replace the retiring Darmono.
