= Soeprapto (prosecutor) =

Indonesian judge and prosecutor (1894–1959)

Mr. Raden Soeprapto
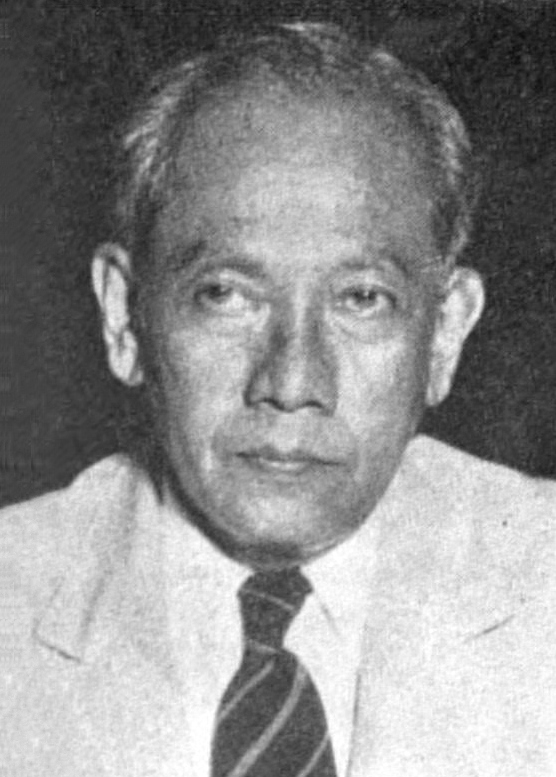
- Official portrait, c. 1954

4th Attorney General of Indonesia
- In office January 1951 – 1 April 1959
- President: Sukarno
- Preceded by: Tirtawinata
- Succeeded by: Goenawan

Personal details
- Born: 27 March 1894 Trenggalek, Dutch East Indies
- Died: 2 December 1964 (aged 70) Jakarta, Indonesia
- Resting place: Kalibata Heroes' Cemetery
- Occupation: Judge; prosecutor

Soeprapto (27 March 1894 – 2 December 1964) was the fourth Attorney General of Indonesia. Born in Trenggalek, East Java, Soeprapto studied law in Jakarta, finding work in the legal system soon after graduating in 1920. After transferring often, in the early 1940s he reached Pekalongan and became the head of the court for Native Indonesians. Escaping Pekalongan during Operation Product with the help of a prisoner he had just sentenced, Soeprapto made his way to Yogyakarta and began to work as a prosecutor. When the government moved to Jakarta in 1950, Soeprapto went with it. In January 1951, he was selected to be Prosecutor General of Indonesia, serving until 1 April 1959.

As prosecutor general, Soeprapto was noted for trying state ministers and generals despite them outranking him, a quality which Amir Hasan Ketaren of the Prosecutors' Commission finds lacking from subsequent officeholders. He was declared "Father of the Prosecutor's Office" on 22 July 1967, with a bust of him erected outside the Prosecutor General's Office.

== Early life and career ==
Soeprapto was born in Trenggalek, East Java, Dutch East Indies on 27 March 1894 to Hadiwiloyo, a tax collector, and his wife. He took his elementary studies at a Europesche Lagere School, then considered better than schools for Native Indonesians, eventually graduating in 1914. He then moved to Batavia (modern-day Jakarta), where he studied at Rechtschool with future state minister Wongsonegoro.

After graduating from the Rechtschool in 1920, Soeprapto went directly to work at the Landraad (court for Native Indonesians) in his hometown. For fifteen years he worked at Landraad in various locations, including in Surabaya, Semarang, Bandung, and Denpasar. He eventually rose to Head of the Landraad in Cirebon and Kuningan, serving from 1937 to 1941. From there, he transferred to the Landraad for Salatiga and Boyolali, then to Besuki, before settling as head of the Landraad in Pekalongan. While in Pekalongan, Soeprapto befriended a local prosecutor Soekarjo Kario Hatmodjo, father of Hoegeng.

Although Soeprapto was able to lead the court peacefully during the Japanese occupation, after the start of the Indonesian National Revolution the situation in Pekalongan became unstable. Although the nascent army was able to hold the peace during riots at the end of 1945, when the Dutch began a major assault on Java, Soeprapto was forced to flee south to Indonesian-held areas with his family. In this, Soeprapto was assisted by Kutil, a man whom he had only recently sentenced to death, and Kutil's other captive accomplices. Soeprapto's wife later remembered that Kutil and his men had "carried briefcases containing paperwork related to their cases ... and even [Soeprapto's] children, without showing any vengeance." (Note: Original: "... ikut membawakan kopor yang sebenarnya berisi berkas perkara dia sendiri ... Anak-anak sayapun ikut digendong dan tidak menunjukkan dendam pada Pak Prapto".) Although Kutil and his men escaped after evacuating, they were later recaptured, with Soeprapto serving as a witness against them.

After he escaped from Pekalongan, Soeprapto and his family first went to Cirebon. They then went to Yogyakarta, where Soeprapto became a judge at the high court. He later began work as a prosecutor, rising quickly through the ranks; several of his coworkers attributed it to the Kutil case, where Soeprapto demonstrated that he believed in the supremacy of law.

== Prosecutor general and later career ==
In 1950, Soeprapto returned to Jakarta and continued his work as a prosecutor. In January 1951, he was chosen to replace Tirtawinata as Prosecutor General of Indonesia. At the time, the prosecutor general's office was a division of the Ministry of Justice, and as such Soeprapto was under the Minister of Justice.

During his time as prosecutor general, Soeprapto handled several high-profile cases, going after ministers and generals who outranked him politically. In 1953, he brought Sultan Hamid II, then a minister without portfolio, to trial for his involvement in the APRA Coup d'état; Hamid was sentenced to 10 years in prison by Supreme Court Justice Wirjono Prodjodikoro on 8 April 1953. Soeprapto also investigated Head of the Armed Forces Abdul Haris Nasution for his involvement in the affair. Other cases included the trials of revolutionary groups and foreigners accused of undermining the Indonesian government. He also oversaw an increasing number of prosecutors, drawn from Indonesian law schools.

However, Soeprapto also came into conflict with Minister of Justice Moeljatno over the role of the prosecution. Moeljatno took the traditional view that the prosecutor general's office, under the control of the Ministry of Justice during the Dutch colonial period, was in a similar station after independence; on the other hand, Soeprapto believed that the function of the prosecutor general was half executive and half judicial and as such demanded to be accountable only to the cabinet. This conflict climaxed with Moeljatno drafting a bill to explicitly make the prosecutor general subservient to the Minister of Justice, which passed in October 1956 over heavy opposition from prosecutors and police officers. However, the bill fell through when the reigning cabinet collapsed in March 1957.

After eight years, Soeprapto was honourably dismissed on 1 April 1959. The dismissal has been reported in several sources to be related to the acquittal of/dropping of charges against two foreigners, Junschlager and Schmidt, who had been accused of undermining the government; Junschlager died in prison, and Schmidt was freed based on time served in a high court decision which the prosecution did not appeal. As he had not been given prior warning he was unable to go to Merdeka Palace for the related formalities; at the time he was visiting his parents in Yogyakarta. His wife later noted that this led to him becoming disillusioned with President Sukarno's regime.

Soeprapto married three times. He first married Soeratinah of Purworejo, with whom he had a son. He then married Djenab Oetari of Bogor, with whom he had a daughter. His last marriage was to Soekarti, with whom he had two sons and two daughters. He died on 2 December 1964 and was buried at Kalibata Heroes' Cemetery in Jakarta.

== Legacy ==
Soeprapto was posthumously declared the "Father of the Prosecutor's Office" on 22 July 1967 by Prosecutor General Soegiharto, which was formally recognized by Letter of Recommendation Number KEP-061/D.A/1967. That same year, a bust of him was placed in front of the prosecutor general's office in Jakarta. Several streets are named after Soeprapto, including in Gresik, Malang, and Surabaya.

Amir Hasan Ketaren of the Prosecutors' Commission stated in 2010 that Soeprapto was an example of what a prosecutor general should be: firm, knowledgeable, and unwilling to allow outside intervention in his investigations – even from the president. This quality, he said, was lacking in subsequent officeholders. The following year, Asvi Warman Adam of the Indonesian Institute of Sciences stated that there had yet to be another prosecutor general like Soeprapto, for – rather than investigating cases of corruption and keeping politics out of the position – subsequent holders of the office had often been corrupt themselves.

== Works cited ==
- Bahari, Adib (2011). Pendekar Hukum Indonesia [Indonesian Legal Giants] (in Indonesian). Yogyakarta: Pustaka Yustisis. ISBN 978-979-3411-04-0.
- "Daftar Riwayat Pendidikan & Pekerjaan" [Education and Employment] (in Indonesian). Jakarta: Daksa Studio. 2001. Archived from the original on 6 April 2012.
- "Dinas di Pekalongan" [Service in Pekalongan] (in Indonesian). Jakarta: Daksa Studio. 2001. Archived from the original on 6 April 2012.
- "Gresik" (Map). Google Maps.
- "Malang" (Map). Google Maps.
- "Surabaya" (Map). Google Maps.
- Lev, Daniel (2000). Legal Evolution and Political Authority in Indonesia : Selected Essays. The London-Leiden series on law, administration and development. Vol. 4. Hague: Kluwer Law International. ISBN 978-90-411-1421-1.
- Manafe, Imanuel Nicolas (29 November 2011). "Belum Ada Generasi Seperti Jaksa Agung Suprapto" [There's Yet to Be a Generation of Prosecutors like Suprapto]. Tribun (in Indonesian). Jakarta. Archived from the original on 5 March 2016.
- "Masa Sekolah & Dinas" [School Years and Service] (in Indonesian). Jakarta: Daksa Studio. 2001. Archived from the original on 6 April 2012.
- "Mengakhiri Masa Jabatan" [Ending His Service] (in Indonesian). Jakarta: Daksa Studio. 2001. Archived from the original on 6 April 2012.
- Nugroho, Irwan (21 September 2010). "Kalau Jaksa Agung dari Dalam, Harus Sekelas R Soeprapto" [If the Prosecutor General is from Within, He Must be the Same Class as R Soeprapto]. Detik News (in Indonesian). Jakarta.
- "Patung R. Soeprapto: Lambang Keberanian, Kecerdasan & Ketelitian" [Statue of R. Soeprapto: Symbol of Bravery, Cunning, & Methodicalness] (in Indonesian). Jakarta: Daksa Studio. 2001. Archived from the original on 6 April 2012.
- "Pengungsian di Jogyakarta" [Evacuation to Jogyakarta] (in Indonesian). Jakarta: Daksa Studio. 2001. Archived from the original on 6 April 2012.
- Santoso, Aris; Sutrisno, Ery; Sirait, Hasudungan; Hasibuan, Imran (2014). Hoegeng: Oase di Tengah Keringnya Penegakan Hukum di Indonesia. Yogyakarta: Bentang Pustaka. ISBN 9786027888005.
- "Sidang Para Menteri & Jenderal" [Trials of the Ministers and Generals] (in Indonesian). Jakarta: Daksa Studio. 2001. Archived from the original on 6 April 2012.
- "Zaman Parlementer" [The Parliamentary Period] (in Indonesian). Jakarta: Daksa Studio. 2001. Archived from the original on 6 April 2012.
