= Gustaaf Adolf Maengkom =

Former Indonesian Minister of Justice

Minister of Justice
- In office 9 April 1957 – 6 July 1959
- President: Sukarno
- Prime Minister: Djuanda Kartawidjaja
- Preceded by: Muljatno
- Succeeded by: Sahardjo

Personal details
- Born: 11 March 1907 Tondano, Minahasa, Dutch East Indies
- Died: 25 May 1984 (aged 77) Jakarta, Indonesia
- Spouse: Johanna Runtuwene
- Children: Ferdinand Alexander Eduard Maengkom, Jonas Maengkom (Children: Pierre Carl Gustav Maengkom, Jeanette Inger Johanna Kilgren, Maurice Gustav Adolf Maengkom; Grandchildren: Eric Schmidt, Isabelle Schmidt, Fredrik Kilgren, Gabriella Elisabeth Maengkom, Gloria Elleanor Maengkom, Galena Emmanuelle Maengkom), Henriette Marlise Louise Maengkom, Nanny Wilma Joyce Turangan-Maengkom (Children: Rene Turangan, Rafi Turangan), Gerdine Antoinette Kalonta-Maengkom

Gustaaf Adolf Maengkom (11 March 1907 – 25 May 1984) was a former Indonesian Minister of Justice in the Djuanda Cabinet and Indonesian ambassador to Poland.

== Life ==
Maengkom was born on 11 March 1907 at Tondano, Minahasa, then part of the Dutch East Indies.

Maengkom studied at the College of Law or Rechtshoogeschool te Batavia (RHS) in Batavia, but did not finish. After the Proclamation of Indonesian Independence, he became a member of the Tamtomo Battalion in the Siliwangi Division from 1947 to 1949. He subsequently served as a District Court judge in the cities of Denpasar in Bali, Sukabumi and Cianjur in West Java, and Jakarta.

From 1957 to 1959 Maengkom served as Minister of Justice in the Djuanda Cabinet led by Prime Minister Djuanda. Subsequently from 1962 to 1966, Maengkom served as Indonesian ambassador to Poland.

Aged 77, Maengkom died on 25 March 1984 at Jakarta.
