= Moeljatno =

Minister of Justice of Indonesia

Professor Doctor Meester Moeljatno
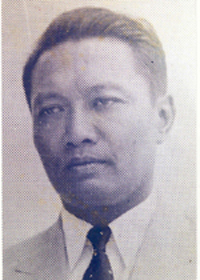

9th Minister of Justice of Indonesia
- In office 24 March 1956 – 9 January 1957
- Preceded by: Djodi Gondokusumo
- Succeeded by: Gustaaf A. Maengkom

Personal details
- Born: 10 May 1909 Surakarta, Dutch East Indies
- Died: 25 November 1971 (aged 62)
- Resting place: Gadjah Mada Cemetery, Yogyakarta
- Citizenship: Indonesian
- Party: Masyumi Party
- Spouse: Lamya Moeljatno
- Relations: Soekiman Wirjosandjojo (uncle)
- Education: Rechts Hoge School
- Profession: Prosecutor, professor of law

Moeljatno (EYD: Mulyatno; 10 May 1909 – 25 November 1971) was an Indonesian prosecutor and professor. He also served as Minister of Justice from 24 March 1956 to 9 January 1957.

== Biography ==
Moeljatno was born in Surakarta, Dutch East Indies on 10 May 1909. The eldest son of Wiryo Kartojo and his wife, he showed himself to be a hard worker and dedicated to his family. He finished his primary education at the Europese Lagere School in Boyolali, Central Java, graduating in 1918. He then returned to Surakarta, where he studied at a Middelbaar Uitgebreid Lager Ondewijs (middle school); he graduated in 1924. He graduated from the city's Algemene Middlebaar School in 1927. Aside from his formal education, Moeljatno also studied Islam under his uncle, Soekiman Wirjosandjojo.

After finishing his secondary education, Moejanto moved to Batavia to attend the Rechts Hoge School (law school) there. After graduating in 1936, he moved to Yogyakarta and took a job working for its sultanate. In 1939 he took a job at the High Islamic Court, serving until 1942. After the Japanese invaded the Indies, he moved to Jakarta to work at the prosecutor's office (Kensatukan Kooto Kensatu Kyoku).

After Indonesia's independence in 1945, Moeljatno began working as high prosecutor. In 1946 he joined Minister of Justice Soepomo and several other Ministry of Justice employees in formulating Law Number 1 of 1946, which applied the criminal code throughout the United States of Indonesia. In 1947, he was promoted to Deputy Chief Prosecutor under Tirtawinata. He was stationed in Yogyakarta, where he was invited to teach at the newly established faculty of law at Gadjah Mada University. When he quit his job as prosecutor in 1952, he dedicated himself exclusively to teaching.

On 24 March 1956, Moeljatno was selected to be Minister of Justice during the Second Ali Sastroamidjojo Cabinet; his selection was heavily influence by the Masyumi Party. However, he often came into conflict with Prosecutor General Soeprapto over their differing viewpoints on the role of the prosecutor general's office. At the time it was a branch of the Ministry of Justice, having inherited the arrangement from the Dutch colonial system; however, Soeprapto believed that the function of the prosecutor general was half executive and half judicial and as such demanded to be accountable only to the cabinet. As Moeljatno was held responsible for the actions of the prosecution, he pushed to keep the status quo by drafting legislation which explicitly made the prosecutor general subservient to the Minister of Justice. After it was passed by the cabinet in October 1956, Moeljatno received heavy opposition from the police and prosecutor's office. Moeljatno resigned as Minister of Justice on 9 January 1957, and when the cabinet fell in mid-March, the bill was dropped.

Moeljatno then returned to teaching, serving as dean of the faculty of law at Gadjah Mada University from 1957 to 1958; he later served twice more as dean of law.

Moeljatno died on 25 November 1971 and was buried in Gadjah Mada Cemetery in Yogyakarta. Professors Haryono of Gadjah Mada University and Prabuningrat, rector of the Islamic University of Indonesia, delivered eulogies at the funeral.

== Legacy ==
Moeljatno's outline of the fundamentals of Indonesian criminal law continues to be used by legal students and practitioners.

== Personal life ==
Moeljatno was married to Lamya Moeljatno, a fellow lecturer at Gadjah Mada University.
