= Public Prosecution Service of Indonesia =

Indonesian government agency

Public Prosecution Service Kejaksaan Republik Indonesia
- Logo of the Public Prosecution Service

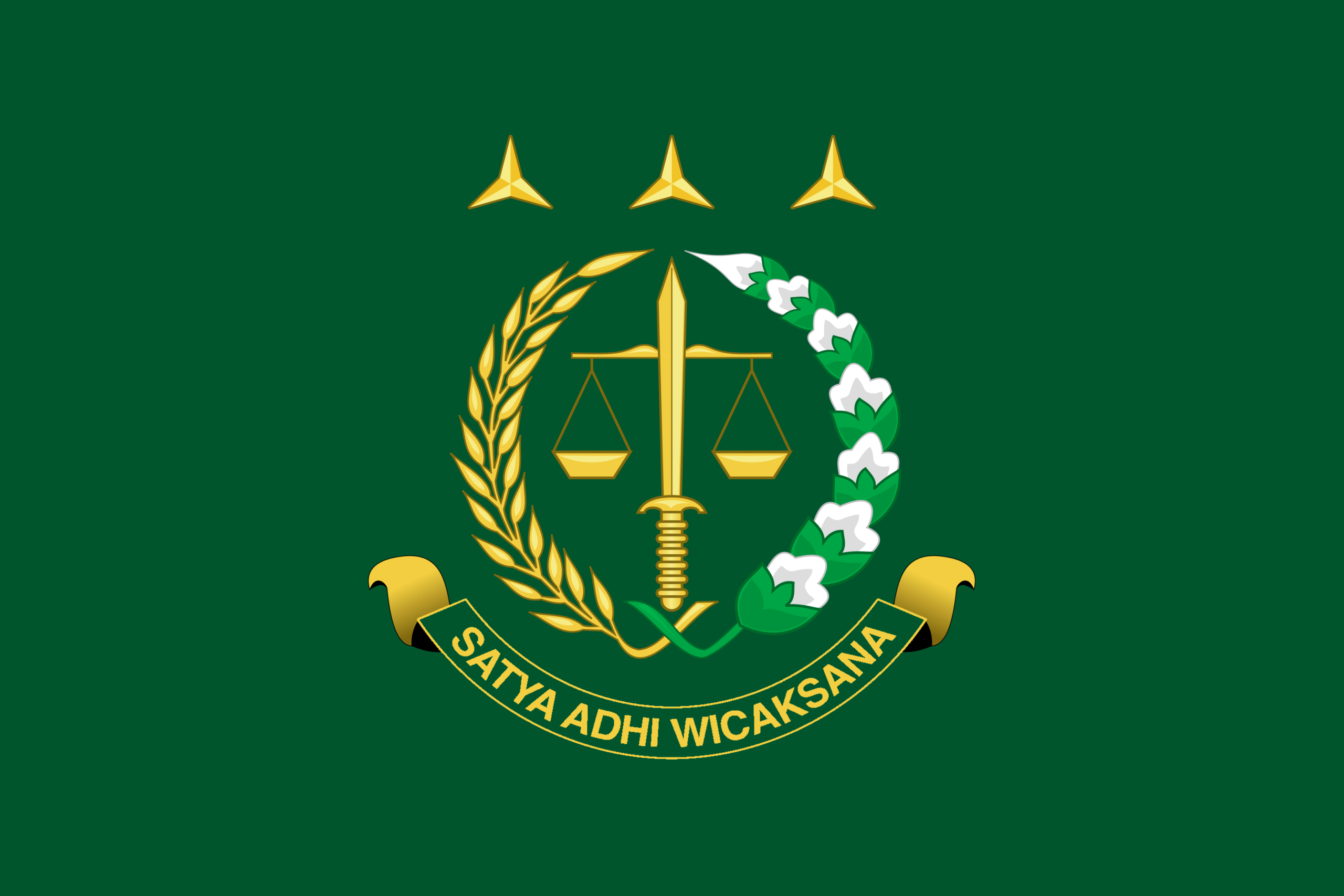
- Flag of the Public Prosecution Service
- Motto: Satya Adhi Wicaksana (Loyal, Excellent, Tactful)

Agency overview
- Formed: 19 August 1945 as a department under the Ministry of Justice

Jurisdictional structure
- National agency (Operations jurisdiction): Indonesia
- Operations jurisdiction: Indonesia
- Legal jurisdiction: Indonesia
- Constituting instrument: Law No. 16/2004 on Public Prosecutor Service

Operational structure
- Headquarters: Jl. Sultan Hasanudin No. 1 Kebayoran Baru, South Jakarta
- Prosecutors: 10,412 person (2016)
- Administrative personnels: 22,335 person (2016)
- Agency executive: Sanitiar Burhanuddin, Attorney-General

Website
- www.kejaksaan.go.id

The Public Prosecution Service of the Republic of Indonesia (Indonesian: Kejaksaan Republik Indonesia) is the government agency of Indonesia authorized for conducting public prosecution in Indonesia. It has other duties and authorities over certain matters as prescribed by laws.

== Structure ==
Public Prosecutors Offices Headquarters

The Service is structured on three levels of governance: National, Provincial and Municipal (although formally, it is only known as Central and Regional level).

- Office of the Attorney-General (Indonesian: Kejaksaan Agung Republik Indonesia), based in the national capital Jakarta, with nation-wide jurisdiction. It is headed by the Attorney-General (Jaksa Agung), a state official who was appointed by, and only answers to the President. The Attorney-General also headed the entire Indonesian Public Prosecution Service.
- Provincial Prosecutor's Office (Indonesian: Kejaksaan Tinggi), based in the provincial capital, with province-wide jurisdiction. It is headed by chief of high prosecution office (Kepala Kejaksaan Tinggi).
- District Prosecutor's Office (Indonesian: Kejaksaan Negeri), based in the municipalities (cities and regencies), with city- and regency-wide jurisdiction. It is headed by chief of district prosecution office (Kepala Kejaksaan Negeri).
- Branch Prosecutor's Office (Indonesian: Cabang Kejaksaan Negeri) are special prosecutor office formed by the Attorney-General's decision, subordinated to the District Prosecutor's Office. It is headed by chief of branch district prosecution office (Kepala Cabang Kejaksaan Negeri).

== Powers and duties ==
=== Main Powers ===
Under the 2004 Public Prosecution Service Act (Undang-Undang Nomor 16 Tahun 2004 tentang Kejaksaan Republik Indonesia) Article 30, the prosecutors of the Service are vested with law enforcement authority in:

1. Criminal cases, of which the prosecutors:
  1. conduct public prosecution activities;
  2. execute court orders and legally-binding court sentences;
  3. oversee the executions of probations, conditional sentences, and paroles;
  4. investigate certain criminal matters as prescribed by laws;
  5. prepare the required documents to proceed criminal cases to trial, and order further examinations investigations if needed.
2. Civil and State Administration cases, of which the prosecutors may be authorized to represent the state or the government, in the court or outside, for the duration of the proceedings.
3. Public Peace and Order, of which the prosecutors:
  1. promote public awareness of the law;
  2. promote policies of the law enforcement;
  3. secure circulations of print-based media;
  4. observe any beliefs that may endanger the public and the state;
  5. prevent religious misuse and/or blasphemy of the faiths;
  6. research and develop the crime statistics.

=== Others ===
- Article 31: Prosecutors are allowed to ask presiding judges to order convicts who are mentally compromised, physically unhealthy, or considered to be a danger to themselves, others, and the surroundings, to be held in hospitals, mental health facilities, or other facilities that may care for and secure them.
- Article 32: Prosecutors' powers may be expanded further and regulated as prescribed by laws.
- Article 33: Prosecutors are to cooperate with other law enforcement agencies and other government agencies.
- Article 34: Prosecutors may provide legal assistance toward other agencies.

=== 2021 amendment ===
Under the 2021 amendment of the Public Prosecution Service Act, new powers were added.

- Article 30A: Concerning cases involving asset recovery activity, prosecutors are authorized to track down, seize, and return said assets to the state, the victims, or rightful parties.
- Article 30B: Concerning intelligence activities of law enforcement, prosecutors are authorized to
  - investigate, secure, and gather intelligences;
  - establish an environment friendly to development efforts;
  - cooperate with other intelligence agencies, both domestic and overseas;
  - prevent activities of corruption, collusion, and nepotism; and
  - conduct multimedia supervision.
- Article 30C: The Public Prosecution Service is then tasked with additional duties, as follow.
  - create a crime activities statistics and a health service of the Public Prosecution Service;
  - be actively involved in truth seeking of human rights violation cases;
  - be actively involved in the victims and witnesses' affairs of a criminal case;
  - conduct criminal mediation, asset seizure for the payment of fines, substitute penalties, and restitutions;
  - provide investigative information regarding one's criminal records or criminal charges for the purpose of sitting in a public office;
  - conduct other civil and/or public functions as prescribed by law;
  - seize assets for the payment of fines and bails;
  - request a Judicial Review of a Court Decision; and
  - conduct wiretapping operation and serve as monitoring center.

== List of Public Prosecutor's Offices ==
Office of the Attorney General
No.	Prosecutor's Office	Office Seat	Address
1	Attorney General's Office of Indonesia	Jakarta	Jl. Sultan Hasanudin No. 1 Kebayoran Baru Jakarta Selatan 12160

Offices of the High Prosecutor
No.	Prosecutors' Offices	Jurisdiction	Office Seat
1	Provincial Prosecutor's Office of Aceh Kejaksaan Tinggi Aceh	Aceh	Banda Aceh
2	Provincial Prosecutor's Office of North Sumatra Kejaksaan Tinggi Sumatera Utara	North Sumatra	Medan
3	Provincial Prosecutor's Office of Riau Kejaksaan Tinggi Riau	Riau	Pekanbaru
4	Provincial Prosecutor's Office of West Sumatra Kejaksaan Tinggi Sumatera Barat	West Sumatra	Padang
5	Provincial Prosecutor's Office of Jambi Kejaksaan Tinggi Jambi	Jambi	Jambi City
6	Provincial Prosecutor's Office of South Sumatra Kejaksaan Tinggi Sumatera Selatan	South Sumatra	Palembang
7	Provincial Prosecutor's Office of Bengkulu Kejaksaan Tinggi Bengkulu	Bengkulu	Bengkulu City
8	Provincial Prosecutor's Office of Lampung Kejaksaan Tinggi Lampung	Lampung	Bandar Lampung
9	Provincial Prosecutor's Office of Bangka-Belitung Kejaksaan Tinggi Bangka-Belitung	Bangka Belitung Islands	Pangkal Pinang
10	Provincial Prosecutor's Office of Riau Islands Kejaksaan Tinggi Kepulauan Riau	Riau Islands	Tanjung Pinang
11	Provincial Prosecutor's Office of Banten Kejaksaan Tinggi Banten	Banten	Serang
12	Provincial Prosecutor's Office of Jakarta Kejaksaan Tinggi Daerah Khusus Ibukota Jakarta	Jakarta	South Jakarta
13	Provincial Prosecutor's Office of West Java Kejaksaan Tinggi Jawa Barat	West Java	Bandung
14	Provincial Prosecutor's Office of Central Java Kejaksaan Tinggi Jawa Tengah	Central Java	Semarang
15	Provincial Prosecutor's Office of Yogyakarta Kejaksaan Tinggi Daerah Istimewa Yogyakarta	Special Region of Yogyakarta	Yogyakarta City
16	Provincial Prosecutor's Office of East Java Kejaksaan Tinggi Jawa Timur	East Java	Surabaya
17	Provincial Prosecutor's Office of Bali Kejaksaan Tinggi Bali	Bali	Denpasar
18	Provincial Prosecutor's Office of West Nusa Tenggara Kejaksaan Tinggi Nusa Tenggara Barat	West Nusa Tenggara	Mataram
19	Provincial Prosecutor's Office of East Nusa Tenggara Kejaksaan Tinggi Nusa Tenggara Timur	East Nusa Tenggara	Kupang
20	Provincial Prosecutor's Office of West Kalimantan Kejaksaan Tinggi Kalimantan Barat	West Kalimantan	Pontianak
21	Provincial Prosecutor's Office of Central Kalimantan Kejaksaan Tinggi Kalimantan Tengah	Central Kalimantan	Palangkaraya
22	Provincial Prosecutor's Office of South Kalimantan Kejaksaan Tinggi Kalimantan Selatan	South Kalimantan	Banjarmasin
23	Provincial Prosecutor's Office of East Kalimantan Kejaksaan Tinggi Kalimantan Timur	East Kalimantan and North Kalimantan	Samarinda
24	Provincial Prosecutor's Office of North Sulawesi Kejaksaan Tinggi Sulawesi Utara	North Sulawesi	Manado
25	Provincial Prosecutor's Office of Gorontalo Kejaksaan Tinggi Gorontalo	Gorontalo	Gorontalo City
26	Provincial Prosecutor's Office of Central Sulawesi Kejaksaan Tinggi Sulawesi Tengah	Central Sulawesi	Palu
27	Provincial Prosecutor's Office of West Sulawesi Kejaksaan Tinggi Sulawesi Barat	West Sulawesi	Mamuju
28	Provincial Prosecutor's Office of South Sulawesi Kejaksaan Tinggi Sulawesi Selatan	South Sulawesi	Makassar
29	Provincial Prosecutor's Office of Southeast Sulawesi Kejaksaan Tinggi Sulawesi Tenggara	Southeast Sulawesi	Kendari
30	Provincial Prosecutor's Office of North Maluku Kejaksaan Tinggi Maluku Utara	North Maluku	Ternate
31	Provincial Prosecutor's Office of Maluku Kejaksaan Tinggi Maluku	Maluku	Ambon
32	Provincial Prosecutor's Office of West Papua Kejaksaan Tinggi Papua Barat	West Papua	Manokwari
33	Provincial Prosecutor's Office of Papua Kejaksaan Tinggi Papua	Papua	Jayapura

== See also ==
- Adhyaksa Bekasi, a professional football team underneath the stewardship of the Public Prosecution Service of Indonesia and competes in Championship
- Law enforcement in Indonesia
