= Bambang Kristiono =

Indonesian politician (1960–2023)

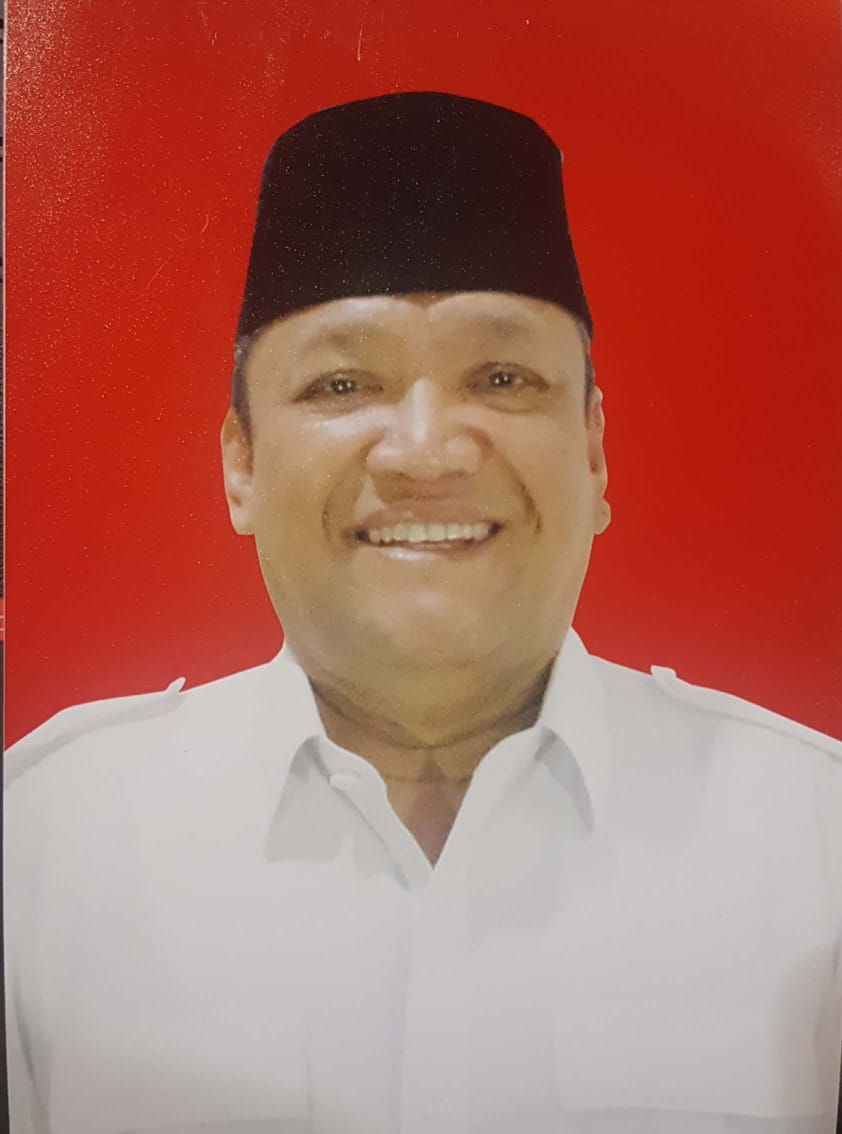

Member of the People's Representative Council
- In office 1 October 2019 – 20 July 2023
- Constituency: West Nusa Tenggara II

Personal details
- Born: 25 December 1960 Purwakarta, West Java, Indonesia
- Died: 20 July 2023 (aged 62) Makassar, South Sulawesi, Indonesia
- Party: Gerindra
- Spouse: Ine Diniarti
- Children: Dilly Adri Kristiono, Felicia Dilla Kristiono
- Education: Indonesian Military Academy; Indonesia Institute of Economics
- Website: Web Bambang Kristiono

Military service
- Branch/service: Indonesian Army
- Years of service: 1985–1999
- Rank: Major
- Unit: Infantry

Bambang Kristiono (25 December 1960 – 20 July 2023) was an Indonesian military officer and politician of the Gerindra Party who served as a member of the People's Representative Council from 2019 until his death in 2023. He previously served in Kopassus, Indonesia's special forces, and was arrested during the early years of the post-Suharto era for his involvement in kidnapping political activists.

== Early life and education ==
Bambang was born on 25 December 1960 in Purwakarta, West Java. Bambang completed his primary education at a state school in Cibening in 1973, junior high school in Campaka in 1976, and high school in Cikampek in 1980. He then joined the Indonesian Army in 1985 after being trained at the Indonesian Military Academy from 1981 until 1985.

== Military career and arrest ==
After joining the Indonesian Army, Bambang was assigned to Kopassus, Indonesia's special forces. His career in Kopassus slowly rose due to the patronage of Prabowo Subianto, Suharto's son-in-law. Upon Prabowo's appointment as the commanding general of Kopassus, Bambang was assigned to Group 4 of Kopassus and became Prabowo's secretary. He was later appointed the commander of 42nd Kopassus Battalion.

He was tasked by Prabowo in 1997 to form the Pigeon Task Force, a secret task force inside Kopassus. Bambang, who was a major at that time, instructed three of the officers in the task force to analyze information and form three separate teams inside the task force. The three teams had different tasks: the Rose Team was tasked to "detect radical groups, rioters, and terrorists", the Junior Guard Team was tasked to rally students, and the support team was tasked to assist military operations.

The Rose Team was commanded by Bambang himself and consisted of several Kopassus officers (these officers would later hold important military offices after Prabowo Subianto became defense minister) and subalterns. The funds for the Rose Team came from Kopassus's budgets and savings from the 42nd Battalion bank account. The Rose Team later kidnapped several activists in protests that occurred during the course of the fall of Suharto. Among those kidnapped by the Rose Team was Desmond Junaidi Mahesa, who later served as a member of the People's Representative Council for the Gerindra Party alongside Bambang in 2019.

In the aftermath of the kidnappings, both Prabowo and Bambang were tried by the court. The trials resulted in different conclusions. The military court which tried Prabowo, concluded that the kidnappings were done under the command of Prabowo Subianto and Chairawan K. Nusyirwan (Bambang's immediate superior in Kopassus). Several months after Prabowo's trial, Bambang was tried and testified that he did the kidnappings under his own initiative. Chairman of Indonesia's human rights commission, Marzuki Darusman, described Bambang's trial as odd as it did not explain the chain of command in Kopassus. Nevertheless, Bambang was fired from the military in February 1999 and was sentenced to 22 months in prison.

== Business and political career ==
After being released from prison, Bambang was sent to the Indonesia Institute of Economics and received a bachelor's degree in economics. He was then appointed by Prabowo Subianto to supervise his companies as commissioner. Bambang became a core member of Prabowo's campaign team during the 2009 Indonesian presidential election. Bambang would later join Gerindra, Prabowo's party, and became a member of the party's executive council and the chairman of the supervisory council.

Bambang was nominated by Prabowo for a seat in the People's Representative Council during the 2019 Indonesian general election. He was nominated from the West Nusa Tenggara II electoral district, and competed against several notable names from the region, such as former minister Helmy Faishal Zaini. Bambang won a seat in the election with 97,110 votes, the highest number of votes obtained by a single candidate in the electoral district.

Bambang was assigned to Commission I, which has the scope of tasks in the fields of defense, foreign affairs, communications and informatics, and intelligence. He became the commission's vice chairman.

In 2021, Bambang established the Haji Bambang Kristiono Foundation and became its trustee.

== Personal life and death ==
Bambang was married to Ine Diniarti and had two children.

Bambang died of a heart attack in Makassar, on 20 July 2023, at age 62. His body was taken to his residence in Jakarta. Bambang was buried at the San Diego Hills Memorial Park in Karawang, West Java on the same day.
