= Hendarman Supandji =

Indonesian lawyer and politician

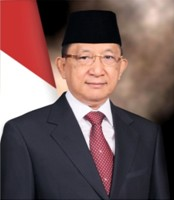

Attorney General of Indonesia
- In office 7 May 2007 – 23 September 2010
- President: Susilo Bambang Yudhoyono
- Preceded by: Abdul Rahman Saleh
- Succeeded by: Darmono

Personal details
- Born: 6 January 1947 (age 79) Klaten, Central Java, Indonesia

Hendarman Supandji (born 6 January 1947) is an Indonesian lawyer and politician from Klaten, Central Java, and a former Attorney General of Indonesia.

He graduated from the law faculty of Diponegoro University in 1972. He is currently part of the United Indonesia Cabinet and served as attorney general of Indonesia between 7 May 2007 and 23 September 2010. He succeeded Abdul Rahman Saleh.

Hendarman's tenure as attorney general ended after the Indonesian Supreme Court upheld a review which stated that he should have been re-inaugurated at the start of President Susilo Bambang Yudhoyono's second term of office in 2009. The position was then occupied by acting Attorney General Darmono.
