= Darmono =

Indonesian prosecutor (1953–2025)

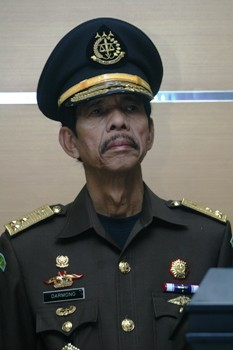
- Darmono

Attorney General of Indonesia (Acting)
- In office 24 September 2010 – 26 November 2010
- President: Susilo Bambang Yudhoyono
- Preceded by: Hendarman Supandji
- Succeeded by: Basrief Arief

Personal details
- Born: 5 June 1953 Klaten, Indonesia
- Died: 6 October 2025 (aged 72) Jakarta, Indonesia

Darmono (5 June 1953 – 6 October 2025) was an Indonesian prosecutor who served as acting Attorney General.

Before retirement, Darmono was deputy attorney general, a position he occupied since 23 December 2009 after the resignation of Abdul Hakim Ritonga. Darmono was appointed acting attorney general on 24 September 2010 by Indonesian President Susilo Bambang Yudhoyono in order to replace Hendarman Supandji who had been honorably discharged with the Presidential Decree No. 104 of 2010.

Darmono died on 6 October 2025, at the age of 72.
