= Gatot Taroenamihardja =

Indonesian attorney general

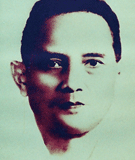
Gatot Taroenamihardja

Mr. Gatot Taroenamihardja (24 November 1901 – 24 December 1971) was Indonesia's first attorney general.

== Biography ==
Taroenamihardja became Indonesia's first attorney general after Indonesia's independence in 1945. President Sukarno established him as the attorney general on 19 August 1945, two days after independence. Before his resignation on 24 October of the same year, Taroenamihardja released one declaration and one announcement, both on 1 October. The declaration, pronounced together with Minister of Justice Soepomo and Minister of Home Affairs Wiranata Koesoema, outlined the function of the attorney general's office, while the instruction, directed at the Indonesian National Police, ordered them to take extra measures to ensure the safety of the republic from Dutch troops during the Indonesian National Revolution.

He became attorney general again on 1 April 1959, during a period of turmoil; the government was facing an uprising from Darul Islam, as well as struggling with the integration of Dutch New Guinea. Taroenamihardja was attorney general for a period of four months and 21 days, resigning on 22 September 1959; he was replaced by Goenawan. He later joined the Ministry of Justice.
