= Anton Sukartono Suratto =

Indonesian politician (born 1974)

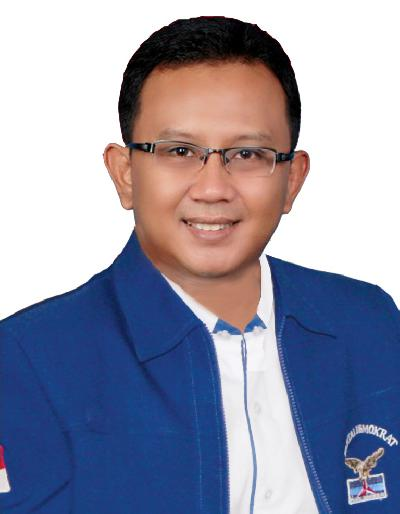
- Anton Sukartono Suratto in 2019

Member of the House of Representatives
- Incumbent
- Assumed office 1 October 2009
- Constituency: West Java V

Personal details
- Born: 15 March 1974 (age 52)
- Party: Democratic Party

Anton Sukartono Suratto (born 15 March 1974) is an Indonesian politician serving as a member of the House of Representatives since 2009. He has served as chairman of the Democratic Party in West Java since 2022.
