= Helmy Faishal Zaini =

Indonesian politician (born 1972)

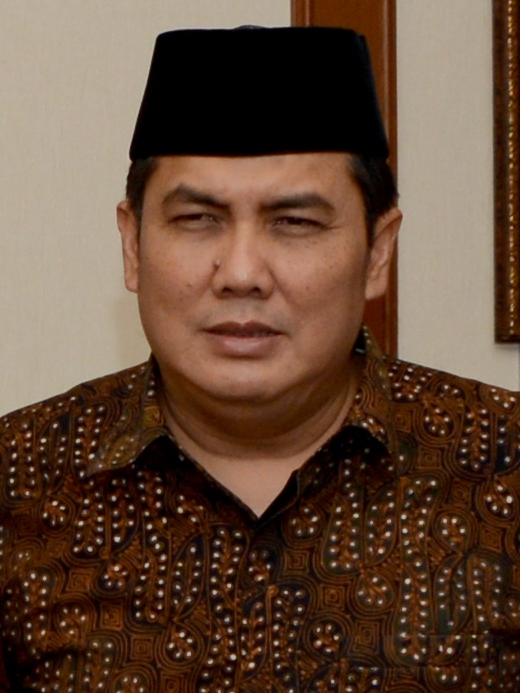
Zaini in 2017

Helmy Faishal Zaini (born 1 August 1972 in Cirebon, West Java) is an Indonesian politician. He is the former Minister of Development in the Second United Indonesia Cabinet. He resigned as Minister after being elected to the House of Representatives in 2014.

In addition, he was a member of the House of Representatives in the period 2004–2009 from the National Awakening Party.
