= Goenawan =

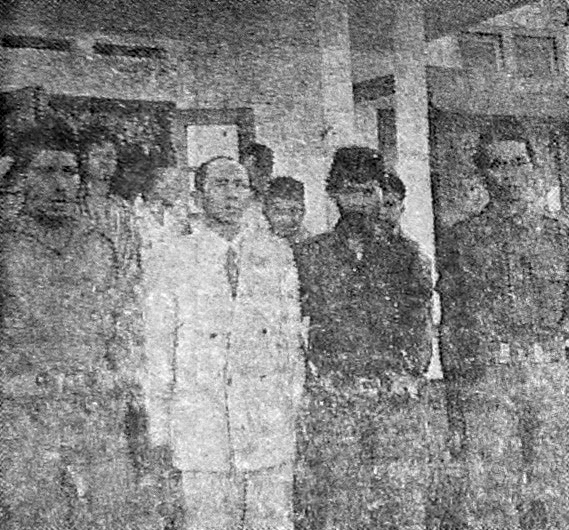
Goenawan, in the white suit

Raden Goenawan was Attorney General of Indonesia from 31 December 1959 to 1962.

== Biography ==
Goenawan worked as Deputy Prosecutor General under Gatot Taroenamihardja. On 31 December 1959, Goenawan replaced him.

As prosecutor general, Goenawan oversaw the formation of the Bureau of Oversight for Faiths and Denominations (Biro Pengawasan Aliran Kepercayaan) and the expansion of the prosecutor's office into preventative, governmental, and security matters. He also oversaw greater codification of the prosecutor's duties, with Presidential Decision Number 204 / 1966 passing on 22 July 1960, and Law number 15 of 1961 about the Fundamentals of Prosecution passing on 30 June 1961. As part of this codification, he helped to design the logo used by the prosecutor's office and choose their uniforms.

Goenawan was removed from office in 1962 for "blatant maladministration of justice".
