= Elizabeth O'Neill (official) =

Australian diplomat (1969–2007)

Liz O'Neill OAM
- Born: Elizabeth Josephine O'Neill; 19 March 1969; Brisbane
- Died: 7 March 2007 (aged 37); Adisutjipto International Airport, Yogyakarta, Indonesia
- Education: University of Sydney (BA)
- Occupations: Diplomat, public servant
- Spouse: Wayne Adams (m. 2003–2007)
- Children: Lucinda

Elizabeth Josephine "Liz" O'Neill OAM (19 March 1969 – 7 March 2007) was an Australian public servant and diplomat.

She was Counsellor (Public Affairs) for the Public Affairs section of the Australian Embassy in Jakarta at the time of her death. in service of the Department of Foreign Affairs and Trade. She was killed on 7 March 2007 in the crash of Garuda Indonesia Flight 200 in Yogyakarta, Indonesia. The Elizabeth O'Neill Journalism Award is given annually in her honour.

== Honours ==
O'Neill was awarded a Medal of the Order of Australia in October 2003 for her service as a member of the Department of Foreign Affairs and Trade, Bali crisis taskforce through liaison with the media following the bombings which occurred in Bali on 12 October 2002.
