= Attorney General's Office of Indonesia =

Indonesian government authority

Attorney General of the Republic of Indonesia
- Jaksa Agung Republik Indonesia

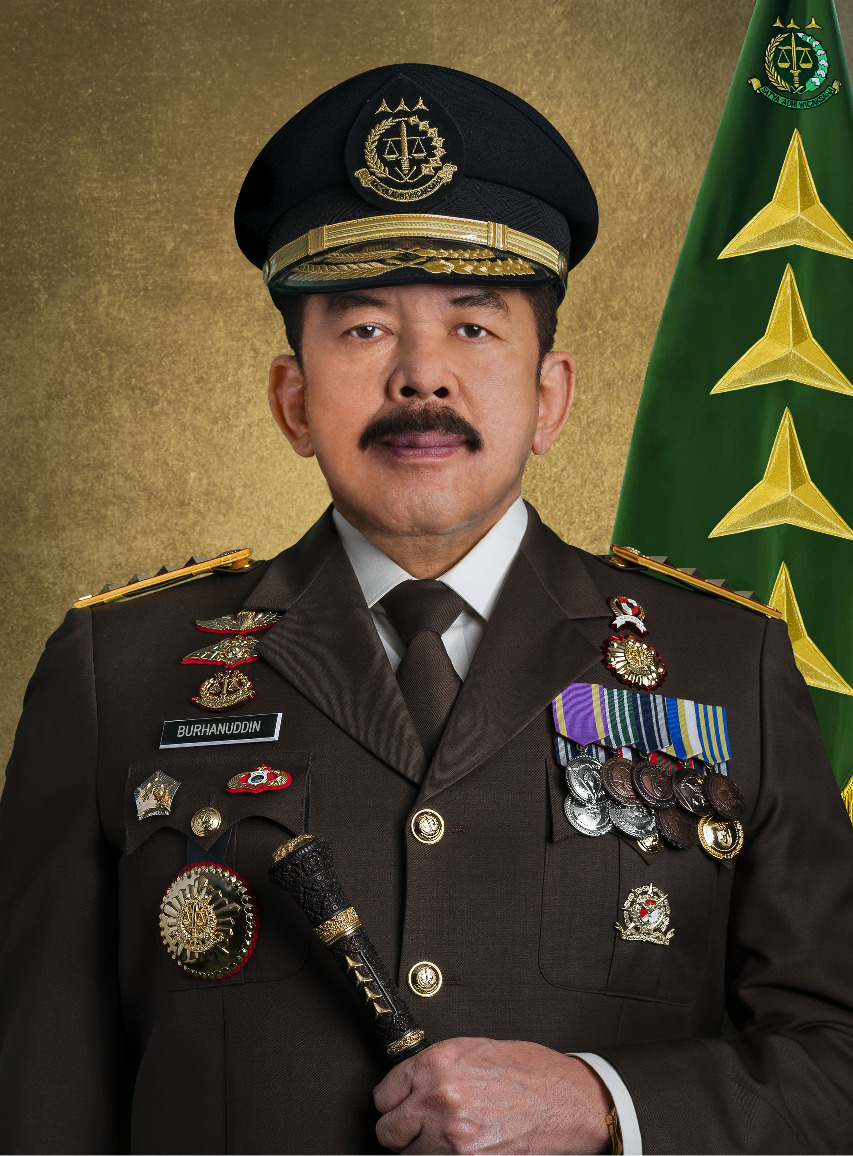
- Incumbent; Sanitiar Burhanuddin since 23 October 2019
- Cabinet-level official
- Seat: Jakarta
- Appointer: President of Indonesia
- Term length: ran concurrently with the President who appointed them to the office
- Formation: 19 August 1945; 81 years ago as a department within the Ministry of Justice; 22 July 1960; 66 years ago as a standalone institution
- First holder: Gatot Taroenamihardja
- Website: www.kejaksaan.go.id

The Attorney General's Office of the Republic of Indonesia (Indonesian: Kejaksaan Agung Republik Indonesia, abbreviated as Kejagung) is the competent authority to advise the Government of Indonesia on matters of law. It serves as the central organization for the Indonesian Public Prosecution Service (Kejaksaan Republik Indonesia). The Attorney General's Office is seated in the national capital Jakarta.

The Office is headed by the Attorney General of Indonesia, who has the authority to represent the government at the Supreme Court of Indonesia and is a Cabinet-level official. The Office is not part of any justice portfolio or the Judiciary, however, as the cabinet has its own Ministry of Law (Kementerian Hukum) with a separate Minister of Law (Menteri Hukum) that focuses on more technical matters and regulatory role making rather than executing the Supreme Court's order.

The Attorney-General also functions as a Solicitor General. Thus, the Attorney-General can represent the Government in the Supreme Court. The Attorney-General has the power to indict and prosecute alleged criminals. The term of office of the Attorney General was determined by the Constitutional Court of Indonesia in 2010 to be concurrent with the term of office of the President of Indonesia. The current Attorney General of Indonesia Sanitiar Burhanuddin, assumed office in October 2019.

== Organization ==
The Attorney-General's Office headed the entire Indonesian Public Prosecution Service, with a nation-wide jurisdiction. Subordinated directly under it is the Office of the High Prosecutors, based in the provincial capital, with province-wide jurisdiction.

In accordance with Attorney General Decree No 3./2024, Indonesian Public Prosecution Service consisted of:

=== Leadership elements ===
- Attorney General (Jaksa Agung), heads the Indonesian Public Prosecution Service, guides the Service's duties and authorities.
- Vice Attorney General (Wakil Jaksa Agung), assists the Attorney General, represents the Attorney General in their absence, and executes other duties tasked by the Attorney General.
- Assistant to the Attorney General (Asisten Jaksa Agung), maximum 2 assistants, they assist the Attorney General in specified field.

=== Leadership support elements ===
- Advisors to the Attorney General (Staf Ahli), who advise the Attorney General over matters of expertise.
- Deputy Attorney General on Advancement (Jaksa Agung Muda Bidang Pembinaan), oversees planning, procurement and construction, organization management, human resources, finances, state assets management, legal opinions, legal drafting, international cooperation, public service, and other technical supports. The office is assisted by several subordinate units:
  - Guidance Affairs Secretariat (Sekretariat Jaksa Agung Muda Bidang Pembinaan);
  - Bureau of Planning (Biro Perencanaan);
  - Bureau of General Affairs (Biro Umum);
  - Bureau of Human Resources (Biro Kepegawaian);
  - Bureau of Finance (Biro Keuangan);
  - Bureau of Facilities (Biro Perlengkapan); and
  - Legal and Foreign Cooperation Bureau (Biro Hukum dan Hubungan Luar Negeri).
- Deputy Attorney General on Intelligence (Jaksa Agung Muda Bidang Intelijen), oversees intelligence of investigations, security, promotion to prevent and repress crime, travel bans, and public peace and order. The office is assisted by several subordinate units:
  - Intelligence Affairs Secretariat (Sekretariat Jaksa Agung Muda Bidang Intelijen);
  - 1st Intelligence Directorate (Direktorat I), tasked for (i) providing intelligence and performing intelligence operations on Ideological, Political, Defense, and Security Affairs, (ii) ideological security, unity, national integrity, (iii) terrorism and separatist ideological monitoring, (iv) monitoring governance, political parties, national and regional election, (v) radical, terrorism, and separatist movements monitoring, (vi) cybercrime monitoring, (vii) territorial integrity, (viii) crime immigration preventive operations, (ix) foreigners monitoring, (x) human resource security, and (xi) case security;
  - 2nd Intelligence Directorate (Direktorat II), tasked for (i) providing intelligence and performing intelligence operations on Social, Cultural, and Societal Affairs, (ii) distribution of printings, communication media, and multimedia, (iii) religious beliefs and local beliefs monitoring, (iv) prevention of cults, heretical, and other blasphemous teachings, (v) cultural and societal observations, and (vi) general public order maintenance and public legal awareness;
  - 3rd Intelligence Directorate (Direktorat III), tasked for (i) providing intelligence and performing intelligence operations on Economic and Financial Affairs, (ii) monitoring of state finance and wealth, (iii) monitoring of state revenue and investment, (iv) monitoring of trade, industry, and manpower, (v) monitoring of natural resource utilization, agrarian and spatial affairs;
  - 4th Intelligence Directorate (Direktorat IV), tasked for (i) providing intelligence and performing intelligence operations on Strategic Development Security Affairs, (ii) monitoring of developmental security of transportation and telecommunication infrastructures, (iii) monitoring of developmental security of irrigation, agriculture, and maritime infrastructures, (iv) monitoring of developmental security of energy, natural resources, science and technological infrastructures, (v) monitoring of developmental security of other strategic infrastructures;
  - 5th Intelligence Directorate (Direktorat V), tasked for (i) intelligence IT development and intelligence production, (ii) production of intelligence, (iii) monitoring, lawful signal interception, signal intelligence, and clandestine operations, (iii) cyber intelligence, (iv) digital forensics, (v) coded transmissions, (vi) counterimagery, (vii) counterintelligence, (viii) digital audit and cybertesting, (ix) digital and cryptological human resource development, (x) intelligence technological research and development
- Deputy Attorney General on General Criminal (Jaksa Agung Muda Bidang Tindak Pidana Umum), oversees pretrials, additional investigations, indictments, legal actions, executions of court orders and sentencing, examinations and observations over paroles and other legal actions of general crimes. The office is assisted by several subordinate units:
  - General Criminal Affairs Secretariat (Sekretariat Jaksa Agung Muda Bidang Tindak Pidana Umum);
  - A Directorate (Direktorat A) on Crimes related to State Security, Persons, Property, and Money Laundering related to it;
  - B Directorate (Direktorat B) on Crimes related to Narcotics and Other Addictive Substances, Health and Pharmaceuticals, and Money Laundering related to it;
  - C Directorate (Direktorat C) on Crimes related to Terrorism, Human Trafficking, Transnational Crimes, Domestic Violence, Crimes against Women and Children, and Money Laundering related to it;
  - D Directorate (Direktorat D) on Crimes related to Financial Crimes, Cybercrime, Crimes against Natural Resources, and Money Laundering related to it;
  - E Directorate (Direktorat E) on Crimes related to Violations of Regional Legislations, Living Laws, and Customs, and Money Laundering related to it and Miscellanea;
- Deputy Attorney General on Special Criminal (Jaksa Agung Muda Bidang Tindak Pidana Khusus), oversees investigations, pre-indictments, additional investigations, indictments, legal actions, executions of court orders and sentencing examinations and observations over paroles and other legal actions of special crimes. The office is assisted by several subordinate units:
  - Special Criminal Affairs Secretariat (Sekretariat Jaksa Agung Muda Bidang Tindak Pidana Khusus);
  - Directorate of Investigation (Direktorat Penyidikan);
  - Directorate of Prosecution (Direktorat Penuntutan);
  - Directorate of Extraordinary Legal Actions, Executions, and Examinations (Direktorat Upaya Hukum Luar Biasa, Eksekusi, dan Eksaminasi);
  - Directorate of Grave Violation of Basic Human Rights (Direktorat Pelanggaran Hak Asasi Manusia Berat);
  - Directorate of Operational Control (Direktorat Pengendali Operasi)
- Deputy Attorney General on Civil and State Administrative (Jaksa Agung Muda Bidang Perdata dan Tata Usaha Negara), oversees law enforcement, legal assistance, legal opinions, and other legal actions toward the state or the government, which includes state institutions, central and regional government institutions, state- and regional-owned enterprises in civil and state administration cases, in order to secure and restore national assets and wealth, protect state and government honor, and provide public legal assistance. The office is assisted by several subordinate units:
  - Civil and State Administrative Affairs Secretariat (Sekretariat Jaksa Agung Muda Bidang Perdata dan Tata Usaha Negara);
  - Directorate on Civil Affairs (Direktorat Perdata);
  - Directorate on State Administrative Affairs (Direktorat Tata Usaha Negara); and
  - Directorate on Legal Consideration (Direktorat Pertimbangan Hukum).
- Deputy Attorney General on Military Criminal (Jaksa Agung Muda Bidang Pidana Militer), oversees technical cooperation for the purpose of indictments of military personnel with the military prosecutors (Oditurat), as well as on the civil-military judicial connection affairs. The office is assisted by several subordinate units:
  - Military Criminal Affairs Secretariat (Sekretariat Jaksa Agung Muda Bidang Tindak Pidana Militer);
  - Directorate on Military Justice Enforcement (Direktorat Penindakan);
  - Directorate on Prosecution (Direktorat Penuntutan); and
  - Directorate on Executions, Extraordinary Legal Actions, and Examinations (Direktorat Eksekusi, Upaya Hukum Luar Biasa, dan Eksaminasi)
- Deputy Attorney General on Supervision (Jaksa Agung Muda Bidang Pengawasan), oversees planning, execution, and control of oversight over the Service's performance and internal finances, and oversight duties over certain matters by the Attorney General's orders. The office is assisted by several subordinate units:
  - Oversight Affairs Secretariat (Sekretariat Jaksa Agung Muda Bidang Pengawasan);
  - Inspectorate I
  - Inspectorate II;
  - Inspectorate III;
  - Financial Inspectorate I;
  - Financial Inspectorate II;
  - Financial Inspectorate III;
- Education and Training Agency (Badan Pendidikan dan Pelatihan), oversees prosecutors' professional education and training, consisted of:
  - Education and Training Center for Management and Leadership
  - Education and Training Center for Functionaries
- Assets Recovery Agency (Badan Pemulihan Aset), oversees assets recovery, consisted of:
  - Center for Assets Management, Tracking, and Confiscation
  - Center for Assets Recovery
- Centers (Pusat), which consist of:
  - Law Enforcement Policy Strategy Center (Pusat Strategi Kebijakan Penegakan Hukum), performing strategic research for the attorney general, consisted of:
    - Division of Strategic Law Enforcement Policies in Intelligence, General Crimes, Civil Crimes, and State Administrative
    - Division of Strategic Law Enforcement Policies in Politics, Legal, Governance and Human Resource Development
  - Data, Crime Statistics, and Information Technology Center (Pusat Data, Statistik Kriminal, dan Teknologi Informasi), performing maintenance of criminal statistics and IT infrastructures and performing IT research and development for the attorney general, consisted of:
    - Division of Data Management and Criminal Statistics
    - Division of IT Application and Development
  - Legal Information Center (Pusat Penerangan Hukum), providing legal information, consisted of:
    - Division of Legal Information and Legal Extension
    - Division of Media and Public Relations
    - Division of Interinstitutional Relations
  - Justicial Health Center (Pusat Kesehatan Yustisial), providing health service for the attorney general and state prosecutors, including in management and operation of hospital and clinics.
    - Division of Justicial Health Service Operations
    - Division of Justicial Health Service Management
    - Adhyaksa Hospital
    - Health Clinics operated by Indonesian Public Prosecution Service

== Controversies ==
The Attorney General’s Office of Indonesia has been the subject of several controversies relating to its internal practices, public perception, and alleged operational conduct. Several reports stated irregularities in tender and non-tender procurements by the AGO, such as several high-value contracts without competitive bidding to a single private company for digital systems described as capable of automated content creation, narrative assignment, and propaganda.

In 2025, the office sanctioned over 150 prosecutors and administrative staff for misconduct as part of internal oversight efforts, drawing attention to longstanding complaints about ethical standards and accountability in prosecutorial conduct.

== List of attorneys general of Indonesia ==
| Attorneys General | | Term in Office | |
| Portrait | Name | Term start | Term end |
|---|---|---|---|
| | Gatot Taroenamihardja | 19 August 1945 | 22 October 1945 |
| | Kasman Singodimejo | 8 November 1945 | 6 May 1946 |
| | Tirtawinata | 22 July 1946 | 1951 |
| | Soeprapto | 1951 | 1959 |
| | Gatot Taroenamihardja (interim) | 1 April 1959 | 22 September 1959 |
| | Goenawan | 31 December 1959 | 1962 |
| | Kadaroesman | 1962 | 1964 |
| | Agustinus Michael Suthardio | 1964 | 1966 |
| | Soegih Arto | 1966 | 1973 |
| | Ali Said | 4 April 1973 | 18 February 1981 |
| | Ismail Saleh | 18 February 1981 | 30 May 1984 |
| | Hari Suharto | 4 June 1984 | 19 March 1988 |
| | Sukarton Marmosujono^{†} | 19 March 1988 | 29 June 1990 |
| | Singgih | 3 August 1990 | 14 March 1998 |
| | Soedjono Chanafiah Atmonegoro | 20 March 1998 | 15 June 1998 |
| | Andi Muhammad Ghalib | 15 June 1998 | 14 June 1999 |
| | Ismudjoko (Interim) | 14 June 1999 | 20 October 1999 |
| | Marzuki Darusman | 29 October 1999 | 1 June 2001 |
| | Baharuddin Lopa^{†} | 6 June 2001 | 3 July 2001 |
| | Suparman (Interim) | 4 July 2001 | 9 July 2001 |
| | Marsillam Simanjuntak | 10 July 2001 | 9 August 2001 |
| | Suparman (Interim) | 10 August 2001 | 14 August 2001 |
| | Muhammad Abdul Rachman | 14 August 2001 | 21 October 2004 |
| | Abdul Rahman Saleh | 21 October 2004 | 9 May 2007 |
| | Hendarman Supandji | 9 May 2007 | 24 September 2010 |
| | Darmono (Interim) | 24 September 2010 | 26 November 2010 |
| | Basrief Arief | 26 November 2010 | 20 October 2014 |
| | Andhi Nirwanto (Interim) | 21 October 2014 | 20 November 2014 |
| | Muhammad Prasetyo | 20 November 2014 | 21 October 2019 |
| | Arminsyah (Interim) | 21 October 2019 | 23 October 2019 |
| | Sanitiar Burhanuddin | 23 October 2019 | Incumbent |

^{† Died in office}

== Buildings of the attorney general's office ==
The Hoggerechtshof te Batavia building (left) next to the Paleis van Daendels overlooking the Waterlooplein. Currently, both structures were within the Finance Ministry complex.

The Attorney General's Office began at a time when the authority to prosecute and to adjudicate was unseparated. Its first office was shared with the first Supreme Court building complex in 2-4 Lapangan Banteng Timur street, nearby the Waterloosplein (now Lapangan Banteng, Jakarta). The building was previously used as the Hoggerechtshof te Batavia (an appellate court named the High Court of Batavia, now High Court of Jakarta), and currently it is occupied and managed by the Ministry of Finance, who also occupied and managed the Paleis van Daendels building next door.

The Hoggerechtshof building that was designed by architect Ir. Tramp and completed in 1825 during governor general Du Bus' tenure, was initially used as the headquarters of the Governors General of the Dutch East Indies. Then on 1 May 1848, the building was used by the recently established Departement van Justitie (Department of Justice), which oversaw the court system and the administration of justice in the colony. Sometime later, the classical style building with six pillars on the front was fully used as the Hoggerechtshof, which included the prosecutor's office.

Throughout the early Indonesian independence period, the prosecutor's office remained attached to the court in Jakarta, which through the Government Edict No. 9/1946, established Jakarta — and by extension the Hoggerechtshof building — as the seat of the Indonesian Supreme Court. Through the 1947 Act on the Organization and Authority of the Supreme Court and the Attorney General's Office (Indonesian: Undang-Undang Nomor 7 Tahun 1947 tentang Susunan Organisasi dan Kekuasaan Mahkamah Agung dan Kejaksaan Agung), it reaffirmed the relation between the supreme court and the attorney general's office.

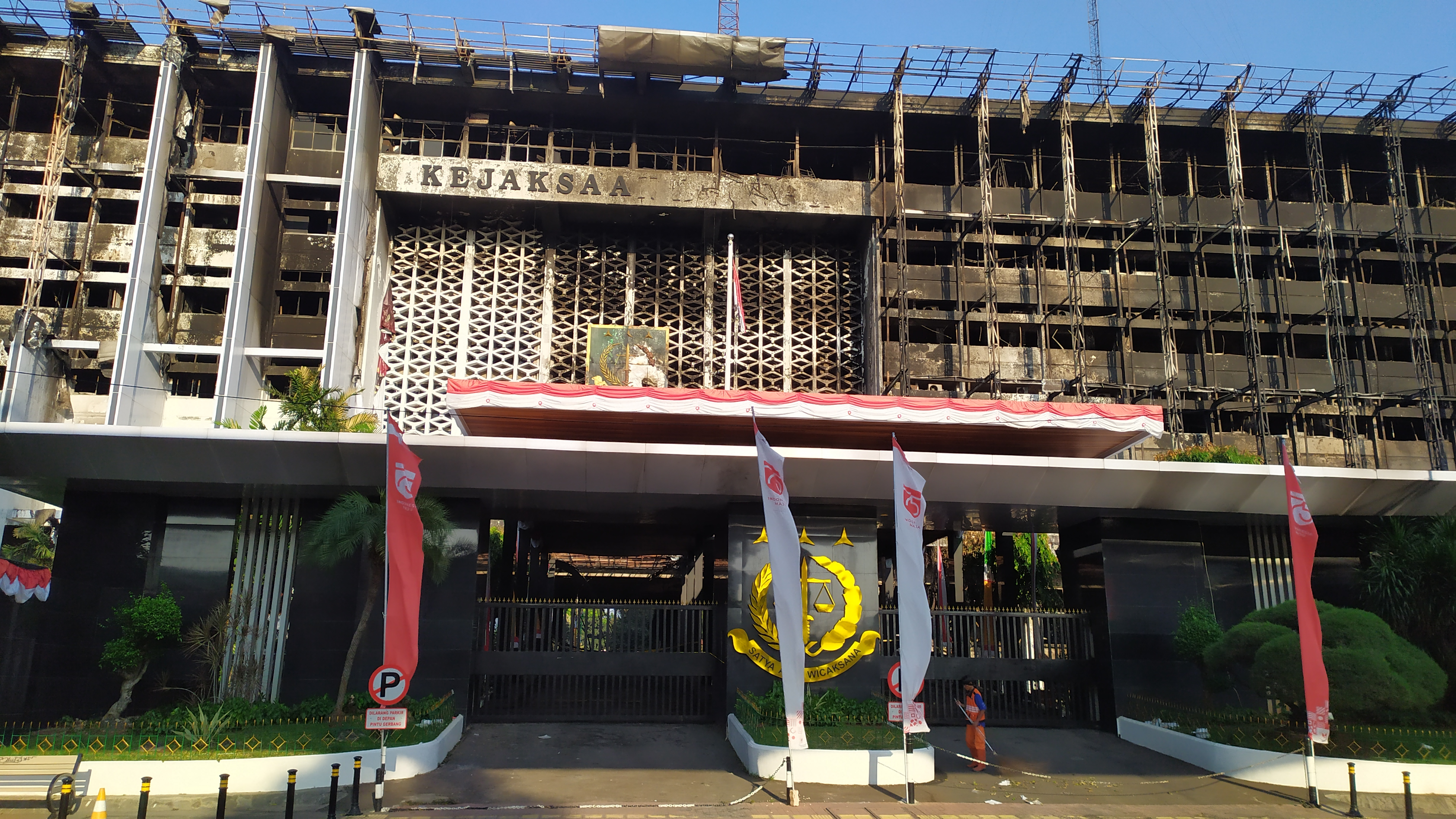
Main building of Attorney General's Office of Indonesia after the 2020 Fire.

Later with the promulgation of the 1961 Public Prosecution Service Act (Indonesian: Undang-Undang Nomor 15 Tahun 1961 tentang Ketentuan Pokok Kejaksaan), the attorney general's office was separated from the supreme court. In 1968 during the tenure of Attorney General Soegih Arto, the Office was moved out from the Supreme Court building to a site in 1 Sultan Hassanuddin street in Kebayoran Baru, which is its current site.

On 22 August 2020, the main building of the Attorney General's office complex caught on fire. The old building was demolished and was rebuilt. It was completed in late 2022.
