= Abdul Rahman Saleh (prosecutor) =

Indonesian politician (1941–2025)

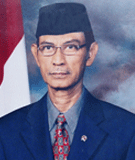

Ambassador of Indonesia to Denmark and Lithuania
- In office 8 April 2008 – 20 December 2011
- President: Susilo Bambang Yudhoyono
- Preceded by: Perwitorini Wijono
- Succeeded by: Bomer Pasaribu

Attorney General of Indonesia
- In office 21 October 2004 – 8 May 2007
- President: Susilo Bambang Yudhoyono
- Preceded by: M.A. Rachman
- Succeeded by: Hendarman Supandji

Personal details
- Born: 1 April 1941 Pekalongan, Dutch East Indies
- Died: 4 July 2025 (aged 84) Jakarta, Indonesia
- Education: Gadjah Mada University; University of Indonesia

Abdul Rahman Saleh (1 April 1941 – 4 July 2025; more commonly known as Arman) was an Indonesian journalist, actor, judge, prosecutor, and diplomat. He served as the Attorney General from 21 October 2004, to 9 May 2007, and later as the Ambassador of Indonesia to Denmark and Lithuania from 2008 to 2011. Previously, he served as a Supreme Court justice from 1999 to 2004, during the Abdurrahman Wahid and Megawati Soekarnoputri Presidencies.

== Early life ==
Saleh was born on 1 April 1941 in Pekalongan, Dutch East Indies. He completed his undergraduate studies at the Faculty of Law of Gadjah Mada University in 1967. Saleh then continued his education at the Faculty of Law of University of Indonesia, enrolling in the notary science in 1990 and the postgraduate program in 1995.

== Career ==
Arman began his career as a journalist at Harian Nusantara in Jakarta from 1968 to 1972. After that, he served as Director of the Jakarta Legal Defense Fund from 1981 to 1984. He also became the Secretary of the Board of Trustees at the Indonesian Legal Aid Foundation (YLBHI). Between 1992 and 1999, he practiced as a Notary and also served as a conveyancer.

He also starred in dozens of films. Around the 1980s, he played the lead role in the feature film Sunan Gunung Jati. Earlier, in the 1970s, he appeared in a film Cubit-cubitan alongside Elvy Sukaesih. He also co-starred with Christine Hakim in a film Petualang-petualang and Kabut Sutra Ungu, and shared the screen with Rae Sita in Ratu Disko.

Arman was later appointed a Supreme Court Justice in 1999 and served until 2004. During the administration of Susilo Bambang Yudhoyono, he was appointed Attorney General of the Republic of Indonesia, replacing M.A. Rachman. During his tenure, he was known for his strong commitment to fighting corruption. However, his decision to halt the prosecution of Soeharto on health grounds drew criticism from several people.

In 2008, he was appointed Ambassador Extraordinary and Plenipotentiary of the Republic of Indonesia to the Kingdom of Denmark, with concurrent accreditation to the Republic of Lithuania. He served in this role until 2011.

== Death ==
Saleh died in Jakarta on 4 July 2025, at the age of 84.

According to his eldest son, Lukman Hakim, his father initially only planned to undergo a routine medical check-up on 3 July 2025. However, on the way to the hospital, his physical condition suddenly deteriorated. “He was immediately taken to the emergency room and later had to be treated in the ICU. The doctors made every medical effort, from installing a heart stent to addressing fluid in the lungs,” he said.

== Work ==
- Saleh, Abdul Rachman (2008). Bukan kampung maling, bukan desa ustadz: memoar 930 hari di puncak gedung bundar (in Indonesian). Penerbit Buku Kompas. ISBN 978-979-709-373-0.

== Filmography ==
- Petualang-petualang (1977)
- Ratu Disko (1978)
- Cubit-cubitan (1979)
- Kabut Sutra Ungu (1980)
- Sunan Gunung Jati (1985)

Political offices
Preceded by MA Rachman	Attorney General of Indonesia; 21 October 2004 – 8 May 2007	Succeeded by Hendarman Supandji
