= Basrief Arief =

Attorney General of Indonesia (1947–2021)

Basrief Arief

Basrief Arief (23 January 1947 – 23 March 2021) was an Indonesian prosecutor who served as the Attorney General of Indonesia from 26 November 2010 until 20 October 2014. He was born in Tanjung Enim in South Sumatra.

As attorney general, he was responsible for state prosecutions. In 2011, he fired several officials of the Bojonegoro Prosecutor's Office in East Java, for their role in a case in which a wealthy female corruption convict paid another woman to serve her prison term.

He died on 23 March 2021, at the age of 74.
