= Sanitiar Burhanuddin =

Attorney general of indonesia

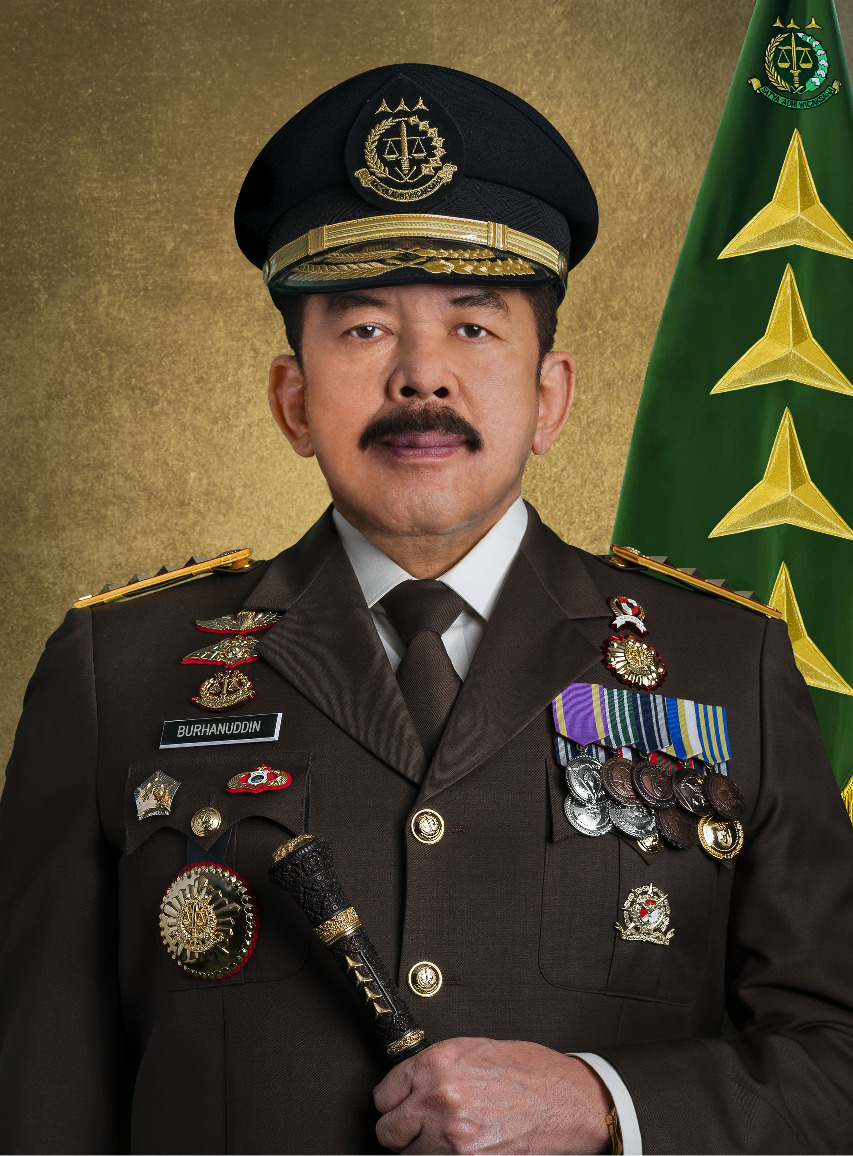
- Official portrait, 2019

Attorney General of Indonesia
- Incumbent
- Assumed office 23 October 2019
- President: Joko Widodo; Prabowo Subianto
- Preceded by: Muhammad Prasetyo

Personal details
- Born: July 17, 1954 (age 71) Majalengka, Indonesia

Military service
- Rank: Attorney General

Sanitiar Burhanuddin (17 July 1954) is the present Attorney General of Indonesia, serving since October 2019 in the cabinet of President Joko Widodo. He was previously deputy attorney general for civil and state administrative cases.

Upon his appointment, he denied having links to any political parties, despite his older brother, Tubagus Hasanuddin, being an executive of the ruling Indonesian Democratic Party of Struggle (PDI-P) and a former military secretary to former president and incumbent PDI-P leader Megawati Sukarnoputri.

In response to calls for the government to settle unresolved cases of human rights abuses, including the Semanggi shootings, Burhanuddin in January 2020 said the National Commission on Human Rights had not submitted complete evidence to the Attorney General's Office. He also said the incidents could not be classified as gross violations of human rights. Amnesty International Indonesia’s Executive Director Usman Hamid said Burhanuddin's "claims that these shootings did not violate human rights are simply not credible."

== Background ==
Burhanuddin's given name Sanitiar is commonly abbreviated to ST. He said this came about when he completed elementary school; his teacher wrote his name on his graduation certificate as ST Burhanuddin and the truncated name stuck.

He began his career at Jambi High Prosecutor's Office in 1989. He graduated from Diponegoro University's faculty of law and later served at District Attorney Offices in several regions, from Bangko in Jambi province to Cilacap in Central Java.

In 2007, Burhanuddin served as the attorney general's execution and examination director. He was head of the Provincial Prosecutor's Office of North Maluku from 2008 to 2009.

While serving as head of the South Sulawesi Provincial Prosecutor's Office and West Sulawesi Provincial Prosecutor's Office in 2010, Burhanuddin reportedly focused on handling corruption cases. In November 2010, he likened corruption to farting, saying there is a smell but no form. Therefore, his task was to prove the form.

Burhanuddin once had to deal with a corruption case involving the former regent of Gowa, Ichsan Yasin Limpo. Ichsan was the younger brother of Syahrul Yasin Limpo, a former governor of South Sulawesi, who was minister of agriculture for the 2019-2024 period.

Burhanuddin was Deputy Attorney General for Civil and State Administration from 2011 until retiring in 2014.

In 2015, he became President Commissioner of PT Hutama Karya, the holding company of state-owned enterprises in the infrastructure sector, overseeing Jasa Marga, Waskita Karya, Adhi Karya, and Yodya Karya. He resigned from the position in October 2019 after being appointed attorney general.

On October 29, 2024, the Attorney General's Office under Sanitiar Burhanuddin faced criticism for potentially politically motivated charges against former Minister of Trade Thomas Lembong, stemming from a minor procedural matter ten years ago, which has raised concerns about the integrity of the office in handling corruption cases. This incident has sparked debate regarding the impartiality of the AGO's actions in politically sensitive situations, particularly in light of Lembong's previous high-profile roles in government and his known opposition to the incoming government. The journalist alleged that a senior AGO official who has close ties to Gerindra’s leadership, is pushing for the investigation into the case to show he deserves the AGO top post.
