= Muhammad Prasetyo =

Indonesian politician (born 1947)

H. Muhammad Prasetyo

H. Muhammad Prasetyo (born 9 May 1947 in Tuban, Indonesia) is a former Attorney General of Indonesia, serving from October 2014 to 20 October 2019. Prior to taking up the role Prasetyo was an executive of the NasDem party.

== Death penalty role ==
Prasetyo has been an outspoken supporter of the use of the death penalty in Indonesia. He was the presiding attorney general overseeing the executions of two members of the Bali Nine.
