= Ministry of Internal Revenue =

Indonesian government ministry

- Kementerian Penerimaan Negara

Ministry overview
- Formed: TBA
- Jurisdiction: Government of Indonesia
- Minister responsible: TBA, Minister of Internal Revenue

The Ministry of Internal Revenue (Indonesian: Kementerian Penerimaan Negara, lit. 'Ministry of State Revenue'), was a planned ministry in the Prabowo Cabinet tasked with collecting Indonesian taxes, customs, and excise and administering the Indonesian Internal Revenue Code (which currently regulated by Omnibus Law for Harmonization of Taxation Regulations, Law No. 7/2021). Prabowo Subianto announced the existence of this ministry on 25 September 2024. Prabowo asserted that this ministry would exist in his incoming administration.

This ministry resulted from a future spin-off of the Directorate General of Taxes and Directorate General of Customs and Excise. Once fully established, this ministry will be the Indonesian counterpart of the United States Internal Revenue Service.

== History ==
In December 2023, Gibran Rakabuming Raka, then vice-presidential candidate, voiced his intention to combine the Directorate General of Taxes and the Directorate General of Customs and Excise of the Ministry of Finance. He voiced his intention in the vice-presidency candidacy debate. In their campaign, Prabowo and Gibran confirmed that they would do so. According to Drajad Wibowo, a member of the Board of Experts of the Prabowo-Gibran campaign, this fusion intended to maximize state revenue through tax, customs, and excise.

It was confirmed that Prabowo will name the Minister of Internal Revenue on 20 September 2024. But, on the inauguration of the Red White Cabinet, it was not announced, as the plan to realize the ministry was quashed by Sri Mulyani.

However, on 11 June 2025, the plan of formation of the new ministry resurfaced, even the complete structure is already tabled by President Prabowo Subianto.

== Planned Organization Structure ==
As revealed on 11 June 2025, the planned ministry organized as follows. Unique from another ministries in Indonesia, the ministry contains steering committee part which somewhat fashioned similar to National Research and Innovation Agency and Pancasila Ideology Development Agency.

1. Steering Committee of the Ministry of Internal Revenue/Chair of Indonesian Internal Revenue Authority
  1. Coordinating Minister for Economic Affairs (Ex-officio Chair of the Steering Committee of the Ministry of Internal Revenue/Indonesian Internal Revenue Authority)
  2. Commander of Indonesian National Armed Forces (Ex-officio Member of the Steering Committee of the Ministry of Internal Revenue/Indonesian Internal Revenue Authority)
  3. Commander of Indonesian National Police (Ex-officio Member of the Steering Committee of the Ministry of Internal Revenue/Indonesian Internal Revenue Authority)
  4. Attorney General of Indonesia (Ex-officio Member of the Steering Committee of the Ministry of Internal Revenue/Indonesian Internal Revenue Authority)
  5. Head of Financial Transaction Reports and Analysis Center (Ex-officio Member of the Steering Committee of the Ministry of Internal Revenue/Indonesian Internal Revenue Authority).
  6. 4 Independents
2. Office of Minister of Internal Revenue/Chair of Indonesian Internal Revenue Authority
3. Office of Deputy Minister of Internal Revenue/Chair of Indonesian Internal Revenue Authority for Internal Affairs
4. Office of Deputy Minister of Internal Revenue/Chair of Indonesian Internal Revenue Authority for External Affairs
5. Office of Main Secretariat of Internal Revenue/Chair of Indonesian Internal Revenue Authority
  1. Bureau of Human Resources
  2. Bureau of Finance
  3. Bureau of Equipment and State-owned Properties
  4. Bureau of Legal Advocation
  5. Bureau of Communications, Reports, and Information
6. Deputy for Planning and Regulation of Revenues (Deputy I)
  1. Directorate of Revenue Planning
  2. Directorate of Revenue Potentials
  3. Directorate of Income Tax Regulation
  4. Directorate of Value-added Tax Regulation
  5. Directorate of Goods and Services Taxes, Tax Deductions, and Levies Regulation
  6. Directorate of Tax Facility and Incentive
  7. Directorate of International Taxation Partnership
7. Deputy for Tax Monitoring and Revenue (Deputy II)
  1. Directorate of Tax Revenue from Natural Resources
  2. Directorate of Tax Revenue from Industry and Trade
  3. Directorate of Tax Revenue from Telematics
  4. Directorate of Tax Revenue from Services, Financial Sectors, and Banking
  5. Directorate of Excise Revenue
  6. Directorate of Tax and Excise Investigation
8. Deputy for Non-tax State Revenues Monitoring and Revenue (Deputy III)
  1. Directorate of Regulation, Planning, and Monitoring of Non-tax State Revenues
  2. Directorate of Fund Management
  3. Directorate of Separated State Wealth
  4. Directorate of State Treasury
  5. Directorate of Excise Revenue
  6. Directorate of Natural Resources, Maritime Resources, and Varieties
9. Deputy for Custom Monitoring and Revenue (Deputy IV)
  1. Directorate of Custom Techniques
  2. Directorate of Custom Facilities
  3. Directorate of Custom Audit
  4. Directorate of Custom Information
  5. Directorate of Custom Enforcement
  6. Directorate of Narcotics Interdiction
  7. Directorate of International Customs Partnership
  8. Directorate of Fleet and Patrols
10. Deputy for Law Enforcement (Deputy V)
  1. Directorate of Law Enforcement Planning and Evaluation
  2. Directorate of Integrated Inspection
  3. Directorate of Objection, Appeals, and Judicial Review
  4. Directorate of Collection and Auction
  5. Directorate of Investigation
  6. Directorate of Prosecution
11. Deputy for Intelligence (Deputy VI)
  1. Directorate of Foreign Intelligence
  2. Directorate of Financial Transaction
  3. Directorate of Natural Resources Intelligence
  4. Directorate of Telematics and Cyber Intelligence
  5. Directorate of Foods, Beverages, and Drinking Water Industries Intelligence
  6. Directorate of Drugs and Petrochemicals Intelligence
  7. Directorate of Textile and Garments Intelligence
  8. Directorate of Oil Palm, Estate Crops, and Plantation Intelligence
12. Main Inspectorate
  1. Tax Inspection Inspectorate
  2. Non-tax State Revenue Inspectorate
  3. Anti-Corruption and Anti-Gratification Inspectorate
  4. Customs Inspectorate
  5. Investigation Inspectorate
  6. Proceedings Division
13. Centers
  1. Center for Data Science and Information
    1. Data Analytics Division
    2. Blockchain Division
    3. Artificial Intelligence Division
    4. Hardware and Software Division
    5. Cybersecurity Division
    6. Infographic Division
  2. Center for Research and Employee Education
    1. Tax Education Division
    2. Customs Education Division
    3. Policy Research Division
    4. Employee Basic Training Division
    5. Specialized Education Division
    6. Commando Training and Education Division
14. Provincial Representative Offices
