= Law enforcement in Indonesia =

Law enforcement in Indonesia is mainly performed by the Indonesian National Police (POLRI), together with other law enforcement agencies which are under the president, a certain ministry or State-owned company (BUMN) which perform policing duties for a certain public service, these law enforcement agencies are under supervision and are trained by the Indonesian National Police. The Indonesian National Police is basically the national civilian police force of the country responsible for enforcing law and order of the state.

== Police forces ==
=== Indonesian National Police ===
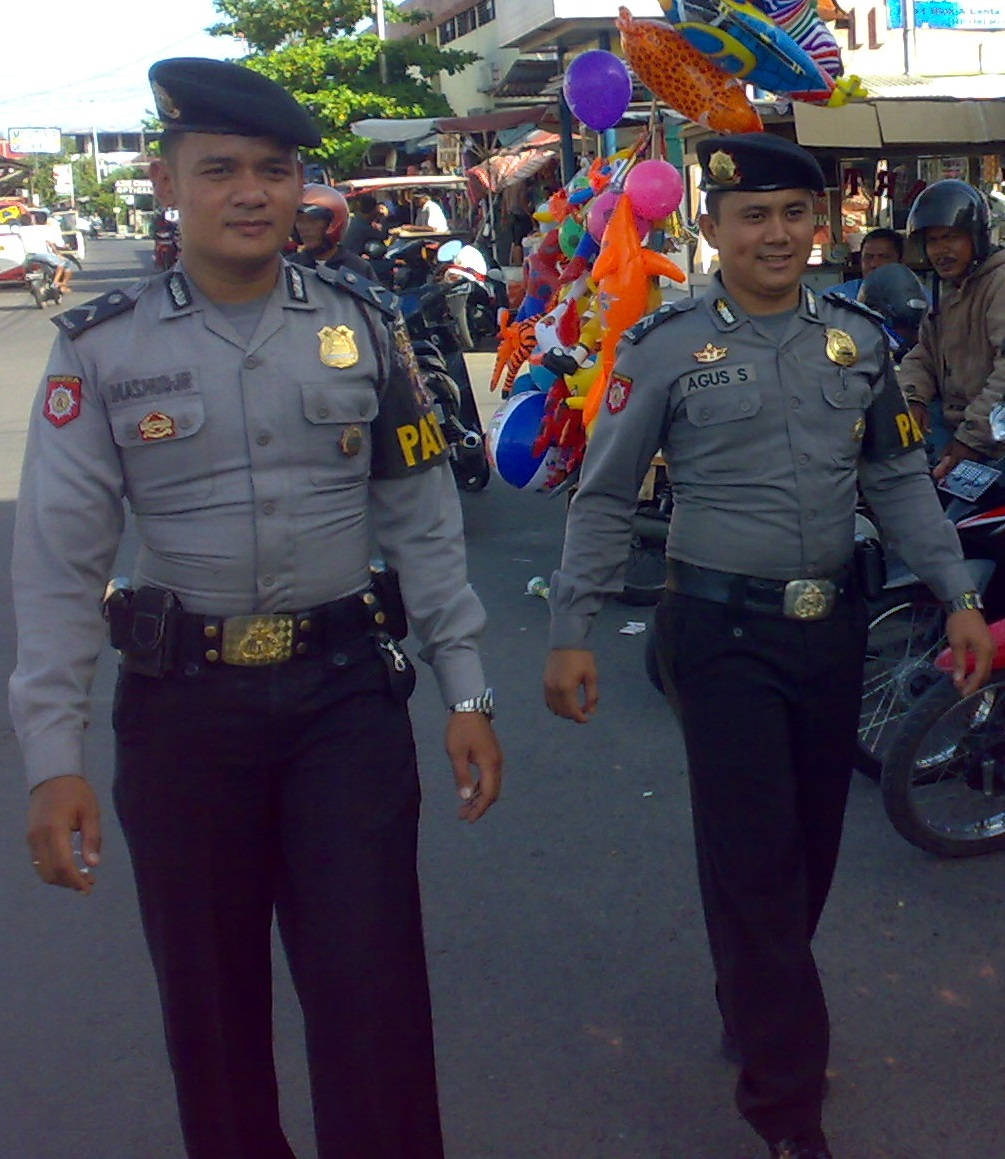
Policemen of the Indonesian National Police

The Indonesian National Police (POLRI) is the main agency responsible for maintaining security and public order, law enforcement, and provide protection and service to the community in Indonesia. The force is a centralised organisation with responsibilities ranging from traffic control, criminal investigation, intelligence gathering and counter-terrorism duties. The Indonesian National Police is the national policing force of Indonesia with its headquarters located in Jakarta. It is under the auspices of the President of Indonesia. The highest command of the national police in Indonesia is executed in Jakarta, at the Indonesian National Police Headquarters (Mabes Polri) located at Trunojoyo Street, Kebayoran Baru, South Jakarta. The National Police HQ oversees every provincial police of the country, each Province of Indonesia has its own Police Headquarters known as "POLDA" an abbreviation of Kepolisian Daerah (Regional Police) in Indonesian, it oversees several city or regional police departments which are responsible for a city or regency (Kabupaten) in the province, it is known as "POLRES" (Kepolisian Resort), a "Polres" then oversees several police stations responsible for a sub-district (kecamatan) known as "POLSEK" (Kepolisian Sektor).

==== Special units of the Indonesian National Police ====
- Detachment 88 (Densus 88)

The Detachment 88 or known locally as "Densus 88" is the special counter-terrorism unit of the Indonesian National Police.

- Mobile Brigade Corps (Brimob)

The Mobile Brigade Corps or known locally as "Brimob" is the paramilitary force of the Indonesian National Police tasked to conduct high-risk law enforcement such as counterinsurgency, riot control, and hostage rescue. It is the PTU and SWAT unit of Polri. Their uniform is the same like other police units, but wear a dark blue beret as their headgear, during urban-operational duties, they wear black uniforms and during jungle-operational duties, they wear green. Each provincial police headquarters (Polda) in Indonesia has a Brimob unit.

=== Municipal police ===
The Municipal Police Units (Indonesian: Satuan Polisi Pamong Praja abbreviated "Satpol PP") are municipal police units which are controlled by the local governments in the country (either province, regency, or city), it is under the supervision of the Ministry of Home Affairs. Their responsibilities are to enforce local laws, such as taking action against illegal settlements and structures in the city, bring order towards street vendors and buskers, and to ensure the safety of city property. They are also responsible to secure the office of the City Mayor and provincial Governor. Their operational uniform color is greenish-dark Khaki, in Jakarta they sometimes wear orange polo shirts with khaki cargo pants.

=== Forestry police ===
The Indonesia Forest Rangers (Indonesian: Polisi Kehutanan abbreviated "Polhut") is under the Ministry of Environment and Forestry. One of their responsibilities is to take action against illegal logging and patrol national parks of the country.

=== Prison police ===
The Prison Police (Indonesian: Polisi Khusus Lembaga Pemasyarakatan abbreviated Polsuspas) are Correctional Officers under the Ministry of Law and Human Rights, they control and supervise prisons across the country. Their uniform color is blue.

=== Railroad police ===
The Railroad Police (Indonesian: Polisi Khusus Kereta Api abbreviated Polsuska) is the railway police unit which is under the auspices of the Indonesian Railway Company. They are not under a certain ministry, rather they are part of the Directorate of Safety and Security of the Indonesian Railway Company, but are trained and educated by the Indonesian National Police. Their uniform is black and wear orange berets, they are usually posted in Railway stations.

=== Remote Islands and Coastal Development police ===
The Police for Management of Marine, Coastal Region and Remote Islands (Polisi Khusus Pengelolaan Wilayah Pesisir dan Pulau-Pulau Kecil abbreviated Polsus PWP3K) is a newly specialized-formed policing unit under the Ministry of Maritime Affairs and Fisheries, their authority includes conducting patrols in coastal areas and remote islands and to take action towards complaints regarding activities that damage natural maritime resources.

=== Qarantine special police ===
Qarantine special police (Indonesian: Kepolisian Khusus Badan Karantina Indonesia) is a special law enforcement unit under the Indonesian Quarantine Agency with limited police authority to support enforcement of animal, fish, and plant quarantine laws through security, patrols, and non judicial actions at entry and exit points. It was formed in 2023 by merging the agricultural, animal and fisheries quarantine police units.

=== Military Police Corps ===
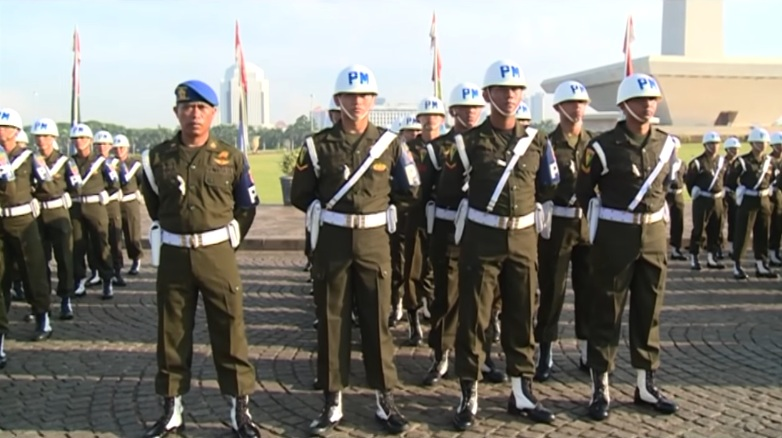
Indonesian military policemen

In Indonesia, the Military Police Command (Indonesian: Pusat Polisi Militer TNI abbreviated "Puspom TNI") is the only institution which has authority to conduct law enforcement towards active members of the Indonesian Military, it is an institution which is directly under the auspices of the Indonesian National Armed Forces Headquarters ("Mabes TNI") which heads the three Military Police corps which are the:

- Indonesian Army Military Police Command
- Indonesian Navy Military Police Command, and the
- Indonesian Air Force Military Police Command

The Military Police does not have authority towards civilians as it is the realm of the Indonesian National Police (Polri), and in the other hand, the civilian Police does not have authority towards active members of the military, except accompanied by the Military police. If a military member is caught red-handed by the civilian police, then the violator will be sent to the Military Police or the Military police would be contacted.

== Maritime law enforcement agencies ==
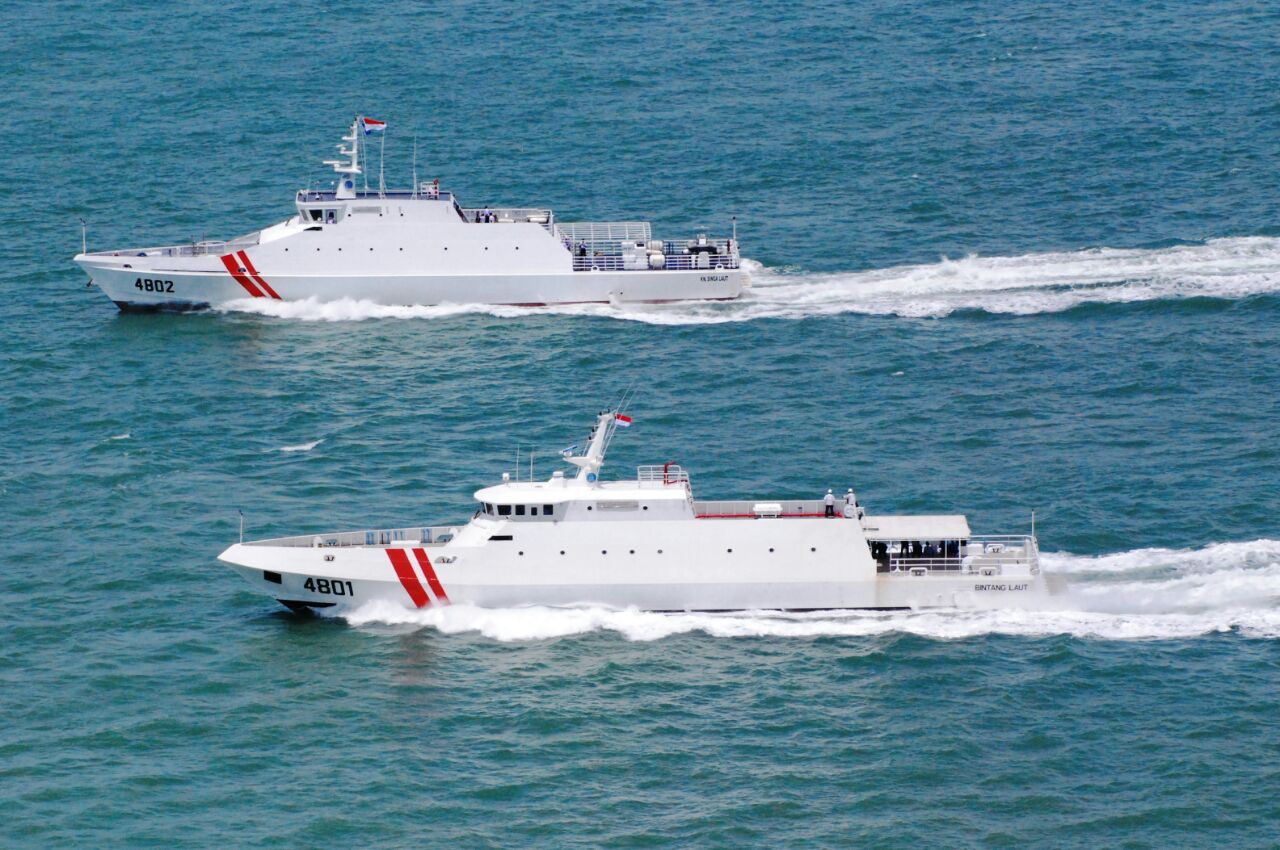
Patrol boats of the Maritime Security Agency (Bakamla)

=== Maritime Security Agency ===
The Maritime Security Agency (Badan Keamanan Laut abbreviated Bakamla) is a maritime patrol of the Republic of Indonesia. Bakamla is a non-ministerial government institution which reports directly to the President through the Coordinating Ministry for Political, Legal, and Security Affairs. Bakamla's duty is to conduct security and safety patrols in the territorial waters of Indonesia and the jurisdiction of Indonesia.

=== Sea and Coast Guard ===
The Sea and Coast Guard (Kesatuan Penjagaan Laut dan Pantai – KPLP) is an agency of the Government of Indonesia which has the main function to ensure the safety of shipping activity inside the Indonesian Maritime Zone. The "KPLP" has the task to formulate and execute policies, standards, norms, guidelines, criteria and procedures, as well as technical guidance, evaluation and reporting concerning maritime patrol and security, which is conducted in coordination with other maritime law enforcement agencies of the country such as BAKAMLA, Indonesian National Police Water Unit, and also in certain cases with the Indonesian Navy. KPLP is under the auspices of the Directorate General of Sea Transportation of the Indonesian Ministry of Transportation.

=== National Police Marine and Air Unit ===
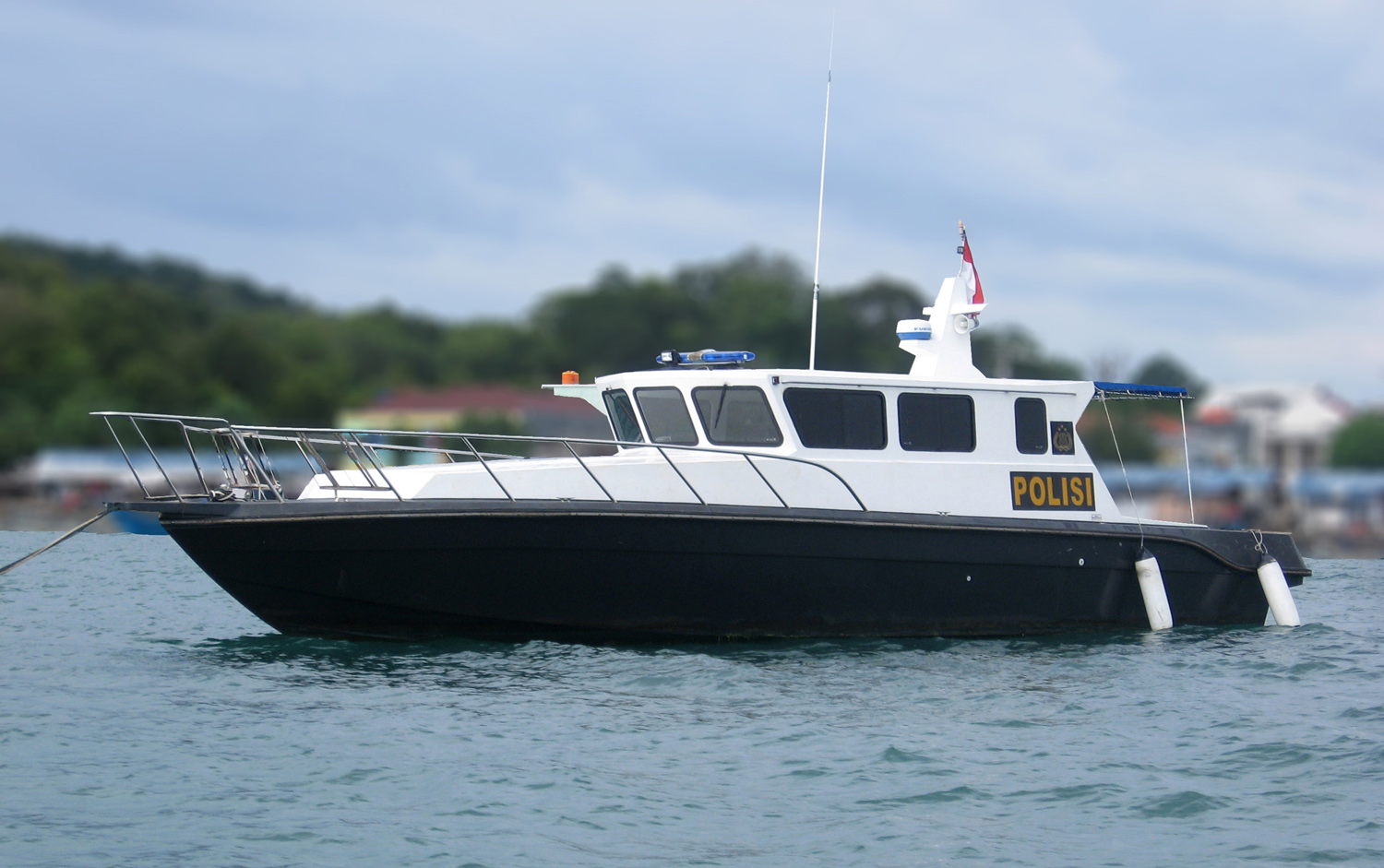
An Indonesian National Police patrol boat

The Indonesian National Police has a water unit (Polisi Perairan dan Udara abbreviated "Polairud") responsible to conduct law enforcement and enforce security and order of the coast and state waters.

=== Marine and Fisheries Resources Surveillance ===
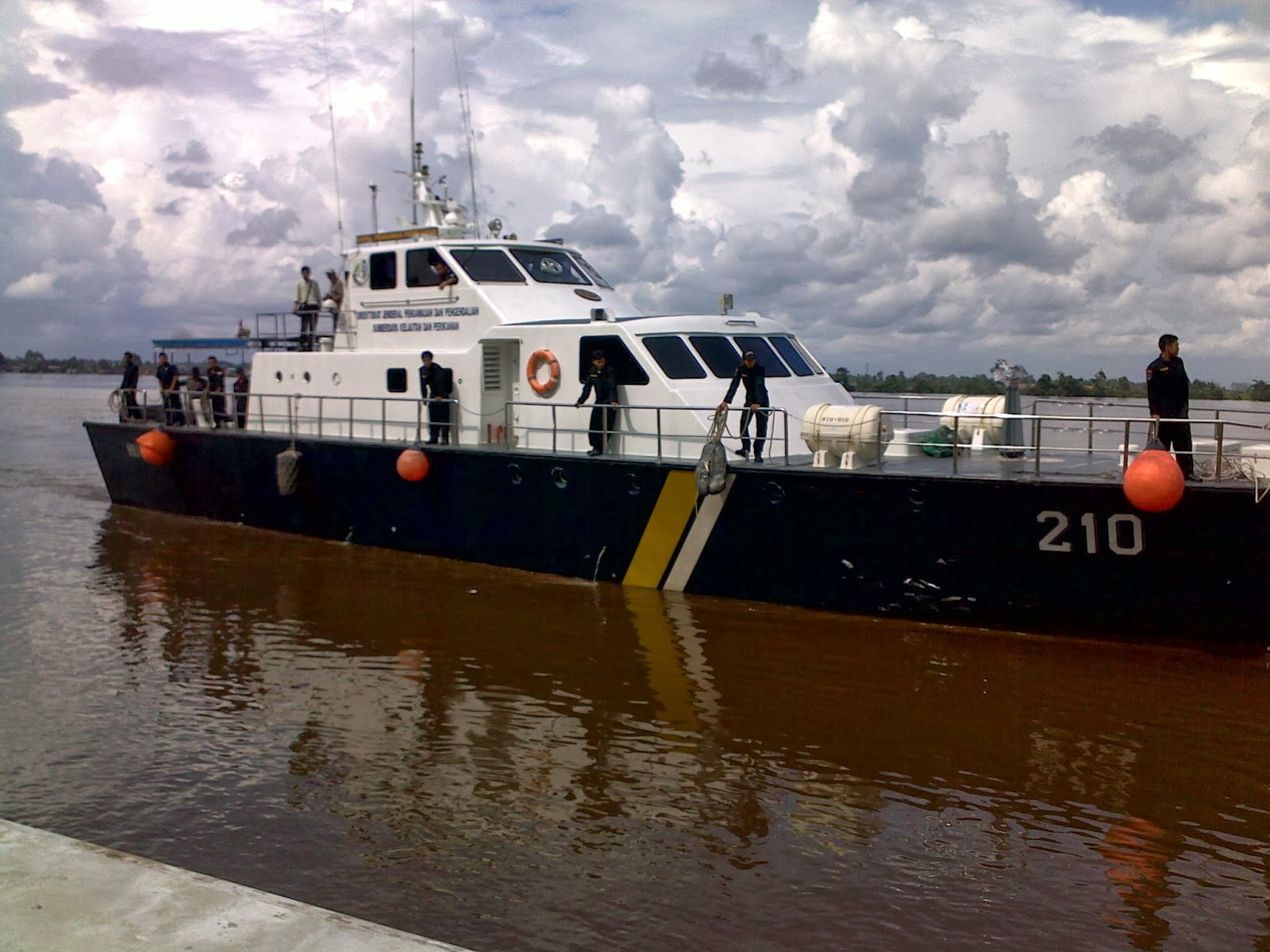
A Marine and Fisheries Resources Surveillance patrol boat

The Marine and Fisheries Resources Surveillance (Pengawasan Sumber Daya Kelautan dan Perikanan - PSDKP) is a government agency under the management of the Ministry of Marine Affairs and Fisheries of Indonesia. Formally established on 23 November 2000 according to Presidential Decree No. 165/2000, the PSDKP is the agency responsible for supervising the marine and fishery resources of the Republic of Indonesia.

=== Criticism ===
Political observers in Indonesia have raised numerous criticisms regarding the presence of multiple maritime law enforcement agencies, noting their tendency to overlap in authority within the country's maritime zones. By 2015, these enforcement activities were managed by 12 different agencies from various government ministries. Additionally, the constitution allows the Navy to conduct maritime law enforcement under specific circumstances. Plans to consolidate these agencies into a unified national entity, akin to the Coast Guard of the United States of America and Coast Guard of India, have been in motion since 2011. In February 2020, President Joko Widodo announced his intention to establish the Maritime Security Agency as Indonesia's coast guard. Subsequently, in March 2022, the government issued regulations governing maritime security, safety, and law enforcement in Indonesia's territorial waters and jurisdiction, designating the Maritime Security Agency as the coordinating body for all maritime law enforcement efforts. However, the third revision of Law No. 17/2008 on Shipping, passed by the House of Representatives in September 2024, designates Sea and Coast Guard (KPLP) as the sole coast guard authority, creating legal conflicts with the Maritime Security Agency, which has been using the title "Indonesia Coast Guard" despite lacking such recognition. This overlap raises concerns about legal clarity and the effectiveness of Indonesia's maritime law enforcement, both domestically and in the context of international cooperation.

== Other law enforcement agencies ==
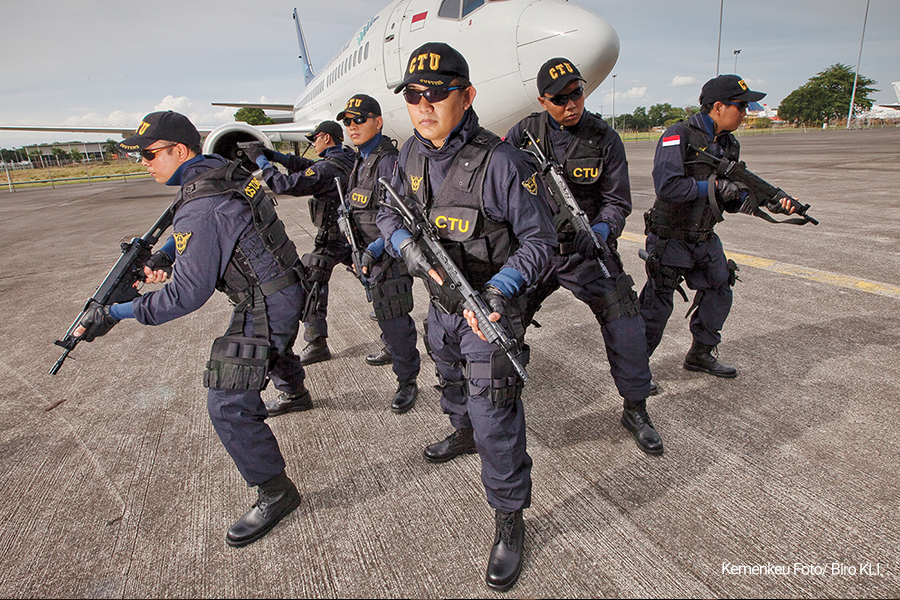
Indonesian Customs Tactical Unit (CTU) of the Directorate General of Customs and Excise

Other types of government agencies which is involved in law enforcement of the state:

1. Public Prosecution Service
2. Corruption Eradication Commission (KPK)
3. National Narcotics Board (BNN), specialized agency for prevention and investigation of illicit drugs abuse.
4. National Agency for Combating Terrorism (BNPT)
5. Directorate General of Customs and Excise
6. Tax Office, enforce law in taxation.
7. Directorate General of Immigration, enforce law concerning immigration.
8. Financial Services Authority (OJK)
9. Nuclear Regulatory Agency (BAPETEN), enforce law in nuclear energy.
10. National Agency of Drug and Food Control (BPOM), oversee foods, drugs, and cosmetics in Indonesia.
11. Directorate General of Post and Informatics Devices Resource of the Ministry of Communication and Informatics, enforce law in information technology and radiowaves.
12. Ministry of Energy and Mineral Resources
13. Ministry of Industry
14. Ministry of Trade
15. Ministry of Health
16. Ministry of Transportation, oversee and enforce law in the realm of transportation (land, sea and air). The Traffic Wardens (Dishub) in Indonesia are under the command of the Ministry of Transportation which are responsible to conduct law enforcement towards yellow-plate vehicles (public transportation vehicles and other over-sized vehicles) and also take action towards parking violators. They also assist the traffic police in directing traffic. They wear light-blue for their shirt and dark blue for their pants as their uniform.

== See also ==
- Crime in Indonesia
- Laws of Indonesia
- Traffic wardens in Indonesia
- Babinsa
