= Excise in Indonesia =

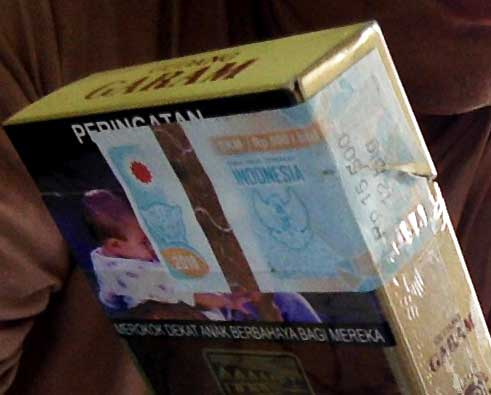
Excise tape on Cigarette one of major excise practise in Indonesia

Excise in Indonesia is a policy in Indonesia which mandates levies on certain goods that have certain characteristics, such as cigarettes, e-cigarettes, alcohol, and other tobacco and alcohol derivative products. In Indonesia, Directorate General of Customs and Excise, Ministry of Finance of the Republic of Indonesia is responsible for collecting excise.

== Benefit ==
Usually in Indonesia excise is imposed more because of the negative influence on society and the environment of the product, in addition to earning income. So that the imposition of excise expenses is expected to reduce the consumption of these products. While for cigarette excise, in addition to suppressing consumption, the Perpres explicitly also requires that cigarette excise tax be used as a health fund through the BPJS budget in the region. The characteristics of goods affected by excise in Indonesia include:

- the consumption needs to be controlled,
- the circulation needs to be monitored,
- its use can have a negative effect on society or the environment, or its use needs to be imposed on state levies for justice and balancing reason.

== History ==
The history of excise in Indonesia is linked to the existence of customs. Logically, this organization has logically existed since the earliest kingdom establishment and the trading in and out through sea and land transportation was done. But literally, the one who established customs was the Dutch Colonial Government, with the name De Dienst der Invoer en Uitvoerrechten en Accijnzen or the free translation of the Import and Export Service and Excise. His job is to collect invoer-rechten (entry duties), uitvoer-rechten (exit duties), and accijnzen (excise). If Bea (customs) word comes from Sanskrit, then cukai comes from Indian Language, which if translated in English means "excise", hence Bea dan Cukai.

Later regulation which underlies customs and excise was Besluit Gouvernment Number 33 dated December 22, 1928, which was later amended by a government decree dated June 1, 1934. During the Japanese occupation, new rules were made the task of arranging import duties and export duties is eliminated, while Customs only takes care of excise, ruled by Undang-Undang No 13 concerning the Opening of Government Offices in Java and Sumatra on 29 April 1942 In the past many goods were affected by excise because the colonial government tried as hard as possible to limit the circulation of goods needed by the people. One of those affected by excise is sugar and cement. But at this time only cigarettes, alcohol, and electric cigarettes were affected by excise. But in the future, it is possible for other items to be subject to excise.

Under Indonesian rule, Customs and Excise was held again on October 1, 1946, under the name Pejabatan Bea dan Cukai (Customs and Excise Office). At that time the Deputy Finance Minister, Sjafrudin Prawiranegara, appointed R.A Kartadjoemena as the first Head of Customs and Excise. Based on Peraturan Pemerintah No 51 Tahun 1948, the term Pejabatan Bea dan Cukai changed to Jawatan Bea dan Cukai, which lasted until 1965. After 1965 until now, the name became the Dirjen Bea dan Cukai (Directorate General of Customs and Excise).

== Reformation of the bureau ==
Since the 1998 reformation era, various improvements have been made in organizations that were once known to be vulnerable to corruption, collusion, and nepotism. Customs and Excise continues to clean up and settle the problems that make the entry and exit of goods in Indonesia become complicated and vulnerable to fraud. This effort has been appreciated by GIMMI, the Indonesian Vegetable Oil Industry Association, such as effort to reduce the number of disputes in determining the classification of goods. In addition, several other areas that are also being improved are industrial and trading facilitation, services enhancement, community protection, and revenue optimization. One of the major activities which is also being promoted by the Customs in this reform is the Program Penertiban Impor Berisiko Tinggi (Control of High Risk Imported Good Program).

== Difference between tax and excise ==
Excise is imposed on a commodity because of the negative influence of the commodity on the community and the environment, not merely to increase the country's income. The imposition of excise expenses is expected to reduce the consumption of these products.
