= Indonesia–United States Free Trade Agreement =

Bilateral trade agreement

Indonesia-United States Free Trade Agreement (English); Perjanjian Perdagangan Bebas Indonesia-Amerika Serikat (Indonesian)
- Type: Free trade agreement
- Parties: Indonesia; United States

The Indonesia-United States Free Trade Agreement is a proposed bilateral free trade agreement between Indonesia and the United States in 2023. It was made on the possibility of a limited free trade agreement aimed to encourage trade between the two countries, particularly in the sector of rare earth materials involving nickel.

During the Biden administration, Indonesia and the United States upgraded its bilateral relations to a comprehensive strategic partnership, but exploration talks for a critical mineral FTA have stagnated due to congressional pushback from the Senate.

== History ==
=== Biden administration ===
In April 2023, the Jokowi administration through Coordinating Minister for Maritime Affairs and Investment Luhut Pandjaitan stated that Indonesia will propose a limited free trade agreement with the United States, particularly on the mineral and mining sector involving nickel. According to the United States Geological Survey, Indonesia has the largest reserves of nickel with around 55 million ton and is the largest producer of nickel with around 1.8 million tons produced in 2023. Luhut argued that a free trade agreement would see Indonesia export its nickels to the United States to be processed and used on electric vehicles, which would make EV cars eligible for a full $7,500 tax credit under the Biden administration's Inflation Reduction Act.

During an ASEAN summit in 2023 held at Jakarta, Vice President Kamala Harris met with Indonesian President Joko Widodo to discuss elevating Indonesia-US relations to a comprehensive strategic partnership, as well as exploring the idea of a limited critical mineral-specific free trade agreement with the United States.

=== Second Trump administration ===
In January 2025, Indonesian Coordinating Minister for Economic Affairs Airlangga Hartarto and Indonesian Minister of Trade Budi Santoso spoke to the press that the Prabowo administration was confident that Indonesia will continue to cooperate with the second Trump administration on a bilateral free trade agreement with the US despite tariff threats and congressional opposition.

== Reception ==
The idea received a lukewarm response from the Biden administration. During Jokowi's visit to Washington, D.C. with US President Joe Biden, the Biden administration is committed to developing a critical minerals plan with Indonesia to strengthen its resilience and build sustainability in its supply chain.

The proposal received significant pushback from the United States Senate. A bipartisan group of senators including Kevin Cramer (R-ND), Tina Smith (D-MN), John Fetterman (D-PA), Tammy Baldwin (D-WI), Joe Manchin (I-WV), Sherrod Brown (D-OH), Amy Klobuchar (D-MN), Lisa Murkowski (R-AK), and Bill Cassidy (R-LA) wrote a letter to United States Trade Representative Katherine Tai, objecting a possible Indonesia-US free trade agreement due to Indonesia's weak labor protections, dominance of Chinese firms in Indonesian mining and refining, and lack of environmental protection laws in the country. Luhut responded by writing an op-ed piece to the Foreign Policy magazine, arguing that "the IRA and Senate opposition to a free trade deal with Jakarta are undermining the United States' green transition," and accused the US senators of working together with Indonesia's "foreign competitors."

In September 2024, the United States Department of Labor added Indonesian nickel to its list of goods produced by child or forced labor. The Department of Labor voiced concerns regarding the poor treatment of Chinese miners from Chinese mining firms in Indonesia from passport confiscating, surveillance, and overall restriction to miners' freedom of movement. Director of Labor Norms Inspection Yuli Adiratna of the Indonesian Ministry of Manpower responded to the DoL report that it will improve supervision on its commodity sector and would use the report as a basis. A spokesperson from the US Embassy in Jakarta spoke to The Jakarta Post that the forced labor designation does not prompt sanctions towards Indonesia.

Writing to The Diplomat, Cullen Hendrix of the Peterson Institute for International Economics argued that while the name and shame tactic could help pressure the Indonesian government to improve its labor protection laws to achieve its FTA goals, he criticized the move might push Indonesia closer to China.
