= Taxation in Indonesia =

Taxation in Indonesia includes income tax, value added tax (goods and sales tax) and carbon tax.

== Definitions ==
Indonesian taxation is based on Article 23A of UUD 1945 (1945 Indonesian Constitution), where tax is an enforceable contribution exposed on all Indonesian citizens, foreign nationals and residents who have resided for 183 cumulative days within a twelve-month period or are present for at least one day with intent to remain. Generally if one is present less than 120 days, then no tax is owed except on Indonesia source income. Some tax treaties may supersede this or defer to the Indonesia presence test for the year in question. Tax treaties deal with taxation of foreign source income for services rendered in Indonesia which are generally taxed if performed for 120+ days (depending upon treaty) even though one may not be a tax resident. Indonesia has a stratification of taxation including Income Tax, Local Tax (Pajak Daerah) and Central Government Tax.

== The Indonesian Taxation Laws ==
The relevant fundamental taxation laws of Indonesia include, sorted by enactment:

- Land Tax and Building Tax Law ("Undang-undang Pajak Bumi dan Bangunan - UU PBB"): Law No. 12/1985 amended by Law No. 12/1994;
- Warrant for Tax Collection Law ("Undang-undang Penagihan Pajak dengan Surat Paksa/UU PPSP"): Emergency Law No. 27/1957, stipulated as a law by Law No. 19/1959, amended by Law No. 10/1968, repealed by Law No. 19/1997, amended by Law No. 19/2000;
- Fees for Acquisition of Rights to Lands and Buildings ("Undang-undang Bea Perolehan Hak atas Tanah dan Bangunan/UU BPHTB"): Law No. 21/1997 amended by Law No. 20/2000
- Tax Dispute Settlement Agency Law (Undang-undang Badan Penyelesaian Sengketa Pajak): Law No. 21/1997, repealed by
  - Tax Court Law ("Undang-undang Pengadilan Pajak/UU PP"): Law No. 14/2002;
- General Provisions and Taxation Procedures Law (Indonesian: Undang-undang Ketentuan Umum dan Tatacara Perpajakan/UU KUP): Law No. 6/1983, amended I by Law No. 9/1994, amended II by Law No. 16/2000, amended IV by Law no.28/2007, partially amended by Law No. 7/2021;
- Excise Law ("Undang-undang Cukai"): Law No. 11/1995, amended by Law No. 39/2007, partially amended by Law No. 7/2021;
- Income Tax Law (Indonesian: Undang-undang Pajak Penghasilan/UU PPh): Law No. 7/1983, amended I by Law No. 7/1991, amended II by Law No. 10/1994, amended III by Law No. 17/2000; amended IV by Law No. 36/2008;
- Sales Tax Collection Law ("Undang-undang tentang Pemungutan Pajak Penjualan"): Emergency Law No. 19/1951, stipulated as a law by Law No. 35/1953, amended by Law No.2/1968, repealed by:
  - Value Added Tax termed 'Goods and Services and Sales Tax on Luxury Goods' Law ("Undang-undang Pajak Pertambahan Nilai atas Barang dan Jasa dan Pajak Penjualan atas Barang Mewah"/UU PPN and PPn BM): Law No. 8/1983, amended I by Law No. 11/1994, amended II by Law No. 18/2000, amended III by Law No. 42/2009, partially amended by Law No. 7/2021;
- Stamp Duty Law ("Undang-undang Bea Meterai/UU BM"): Law No. 13 of 1985, repealed by Law No. 10/2020
- Omnibus Law on Job Creation (Indonesian: Undang-undang Cipta Kerja / Undang-undang Omnibus): Law No. 11/2020;
- The Law on Harmonization of Tax Regulations Indonesia (Indonesian: Undang-undang Harmonisasi Peraturan Perpajakan / UU HPP): Law No. 7/2021;
- Regional Taxes and Regional Retributions Law ("Undang-undang Pajak Daerah dan Retribui Daerah"): Law No. 18/1997, amended by Law No. 34/2000, repealed by Law No. 28 of 2009, repealed by
  - Financial Relations between the Central Government and Local Governments Law ("Undang-undang Hubungan Keuangan antara Pemerintah Pusat dan Pemerintah Daerah"): Law No. 1/2022

== Definitions ==
Indonesian Taxation law provides the following definitions to clarify whom exactly is obligated to pay tax:

Individuals or statutory bodies which meet relevant criteria stipulated, including certain tax collectors or withholders.

Statutory bodies are defined by Indonesian Taxation Law as groups of persons and/or capital which constitutes a unit. These are more clearly defined as such entities undertaking or not undertaking businesses, covering limited liability companies, limited partnership companies, other companies, state or regional administration-owned companies in whatever names and forms, firms, joint companies, cooperatives, pension funds, partnerships, groups, foundations, mass organisations, social and political organisations or organisations of the same type, institutions, permanent establishments and other forms of statutory bodies.

Companies and entrepreneurs are defined in the context of Indonesian Taxation Law as those in their business activities or works/jobs produce goods, import goods, export goods, undertake trading businesses, utilize goods, provide or utilize services from regions outside the customs area.

Companies are subject to Value-Added Tax, pursuant to Law of 1984 and all amendments, excluding the few small-scale businesses whose criteria are stipulated by the Minister of Finance.

The Indonesian Tax Period is defined as one calendar month or other periods stipulated by a decision of the Minister of Finance at the maximum of 3 (three) calendar months (quarters). Tax Year shall be the period of 1 (one) calendar year unless taxpayers use accounting years different from the calendar year.

Indonesian Taxpayers must submit a Tax Return form which details and reports the calculation of tax payment owed by them. Tax Returns may cover a tax period or a tax year.

Tax Payments shall be letters used by taxpayers to pay or remit tax due to the state cash through Post Offices and/or state- or regional administration-owned banks or other payment point appointed by the Minister of Finance.

The penalties for Tax Evasion and Avoidance are very strict in Indonesia. For Underpaid-Tax, Additional Underpaid-Tax, Overpaid-Tax and Nil-Tax Assessments- which may be received by the debtor in the form of letters, warrants and administrative sanctions. Tax Credits for over-taxation or overpayment is withheld until the subsequent year- as payouts are not issued within the same financial year. Independent works/jobs shall be jobs executed by individuals having special expertise in a bid to earn income not bound by certain working relations.

Appeals against the Directorate General of Taxes may be arbitrated via the Court of Appeals at taxpayer expense.

== Taxation Rates ==
Indonesia has a series of progressive sliding rate taxes for all categories. Furthermore, as a developing nation, much economic activity is done at the 'cottage' level where sales and services taxation are tax exempt.

Indonesia's taxations system recognises the economic reality of the majority poorer citizens and the poor are exempt from almost any taxation. The underlying ethic of "gotong-royong"- "neighbourly [sic moral] help" is applied where the more fortunate wealthier are enforced to meet their moral obligation of a heavier burden of tax- regardless of arbitrary arguments to its fairness.

The tax-free poverty threshold for Indonesian income earners is also dependent on regions as there exists some disparity between the purchasing power of the Rupiah between regions and intra-regionally between larger urban cities and smaller ones. The Capital, Jakarta is considered the most expensive city in term of all goods, services and wages.

=== Personal Income Tax ===
Income taxation is subject to provincial (Provinsi) government regulations defined by the economic realities of that particular area. As mentioned above, the poorer denizens are exempt from almost all taxation.

| Band | Annual Income | Rate |
|---|---|---|
| Tax Free | Up to Rp54,000,000 | 0% |
| Band I | Up to Rp60,000,000 | 5% |
| Band II | Rp60,000,000 to Rp250,000,000 | 15% |
| Band III | Rp250,000,000 to Rp500,000,000 | 25% |
| Band IV | Rp500,000,000 to Rp5,000,000,000 | 30% |
| Band V | Above Rp5,000,000,000 | 35% |

Although rates are Regionally variable, for the sake of illustration income tax basically employs a progressive rate, commencing at 10% gross salary income per annum, sliding to 30% per annum. Regulations are being debated as of 2008 to include income from shares, dividends, trusts, and such related.

For example, the most urbanised and industrialised region, DKI Jakarta (Special Administrative Region of Greater Municipality of Jakarta), income taxation commences with salaries greater than one million Rupiah (IDR) per calendar month, at a rate of 10%, which slides progressively to 40%.

=== Corporation Tax ===
Companies in Indonesia are taxed at a rate of 22%, for both domestic and international sourced income. Resident Indonesian companies are required to withhold tax at a rate of 20% from payments to foreign companies.

==== Corporate Income Tax ====
A company is responsible to pay the obligations for the tax in the case the company’s home country is Indonesia. A foreign company that is operating in an establishment in Indonesia and performs different activities in Indonesia is obligated to pay the taxes that are put by Indonesia. In the case that the foreign company does not have an entity in Indonesia but makes income through different business activities in this country, then tax liability through withholding of the tax by the individual/company that pays the income is imposed. Normal rate of taxation in Indonesia corporate income is 22%. Companies that put a minimum of 40% of their shares to the public and are listed in the Indonesia Stock Exchange offer are taxed on 20%. Companies that have a gross turnover below 50 Billion (IDR) have a discount on 50% from the standard corporate income tax, in other words 12.5%. From the Finance Ministry regulations, companies with gross turnover under 4.8 Billion (IDR) is only 0.5% of the total revenue (in this case not on the profit) since July 2018 (to be paid monthly).

=== Property tax ===
Annual Property taxes In Indonesia, property taxes are imposed through progressive rates. In this logic; - Properties that have the value of 200 million rupiah have a property tax of 0.01%. -Properties that are valued between 200 million rupiah and 2 billion rupiah have a property tax of 0.10%. -Properties that are valued between 2 billion rupiah and 10 billion rupiah have a property tax of 0.20%. -Property that are valued more than 10 billion rupiah have a tax of 0.30%.

- A reduction of half of the property tax is made for non-profit activities, social and educational activities, health care services etc.

Tax on Rental Income The tax on rental income depends on the residence, the use of the space and other specifics. Rental income tax for non-residents in Indonesia is imposed in a flat rate of 20% of gross income. For income gained by companies, they are taxed by a flat rate of 25% of net income. The VAT is imposed in a flat rate of 10% on the gross rental income.

=== Value Added Taxation/Goods and Services Taxation ===
Per 1 January 2025, maximum Goods and Services Tax (GST) is levied at the rate of 12% at point of sale. Sales and services tax are exempt from cottage economies and industries.

A VAT rate of zero percent is applied to the following taxable events:

- export for taxable goods
- export for intangible taxable goods
- export for taxable services

VAT base on equivalent to the sale price/service fee or import/export value.

=== Land and Constructions Tax ===
Land Tax and Tax for the buildings constructed thereupon must be paid annually, or may be paid via arrangement in ten-year blocks by Indonesian land title deed-holders, pursuant to relevant criteria for exclusions. In general terms, this tax is applicable mainly to those of the middle classes and upwards. Land holding businesses must also pay this tax.″—

Land and Constructions thereupon are calculated at a value calculated by the Regional government- which is less than real market worth. This calculated value has the caveat of being a legally non-negotiable purchase price if the Government wishes to procure said land. In Jakarta, land tax is 10% of Government calculated value.

Non-Indonesians may not legally own land but may arrange long-term assured leases from the Indonesian Central Government. As such, Foreign Nationals may not subject to the Land Tax obligation of Indonesians. Exemptions from Land Tax exist for poorer society. Land Tax calculations are considered a highly specialised skill- most especially as the punishments and sanctions for false reportage are very severe and indeed costly.

=== Vehicles ===
Passenger Vehicle Tax is required to be paid by all owners, the rationale being those fortunate enough to afford a motor vehicle can afford to subsidise their poorer brethren who rely on far less luxurious public transportation. Again, Regional Government legislates the specific definitions regarding this tax.

For the city of Jakarta, the city with the greatest vehicle ownership, most congested city, 1% of current vehicle real agreed market is due annually. Furthermore- passenger vehicles with an engine capacity greater than 4 cylinders are taxed again and as are those mass greater than 1500 kilogrammes (commonly four-wheel drives and SUV's).

Transportation and logistics vehicles, trucks/lorries, buses, vans and utility pick-ups are taxed according to axle number, vehicle mass and maximum safe gross loaded weight. Maximum loaded weight inspections are frequent and random and joked colloquially as the Police's cash-cow.

Petroleum is taxed at a rate of approximately 25% – though remains cheaper than neighbouring developed nations such as Australia or Singapore.

=== Carbon Tax ===
Carbon tax is a new tax come into effect in Indonesia starting July 1st 2022 as part of Indonesia’s tax reform. As one of the non-trade fiscal instrument, the carbon tax is aimed to change behaviour, supporting emission decrease and encourage investment and innovation. According to Law No.7/2021 about The Law on Harmonization of Tax Regulations in Indonesia, Carbon tax is imposed on carbon emission that give negative impact to environment. The direction of imposition of carbon tax is in regard of carbon market roadmap and/or carbon tax roadmap which include carbon emission reduction strategy, priority sector target, renewable energy development and harmonization of various other regulation. Carbon tax is imposed with the principle of just and affordable, based on global and national business climate. Carbon tax in Indonesia is set at higher or at the same price of carbon price in carbon market with lowest price of Rp30,00 (0.21 cent dollar at May 2022) per Kilogram Carbon Diokside equivalent (CO2e). The first sector in July 2022 to be charged with carbon tax in Indonesia is coal steam power plant.
