= Commodity Futures Trading Regulatory Agency =

Indonesia government agency

- Badan Pengawas Perdagangan Berjangka Komoditi

Agency overview
- Formed: 1997
- Preceding agency: Executing Agency of the Commodity Exchange
- Headquarters: Gedung Utama Lantai 4 Kementerian Perdagangan Jl. M.I. Ridwan Rais No. 5 Jakarta 10110
- Annual budget: Rp 47.9 billion (2022)
- Agency executive: Tirta Karma Senjaya, Head
- Parent agency: Ministry of Trade
- Website: bappebti.go.id

The Commodity Futures Trading Regulatory Agency (CoFTRA; Badan Pengawas Perdagangan Berjangka Komoditi or Bappebti in Indonesian) is a commodity futures regulating agency in Indonesia, operating as a part of the Ministry of Trade.

== Background ==
Its role is stipulated by the Law Number 32 of 1997 as amended by Law Number 10 of 2011 concerning Commodities Futures Trading.

Bappebti is authorized to license, regulate, and supervise commodity clearing houses and trading platforms and to set margin requirements for the OTC commodity derivatives market participants.

== Cryptocurrency ==
On January 10, 2025, the regulatory authority over cryptocurrencies and their derivatives was transferred from Bappebti to the Financial Services Authority (Otoritas Jasa Keuangan or OJK).
