= Budi Santoso (politician) =

Indonesian politician (born 1968)

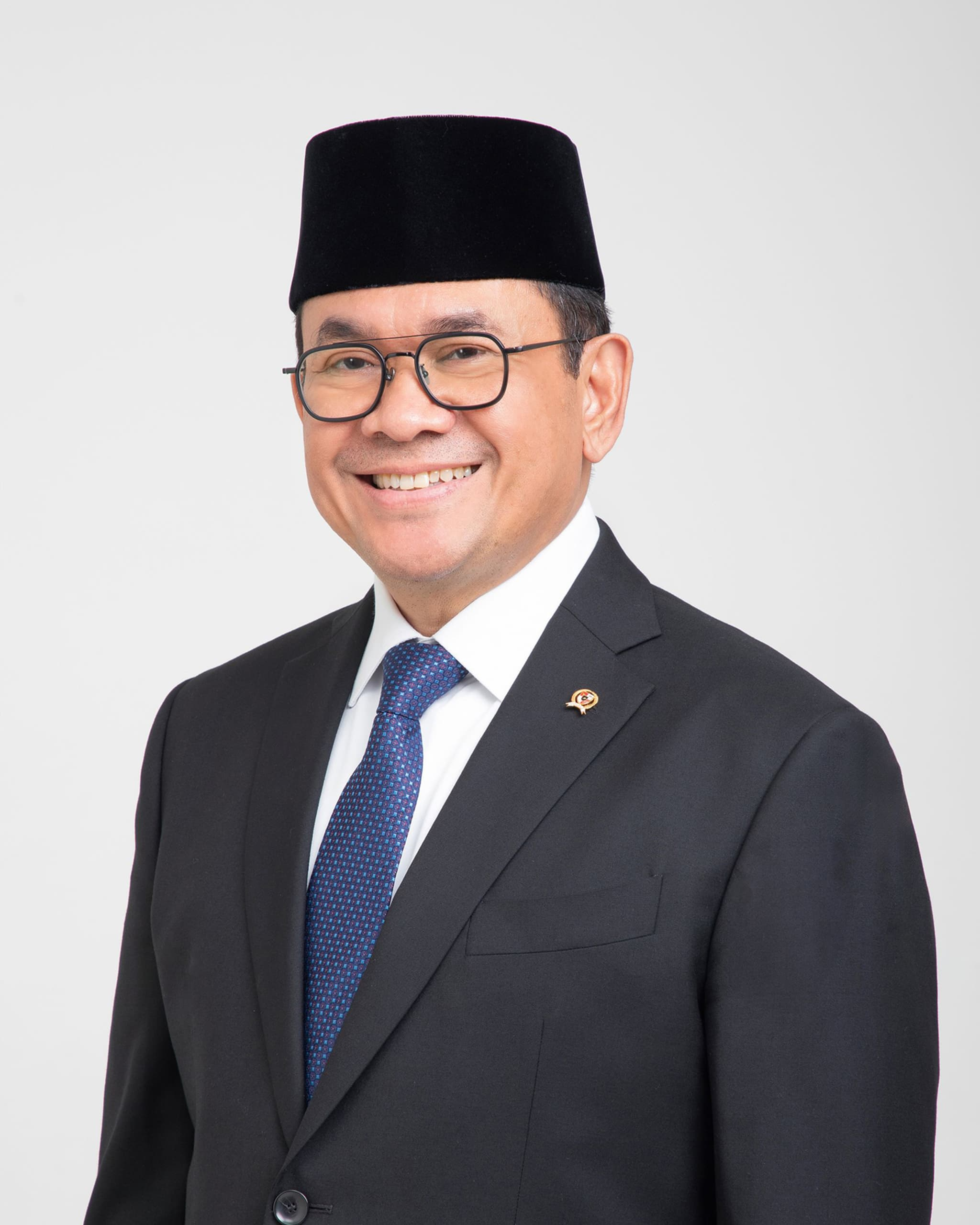

34th Minister of Trade
- Incumbent
- Assumed office 21 October 2024
- President: Prabowo Subianto
- Deputy: Dyah Roro Esti
- Preceded by: Zulkifli Hasan

Personal details
- Born: 9 February 1968 (age 58) Sukoharjo, Central Java
- Party: PAN (since 2024)
- Other political affiliations: Independent
- Spouse: Danty Budi Santoso

Budi Santoso (born 9 February 1968) is an Indonesian politician serving as minister of trade since 2024. From 2022 to 2024, he served as director general of foreign trade.
