= Satya Widya Yudha =

Indonesian politician

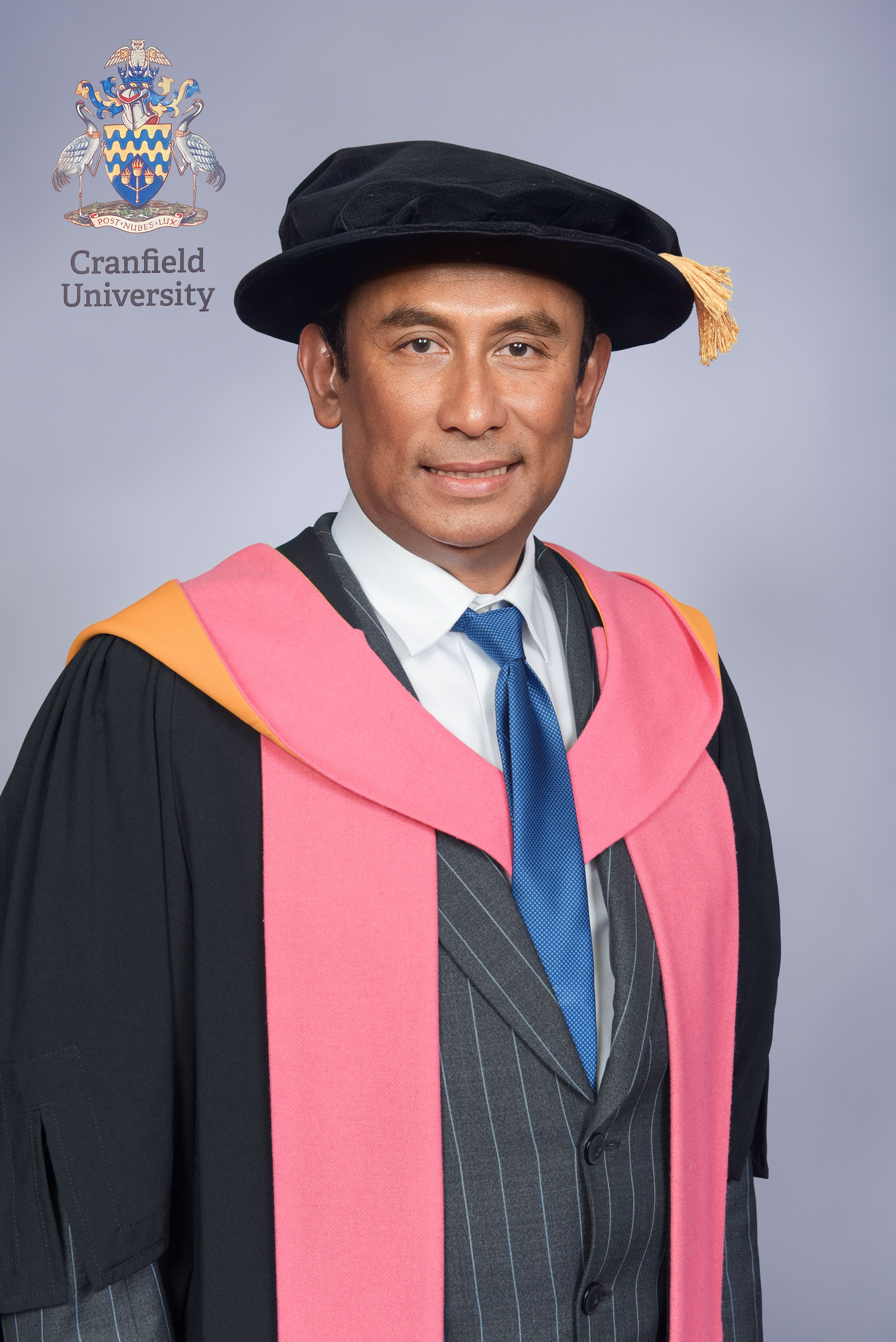
- Portrait of Satya Widya Yudha

Member of the National Energy Council of the Republic of Indonesia
- Incumbent
- Assumed office 8 January 2021

Deputy Chairman of Commission I of the People's Representative Council of the Republic of Indonesia
- In office 4 April 2018 – 30 September 2019
- Preceded by: Meutya Hafid
- Succeeded by: Meutya Hafid

Deputy Chairman of Commission VII of the People's Representative Council of the Republic of Indonesia
- In office 1 October 2014 – 4 April 2018
- Preceded by: Zainudin Amali
- Succeeded by: Eni Saragih

Deputy General Treasurer Coordinator for the Economy, Golkar Party Central Executive Council
- In office 2018–2019

Head of Energy and Natural Resources, Golkar Party Central Executive Council
- In office 2014–2016

Deputy of General Secretary, Golkar Party Central Executive Council
- In office 2014–2016

Personal details
- Born: Satya Widya Yudha; 10 November 1961 (age 64) Kediri, East Java
- Party: Golkar
- Spouse: Diah Ambarsari
- Children: Dyah Roro Esti Widya Putri, Satya Hangga Yudha Widya Putra
- Education: Institut Teknologi Sepuluh Nopember (Ir.); Cranfield University (MSc, PhD)
- Website: www.satyayudha.com

Satya Widya Yudha (SWY) is a member of the National Energy Council of the Republic of Indonesia (DEN-RI) for the period of 2020-2025, after being proposed and appointed by the President of the Republic of Indonesia with the approval of the Indonesian Parliament.

From October 2014 to February 2018 he served as Vice Chairman of Commission VII of the House of Representatives of the Republic of Indonesia—overseeing energy, mineral resources, environment, forestry, research and technology. He served as Vice Chairman of Commission I overseeing defense, foreign affairs, communication, informatics and intelligence from March 2018 to September 2019. He is also the chairman of the Green Economy and Alternative Energy Caucus (GEC) of the House of Representatives, as well as the Indonesia-India Bilateral Cooperation Group of the House of Representatives.

Satya Widya Yudha served as a member of the House of Representatives for the period of 2009–2014, representing the Golkar party and the East Java IX constituency, which comprises the regencies of Tuban and Bojonegoro. Within Golkar, Satya Widya Yudha once served as Vice Secretary-General of the Central Executive Board for Energy and Natural Resources, as well as Head of Natural Resources in the party's daily executive board. He was once Vice Treasurer of the Golkar Party’s Central Executive Board.

== Early life and family ==
SWY was born in Kediri City, East Java Province on November 10, 1961. SWY is married to Diah Ambarsari and had two children, namely Dyah Roro Esti Widya Putri. Diah Ambarsari had completed her Masters education at Imperial College London, and graduated in 2017. Satya Hangga Yudha Widya Putra, has completed his Masters education at New York University (NYU) and graduated in 2017. Yudha currently resides in Pondok Indah, South Jakarta, Jakarta, Indonesia with his wife.

== Education ==
SWY holds a Bachelor of marine engineering (S1) from the Institut Teknologi Sepuluh Nopember (ITS), Surabaya and Masters (MSc) in Oil & Gas Project Quality Management from Cranfield University School of Industrial and Manufacturing Science in Bedford, United Kingdom; he also received his PhD degree in Energy & Power from Cranfield University School of Water, Energy and Environment in Bedford, United Kingdom,

== Business career ==
In the oil and gas field, he once served as Director of Federal Relations and Business Development for the ARCO, and later for BP in Washington, D.C., United States when BP acquired ARCO. He was later entrusted to serve as Director of International Affairs of BP, based in London. He then returned to Indonesia to serve for two and a half years as Vice President of BP Indonesia. He later served as LNG Supply and Development Director of BP China in Beijing. In China, Yudha then continued his career at BP Vietnam as Business Strategy Director. His last professional stint was as BP representative at VICO Indonesia as Director of Business Development of Coalbed Methane (CBM), before finally starting his political career in parliament until the end of 2019 and being in the Government as a Member of the National Energy Council.

== Political career ==
SWY served as a member of the People's Representative Council (DPR RI) for the period 2009-2014 representing the Golkar Party in the electoral district of East Java IX (Tuban Regency and Bojonegoro Regency). In the 2014 Legislative Election, SWY was re-elected from the same electoral district for the 2014-2019 period. He served as Deputy Chairman of Commission VII DPR RI from 2014-2018, in charge of Energy and Mineral Resources, Research and Technology, and the Environment. In April 2018, SWY received a new assignment as Deputy Chair of Commission I of the DPR until September 30, 2019, which oversees issues in the Defense, Foreign Affairs, Communication and Information and Intelligence sectors.

During his time in the House of Representatives, Yudha was once appointed Head of the Indonesian Parliamentary Delegation in 2011 for the Parliamentary Conference on the WTO. He also served as Vice Head of the Special Committee for the Review of the Law on Geothermal, Head of the Delegation of the Special Committee for the Review of the Law on Geothermal to New Zealand, member of the Special Committee for the Law on Engineering, Working Committee for the Geospatial Information Bill, Working Committee for Oil and Gas, Working Committee for Mineral and Coal, Working Committee for the Ratification of the HAZE Agreement, Working Committee for the Ratification of the Nagoya Protocol, and many more.

During the current 2014–2019 period, Satya Widya Yudha was mandated to be the Vice Chairman of Commission VII of the House of Representatives, before being replaced by Fadel Muhammad. He is also the architect and chairman of the Green Economy and Alternative Energy Caucus of the House of Representatives.

In his political career at Golkar, Yudha once served as Vice Secretary-General of the Central Executive Board for Energy and Natural Resources, as well as serving in the daily executive board as Head of Natural Resources. He is currently Vice Treasurer of the party’s Central Executive Committee.

Yudha also currently serves as Head of the Alumni Expert Board of his old campus, Institut Teknologi Sepuluh Nopember, for the period of 2015–2019. He was also appointed by his colleagues to be the Chairman of the Indonesian Chapter of the Cranfield University Alumni.

== Energy activism ==
Yudha has expertise in geopolitics and energy economics with a special focus on Indonesia, China and Vietnam. In his work, Yudha specializes in energy security, energy subsidies, strategic bilateral relations in energy, and risk assessments of national investments. For this, the National Resilience Institute (Lembaga Ketahanan Nasional) has requested his presence to be a speaker. Most recently, in early August 2016, Yudha was invited to be a speaker at a public discussion with the theme "Realizing Energy Sovereignty in order to Increase Public Welfare in the Context of National Resilience".

Yudha spoke on Fiscal and Contract Terms at a conference of the Natural Resources Governance Institute hosted by St. Catherine's College, Oxford University in 2015. Yudha also spoke at the United Nations Sustainable Stock Exchanges (SSE) Leaders Luncheon on Climate, which was part of the United Nations Climate Change Conference (COP21) in Paris, late 2015.

Yudha was requested to be a responder during the launching of the Indonesia Energy Outlook, together with Executive Director of the International Energy Agency (IEA), Dr. Fatih Birol in July 2016.

== Award ==
In 2013, along with Joko Widodo (then-Governor of DKI Jakarta), Sharif Cicip Sutardjo (then-Minister of Maritime Affairs and Fisheries), Yusril Ihza Mahendra (previously Minister of State Secretariat), Roy Suryo (then-Minister of Youth and Sports Affairs), and conglomerate Hary Tanoesoedibjo, Yudha received the ‘Right Man On The Right Place’ award in the category of Committed Achievement from Lensa Indonesia.
