= Directorate General of Customs and Excise =

Indonesian government customs agency

Directorate General of Customs and Excise Direktorat Jenderal Bea dan Cukai
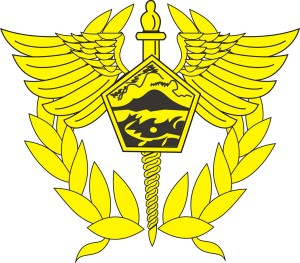
- Common name: Bea Cukai
- Abbreviation: DJBC

Agency overview
- Formed: 1 October 1946
- Preceding agency: De Dienst der Invoer en Uitvoerrechten en Accijnzen
- Employees: 15,935

Jurisdictional structure
- National agency (Operations jurisdiction): Indonesia
- Operations jurisdiction: Indonesia
- Legal jurisdiction: National
- Governing body: Government of Indonesia
- Constituting instrument: Undang-Undang Nomor 11 Tahun 1995

Operational structure
- Headquarters: Jalan Ahmad Yani By Pass, Jakarta, Indonesia
- Elected officer responsible: Purbaya Yudhi Sadewa, Minister of Finance
- Agency executive: Djaka Budhi Utama, Director General
- Parent agency: Ministry of Finance

Website
- beacukai.go.id

The Directorate General of Customs and Excise (Indonesian: Direktorat Jenderal Bea dan Cukai abbreviated Bea Cukai or DJBC) is an Indonesian government agency under Ministry of Finance that serves the community in the field of customs and excise.

== History ==
=== Dutch colonial era ===
The establishment of official customs and excise administration in Indonesia began during the colonialization period of the Netherlands, specifically upon the entry of VOC to the country.

The officers were often called ‘douane’, while the official name of the administration was (De Dienst der Invoer en Uitvoerrechten en Accijnzen (I.U & A)), loosely translated as the Department of Import Duty and Export Duty and Excise.

The administration's main objectives were to collectinvoer-rechten (import duty), uitvoer-rechten (export duty), andaccijnzen (excise).

This Bureau is headed by a Chief Inspector who doubles as an advisor to the Director of Finance for trade and shipping domiciled in Batavia. At that time the Customs Bureau was headed by a civilian officer appointed directly from the Netherlands.

Several Heads of the Customs and Excise Office of the Netherlands Indies period were as follows:

Head	Era
G.F. De Bruyn Kops	1933
S.M. Van Der Zee	1939
K.H. Dronkers	1946
G.Van Der Pol	1949

The history of the first duty and excise tax collections in Indonesia began in the Dutch colonial era in 1886 against kerosene based on the Ordonnantie van December 27, 1886, Stbl. 1886 Number 249. issued by the government of the Dutch East Indies.

=== Japanese colonial era ===
During the colonialization period of Japan, the Japanese Occupation Army passed Law no. 13 on the opening of government offices in Java and Madura. In article 1, paragraph 2 of the law states:

"Customs and excise duty offices in regions and branches shall not be taken care of temporarily".

The department's functions of collecting import duty and export duty were eliminated, leaving only the function of collecting excise.

The Customs and Excise, Tax Branch was made into an institution with the joint name Gunseikanbu Zaimubu Shuzeika led by Chogo assisted by several native employees, namely Soetikno Slamet and H.A. Pandelaki.

=== Post-independence ===
Shortly after Indonesia proclaimed independence, the organization of the Ministry of Finance was formed and the Customs and Excise was established to be part of the Tax Office.

On 1 October 1946, Sjafruddin Prawiranegara, minister of finance at the time, decide to overhaul organizational structure of the Ministry of Finance.

Customs and Excise is released from the Tax Office and becomes standalone office as the Customs and Excise Office and appoints Mr. R.A. Kartadjoemena as Chief of Customs and Excise Officer.

That date is considered as the date of birth of the Directorate General of Customs and Excise.

== Duties ==
The Directorate General of Customs and Excise is divided into several branches in different regions across Indonesia.

The directorate reports directly to the Ministry of Finance.

=== Main task ===
To carry out the main task of Ministry of Finance in the field of customs and excise, based on the policy determined by Minister, and secure government policy related with the traffic of goods entering and leaving Customs Territory and Customs and Excise levies as well as other state levies based on the prevailing government regulations and laws.

=== Purpose ===
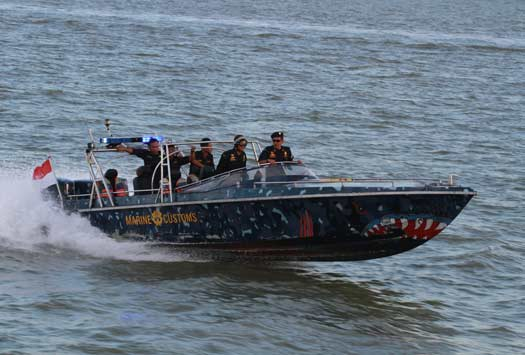
A patrol boat belonging to the Custom and Excise during a patrol

To carry out the main task, Directorate General of Customs and Excise has the function of:

- Formulating the technical policy in the field of customs and excise, in accordance with the policy determined by Minister and the prevailing government regulations and laws.
- Planning, implementing, controlling, evaluating, and securing technical operation of government policy which related with the control of traffic of goods entering and leaving customs territory, in accordance with the policy determined by Minister and based on the prevailing government regulations and laws.
- Planning, implementing, controlling, evaluating and securing technical operation in the field of import duty and excise levy also other levies which are under the responsibility of Directorate General based on the prevailing government regulations and laws.
- Planning, developing and counseling in services, permits, facilities, procedures and supervision in the field of customs and excise based on the prevailing government regulations and laws.
- Prevention on breach of government regulations and laws of customs and excise and enforcement in the field of customs and excise and also investigation of criminal act of customs and excise in accordance with the prevailing government regulations and laws.

=== Vision and Mission ===
The vision of the DJBC's is to be "the leading customs and excise institution globally" and has three missions:

- To facilitate trade and industry
- To protect the border and the community from smuggling and illegal trade
- To optimize state revenue in the field of customs and excise

=== Other functions ===
Since DJBC is the agency that regulates the entry of goods in the territory of Indonesia, DJBC's duty is also to enforce export and import regulations issued by other ministries or government agencies, such as:

1. Ministry of Trade
2. Fish Quarantine and Inspection Agency
3. Animal Quarantine of Indonesian Agricultural Quarantine Agency (IAQA)
4. Plant Quarantine of Indonesian Agricultural Quarantine Agency (IAQA)
5. National Agency of Drug and Food Control
6. Ministry of Health
7. Nuclear Energy Regulatory Agency
8. Bank Indonesia
9. Ministry of Environment and Forestry
10. Directorate General of Resource and Equipment Post and Informatics
11. Ministry of Agriculture
12. Ministry of Industry
13. Indonesian National Police
14. Ministry of Energy and Mineral Resources
15. Directorate General of Taxes

== Organisation ==
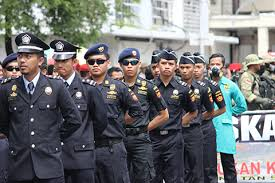
Personnel of the Customs and Excise during a parade

The organisation structure of Directorate General of Customs and Excise comprises the following components:

- Directorate General of Customs and Excise, position held by Director General
- Secretariat General of Customs and Excise
  - Department of Organization and Governance
  - Department of Finance
  - Department of Personnel Administration
  - Department of Government-owned Goods
  - Department of Personnel Development
  - Department of General Affairs
- Directorate of Customs Affairs
  - Sub-directorate of Import
  - Sub-directorate of Export
  - Sub-directorate of Goods Classification
  - Sub-directorate of Customs valuation
  - Sub-directorate of Registration
  - Sub-directorate of Priority Program and Authorized Economic Operator
- Directorate of Customs Facility
  - Sub-directorate of Tariff Exemption
  - Sub-directorate of Mining Affairs
  - Sub-directorate of Importation for Export Purpose
  - Sub-directorate of Free Trade Zone
  - Sub-directorate of Special Zone
- Directorate of Excise Affairs and Facility
  - Sub-directorate of Excise Tariff
  - Sub-directorate of Excise Permit and Facility
  - Sub-directorate of Excise Payment and Refund
  - Sub-directorate of Free Trade Zone
  - Sub-directorate of Excise Potency and Compliance of Excise-able Entrepreneurs
- Directorate of Customs and Excise International Cooperation
  - Sub-directorate of Multilateral
  - Sub-directorate of Bilateral
  - Sub-directorate of Regional
- Directorate of Appeals Objection and Regulatory
  - Sub-directorate of Objection
  - Sub-directorate of Appeals
  - Sub-directorate of Legal Efforts
  - Sub-directorate of Regulatory
- Directorate of Customs and Excise Information and Technology
  - Sub-directorate of Information System Strategy and Planning
  - Sub-directorate of Information System Development
  - Sub-directorate of Information System Quality Control
  - Sub-directorate of Information Security Control, Services Management and Evaluation
  - Sub-directorate of Data Management and Services
- Directorate of Internal Compliance
  - Sub-directorate of Prevention
  - Sub-directorate of Compliance Supervision and Internal Investigation
  - Sub-directorate of Quality Assurance
  - Sub-directorate of Performance Management
- Directorate of Customs and Excise Audit
  - Sub-directorate of Audit Planning
  - Sub-directorate of Audit Execution I
  - Sub-directorate of Audit Execution II
  - Sub-directorate of Monitoring, Evaluation, and Audit Quality Assurance
- Directorate of Enforcement and Investigation
  - Sub-directorate of Intelligence
  - Sub-directorate of Enforcement
  - Sub-directorate of Investigation
  - Sub-directorate of Operation Infrastructure
  - Sub-directorate of Marine Patrol
  - Sub-directorate Transnational Organized Crime
- Directorate of Revenue and Strategic Planning
  - Sub-directorate of Revenue
  - Sub-directorate of Strategic Planning and Transformation Management
  - Sub-directorate of Risk Management
- Directorate of Narcotics Interdiction
  - Sub-directorate of Narcotics Analysis and Targeting
  - Sub-directorate of Operation and Narcotics Network Revelation
  - Sub-directorate of Narcotics Operation Support
- Directorate of Communication and Stakeholder Counseling
  - Sub-directorate of Communication Strategy, Monitoring and Evaluation
  - Sub-directorate of Public Relation and Socialization
  - Sub-directorate of Publication
  - Sub-directorate of Counseling and Information Services
- Primary Service Office (Kantor Pelayanan Utama)
  - Kantor Pelayanan Utama Bea dan Cukai Tipe A Tanjung Priok
  - Kantor Pelayanan Utama Bea dan Cukai Tipe B Batam
  - Kantor Pelayanan Utama Bea dan Cukai Tipe C Soekarno-Hatta
- Customs and Excise Regional Office (Kantor Wilayah DJBC)
  - Kantor Wilayah DJBC Aceh di Banda Aceh
    - KPPBC Tipe Madya Pabean C Banda Aceh di Banda Aceh
    - KPPBC Tipe Madya Pabean C Sabang di Sabang
    - KPPBC Tipe Madya Pabean C Lhokseumawe di Lhokseumawe
    - KPPBC Tipe Madya Pabean C Meulaboh di Meulaboh
    - KPPBC Tipe Madya Pabean C Langsa di Langsa
  - Kantor Wilayah DJBC Sumatera Utara di Medan
    - KPPBC Tipe Madya Pabean Belawan di Belawan
    - KPPBC Tipe Madya Pabean B Medan di Medan
    - KPPBC Tipe Madya Pabean C Teluk Nibung di Tanjung Balai
    - KPPBC Tipe Madya Pabean B Kuala Namu di Deli Serdang
    - KPPBC Tipe Madya Pabean C Pematangsiantar di Pematangsiantar
    - KPPBC Tipe Madya Pabean C Sibolga di Sibolga
    - KPPBC Tipe Madya Pabean C Kuala Tanjung di Batubara
  - Kantor Wilayah DJBC Riau di Pekanbaru
    - KPPBC Tipe Madya Pabean B Pekanbaru di Pekanbaru
    - KPPBC Tipe Madya Pabean B Dumai di Dumai
    - KPPBC Tipe Madya Pabean C Bengkalis di Bengkalis
    - KPPBC Tipe Madya Pabean C Tembilahan di Tembilahan
    - KPPBC Tipe Madya Pabean B Teluk Bayur di Teluk Bayur
  - Kantor Wilayah DJBC Khusus Kepulauan Riau di Tanjung Balai Karimun
    - KPPBC Tipe Madya Pabean B Tanjung Balai Karimun di Tanjung Balai Karimun
    - KPPBC Tipe Madya Pabean B Tanjung Pinang di Tanjung Pinang
  - Kantor Wilayah DJBC Sumatera Bagian Timur di Palembang
    - KPPBC Tipe Madya Pabean B Palembang di Palembang
    - KPPBC Tipe Madya Pabean B Jambi di Jambi
    - KPPBC Tipe Madya Pabean C Pangkal Pinang di Pangkal Pinang
    - KPPBC Tipe Madya Pabean C Tanjungpandan di Tanjungpandan
  - Kantor Wilayah DJBC Sumatera Bagian Barat di Bandar Lampung
    - KPPBC Tipe Madya Pabean B Bandar Lampung di Bandar Lampung
    - KPPBC Tipe Madya Pabean C Bengkulu di Bengkulu
  - Kantor Wilayah DJBC Banten di Tangerang
    - KPPBC Tipe Madya Pabean Merak di Cilegon
    - KPPBC Tipe Madya Pabean A Tangerang di Tangerang Selatan
  - Kantor Wilayah DJBC Jakarta di Jakarta Pusat
    - KPPBC Tipe Madya Pabean A Jakarta di Jakarta
    - KPPBC Tipe Madya Pabean A Marunda di Jakarta
    - KPPBC Tipe Madya Pabean C Kantor Pos Pasar Baru di Jakarta
    - KPPBC Tipe Madya Pabean A Bekasi di Bekasi
    - KPPBC Tipe Madya Pabean Cikarang di Cikarang
  - Kantor Wilayah DJBC Jawa Barat di Bandung
    - KPPBC Tipe Madya Pabean A Bogor di Bogor
    - KPPBC Tipe Madya Pabean A Purwakarta di Purwakarta
    - KPPBC Tipe Madya Pabean A Bandung di Bandung
    - KPPBC Tipe Madya Pabean C Cirebon di Cirebon
    - KPPBC Tipe Madya Pabean C Tasikmalaya di Tasikmalaya
  - Kantor Wilayah DJBC Jawa Tengah Dan D.I. Yogyakarta di Semarang
    - KPPBC Tipe Madya Pabean Tanjung Emas di Semarang
    - KPPBC Tipe Madya Cukai Kudus di Kudus
    - KPPBC Tipe Madya Pabean B Surakarta di Surakarta
    - KPPBC Tipe Madya Pabean C Cilacap di Cilacap
    - KPPBC Tipe Madya Pabean A Semarang di Semarang
    - KPPBC Tipe Madya Pabean B Yogyakarta di Yogyakarta
    - KPPBC Tipe Madya Pabean C Purwokerto di Purwokerto
    - KPPBC Tipe Madya Pabean C Tegal di Tegal
    - KPPBC Tipe Madya Pabean C Magelang di Magelang
  - Kantor Wilayah DJBC Jawa Timur I di Surabaya
    - KPPBC Tipe Madya Pabean Tanjung Perak di Surabaya
    - KPPBC Tipe Madya Pabean A Pasuruan di Pasuruan
    - KPPBC Tipe Madya Pabean Juanda di Surabaya
    - KPPBC Tipe Madya Pabean B Gresik di Gresik
    - KPPBC Tipe Madya Pabean B Sidoarjo di Sidoarjo
    - KPPBC Tipe Madya Pabean C Madura di Madura
    - KPPBC Tipe Madya Pabean C Bojonegoro di Bojonegoro
  - Kantor Wilayah DJBC Jawa Timur II di Malang
    - KPPBC Tipe Madya Cukai Malang di Malang
    - KPPBC Tipe Madya Cukai Kediri di Kediri
    - KPPBC Tipe Madya Pabean C Blitar di Blitar
    - KPPBC Tipe Madya Pabean C Madiun di Madiun
    - KPPBC Tipe Madya Pabean C Jember di Jember
    - KPPBC Tipe Madya Pabean C Banyuwangi di Banyuwangi
    - KPPBC Tipe Madya Pabean C Probolinggo di Probolinggo
  - Kantor Wilayah DJBC Bali, NTB Dan NTT di Denpasar
    - KPPBC Tipe Madya Pabean Ngurah Rai di Denpasar
    - KPPBC Tipe Madya Pabean A Denpasar di Denpasar
    - KPPBC Tipe Madya Pabean C Mataram di Mataram
    - KPPBC Tipe Madya Pabean C Kupang di Kupang
    - KPPBC Tipe Madya Pabean B Atambua di Atambua
    - KPPBC Tipe Madya Pabean C Sumbawa di Sumbawa
    - KPPBC Tipe Madya Pabean C Labuan Bajo di Labuan Bajo
  - Kantor Wilayah DJBC Kalimantan Bagian Barat di Pontianak
    - KPPBC Tipe Madya Pabean B Pontianak di Pontianak
    - KPPBC Tipe Madya Pabean C Entikong di Entikong
    - KPPBC Tipe Madya Pabean C Sintete di Sambas
    - KPPBC Tipe Madya Pabean C Nanga Badau di Kapuas Hulu
    - KPPBC Tipe Madya Pabean C Ketapang di Ketapang
    - KPPBC Tipe Madya Pabean C Jagoi Babang di Bengkayang
  - Kantor Wilayah DJBC Kalimantan Bagian Selatan di Banjarmasin
    - KPPBC Tipe Madya Pabean B Banjarmasin di Banjarmasin
    - KPPBC Tipe Madya Pabean C Sampit di Sampit
    - KPPBC Tipe Madya Pabean C Pangkalan Bun di Pangkalan Bun
    - KPPBC Tipe Madya Pabean C Kotabaru di Kotabaru
    - KPPBC Tipe Madya Pabean C Palangkaraya di Palangkaraya
  - Kantor Wilayah DJBC Kalimantan Bagian Timur di Balikpapan
    - KPPBC Tipe Madya Pabean B Balikpapan di Balikpapan
    - KPPBC Tipe Madya Pabean B Samarinda di Samarinda
    - KPPBC Tipe Madya Pabean C Bontang di Bontang
    - KPPBC Tipe Madya Pabean B Tarakan di Tarakan
    - KPPBC Tipe Madya Pabean C Nunukan di Nunukan
    - KPPBC Tipe Madya Pabean C Sangatta di Sangatta
  - Kantor Wilayah DJBC Sulawesi Bagian Selatan di Makassar
    - KPPBC Tipe Madya Pabean B Makassar di Makassar
    - KPPBC Tipe Madya Pabean C Parepare di Parepare
    - KPPBC Tipe Madya Pabean C Malili di Luwu
    - KPPBC Tipe Madya Pabean C Kendari di Kendari
  - Kantor Wilayah DJBC Sulawesi Bagian Utara di Manado
    - KPPBC Tipe Madya Pabean C Pantoloan di Palu
    - KPPBC Tipe Madya Pabean C Morowali di Morowali
    - KPPBC Tipe Madya Pabean C Luwuk di Luwuk
    - KPPBC Tipe Madya Pabean C Bitung di Bitung
    - KPPBC Tipe Madya Pabean C Manado di Manado
    - KPPBC Tipe Madya Pabean C Gorontalo di Gorontalo
  - Kantor Wilayah DJBC Maluku di Ambon
    - KPPBC Tipe Madya Pabean C Ambon di Ambon
    - KPPBC Tipe Madya Pabean C Tual di Tual
    - KPPBC Tipe Madya Pabean C Ternate di Ternate
  - Kantor Wilayah DJBC Khusus Papua di Sorong
    - KPPBC Tipe Madya Pabean C Sorong di Sorong
    - KPPBC Tipe Madya Pabean C Manokwari di Manokwari
    - KPPBC Tipe Madya Pabean C Jayapura di Jayapura
    - KPPBC Tipe Madya Pabean C Biak di Biak
    - KPPBC Tipe Madya Pabean C Merauke di Merauke
    - KPPBC Tipe Madya Pabean C Fakfak di Fakfak
    - KPPBC Tipe Madya Pabean C Timika di Timika
- Customs and Excise Laboratory
  - Balai Laboratorium Bea dan Cukai di Jakarta
  - Balai Laboratorium Bea dan Cukai di Surabaya
  - Balai Laboratorium Bea dan Cukai di Medan
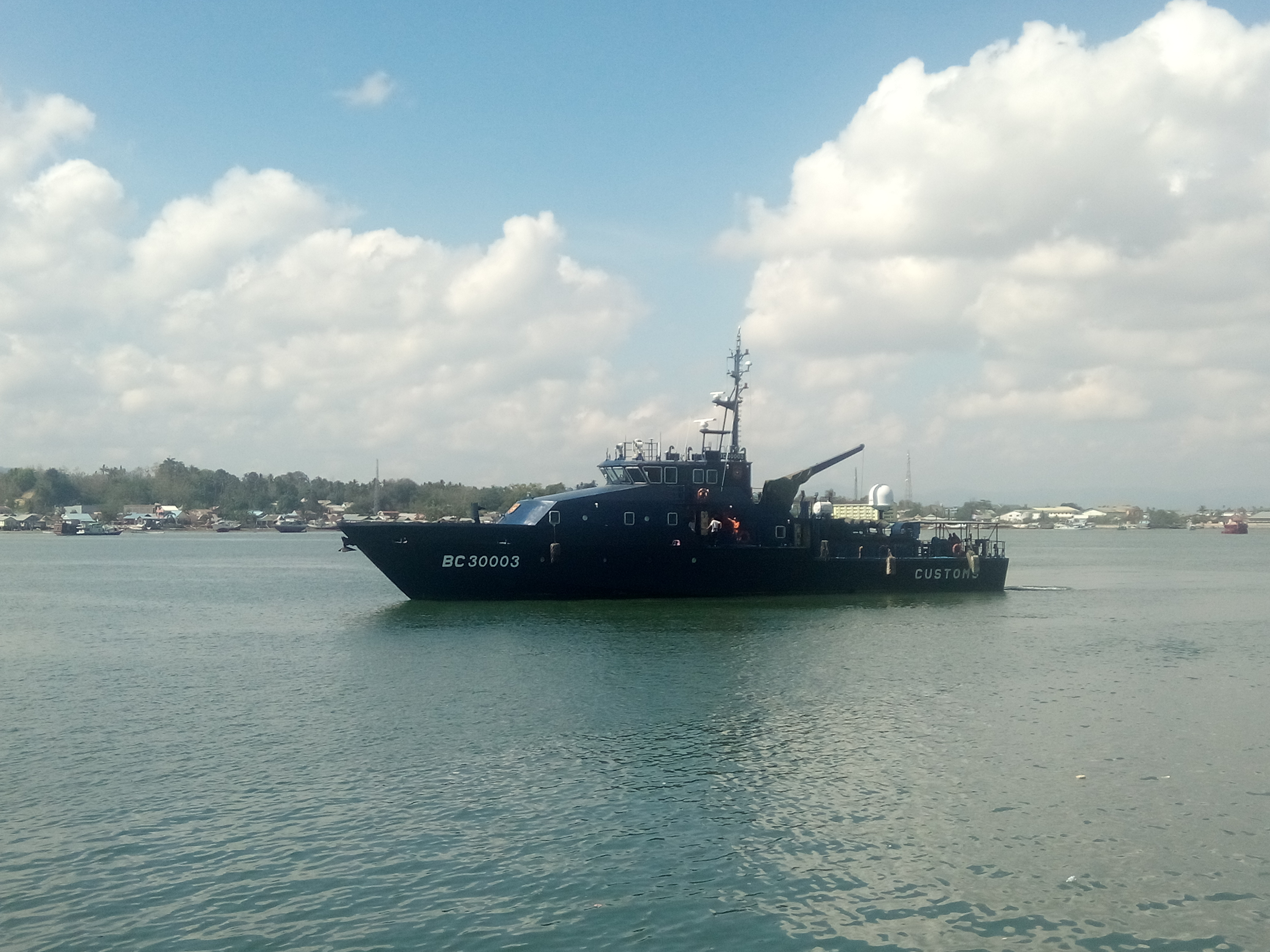
    Indonesia Customs and Excise 38m-class Fast Patrol Boat (hull number BC30003), made by PT. PAL
- Customs and Excise Forward Operating Base
  - Pangkalan Sarana Operasi Bea dan Cukai Tipe A Tanjung Balai Karimun
  - Pangkalan Sarana Operasi Bea dan Cukai Tipe B Tanjung Priok
  - Pangkalan Sarana Operasi Bea dan Cukai Tipe B Pantoloan
  - Pangkalan Sarana Operasi Bea dan Cukai Tipe B Batam
  - Pangkalan Sarana Operasi Bea dan Cukai Tipe B Sorong

== Logo of Directorate General of Customs and Excise ==
=== Design ===
- A pentagon with the image of sea, mountain, and sky inside it;
- A staff with 8 spiral at the under-part;
- Wings consisting of 30 small-sized feathers and 10 large-sized feathers;
- Rice tassel in amount of 24 forming a circle.

=== Meaning ===
- Pentagon represents Pancasila as the foundation of the Republic of Indonesia;
- Sea, mountain and sky represent the jurisdiction of the Customs Law and Excise Law.
- Staff represents international trade of the Republic of Indonesia from/to 8 directions of wind
- Wings represent the Finance Day of the Republic of Indonesia on 30 October and represent the Directorate General of Customs and Excise as part of the Ministry of Finance in Customs and Excise sector.
- Rice tassel circle represents the purpose of Directorate General of Customs and Excise that is the prosperity and welfare of Indonesia.

== Equipment ==
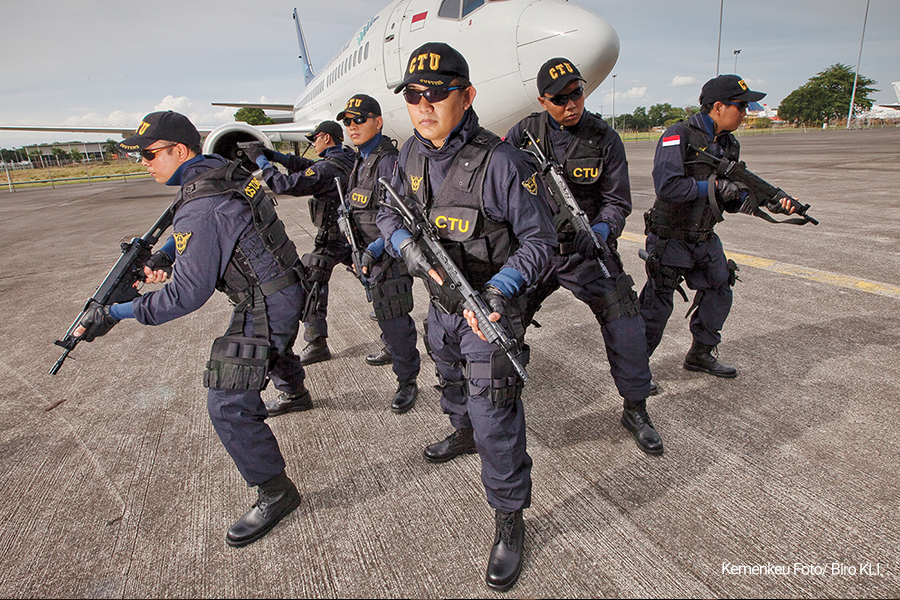
Customs Tactical Unit (CTU) officers on exercise mission

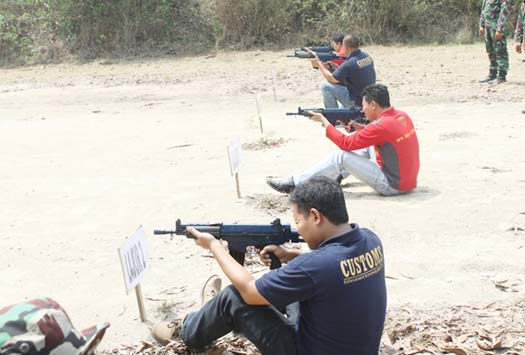
Personnel of the Indonesia Customs and Excise during a firing practice

=== Firearms ===
The customs officers are trained in the use of firearms.

Customs Tactical Unit (CTU) officers are also trained in the use of rifles.

Model	Origin	Type
Pindad P3A	Indonesia	Semi-automatic pistol
Pindad SBC-1	Indonesia	Assault rifle

=== Fleet ===
Customs Marine Patrol unit operates various arrays of ships, with six main categories:

- Fast Patrol Boat 60
- Fast Patrol Boat 38
- Fast Patrol Boat 28 with aluminium hull
- Fast Patrol Boat 28 with wooden hull
- Special boat class
- speedboat with 15m length or less

=== Others ===
Customs unit in airport and land border operates x-rays device, CCTV and K9 unit to assist them in checking potential smuggling, especially drugs.

From 1970-2000, DJBC operated several aircraft to support marine patrol. Among those are Beechraft King Air, Piper Twin Comanche and Piper Navajo. The last aircraft was grounded in 2002. Efforts had been made to revive DJBC's aerial surveillance capability to support intelligence and enforcement team at industrial sites, land border and coastal areas using UAV.

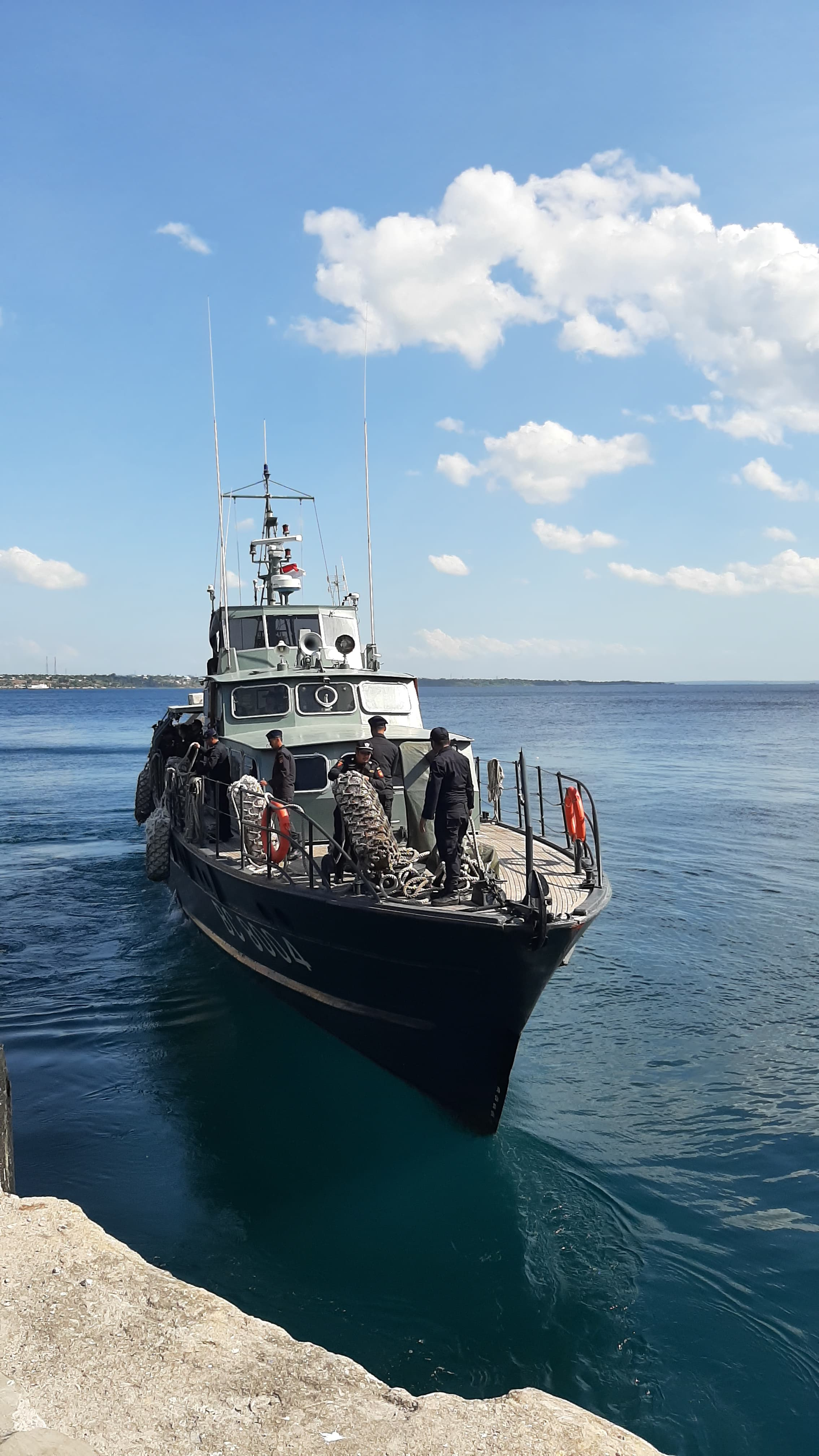
Indonesia Customs and Excise 28m-class Fast Patrol Boat with wooden hull during marine patrol operation

== Customs Clearance ==
=== Customs Clearance Process ===
- Exporter and Importer is required to provide Customs declaration to the Customs, the documents is pemberitahuan ekspor barang (PEB) for exporter and pemberitahuan impor barang (PIB) for importer.
- Documents for Customs declaration includes: invoice, packing list, document issued by carrier (Air waybill or Bill of lading), Certificate of origin if available, and import/export permit if required.
- Customs duties in Indonesia is based on self assessment. Exporter/importer themselves will then submit customs declaration and paid the customs based on their own assessment.
- Directorate General of Customs and Excise (DJBC) officer will then check customs declaration and the customs duties. If customs declaration is complied with regulation, they will issue customs release letter (surat pemberitahuan pengeluaran barang /SPPB) to the exporter/importer, if not then customs declaration will be rejected and exporter/importer may revise and re-submit customs declaration .
- Exported/Imported goods cannot leave customs area before receiving customs release letter (SPPB)
- All above processes are using online system to minimize interaction between exporter/importer and DJBC officer.

=== Channeling ===
DJBC is also implement automated channel system based on importer/exporter profile, commodity type of goods, track record and information contained in the DJBC intelligence. There are 4 channel:

- Special priority channel, also named Main Customs Partner (Mitra Utama /MITA), for exporter/importer with excellent track record, for importers of this type of goods expenditure is done automatically (automation system) which is a priority in terms of service, in terms of supervision then exporter/importer of this type will be subject to Post Clearance Audit system (PCA) and occasionally randomly by a computer system will be set for physical inspection. Exporters/Importers are required to apply for this channel and approved by DJBC to be able to use this channel.
- Green channel, this channel is intended for exporter/importer with a good track record and the export/import commodities are low risk. Physical inspection of goods may be carried out if selected as random sampling by the system or customs intelligence indicates requirement for further inspection of the goods.
- Yellow channel, this channel is for exporter/importer with a good track record and export/import commodities are medium risk. Physical inspection of goods may be carried out if selected as random sampling by the system or customs intelligence indicates requirement for further inspection of the goods.
- Red channel, is a channel imposed to new exporter/importer, existing exporter/importer with certain records, high risk exporter/importer because of poor track records, certain types of commodities, or customs brokerage with poor track record. This channel will undergo intensive supervision and physical inspection of goods.
