= Dyah Roro Esti Widya Putri =

East Java politician

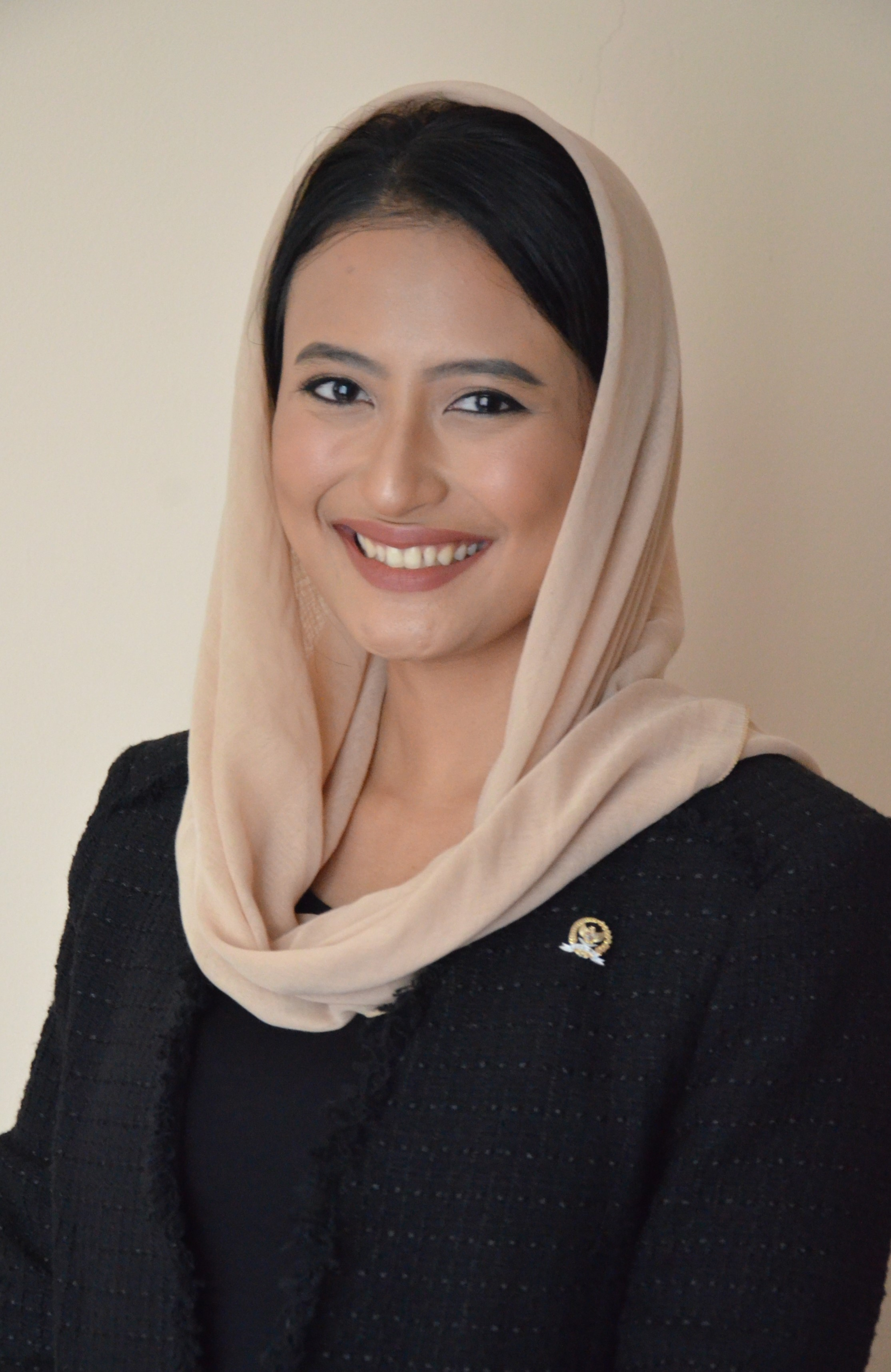

Member of the House of Representatives
- In office 1 October 2019 – 1 October 2024

Member of the Commission VII of the House of Representatives
- In office 1 October 2019 – 1 October 2024

Personal details
- Born: 25 May 1993 (age 33)
- Party: Golkar
- Parents: Satya Widya Yudha (father); Diah Ambarsari (mother)
- Education: Manchester University, Harvard University, Imperial College London
- Website: www.dyahroroesti.com

Dyah Roro Esti Widya Putri (born 25 May 1993), commonly referred to as Esti, is an Indonesian politician who served as a member of the House of Representatives from the East Java X constituency which includes the Gresik and Lamongan Regencies between 2019 and 2024. A member of the Golkar party, she also served as the Deputy General Treasurer of Golkar and as a member of the Commission VII of the House of Representatives, with scope of duties in the fields of Energy, Research and Technology, and the Environment. She is the child of former member of the House of Representatives Satya Widya Yudha.

== Early life, family, and education ==
=== Early life and family ===
Esti was born in Jakarta, on 25 May 1993. Her father is Satya Widya Yudha, a politician and businessman, and her mother is Diah Ambarsari. She has a single sibling, Satya Hangga Yudha Widya Putra, who is the President of Michigan State University Alumni Association and the co-founder of the Indonesian Energy and Environmental Institute (alongside Esti).

=== Education ===
Esti attended Marshall Road Elementary, Dwight School London, Global Jaya School, Beijing International School, Ho Chi Minh City International School, and Jakarta International School prior to University. She then attended and graduated from the University of Manchester, with a bachelor's degree in Economics and Sociology. After completing her undergraduate studies, Esti also attended and completed graduate-level courses from Harvard University. Esti was also a recipient of a full scholarship of the Education Fund Management Institute from the Ministry of Finance of the Republic of Indonesia, holding an MSc in Environmental Technology (with a focus in Pollution Management) from Imperial College London.

== Early career ==
After graduating from the Imperial College London, she alongside her brother, Hangga, co-founded the Indonesian Energy and Environmental Institute. The institute is an NGO dedicated to raising awareness about global warming and the negative consequences of climate change based in Jakarta, Indonesia. Esti would go on to serve as the institute's Executive Director from 2016 until 2019.

== Political career ==
In 2019, Esti ran for a seat in the House of Representatives in the East Java X constituency which includes the Gresik and Lamongan Regencies. She ran as a member of Golkar, and campaigned in the district by meeting people. She was accompanied by her father, who came from the neighboring East Java IX electoral district, which included the Tuban and Bojonegoro regencies. She won the election, with 48,377 votes, taking office on 1 October 2019.

As a member of the House of Representatives, she has been notable for proposing that the Commission VII of the DPR (which she is a part of) be disbanded because now it only has one ministry/institutional partner.

"I want to express the hearts of the majority or maybe all of Commission VII at this time. As we know, Commission VII only partners with one ministry, namely the Ministry of Energy and Mineral Resources. Considering that Research and Technology has joined the Ministry of Education and Culture, automatically becoming a partner of Commission X and the Ministry of Environment and Forestry partnering with Commission IV is certainly different from the previous period, where at that time the Ministry of Environment and Forestry partnered with two commissions, namely Commission IV and Commission VII."

— Dyah Roro Esti Widya Putri, a speech during a session of the People's Representative Council

In July 2021, Esti held a talk show known as 'Roro Talks' with the theme 'Woman in Politics' through the Live Instagram feature with several other female politicians. Including Krisdayanti and Tsamara Amany.

She failed to win a second term in the 2024 election.
