= Ministry of Trade (Indonesia) =

Government ministry of Indonesia

- Kementerian Perdagangan
- Logo of the Ministry of Trade

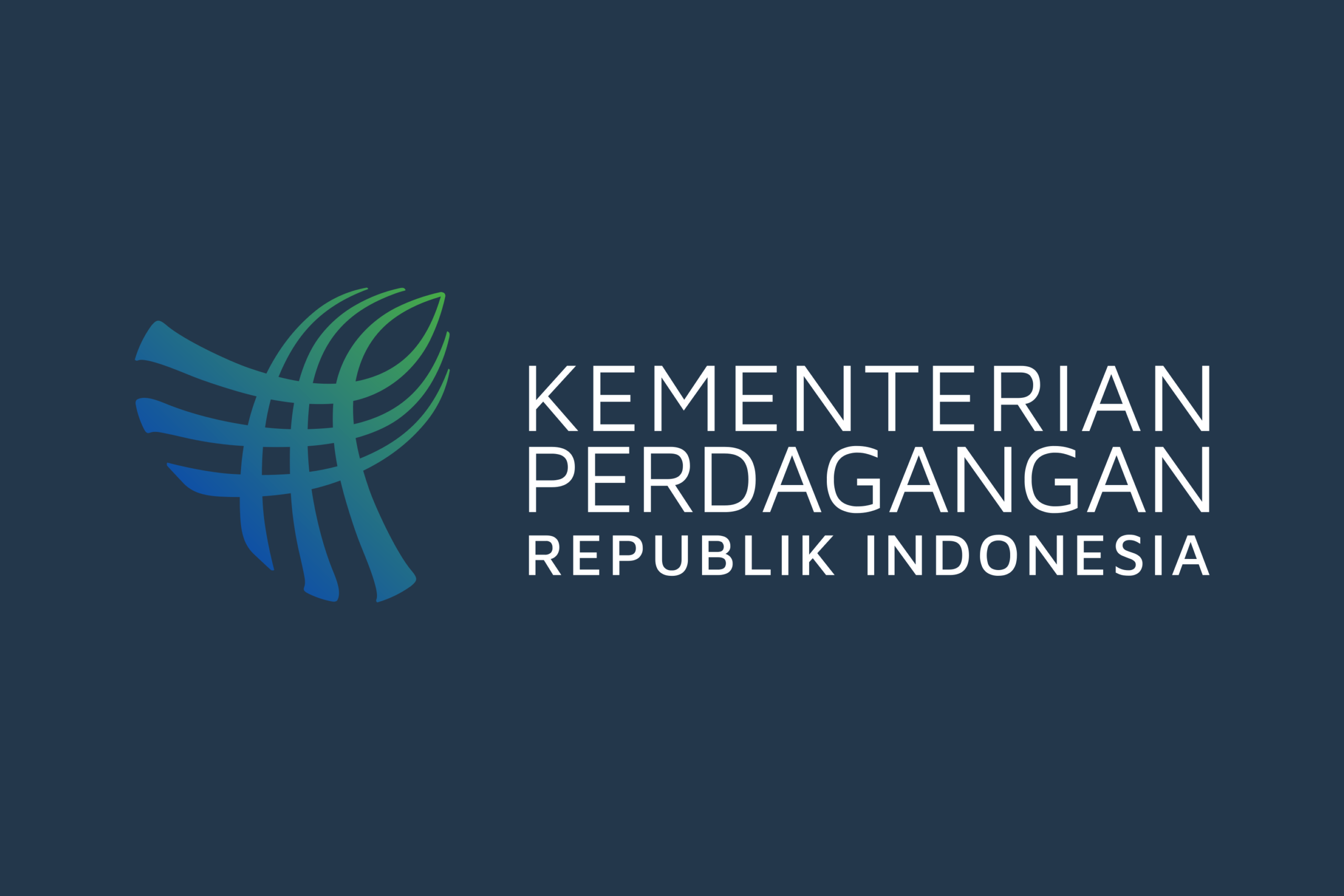
- Flag of the Ministry of Trade

Ministry overview
- Formed: 19 August 1945; 81 years ago
- Jurisdiction: Government of Indonesia
- Headquarters: Jalan M. I. Ridwan Rais No. 5 Jakarta Pusat 10110 Jakarta, Indonesia
- Minister responsible: Budi Santoso, Minister of Trade
- Deputy Minister responsible: Dyah Roro Esti, Deputy Minister of Trade
- Website: ministryoftradeidn.org

The Ministry of Trade (Indonesian: Kementerian Perdagangan) is a ministry of the Government of Indonesia that directs the formulation of policies related to the development of trade in Indonesia.

== Organization Structure ==
Based on Presidential Decree No. 168/2024, and as expanded by Ministry of Trade Decree No. 6/2025, the Ministry of Trade is organized into the following:

- Office of the Minister of Trade
- Office of the Deputy Minister of Trade
- Office of the General Secretariat
  - Bureau of Planning
  - Bureau of Organization and Human Resources
  - Bureau of Finance
  - Bureau of Legal Affairs
  - Bureau of General Affairs and Procurement
  - Bureau of Public Relations
  - Bureau of Trade Advocation
  - Center for Data and Information System
- Directorate General of Domestic Trade
  - Directorate General of Domestic Trade Secretariat
  - Directorate of Trading Development
  - Directorate of Trading Infrastructures and Logistics
  - Directorate of Domestic Market Fostering
  - Directorate of Marketing for Domestic Markets
  - Directorate of Domestic E-Trading and Trade Services
- Directorate General of Consumer Protection and Trade Order
  - Directorate General of Consumer Protection and Trade Order Secretariat
  - Directorate of Consumer Empowerment
  - Directorate of Standards and Quality Control
  - Directorate of Metrology
  - Directorate of Surveillance of Circulating Goods and Services
  - Directorate of Trade Order
- Directorate General of Foreign Trade
  - Directorate General of Foreign Trade Secretariat
  - Directorate of Agriculture and Forestry Products Exportation
  - Directorate of Industrial and Mining Products Exportation
  - Directorate of Importation
  - Directorate of Export and Import Facilitation
  - Directorate of Trade Security
- Directorate General of International Trade Negotiation
  - Directorate General of International Trade Negotiation Secretariat
  - Directorate of Trading Negotiation with Global Trading Organizations
  - Directorate of Trading Negotiation with ASEAN Countries
  - Directorate of Trading Negotiation with Inter Regional and International Trade Organizations
  - Directorate of Bilateral Trading Negotiation
  - Directorate of Trading Services Negotiation and E-Trading
- Directorate General of National Export Development
  - Directorate General of National Export Development Secretariat
  - Directorate of Market Development and Export Information
  - Directorate of Development of Exportation of Manufactured Products
  - Directorate of Development of Exportation of Trading Services and Creative Products
  - Directorate of Development of Exportation of Primary Products
- Inspectorate General
  - Inspectorate General Secretariat
  - Inspectorate I
  - Inspectorate II
  - Inspectorate III
  - Inspectorate IV
- Commodity Futures Trading Regulatory Agency
  - Commodity Futures Trading Regulatory Agency Secretariat
  - Bureau of Legal Affairs of Commodity Futures, Warehouse Receipt Systems, and Commodity Auction Markets
  - Bureau of Monitoring and Enforcement of Commodity Futures, Warehouse Receipt Systems, and Commodity Auction Markets
  - Bureau of Fostering and Development of Warehouse Receipt Systems and Commodity Auction Markets
  - Bureau of Fostering and Development of Commodity Futures
- Agency for Trade Human Resource Development
  - Center for Trading Apparatuses Development
  - Center for Exporters and Trade Service Human Resources Development
  - Center for Functionaries Development
  - Indonesian Academy of Metrology and Instrumentation
- Trade Policies Agency
  - Trade Policies Agency Secretariat
  - Center for Domestic Trading Policies
  - Center for International Trading Policies
  - Center for Exportation, Importation, and Trading Security Policies
- Expert Staff
  - Expert Staff of Trading Climate and Business Security
  - Expert Staff of International Trade
  - Expert Staff of Management, Administration, and Inter-institutional Relations

Aside from this structure, the ministry supervised several child organizations. By Ministry of Trade Decree No. 29/2022, these child agencies are:

- National Consumer Protection Agency
- Trade Attaches (stationed in Indonesian Embassies of Canada, United States, United Kingdom, Egypt, Moscow, France, Italy, Australia, China, Swiss, Netherland, Malaysia, South Korea, Japan, Belgian, Germany, Vietnam, Singapore, and Thailand)
- Indonesian Trade Promotion Centers (located in Johannesburg, Dubai, Osaka, Vancouver, New Delhi, Barcelona, Chicago, Lagos, Jeddah, Shanghai, Budapest, Los Angeles, Mexico City, Sydney, São Paulo, Riyadh, Milan, Santiago, Busan, Chennai, and Hamburg)
- Indonesian Economic and Trade Office to Taipei
- Indonesian Hongkong Trade Consul
