= Directorate General of Taxes (Indonesia) =

Government agency of Indonesia

- Direktorat Jenderal Pajak

Agency overview
- Formed: 1924
- Type: Revenue service
- Jurisdiction: Government of Indonesia
- Headquarters: Jalan Gatot Subroto, Kavling 40-42, Jakarta 12190, Indonesia
- Agency executive: Suryo Utomo (since November 2019), Director General
- Parent agency: Ministry of Finance
- Website: www.pajak.go.id

The Directorate General of Taxes (Indonesian: Direktorat Jenderal Pajak; also known as DJP) is an Indonesian government agency under Ministry of Finance which has the task of formulating and implementing taxation policies and technical standardization in the field of taxation.

== History ==
The organization of the Directorate General of Taxes was originally a combination of some taxation units, such as :

- Tax Office (Jawatan Pajak), which is responsible for carrying out tax collection based on regulation and legislation;
- Bureau of Auction (Jawatan Lelang), which is in charge of auctioning of confiscated goods for the settlement of state tax receivables;
- Tax Accountant Office (Jawatan Akuntan Pajak), which is in charge of assisting the Tax Office to carry out tax audit on the taxpayer; and
- Agricultural Tax Office (Jawatan Pajak Hasil Bumi), under Directorate of Regional Development Contribution (Direktorat Iuran Pembangunan Daerah (IPEDA)) to Directorate General of Monetary, which is responsible for carrying out tax collection for agriculture products tax and land tax.

Based on presidential decree No. 12 / 1976 dated 27 March 1976, IPEDA was transferred from Directorate General of Monetary to Directorate General of Tax.

In order to coordinate the implementation of taxation regulation in regional level, Inspectorate of Regional Tax was established, namely in Jakarta and some areas such as Sumatra, Java, Kalimantan, and East Indonesia. Inspectorate of Regional Tax later became the Regional Directorate of Taxation (Regional Office) as it is today.
