= Ministry of Finance (Indonesia) =

Government ministry of Indonesia

- Kementerian Keuangan
- Seal of the Ministry of Finance

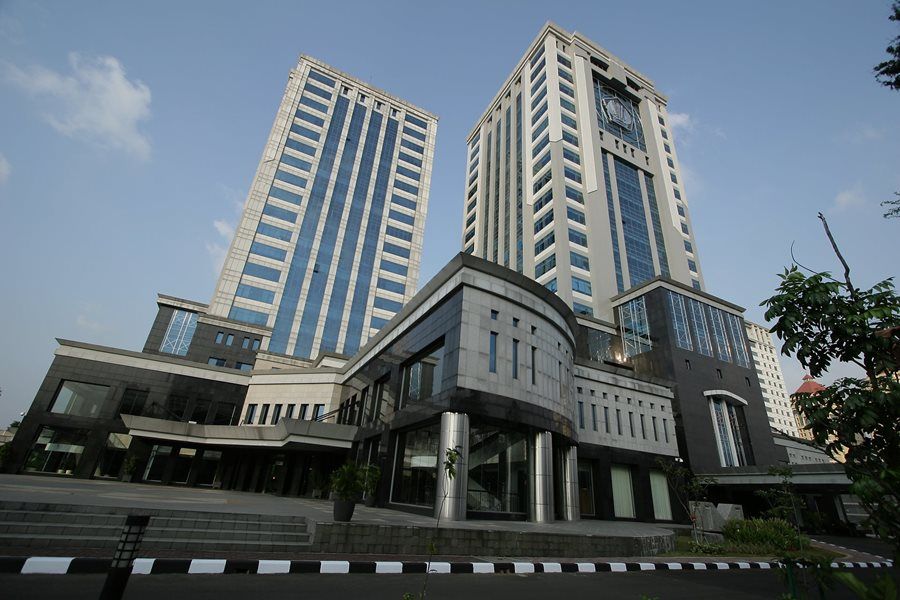
- Djuanda I and II buildings, Ministry of Finance headquarters

Ministry overview
- Formed: 19 August 1945; 81 years ago
- Jurisdiction: Government of Indonesia
- Headquarters: Gedung Djuanda I Jalan Dr. Wahidin Raya No. 1 Jakarta Pusat 10710 Jakarta, Indonesia; 6.171159023098652°S 106.83792075095751°E
- Motto: Nagara Dana Rakça ("Guardian of the State's Finance")
- Minister responsible: Suahasil Nazara, Minister of Finance
- Deputy Minister responsible: Juda Agung, Deputy Minister of Finance
- Child agencies: Directorate General of Taxation; Directorate General of Customs and Excise
- Website: kemenkeu.go.id

The Ministry of Finance (Indonesian: Kementerian Keuangan) is an Indonesian government ministry responsible for the nation's finance and state assets. The finance minister is responsible to the President. The ministry's motto is Nagara Dana Rakça, which means "guardian of state finance".

== History ==
=== Colonial period ===
The Dutch East India Company was given octrooi to print money during the rule of Governor General Jan Pieterszoon Coen. Since the 17th century, the Dutch East India Company increased state revenue. The company raised state revenue by an obligation to surrender agricultural products (verplichte leverentie), restrictions on agricultural production (contingenten, which increased the price) and obligations to plant strategic agricultural products such as coffee (preangerstelsel).

When the British took over Dutch East India as part of the War of the Sixth Coalition and assigned Stamford Raffles as Lieutenant-Governor, he instituted reformation through land tax (landrent), which changed the former Dutch system, to enable the public to buy British products with money. This reform failed to introduce a standardized monetary system because of a lack of support from the local aristocracy and inadequate public knowledge of money and taxation calculation.

After the Napoleonic Wars, Dutch East India was returned to the Dutch by the British under the Anglo-Dutch Treaty of 1814. Governor General Du Bus resumed economic development and established De Javasche Bank as part of financial and payment system reform. In 1836, van den Bosch introduced forced plantation (cultuurstelsel) to produce global-favored products. Forced plantation replaced the land tax system and aimed to introduce monetary economics to society. Forced plantation and forced labor had sufficient effect to introduce monetary economics.

Government policy was shifted into liberal economics. The policy was implemented as "laissez faire, laissez passer", in which economic responsibility is shifted to the private sector. The Department of Finance (Departement van Financien) was established to coordinate, develop and support financial administration. Centralized financial administration was done to facilitate management of state revenue and expenditure.

The Second World War put the Dutch colonial government in a difficult position. Before the Japanese landing, the President of De Javasche Bank, Dr. G.G. van Buttingha Wichers, sent gold deposits to South Africa and Australia from Cilacap. The Japanese colonial government forced the surrender of British, Dutch and Chinese Bank and invasion money. The war created a financial crisis.

=== Early independence ===
After Japan's surrender to the Allied powers in August 1945, Indonesia declared independence. Ministry of Finance is officially established to replace the function of Departement van Financien.

The economic situation was dire because of high inflation (due to circulation of De Javasche Bank money, Dutch East Indies money and Japanese Yen). Dr. Samsi, as Minister of Finance, had information that Escompto Bank in Surabaya held reserve money from the Dutch Colonial Government.

== Organization ==
The Organizational Structure of the Ministry of Finance, according to Presidential Regulation Number 158/2024, and as expanded by Ministry of Finance Decree No. 124/2024 consists of:

- Office of the Minister of Finance
- Office of the Deputy Minister of Finance
- Office of the General Secretary
  - Bureau of Planning and Finance
    - Division of Planning
    - Division of Performance and Risk Management
    - Division of Budgeting
    - Division of Treasury
    - Division of Accountancy and Financial Reporting
  - Bureau of Organization and Administration
    - Division of Organization Strategies and Business Process
    - Organizing Division of Revenue and Management and Functionaries Supports
    - Organizing Division of Budget, Treasury, State Assets, Financial Sectors, and Functionaries
    - Division of Position Analysis and Evaluation
    - Division of Administration and Public Services
  - Bureau of Legal Affairs
    - Division of Taxation, Customs, and Excise Laws and Regulation Evaluation
    - Division of Budget, Fiscal Balance, Finance, Treasury, and Public Services Agencies and Organizations
    - Division of State Wealth and Legal Information
    - Division of Financing Management Laws and Non-tax State Revenue
    - Division of Financial Laws and Agreements
    - Division of Apparatuses and Human Resources Laws
  - Bureau of Advocation
    - Division of Program and Knowledge Management
  - Bureau of Human Resources
    - Division of Administration and Fostering
    - Division of Program and Knowledge Management
  - Bureau of Communication and Information Services
    - Division of Strategic Communication Management
    - Division of Publication Management
    - Division of Inter-state Institutional Relation Management
    - Division of Media and Public Institutional Relations Management
    - Division of Data Management and Information Services
    - Division of Information Management and Public Education
  - Bureau of State Properties Management and Procurement
    - Division of Strategies and Performance Development
    - Division of State Properties Planning
    - Division of State Properties Management
    - Division of State Properties Administration
    - Division of Procurement Management
  - Bureau of General Affairs
    - Division of Ministerial Administration and Leadership Administration
    - Division of Household Affairs
    - Division of Finance
    - Division of Human Resources
    - Division of Organization, Administration, and Communication
    - Division of Internal Compliance
    - Division of State Properties Management
  - Center for Policy Analysis and Harmonization (attached to the General Secretariat)
- Directorate General of Economic and Fiscal Strategy (Directorate General I)
  - Directorate General I Secretariat
  - Strategic Directorate of Economic Stabilization
  - Strategic Directorate of Economic Welfare and Equity
  - Strategic Directorate of Economic Productivity and Growth
  - Strategic Directorate of Taxation
  - Strategic Directorate of Non-tax State Revenue
  - Strategic Directorate of State Budget
- Directorate General of Budget (Directorate General II)
  - Directorate General II Secretariat
  - Directorate of State Budget Formulation
  - Budgetary Directorate of Economics and Maritime Affairs
  - Budgetary Directorate of Human Development and Cultural Affairs
  - Budgetary Directorate of Political, Legal, Defense, Security, and State Treasury General
  - Directorate of Non-tax State Revenue from Natural Resources and Separated State Wealth
  - Directorate of Non-tax State Revenue from State Ministries/Institutions
  - Directorate of Potentials and Supervision of Non-tax State Revenue
  - Directorate of Budgetary System
  - Directorate of Budgetary Regulations Harmonization
- Directorate General of Taxation (Directorate General III)
  - Directorate General III Secretariat
  - Directorate of Taxation I
  - Directorate of Taxation II
  - Directorate of Investigation and Appraisal
  - Directorate of Law Enforcement
  - Directorate of Tax Supervision
  - Directorate of Objections and Appeals
  - Directorate of Potentials, Compliance, and Revenue
  - Directorate of Extension, Services, and Public Relations
  - Directorate of Tax Data and Information
  - Directorate of Internal Compliance and Apparatuses Transformation
  - Directorate of Tax Information, Technology, and Communication
  - Directorate of Business Process Transformation
  - Directorate of International Taxation
  - Directorate of Taxation Intelligence
- Directorate General of Customs and Excise (Directorate General IV)
  - Directorate General IV Secretariat
  - Directorate of Customs Techniques
  - Directorate of Customs Facilities
  - Directorate of Excise Techniques and Facilities
  - Directorate of Customs and Excise International Partnerships
  - Directorate of Objections, Appeals, and Legal Affairs
  - Directorate of Customs and Excise Information
  - Directorate of Internal Compliance
  - Directorate of Customs and Excise Audit
  - Directorate of Prosecution and Investigation
  - Directorate of Revenues and Strategic Planning
  - Directorate of Narcotics Interdiction
  - Directorate of Communication and Service Users Guidance
- Directorate General of Treasury (Directorate General V)
  - Directorate General V Secretariat
  - Directorate of Budget Execution
  - Directorate of Treasury Fund Management
  - Directorate of Investment Management System
  - Financial Management Fostering Directorate of Public Services Agencies/Organizations
  - Directorate of Accountancy and Financial Reporting
  - Directorate of Treasury System
  - Directorate of Treasury Information System and Technologies
- Directorate General of State Assets (Directorate General VI)
  - Directorate General VI Secretariat
  - Directorate of State Wealth Policies Formulation
  - Directorate of Separated State Wealth
  - Directorate of State Wealth Management
  - Directorate of Appraisal
  - Directorate of Auction
  - Directorate of Legal Affairs and Public Relations
  - Directorate of Transformation and Information System
- Directorate General of Fiscal Balance (Directorate General VII)
  - Directorate General VII Secretariat
  - Directorate of General Fund Transfer
  - Directorate of Special Fund Transfer
  - Directorate of Village Fund, Incentive, Special Autonomy, and Special Regions
  - Directorate of Regional Taxes and Regional Retribution
  - Directorate of Funding and Regional Economy
  - Directorate of Fiscal Balance System
- Directorate General of Financing and Risk Management (Directorate General VIII)
  - Directorate General VIII Secretariat
  - Directorate of Loans and Grants
  - Directorate of State Securities
  - Directorate of Sharia Funding
  - Directorate of State Financial Risk Management
  - Directorate of State Supports and Infrastructure Funding Management
  - Directorate of Funding Strategies and Portfolios
  - Directorate of Evaluation, Accountancy, and Settlements
- Directorate General of Financial Sector Stability and Development (Directorate General IX)
  - Directorate General IX Secretariat
  - Directorate of Banking, Financial Markets, and Other Funding Institutions Development
  - Directorate of Pension Funds, Insurance, and Actuarial Development
  - Directorate of Financial System Stability and Financial Sector Policies Synchronization
  - Directorate of Financial Professional Fostering and Guidance
  - Directorate of Regional and Bilateral Partnerships
  - Directorate of Multilateral Partnerships and Sustainable Financing
- General Inspectorate
  - General Inspectorate Secretariat
  - Inspectorate I
  - Inspectorate II
  - Inspectorate III
  - Inspectorate IV
  - Inspectorate V
  - Inspectorate VI
  - Inspectorate VII
  - Investigative Inspectorate
- Financial Technology, Information, and Intelligence Agency
  - Financial Technology, Information, and Intelligence Agency Secretariat
  - Center for Transformation and Changes Management
  - Center for Information Technology Architecture and Administration
  - Center for Information System Management
  - Center for Data and Information
  - Center for Information Infrastructure, Services, and Security
  - Center for Financial and Economic Intelligence
- Financial Education and Training Agency
  - Financial Education and Training Agency Secretariat
  - Education and Training Center for Leadership and Management
  - Education and Training Center for Budgeting and Treasury
  - Education and Training Center for Taxation
  - Education and Training Center for Customs and Excise
  - Public Financial Education and Training Center
  - Center for Functionaries Development and Quality Assurance
- Board of Experts
  - Senior Ministerial Expert for Tax Regulation and Law Enforcement
  - Senior Ministerial Expert for Tax Compliance
  - Senior Ministerial Expert for Tax Supervision
  - Senior Ministerial Expert for State Revenue
  - Senior Ministerial Expert for Non-Tax State Revenue
  - Senior Ministerial Expert for State Expenditure
  - Senior Ministerial Expert for Macroeconomics and International Finance
  - Senior Ministerial Expert for Financial Services and Capital Markets
  - Senior Ministerial Expert for Law and Institutional Relations

== See also ==
- Directorate General of Customs and Excise
- Directorate General of Taxes
