= Vehicle registration plates of Indonesia =

Indonesia Tanda Nomor Kendaraan Bermotor
- The latest design of registration plates in Indonesia
- Country: Indonesia
- Country code: RI

Current series
- Size: Cars: 460 mm × 135 mm 18.1 in × 5.3 in Motorcycles: 275 mm × 115 mm 10.8 in × 4.5 in
- Material: Aluminium

Availability
- Issued by: Traffic Corps of the Indonesian National Police

Motorized vehicles in Indonesia are required to have registration plates, which must be displayed both at the front and back of the vehicles. The issuing of number plates is regulated and administered by SAMSAT (Indonesian: Sistem Administrasi Manunggal Satu Atap, lit. 'One-stop Administration Services Office'), which is a collaboration between the Indonesian National Police, provincial offices of regional revenue, and the national mandatory vehicle insurance operator Jasa Raharja.

== Registration area codes ==
The lettering convention denoting the area of registration is a legacy of the Dutch colonial era and does not reflect the current regional divisions of the country into provinces. They follow the old system of Dutch Karesidenan or residencies lettering systems, which were adopted in the 1920s, and the Territorial Police system which was abolished in 2010.

Where area codes are assigned

Prefix codes for Java region

Prefix codes for North Sumatra

Prefix codes for South Sulawesi

The list of area codes are:

Police Unit	Prefix	Division
Sumatra
Polda Aceh	BL	Aceh
Polda Sumut	BB	North Sumatra: Western region: Dairi, Pakpak Bharat, Samosir, Toba, Tapanuli (Central, North, South), Humbang Hasundutan, Sibolga, Mandailing Natal, Padangsidempuan, Padang Lawas (Regency, North), Gunungsitoli, Nias (Regency, North, South, West)
Polda Sumut	BK	North Sumatra: Eastern region: Medan, Binjai, Deli Serdang, Serdang Bedagai, Langkat, Karo, Tebing Tinggi, Simalungun, Pematangsiantar, Batubara, Asahan, Tanjungbalai, Labuhanbatu (Regency, North, South)
Polda Sumbar	BA	West Sumatra
Polda Riau	BM	Riau
Polda Kepri	BP	Riau Islands
Polda Jambi	BH	Jambi
Polda Bengkulu	BD	Bengkulu
Polda Sumsel	BG	South Sumatra
Polda Babel	BN	Bangka Belitung Islands
Polda Lampung	BE	Lampung
Java
Polda Banten	A	Banten (except Tangerang areas)
Polda Metro Jaya	B	ex Jakarta residency: Jakarta, Depok, Tangerang areas (City, Regency, South), Bekasi areas (City, Regency)
Polda Jabar	F	West Java: ex western Preanger Regencies residency (Bogor Regency, City, Cianjur, Sukabumi Regency, City)
Polda Jabar	T	West Java: ex Karawang residency (Purwakarta, Karawang, Subang)
Polda Jabar	E	West Java: ex Cirebon residency (Cirebon Regency, City, Indramayu, Majalengka, Kuningan)
Polda Jabar	D	West Java: ex central Preanger Regencies residency (Bandung Regency, City, Cimahi, West Bandung)
Polda Jabar	Z	West Java: ex eastern Preanger Regencies residency (Garut, Tasikmalaya Regency, City, Sumedang, Ciamis, Pangandaran, Banjar)
Polda Jateng	R	Central Java: ex Banyumas residency (Banyumas, Cilacap, Purbalingga, Banjarnegara)
Polda Jateng	G	Central Java: ex Pekalongan residency (Pekalongan Regency, City, Tegal Regency, City, Brebes, Batang, Pemalang)
Polda Jateng	H	Central Java: ex Semarang residency (Semarang Regency, City, Salatiga, Kendal, Demak)
Polda Jateng	K	Central Java: ex Pati residency (Pati, Kudus, Jepara, Rembang, Blora, Grobogan)
Polda Jateng	AA	Central Java: ex Kedu residency (Magelang Regency, City, Purworejo, Kebumen, Temanggung, Wonosobo)
Polda Jateng	AD	Central Java: ex Surakarta Sunanate (Surakarta, Sukoharjo, Boyolali, Sragen, Karanganyar, Wonogiri, Klaten)
Polda DIY	AB	Yogyakarta
Polda Jatim	AE	East Java: ex Madiun residency (Madiun Regency, City, Ngawi, Magetan, Ponorogo, Pacitan)
Polda Jatim	AG	East Java: ex Kediri residency (Kediri Regency, City, Blitar Regency, City, Tulungagung, Nganjuk, Trenggalek)
Polda Jatim	S	East Java: ex Bojonegoro residency (Bojonegoro, Mojokerto Regency, City, Tuban, Lamongan, Jombang)
Polda Jatim	W	East Java: Sidoarjo, Gresik
Polda Jatim	L	East Java: Surabaya
Polda Jatim	M	East Java: Madura Island
Polda Jatim	N	East Java: ex Malang residency (Malang Regency, City, Probolinggo Regency, City, Pasuruan Regency, City, Lumajang, Batu)
Polda Jatim	P	East Java: ex Besuki residency (Bondowoso, Situbondo, Jember, Banyuwangi)
Kalimantan
Polda Kalbar	KB	West Kalimantan
Polda Kalteng	KH	Central Kalimantan
Polda Kalsel	DA	South Kalimantan
Polda Kaltim	KT	East Kalimantan
Polda Kaltara	KU	North Kalimantan
Sulawesi
Polda Sulut	DL	North Sulawesi: Islands (Sangihe Islands, Talaud Islands, Sitaro Islands)
Polda Sulut	DB	North Sulawesi: Mainland (Manado, Bitung, Tomohon, Kotamobagu, Minahasa Regency, North, South, Southeast, Bolaang Mongondow Regency, North, South, East)
Polda Gorontalo	DM	Gorontalo
Polda Sulteng	DN	Central Sulawesi
Polda Sulbar	DC	West Sulawesi
Polda Sulsel	DP	South Sulawesi: Northern region (Barru, Parepare, Pinrang, Sidenreng Rappang, Enrekang, Tana Toraja, North Toraja, Palopo, Luwu Regency, North, East)
Polda Sulsel	DW	South Sulawesi: Central region (Bone, Soppeng, Wajo, Sinjai)
Polda Sulsel	DD	South Sulawesi: Southern region (Makassar, Gowa, Maros, Pangkajene Islands, Takalar, Jeneponto, Bulukumba, Bantaeng, Selayar)
Polda Sultra	DT	Southeast Sulawesi
Nusa Tenggara
Polda Bali	DK	Bali
Polda NTB	DR	West Nusa Tenggara: Lombok
Polda NTB	EA	West Nusa Tenggara: Sumbawa
Polda NTT	ED	East Nusa Tenggara: Sumba
Polda NTT	EB	East Nusa Tenggara: Flores, Alor, Lembata
Polda NTT	DH	East Nusa Tenggara: Timor
Maluku
Polda Maluku	DE	Maluku
Polda Malut	DG	North Maluku
Papua
Polda Papua	PA	Papua
Polda Pabar	PB	West Papua
Polda Papeg	PG	Highland Papua
Polda Pasel	PS	South Papua
Polda Pateng	PT	Central Papua
Polda PBD	PY	Southwest Papua
Non-motorized vehicles
	SB	East Java: Surabaya (Trishaws/Rickshaws)
	YB	Yogyakarta (Trishaws/Rickshaws)
	YK	Yogyakarta (Horse carriage)
	KS	Central Java: Surakarta (Trishaws/Rickshaws)

Several areas provide license plates for non-motorized transport vehicles. In Yogyakarta, YB is used for rickshaws. A white-on-blue license plate with area code SB is issued for rickshaws operating in the city of Surabaya. In Banjarmasin, rickshaws operating in the city are issued with plate using a unique format, XXXX BS.

=== Defunct area codes ===
There were some area codes that are no longer in use. These include:

- BR – ex Borneo Residency, Western region
- DF – East Timor
- DS – Papua, prior to 2016.

== History ==
=== Colonial era ===
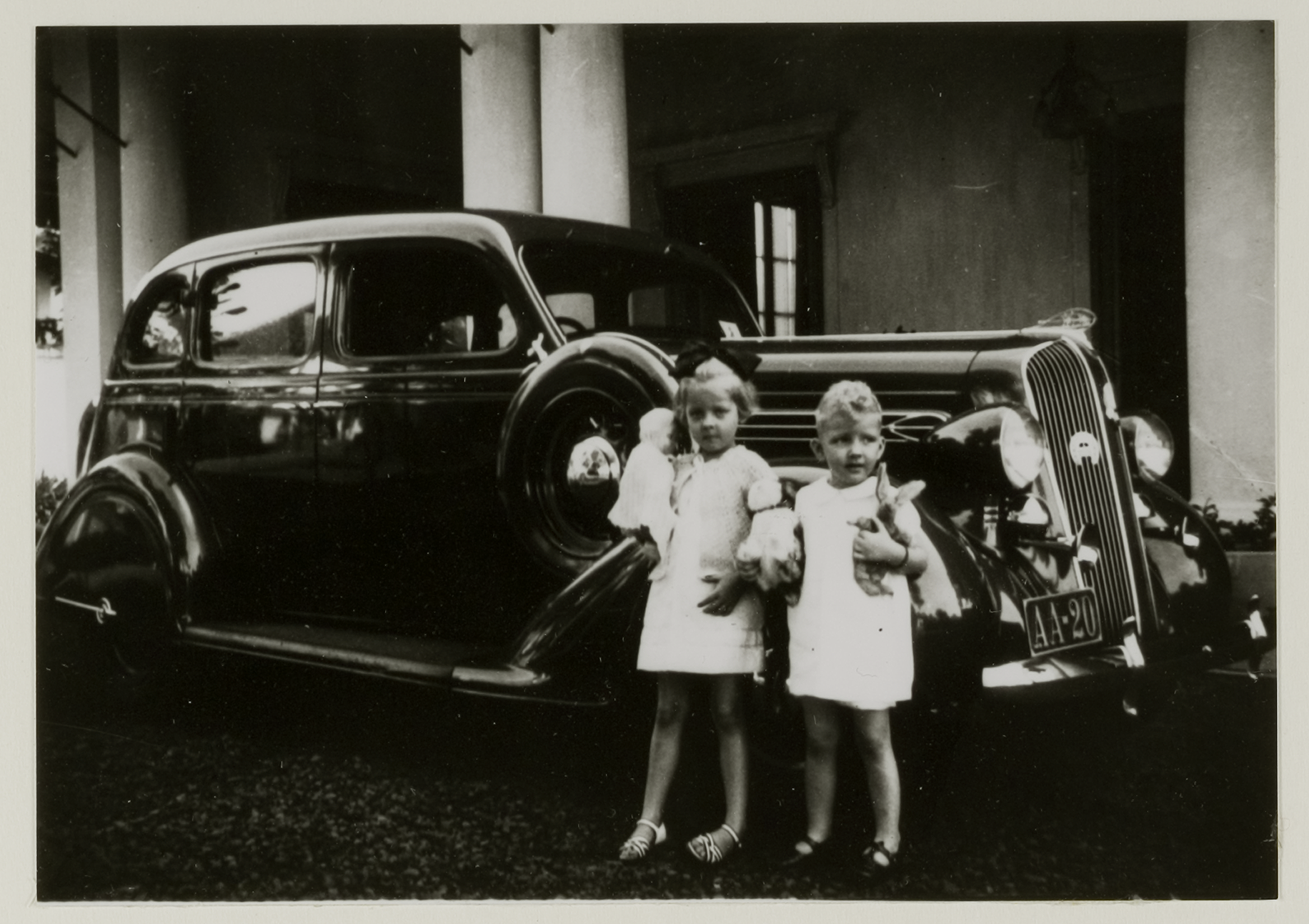
Two children standing next to a Plymouth with "AA 20" plate. The car belonged to the family of J.W. Bijleveld. c. 1936.

Vehicle registration plates were first introduced in the Dutch East Indies in 1900. The early format included regional codes such as CH for Cirebon, SB for Surabaya, and SOK for the eastern coast of Sumatra; and registration numbers with no official standards. Plates were not always installed at the front and the rear of the vehicle; some owners affixed the plates on the side of the vehicle. For international purposes, the Government of the Dutch East Indies introduced the code IN for government vehicles. IN plates were elliptical and the registration numbers were placed below on a rectangular plate.

A more-structured system was introduced in 1917 with the implementation of regulations regarding the content of applications for number and driving licenses, the specification of numbers and letters, the models of number and driving licenses, the establishment of registers of holders of the licenses and the publication of the contents of the registers. The regulation obliged vehicle owners to register their vehicles. The Karesidenan-based system was first implemented on Java and afterwards elsewhere in the colony. The alphabetical codes were:

- A: Banten
- B: Batavia (now Greater Jakarta)
- D: Preanger Regencies (now Greater Bandung)
- E: Cirebon
- G: Pekalongan
- H: Semarang
- K: Rembang
- L: Surabaya
- M: Madura
- N: Pasuruan, Malang
- P: Besuki
- R: Banyumas
- AA: Kedu
- AB: Special Region of Yogyakarta
- AD: Surakarta (Sragen Regency, Klaten Regency, Karanganyar Regency, Boyolali Regency)
- AE: Madiun (Ngawi Regency, Ponorogo Regency, Magetan Regency, Pacitan Regency)
- AG: Kediri (Tulungagung Regency, Blitar, Trenggalek Regency, Nganjuk Regency)
- BA: Western coast of Sumatra
- BB: Tapanuli
- BD: Bengkulu
- BE: Lampung
- BG: Palembang
- BH: Jambi
- BK: East Sumatra (now Greater Medan)
- BL: Aceh
- BM: Riau
- BN: Bangka
- BP: Riau Islands
- BR: West Kalimantan
- DA: South Kalimantan and East Kalimantan
- DB: Manado
- DD: Sulawesi
- DE: Ambon
- DG: Ternate
- DH: Timor
- DK: Bali and Lombok

Until the 1920s, regional codes were added along with the Karesidenan regional expansion. For example, Bogor used the code F, Bojonegoro used the code S, and Western Papua used the code DS.

=== Post-colonial era ===
==== 1980s ====
The license plate design during the New Order, with the expiry date above the registration numbers

The early format of registration plates remained in use after Indonesia proclaimed its independence in 1945. At the beginning of the 1980s, plates with four-digit numbers separated by a dot at the bottom that denote the month and year of expiry (e.g. 06•87) was introduced. Vehicle owners must pay a tax to renew the plate every five years. The typefaces are embossed. There were two variations of design during the New Order; the expiry date would be placed above or below the registration numbers.

==== 21st century ====
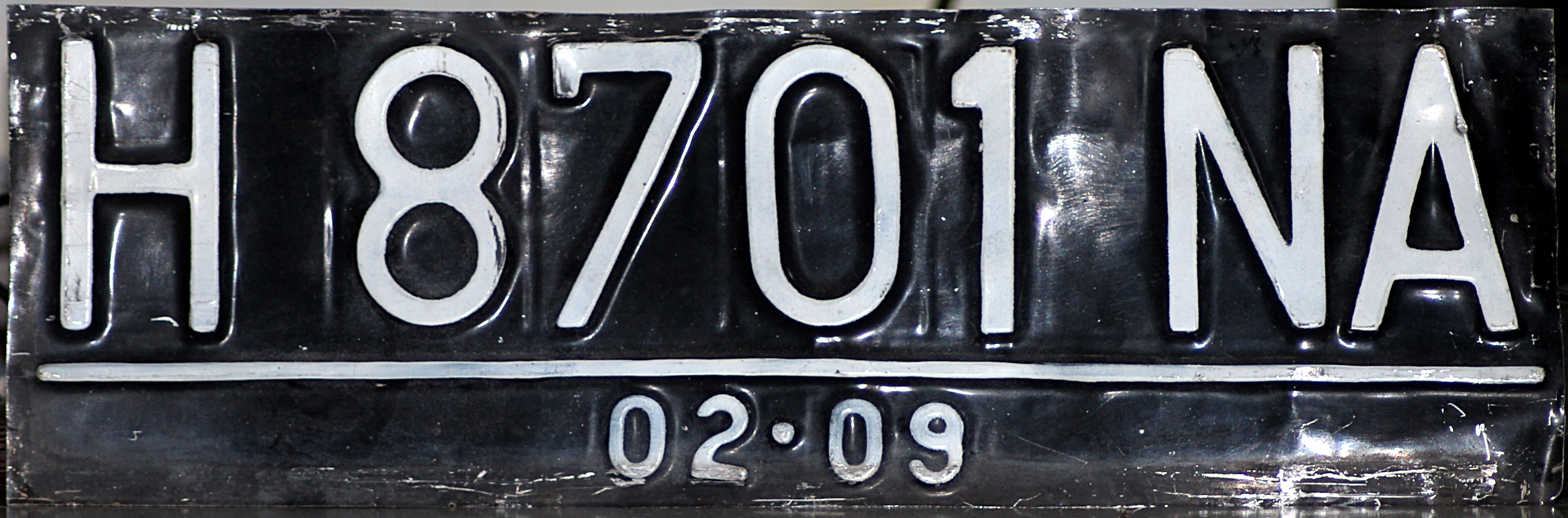
Design of Indonesian registration plate for private vehicles from 2000s to April 2011.

Along with the increase of motorized vehicles in Indonesia, the technical design and specification of vehicle registration plates began to be regulated by the Direktorat Lalu Lintas Kepolisian Negara Republik Indonesia/Ditlantas Polri (Traffic Directorate) of the Indonesian National Police. The size of the license plates during the 2000s was 395 mm × 135 mm (15.6 in × 5.3 in) (four wheel vehicles or more) or 250 mm × 105 mm (9.8 in × 4.1 in) (two or three wheel vehicles) with wide alphabets and a stripe that separates the registration numbers and expiry date. In the lower left and upper right corners is the Traffic Police symbol, and at the lower-right and upper-left corners is a "DIRLANTAS POLRI" sign as a security feature and proof of the originality of the license plate.

The design of Indonesian registration plate for private vehicles (especially cars, trucks, and buses) from April 2011 to June 2022

In April 2011, the design of the license plate was redesigned. The new plates are 5 cm (2.0 in) longer to accommodate more characters and the typeface is slimmer. The Traffic Corps of the Indonesian National Police (Korps Lalu Lintas Kepolisian Negara Republik Indonesia, abbreviated as Korlantas Polri) introduced their more-complete coat of arms, with shield and ribbon with the letter "Dharmakerta Marga Raksyaka". The abbreviation "DITLANTAS" became "KORLANTAS". The license plates are made from 1 mm (0.039 in)-thick aluminium with edge lines with the same color as the numbers. The size of the plate for two-or-three-wheeled vehicles now is 275 mm × 115 mm (10.8 in × 4.5 in), while for four-or-more-wheeled vehicles was 430 mm × 135 mm (16.9 in × 5.3 in).

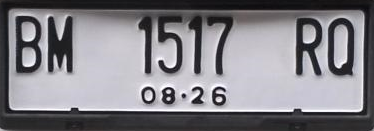
The new color scheme of the personal vehicle plates since 2022

In June 2022, the Traffic Corps changed the color scheme for personal and rental vehicles from black plates with white letters to white plates with black letters. The new color scheme was implemented to ease the detection of motoring offenses with traffic enforcement cameras. To increase the effectivity of the new color scheme, FE-Schrift typeface was first implemented for regular personal four-wheel plates only since November 2022. Besides that, commercial/public transport (black on yellow) and government-owned (white on red) vehicle plates began to use FE-Schrift at the same time. Currently, the size of the plate for four-or-more-wheeled vehicles is 460 mm × 135 mm (18.1 in × 5.3 in), with the width upsized from 430 mm to 460 mm to accommodate the new wider FE-Schrift typeface and the suffix extension to three letters, while the size of the plate for two-or-three-wheeled vehicles has not changed.

== Registration plate design convention ==
=== Size and formatting ===
Indonesian vehicle registration plates for four-wheel vehicles are approximately 460 mm × 135 mm and plates for two-or-three-wheel vehicles are approximately 275 mm × 115 mm. All plates are constructed from stamped sheet metal. With some exceptions, plates use the following format: LL NNNN LL where "L" are letters of the Latin alphabet, and "N" numbers from "0" to "9" (the first number is never a "0"). The first single-or-double-letter prefixes denote the area of registration. This is followed by number between 1 and 9999 without leading zeroes. This is then followed by one or two letters although they may be optional. For example: B 1945 PKL is a vehicle registered in Central Jakarta city; it begins with B. A smaller, four-digit number separated by dot is located at the top (old format, with horizontal line as divider) or bottom (newer format, commonly without divider) of the plate with following format: NN•NN denoting the month and year of the plate's expiry (e.g. 01•28 means until January 2028). The owner must pay a tax to renew it every five years.

=== Color scheme ===
==== Regular vehicles (Conventional and Hybrid) ====
Vehicles in Indonesia are coded based on their classes and uses, which four or more wheelers were used FE-Schrift since November 2022. These are:

Use	Color			Image	
Use	Letter	Plate	Bottom trim	Four-or-more-wheelers (cars, trucks, buses, etc.)	Two-or-three-wheelers (motorcycles, autorickshaws, etc.)
For privately owned vehicles. Trucks that are registered for private use are issued with this plate, and also the ambulances.	Black	White	–		
For commercial vehicle or public transportation vehicles, such as buses, taxis, angkot (share taxis), auto rickshaws and commercial trucks	Black	Yellow	–		
For vehicles used by fire departments, government ambulances, government officials and other governmental vehicles administered under their respective local governments	White	Red	–		
For vehicles exclusively used in free-trade zones i.e. Batam (see Indonesia–Malaysia–Singapore Growth Triangle)	Black	Green	–		
For vehicles belonging to diplomatic or consular corps of foreign countries, commonly used by foreign embassies or vehicles belonging to international organizations. Diplomatic plates are always using CD prefix code, while consulars use CC,	Black	White	Black trim		

==== Electric vehicles (EV) ====
The Indonesian National Police has set a special license plate for electric vehicles with additional blue trim at the expiry date row in accordance with the regulations in the Decree of the Head of the Traffic Corps of the Indonesian National Police in 2020. four or more wheelers are used FE-Schrift since November 2022.

Use	Color			Image	
Use	Letter	Plate	Bottom trim	Four-or-more-wheelers (cars, trucks, buses, etc.)	Two-or-three-wheelers (motorcycles, autorickshaws, etc.)
For privately owned electric vehicles and rental electric vehicles.	Black	White	Blue trim		
For commercial or public transportation electric vehicles, such as electric buses, electrically powered taxis, and commercial electric trucks	Black	Yellow	Blue trim		
For electric vehicles used by fire departments, government ambulances, government officials and other governmental EVs administered under their respective local governments	White	Red	Blue trim		
For electric vehicles exclusively used in free-trade zones i.e. Batam (see Indonesia–Malaysia–Singapore Growth Triangle)	Black	Green	Blue trim		
For electric vehicles belonging to diplomatic or consular corps of foreign countries, commonly used by foreign embassies or vehicles belonging to international organizations. Diplomatic plates are always using CD prefix code, while consulars use CC,	White	Black	Blue trim		

==== Temporary registration plates ====
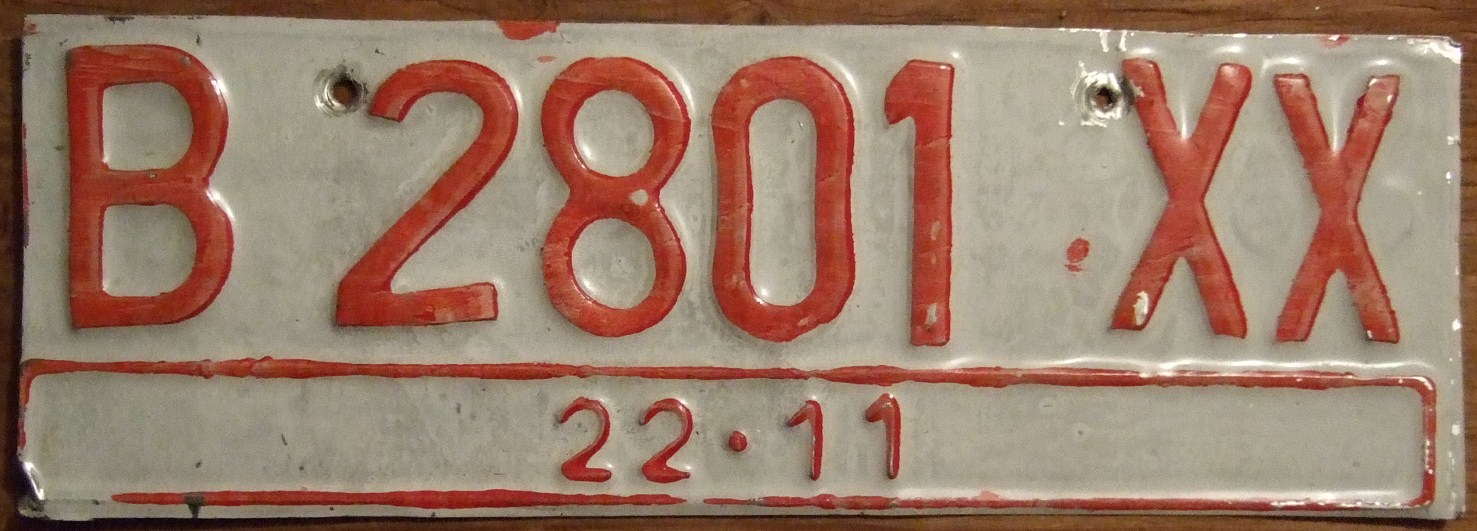
Temporary plate from dealership plate for new vehicles. This temporary registration plate format is issued nationwide for all types of vehicles.

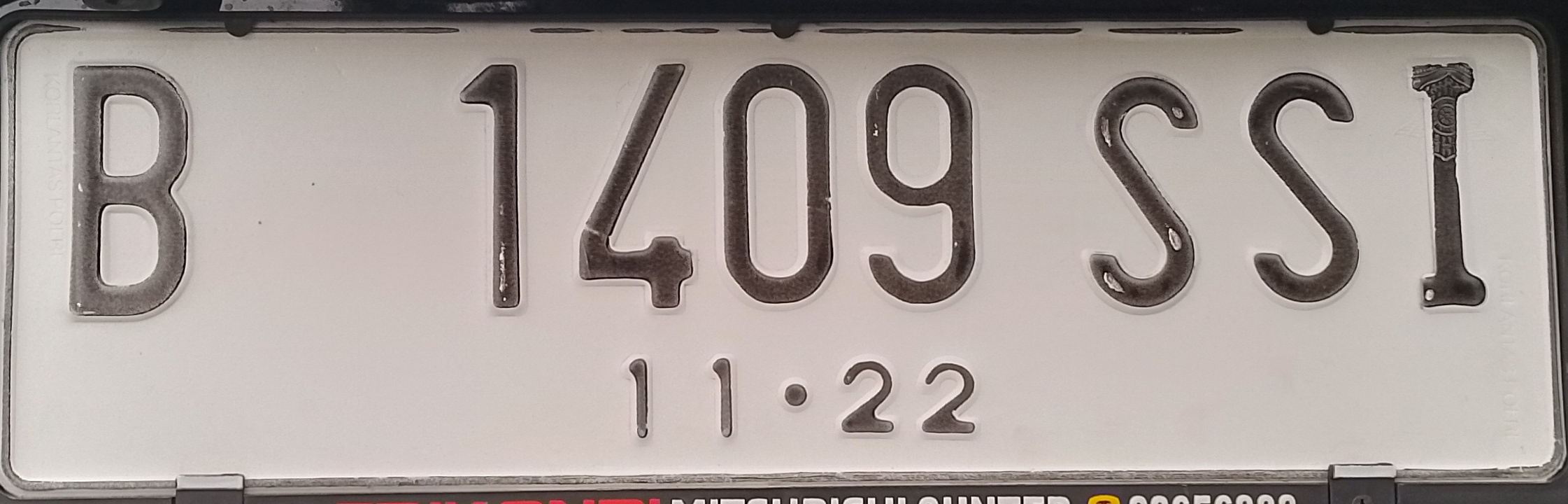
This format is exclusively issued for new cars in Greater Jakarta, SS is abbreviation of Sifat Sementara (temporary use) and I is a random alphabet.

Temporary registration plates currently have two formats, namely:

- Red on white: Vehicles that have not been registered yet, or for new cars that have no owners yet or no legal identification. This format is widely used nationally for all vehicle types.
- Black on white with special suffix: This format is exclusively used within the Greater Jakarta Metropolitan Regional Police jurisdiction (which uses the registration code B) and commonly used for new car owners that haven't got the permanent registration yet. It looks similar with the permanent personal vehicle plates, but added with the SS suffix, which is an abbreviation of Sifat Sementara (temporary use). In January 2024, newer suffixes were introduced, such as LK, AK, PC, PD, AZ and BC. Temporary plates with this format are only valid for 30 days. For example: B 2814 SSP, B 2309 LKV, and B 1491 PDQ. Other regions such as Bandung and Surabaya has their own temporary plate suffixes. For example D 1686 QGK registered in Bandung, and L 1107 PRN registered in Surabaya.

==== Former color scheme ====
Use	Color			Usage period	Image	
Use	Letter	Plate	Bottom trim	Usage period	Four-or-more-wheelers (cars, trucks, buses, etc.)	Two-or-three-wheelers (motorcycles, autorickshaws, etc.)
For privately owned vehicles. Trucks that are registered for private use were issued with this plate, so are the ambulances. Superseded by the black on white color scheme but still valid during 5-year transition period.	White	Black	–	April 2011–July 2022		
For privately owned vehicles. Trucks that are registered for private use were issued with this plate, so are the ambulances. Superseded by the black on white color scheme but still valid during 5-year transition period.	White	Black	–	August 2019–July 2022 (customized plates)		
For privately owned vehicles. Trucks that are registered for private use were issued with this plate, so are the ambulances. Superseded by the black on white color scheme but still valid during 5-year transition period.	White	Black	Blue trim	January 2020–July 2022 (regular registration plates, currently used by temporary license plate until regular plate issued)		
White plates before change by FE-Schrift used for privately owned vehicles. Trucks that are registered for private use were issued with this plate, so are the ambulances.	Black	White	–	July–November 2022 (regular registration plates)		

=== Special code examples ===
==== Vehicle category (Jakarta only) ====
In Jakarta, these codes are applied based on vehicle categories. These include:

- B – Code for Double Cabin Pickups
- A/B/D/W/E/R – Code for sedans
- A/C/U/Z – Code for pickups
- D – Code for trucks
- F/K/O/Z/R/Y/I – Code for minibuses
- *HX/*IX – Code for ambulances
- J/L/C – Code for SUVs
- Q/U – Code for government staff
- T/U – Code for taxis
- V/P/M/G/Y/W/U – Code for Minibuses

For example, B 9031 BAY indicates that the vehicle is a pickup, while B 1032 DFA indicates that the vehicle is a minibus.

==== State officials ====
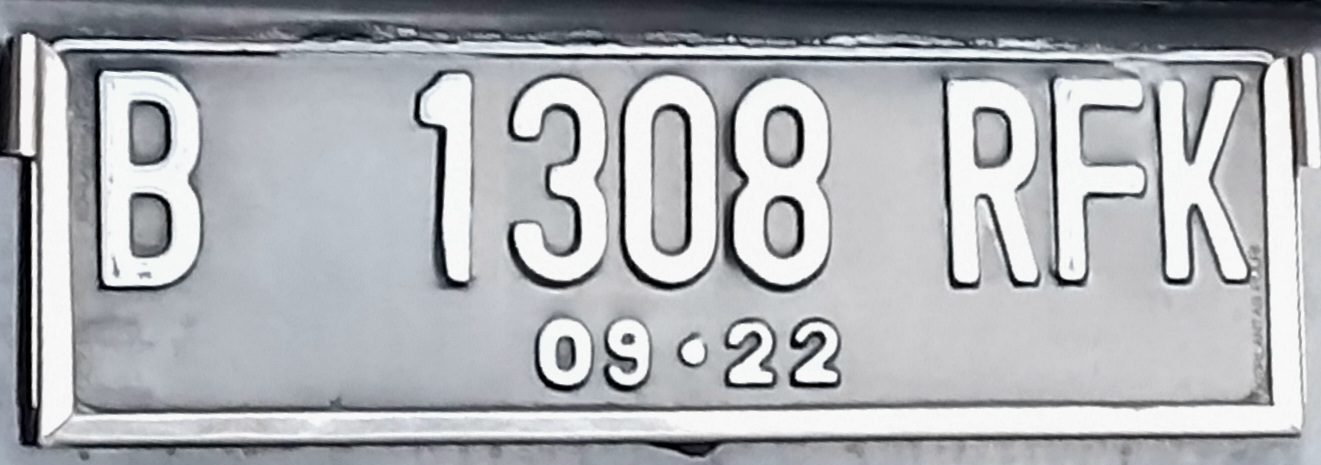
A plate with special RF suffix plates for government, military, police, and civil officials

A separate format exists for private vehicles belonging to government, military or police officials. Because most of these agencies are based in Jakarta, vehicles belonging to state officials use the B suffix, along with the four numbers that are assigned to the vehicle. The sub-area suffix is replaced with RF suffix code, indicating the vehicle belongs to a state official, followed by another letter that indicates the corresponding agency or institution of the state official.

- RFS - Vehicle registration code intended for civil officials.
  - RFO, RFH, and RFQ suffixes are intended for civil officials under the Echelon 2 rank role.
- RFT - Vehicle registration code intended for Indonesian National Armed Forces
- RFD - Vehicle registration code intended for Indonesian Army officials.
- RFL - Vehicle registration code intended for Indonesian Navy officials.
- RFU - Vehicle registration code intended for Indonesian Air Force officials.
- RFP - Vehicle registration code intended for Indonesian National Police officials.

For example, B 1703 RFS indicates that the vehicle belongs to a civilian official, whilst B 1148 RFP indicates that the vehicle belongs to a police official.

On 27 January 2023, the Traffic Corps of the Indonesian National Police announced that special RF plates would be discontinued in October 2023, due to often being misused by numbers of people. By July 2023, the special RF plates has been replaced by ZZ plates (not to be confused with the vehicle registration number for Depok city, which has a format B **** Z**).

The application of the ZZ* plates first introduced in Riau Islands province in May 2023.

== Special plate designs ==
=== Military and police vehicles ===
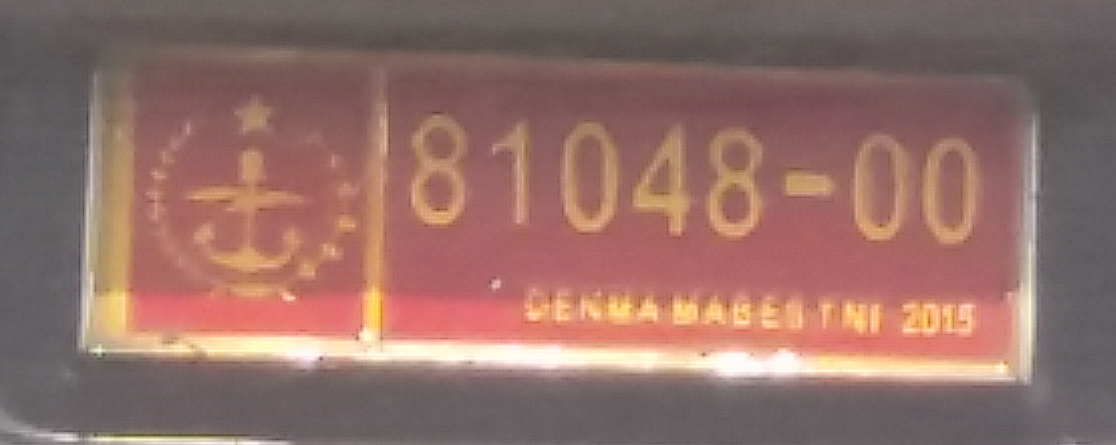
The Indonesian National Armed Forces Headquarter Detachment Plate.

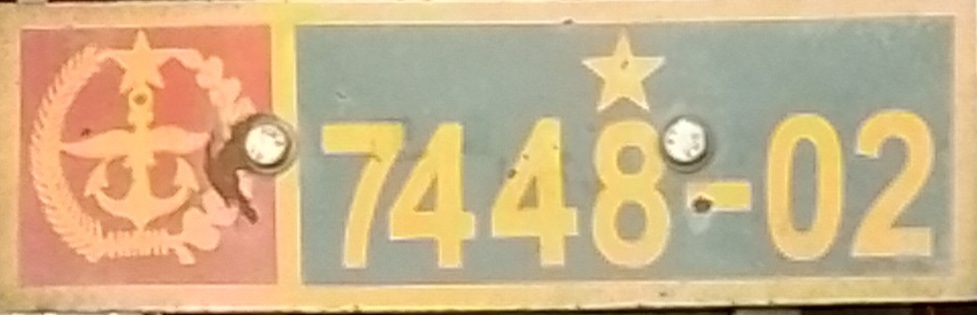
The Indonesian Army plate, with "-02" suffix code indicates the Army's Special Forces Command

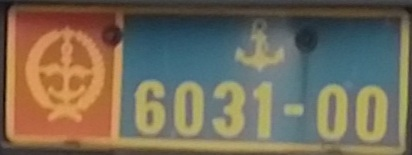
The Navy plate

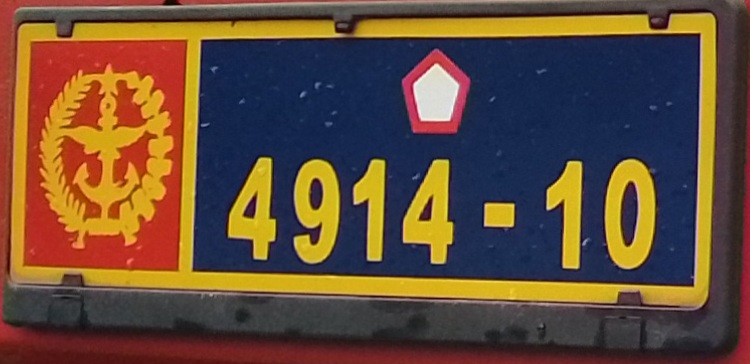
The Air Force plate, with "-10" suffix code indicates the Air Force's Quick Reaction Forces Command

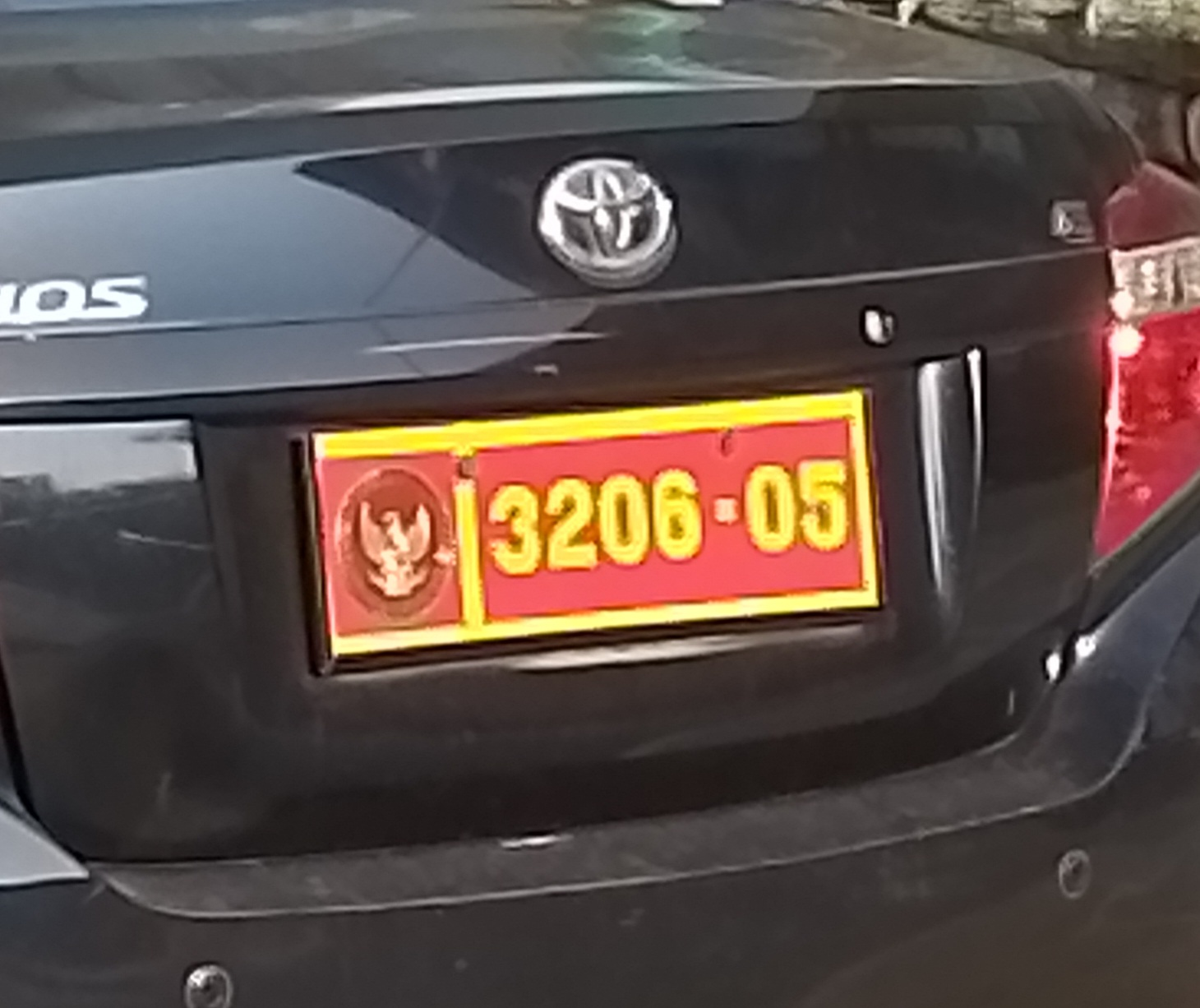
A Toyota Vios with the Indonesian Ministry of Defense plate. The "-05" suffix indicates the Ministry of Defense's Directorate General of Materials, Facilities and Services.

Military and police vehicles have their own colors and alpha-numeric conventions, including their insignia and/or the rank of the officer owning the vehicle, especially for high-ranking officers.

Army-personnel vehicles are yellow on green background, plus a yellow star on the top. Navy-personnel plate is yellow on light blue, plus a yellow anchor. Air Force-personnel plate is yellow on dark blue, plus a red and white air force roundel. Police plate is yellow on black. Personnel in Armed Forces Headquarters uses yellow numbers on red background plates. Slightly similar, Ministry of Defense vehicles also uses yellow on red plates, only replacing Armed Forces' insignia with the Ministry's insignia. This is also being implemented on other military vehicles, such as motorcycles, jeeps, trucks, and tanks.

Military and Ministry of Defense vehicles use the numerical convention NNNNN-SS where "N" is for numbers from "0" to "9" for registration and "S" denotes a special suffix number/letter which denotes the type of office or unit in which the person who owns the vehicle belongs to.

The suffix codes are:

Armed Forces		Army		Navy		Air Force		Ministry of Defense		National Police	
Suffix	Department	Suffix	Department	Suffix	Department	Suffix	Department	Suffix	Department	Suffix	Department
00	Armed Forces Headquarters	00	Army Headquarters	00	Navy Headquarters	00	Air Force Headquarters	00	Ministry of Defense	00	National Police Headquarters
01	Staff and Command School	01	Army Strategic Reserve Command (KOSTRAD)	01	1st Fleet Command	01	1st Air Operations Command	02	National Defense Institute	I	Aceh Police Region
02	Military Academy	02	Army Special Forces Command (KOPASSUS)	02	2nd Fleet Command	02	2nd Air Operations Command	05	Directorate General of Materials, Facilities and Services	II	North Sumatra Police Region
09	Legal Development Agency	03	Military Regional Command (KODAM Jakarta Raya)	03	3rd Fleet Command	03	3rd Air Operations Command			III	West Sumatra Police Region
10	Military Supply Agency	04	Education & Training Command	04	Military Sealift Command	04	Material Maintenance Command			IV	Riau Police Region
14 or V	Presidential Security Force (PASPAMPRES)	05	Military Regional Command (KODAM Iskandar Muda)	05	Marine Corps	05	Doctrine, Education and Training Command			V	South Sumatra Police Region
		10	Army Academy	08	Command and Staff College	10	Quick Reaction Forces Command (KOPASGAT)			VI	West Kalimantan Police Region
		20	Command and Staff College	I-XIV	Main Naval Bases from 1–14					VII	Metro Jaya Police Region
		30	Army Territorial Center							VIII	West Java Police Region
		31	Infantry Armament Center							IX	Central Java Police Region
		32	Cavalry Armament Center							X	East Java Police Region
		33	Artillery Armament Center							XI	Bali Police Region
		34	Military Police Center							XII	East Kalimantan Police Region
		41	Directorate of Engineers							XIII	South Kalimantan Police Region
		42	Directorate of Supplies and Transportation							XIV	South Sulawesi Police Region
		43	Directorate of Equipment							XV	North Sulawesi Police Region
		44	Directorate of Supplies and Transportation							XVI	Maluku Police Region
		45	Directorate of Health							XVII	Papua Police Region
		46	Directorate of the Adjutant General							XVIII	Central Kalimantan Police Region
		47	Directorate of Topography							XIX	Central Sulawesi Police Region
		48	Directorate of Finance							XX	Southeast Sulawesi Police Region
		49	Directorate of Law							XXI	West Nusa Tenggara Police Region
		51	Information Service							XXII	East Nusa Tenggara Police Region
		52	Mental Development Service							XXIII	Banten Police Region
		53	Psychology Service							XXIV	Yogyakarta Special Region Police Region
		54	Research and Development Service							XXV	Lampung Police Region
		55	Information and Data Processing Service							XXVI	Jambi Police Region
		56	Aviation Service							XXVII	Bengkulu Police Region
		I-XVIII	Military Area Commands from 1–18							XXVIII	Bangka Belitung Islands Police Region
										XXIX	Gorontalo Police Region
										XXX	North Maluku Police Region
										XXXI	Riau Islands Police Region
										XXXII	West Papua Police Region
										XXXIII	West Sulawesi Police Region
										XXXV	North Kalimantan Police Region

=== Government officials ===
==== Executive branch ====
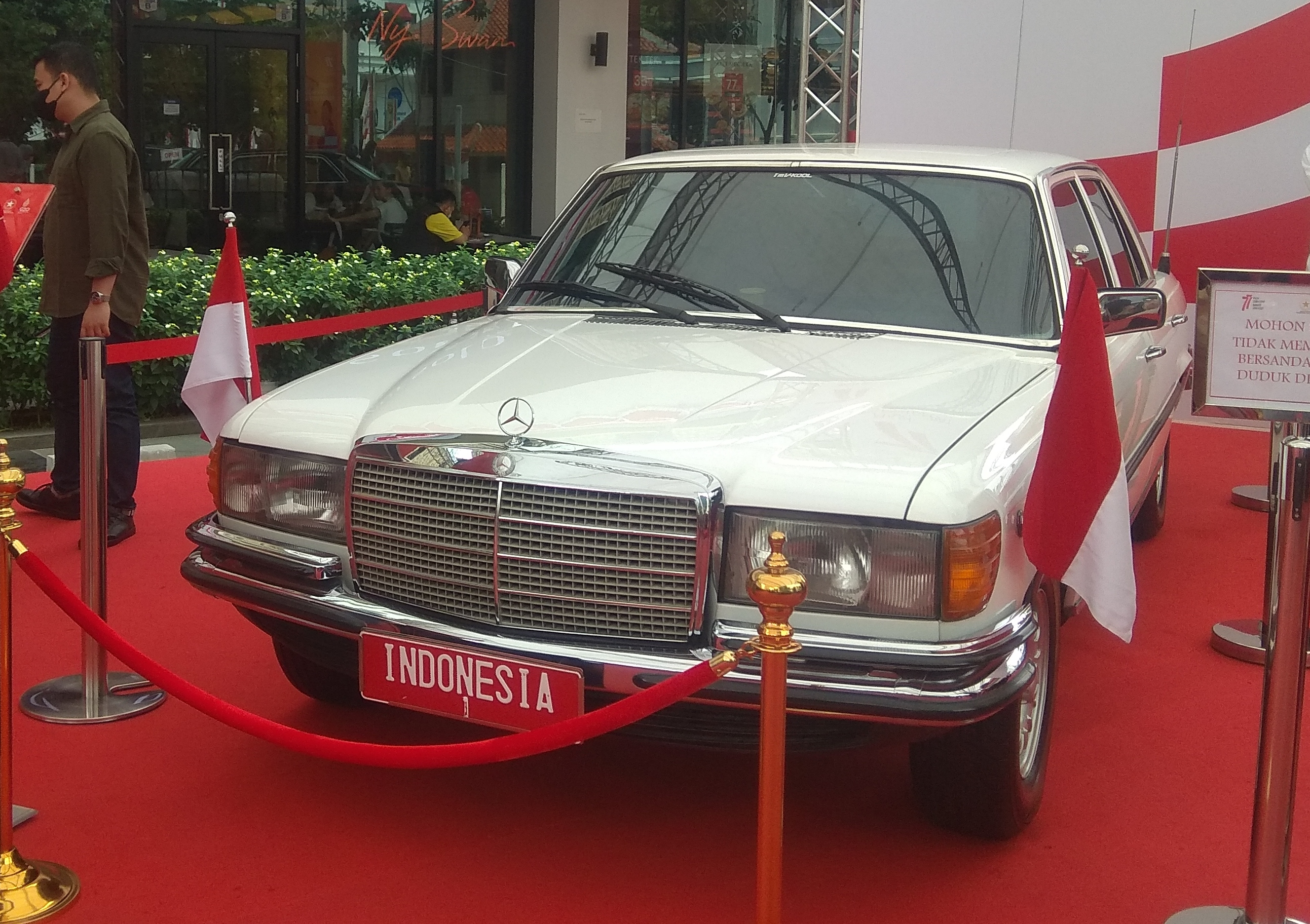
A Mercedes-Benz W116 with the INDONESIA 1 plate. The car was used by former Presidents Suharto, B. J. Habibie, and Abdurrahman Wahid.

Vehicle registration plates belonging to senior government officials like the president or vice president always begins with RI which stands for Republik Indonesia and are followed by a number. For example, the president's registration plate is RI-1, and the vice president's is RI-2. Other senior officials such as government ministers, the chairman of the House of Representatives, the commander of the National Armed Forces and the chief of the National Police also share the same convention and are assigned the numbers after the President and vice president. These plates are used for everyday activities and have a black on white design.

There are some very special numbers, which are INDONESIA 1 and INDONESIA 2 for the president and vice president, respectively. These numbers are used for ceremonial purposes, such as presidential/vice-presidential inaugurations, national day ceremonies and armed forces day. On inauguration day, at the time the new president and vice president take the oath, the plates are moved from the former presidential/vice-presidential cars to the new car. These numbers are also used for all ceremonial presidential/vice-presidential cars, and have a white-on-red design.

Code	Officeholder
RI 1 or INDONESIA 1	President of Indonesia
RI 2 or INDONESIA 2	Vice President of Indonesia
RI 3	The First Lady
RI 4	The Second Lady
RI 5	Chairman of the People's Consultative Assembly
RI 6	Speaker of the House of Representatives
RI 7	Speaker of the Regional Representative Council
RI 8	Chief Justice of the Supreme Court
RI 9	Chief Justice of the Constitutional Court
RI 10	Chief of the Audit Board
RI 11	Chief of the Judicial Commission
RI 12	Governor of Bank Indonesia
RI 13	Chief of the Financial Services Authority
RI 14	Minister of State Secretariat
RI 15	Coordinating Minister for Politic, Legal and Security Affairs
RI 16	Coordinating Minister for Economic Affairs
RI 17	Coordinating Minister for Human Development and Cultural Affairs
RI 18	Coordinating Minister for Maritime and Investment Affairs
RI 19	Minister of Home Affairs
RI 21	Minister of Foreign Affairs
RI 22	Minister of Defense
RI 23	Minister of Religious Affairs
RI 24	Minister of Law and Human Rights
RI 25	Minister of Finance
RI 26	Minister of Education, Culture, Research, and Technology
RI 29	Minister of Social Affairs
RI 30	Minister of Manpower
RI 31	Minister of Industry
RI 32	Minister of Trade
RI 33	Minister of Energy and Mineral Resources
RI 34	Minister of Public Works and Housing
RI 35	Minister of Maritime Affairs and Fisheries
RI 36	Minister of Communication and Informatics
RI 37	Minister of Agriculture
RI 38	Minister of Environment and Forestry
RI 40	Minister of Villages, Development of Disadvantaged Regions, and Transmigration
RI 41	Minister of Agrarian Affairs and Spatial Planning/Chief of the National Land Agency
RI 42	Minister of National Development Planning/Chief of the National Development Planning Agency
RI 43	Minister of State Apparatus Utilization and Bureaucratic Reform
RI 44	Minister of State-Owned Enterprises
RI 45	Minister of Cooperatives and Small & Medium Enterprises
RI 48	Minister of Youth and Sports
RI 53	Deputy Speakers of the House of Representatives

==== Public Prosecution Service ====
The Public Prosecution Service of Indonesia (Indonesian: Kejaksaan Republik Indonesia) uses a special vehicle registration plate format for its official fleet, regulated through a regulation issued by the Attorney General. The plate consists of three primary elements: the emblem positioned on the left, a registration number sequence, and a two-character regional code placed at the end. The regional code, which indicates the vehicle’s registration area, may be written in either Arabic or Roman numerals. The plates use a distinctive color scheme: the section behind the emblem is dark green, the area containing the registration number is dark brown, and the main background is golden yellow.

==== Legislative branch ====
In May 2021, the Indonesian House of Representatives (Indonesian: Dewan Perwakilan Rakyat) introduced their owned special registration plates, in order to supervise their member's driving behavior. The plate design is similar to the Ministry of Defence's plate, but painted in black and white combination with the seal of the House of Representatives. The codes are:

Code	Division
1-00	Speaker of the House of Representatives
2-00 to 5-00	Deputy Speakers of the House of Representatives
6-xx	Faction Leaders
7-xx	Faction Secretaries
8-xx	Faction Treasurers
xx-01	PDI-P faction
xx-02	Golkar faction
xx-03	Gerindra faction
xx-04	NasDem faction
xx-05	PKB faction
xx-06	Demokrat faction
xx-07	PKS faction
xx-08	PAN faction
xx-09	PPP faction
6-I to 6-XI	Chief of Commission I – XI
7-I to 7-XI	Deputy Chief of Commission I – XI
xx-XII	House of Representatives Honor Court
xx-XIII	Legislation Agency
xx-XIV	Inter-parliament Cooperation Agency
xx-XV	Household Affairs Agency
xx-XVI	Budget Agency
xx-XVII	State Financial Accountability Agency
6-XVIII	General Secretariat
7-XVIII	Expertise Agency
8-XVIII	Deputy of Assembly
9-XVIII	Deputy of Administration
10-XVII	Main Inspector
11-XVII	Chief of General Bureau

For members of the parliament, the format is xx-yy where xx is the member number and yy is the faction number.

=== Foreign countries and international organizations ===
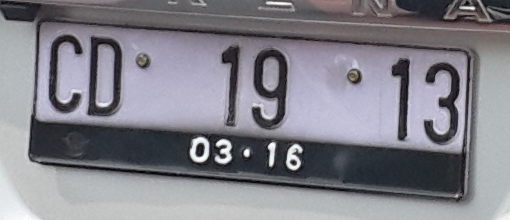
An Indonesian diplomatic plate on a vehicle owned by the Norwegian embassy in Jakarta

Registration plates for vehicles belonging to the government of foreign countries or international organizations follow a different convention. They used to have black letters on a white background with black trim on the bottom. In June 2022, the black trim was scrapped, so the plates would look similar to regular personal vehicle plates.

The plates have the letter CD (abbreviation of Corps Diplomatique, French for Diplomatic Corps) followed by two or three digits denoting the country or organization, followed by up to three digits of the serial number. For example, a car with number CD 66 88 is owned by Vietnam. Generally, the number 01 is reserved for an ambassador's official vehicle.

The order of numbers is based on when they recognized Indonesia as a country. The United States was originally assigned CD 13; due to the stigma associated with the number 13, they asked the Indian delegation to exchange numbers.

The list of countries and organizations follows:

Code	Country/organization
CD 12	United States
CD 13	India
CD 14	France
CD 15	United Kingdom
CD 16	Philippines
CD 17	Vatican City
CD 18	Australia
CD 19	Norway
CD 20	Iraq
CD 21	Pakistan
CD 22	Belgium
CD 23	Myanmar
CD 24	United Arab Emirates
CD 25	China
CD 26	Sweden
CD 27	Saudi Arabia
CD 28	Thailand
CD 29	Egypt
CD 30	Italy
CD 31	Switzerland
CD 32	Germany
CD 33	Sri Lanka
CD 34	Denmark
CD 35	Canada
CD 36	Brazil
CD 37	Russia
CD 38	Afghanistan
CD 39	Serbia
CD 40	Czech Republic
CD 41	Finland
CD 42	Mexico
CD 43	Hungary
CD 44	Poland
CD 45	Iran
CD 47	Malaysia
CD 48	Turkey
CD 49	Japan
CD 50	Bulgaria
CD 51	Cambodia
CD 52	Argentina
CD 53	Romania
CD 54	Greece
CD 55	Jordan
CD 56	Austria
CD 57	Syria
CD 58	UNDP
CD 59	New Zealand
CD 60	Netherlands
CD 61	Yemen
CD 62	Universal Postal Union
CD 63	Portugal
CD 64	Algeria
CD 65	North Korea
CD 66	Vietnam
CD 67	Singapore
CD 68	Spain
CD 69	Bangladesh
CD 70	Panama
CD 71	UNICEF
CD 72	UNESCO
CD 73	Food and Agriculture Organization
CD 74	World Health Organization
CD 75	South Korea
CD 76	Asian Development Bank
CD 77	World Bank
CD 78	International Monetary Fund
CD 79	International Labour Organization
CD 80	Papua New Guinea
CD 81	Nigeria
CD 82	Chile
CD 83	UNHCR
CD 84	WFP
CD 85	Venezuela
CD 86	ESCAP
CD 87	Colombia
CD 88	Brunei Darussalam
CD 89	UNIC
CD 90	International Finance Corporation
CD 92	Permanent Mission of Indonesia for ASEAN
CD 93	Fiji
CD 94	Belarus
CD 95	Kazakhstan
CD 96	UNIDO
CD 97	Red Cross
CD 98	Morocco
CD 99	European Union
CD 100	ASEAN Headquarters
CD 101	Tunisia
CD 102	Kuwait
CD 103	Laos
CD 104	Palestine
CD 105	Cuba
CD 106	AIPO
CD 107	Libya
CD 108	Peru
CD 109	Slovakia
CD 110	Sudan
CD 111	ASEAN Foundation
CD 112	UTUSAN
CD 113	CIFOR
CD 114	Bosnia and Herzegovina
CD 115	Lebanon
CD 116	South Africa
CD 117	Croatia
CD 118	Ukraine
CD 120	Uzbekistan
CD 121	Qatar
CD 122	UNFPA
CD 123	Mozambique
CD 125	East Timor
CD 126	Suriname
CD 127	Ecuador
CD 128	Zimbabwe
CD 129	International Organization for Migration
CD 130	Azerbaijan
CD 131	Somalia
CD 132	Georgia
CD 134	Oman
CD 135	Armenia
CD 136	Bahrain
CD 137	Mongolia
CD 138	San Marino
CD 139	Ireland
CD 140	United Nations Office for Coordination of Reducing Emissions from Deforestation and Forest Degradation in Indonesia (UNORCID)
CD 141	Islamic Development Bank
CD 143	Ethiopia
CD 144	Solomon Islands
CD 145	International Fund for Agricultural Development

Consulates also use the same format but instead of using the letters CD, they use CC.

Some foreign countries and international-organization vehicles in Jakarta use the B xxxxx ^{yyy} format and a normal white on black plate. Where xxxxx stands for five random digits, and ^{yyy} stands for the country or organization code.

== Vanity plates ==
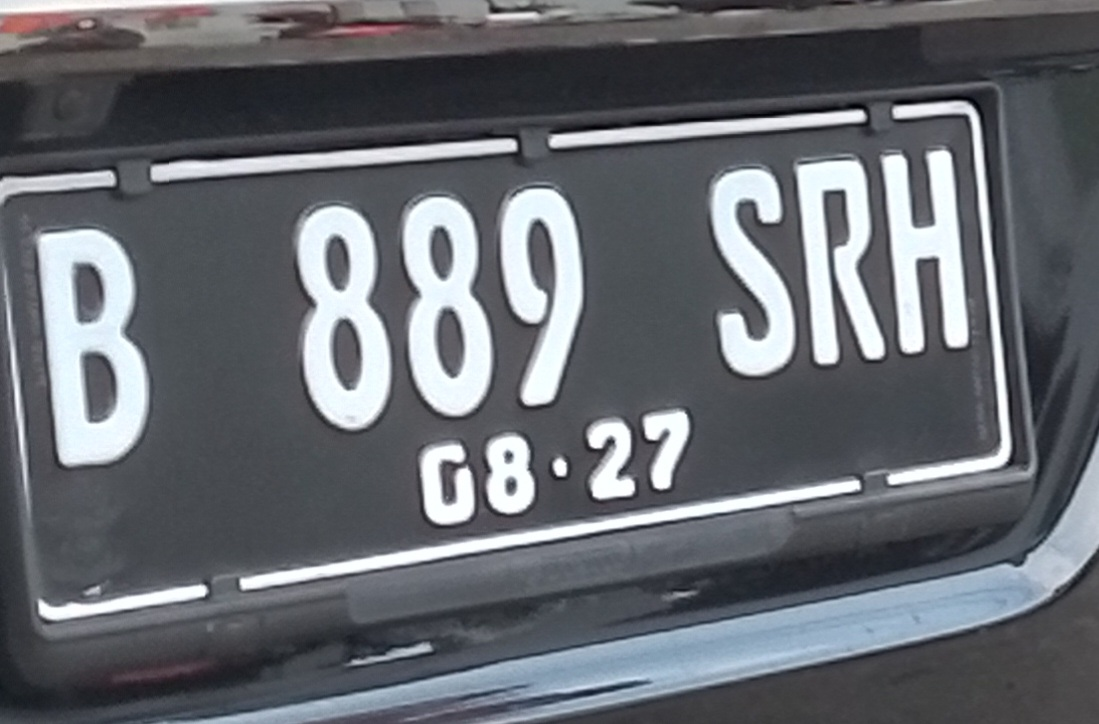
An example of a vanity plate in Indonesia using the FE-Schrift typeface since 2019

A few vehicle owners pay an extra amount of money to get a certain plate as their desire. An option for customized registration plate is available, with these plates being officially called as "Beautiful Number Plates" (Indonesian: Plat Nomor Cantik). Prices vary depending on how many numerical digits a plate will have and if there are letters after the number. These "vanity" plates are no different from regular plates in terms of format, and are simply regular plates sold at a higher value.

Because the convention is not flexible to include a full word, people try creative uses of numbers and letters. For example, Idris Sardi, a violin player, uses (B 10 LA) for his vehicle. It is a play on the word BIOLA which means "violin" in Indonesian. Leoni, a famous actress and singer, uses L 30 NI for her car. Even the former president Megawati Soekarnoputri chooses "M 3 GA" for her personal vehicle, as the plate resembles her broadly known nickname. Edhie Bhaskoro Yudhoyono, former president Yudhoyono's younger son, has "B 24 EB", which "EB" is being his name initial. With the new format of three suffix alphabets, many vanity or personal registration plates are possible to be created. For example, a Toyota Fortuner owner may choose the plate B 42 NER which sounds like B four-two-NER. Syahrini, an Indonesian singer, has "B 1 SYR" as her registration plate number, with "SYR" being her initials.

== See also ==
- Driving license in Indonesia
