= Ahmad Riza Patria =

Indonesian politician (born 1969)

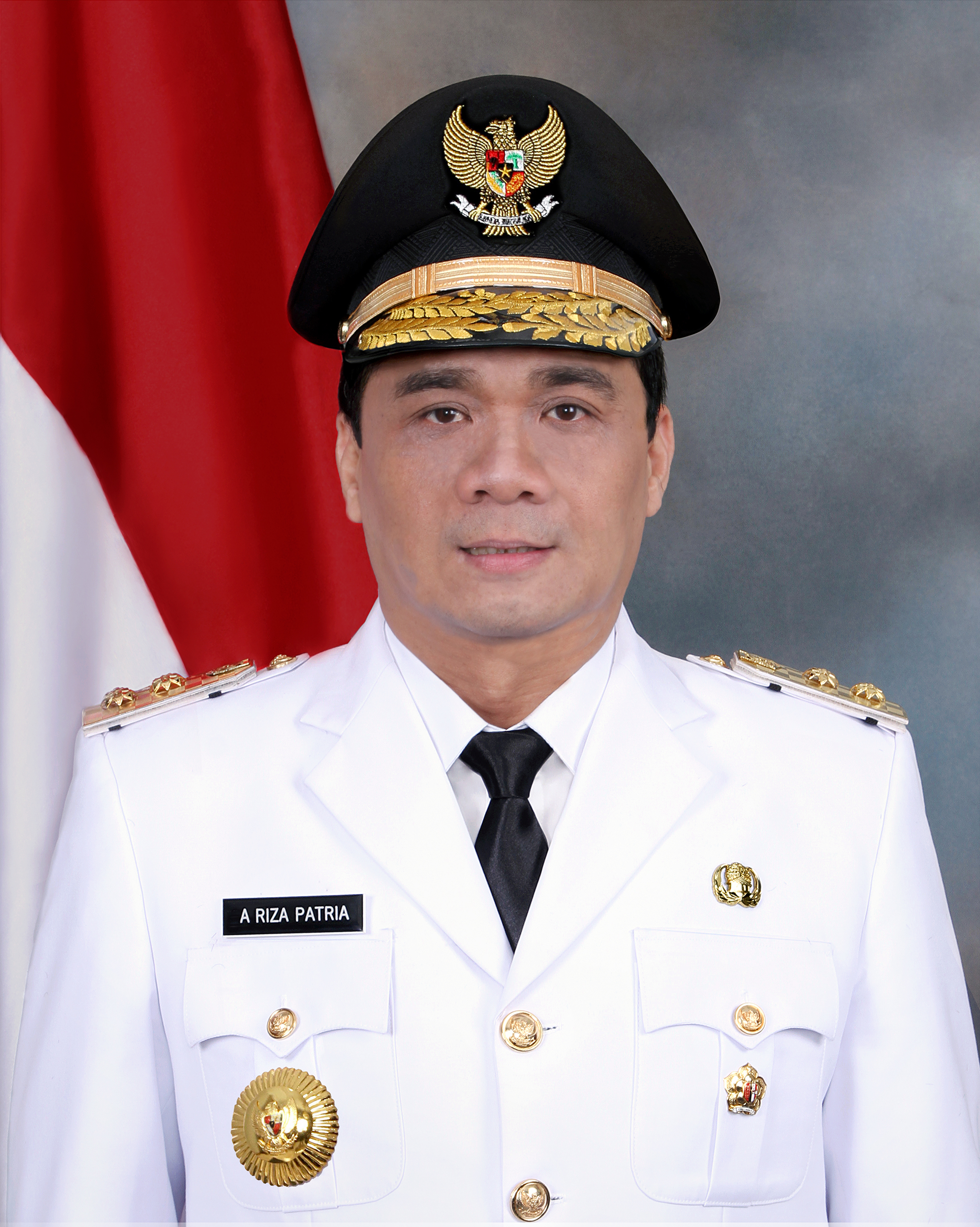

Deputy Minister of Villages and Development of Disadvantaged Regions
- Incumbent
- Assumed office 21 October 2024
- President: Prabowo Subianto
- Minister: Yandri Susanto
- Preceded by: Budi Arie Setiadi

Vice Governor of Jakarta
- In office 15 April 2020 – 16 October 2022
- Governor: Anies Baswedan
- Preceded by: Sandiaga Uno
- Succeeded by: Rano Karno

Other roles
- 2003–2008: Member of Regional Elections Commission of Jakarta

Faction represented in People's Representative Council
- 2014–2020: Gerindra Party

Personal details
- Born: 17 December 1969 (age 56) Banjarmasin, South Kalimantan, Indonesia
- Party: Gerindra
- Spouse: Ellisa Sumarlin
- Children: 3
- Parents: Amidhan Shaberah (father); Hj. Rasyidah (mother)
- Relatives: Ahmad Ridha Sabana (brother)
- Website: www.arizapatria.id

Ahmad Riza Patria (born 17 December 1969) is an Indonesian politician who served as the Deputy Minister of Villages and Development of Disadvantaged Regions. He previously served as a Vice Chairman of Second Commission in the People's Representative Council of Indonesia. He was elected in the seat of West Java V constituency winning with a total vote of 23,991 in the 2014 legislative elections.

== Career ==
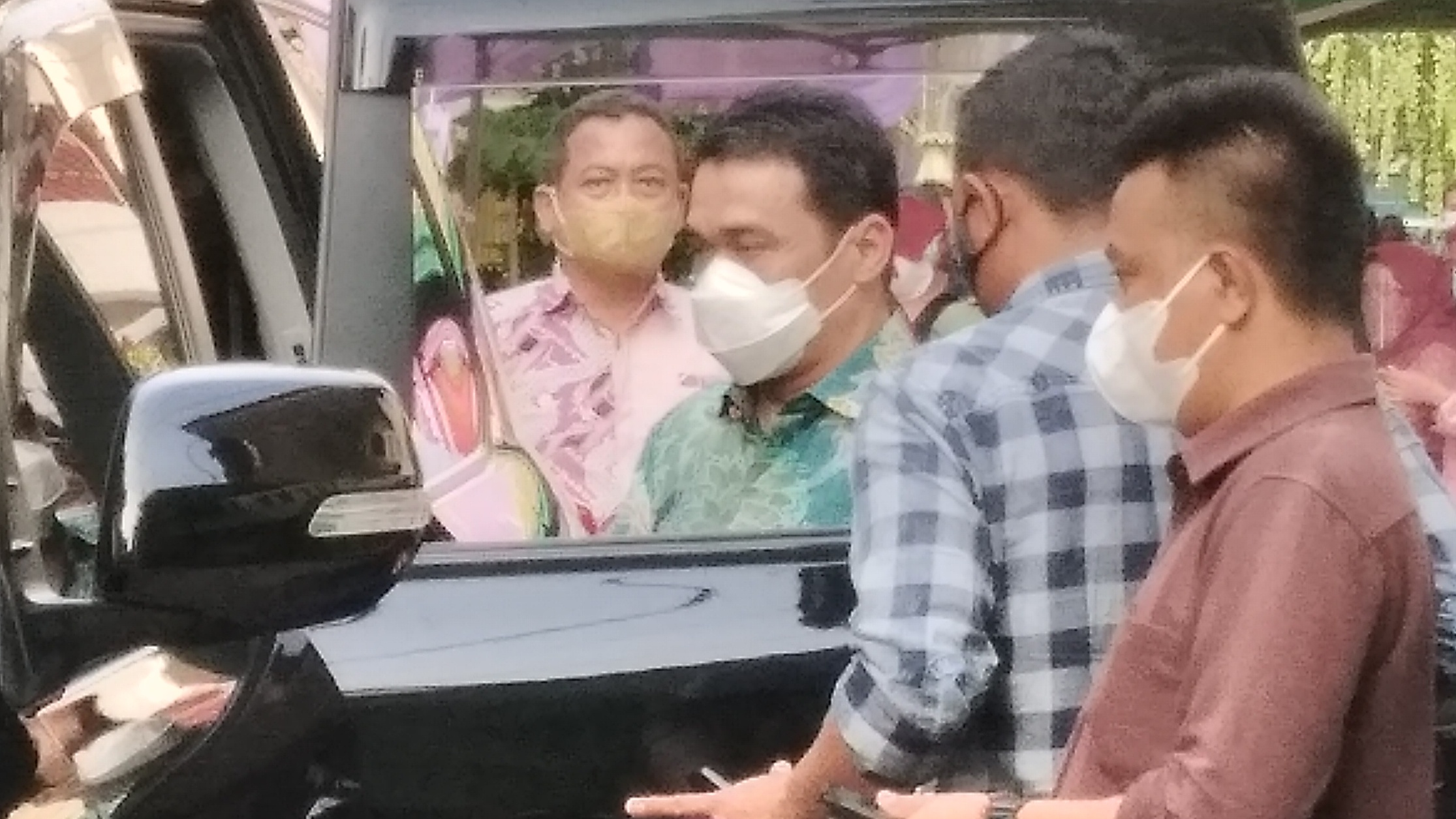
Ahmad Riza Patria (2nd from left) entering a car.

In 2012, Patria was the running mate of Hendardji Supandji as Deputy Governor during the Jakarta gubernatorial elections in 2012. Previously he was the chairman of the National Youth Council in Indonesia from 1999 to 2002. In 2002, he was re-elected to serve as chairman of the KNPI in Jakarta. Ahmad Patria is a graduate from the ISTN - National Institute of Science and Technology.

In 2018, Patria was appointed the Spokesperson for presidential candidate Prabowo Subianto Djojohadikusumo. He is also the current Chairman of Gerindra Party central board.

On 6 April 2020, Patria was voted to take on the role of the once vacant Deputy Governor of DKI Jakarta, after winning the vote in the Jakarta DPRD with 81 out of 100 cast votes.

== Personal life ==
On 29 November 2020, Patria was confirmed positive for COVID-19.
