= Faisal Basri =

Indonesian economist and politician (1959–2024)

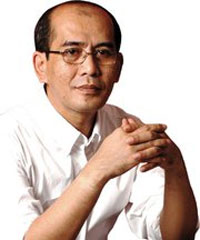
- Basri in 2012
- Born: 6 November 1959; Bandung, Indonesia
- Died: 5 September 2024 (aged 64); Jakarta, Indonesia
- Spouse: Syahfitri Nasution
- Relatives: Adam Malik (grandfather)

Academic background
- Education: University of Indonesia; Vanderbilt University

Academic work
- Discipline: Economics
- Website: faisalbasri.com

Faisal Basri (6 November 1959 – 5 September 2024) was an Indonesian economist and politician. He was a faculty member at University of Indonesia, specializing in political economics, and a member of KPPU, Indonesian competition regulator. Basri was the grandnephew of Indonesia's third Vice President, Adam Malik.

In 2012, Basri ran for governor in the Jakarta gubernatorial election as independent along with Biem Benyamin, the son of a prominent Betawi figure, Benyamin Sueb, but he was unsuccessful in winning the governorship, with fewer votes than Joko Widodo, Fauzi Bowo, and Hidayat Nur Wahid, and ahead of Alex Noerdin and Hendarji Supanji.

== Early life and education ==
Basri was born in Bandung, West Java on 6 November 1959 to Hasan Basri and Saidah Nasution. His family moved to Jakarta in 1966 after his father got a job in a printing company in Setiabudi, South Jakarta.

He obtained his degree in economics in 1985 from University of Indonesia. Basri completed his MA at Vanderbilt University in 1988.

== Death ==
Basri died from heart disease at Mayapada Hospital in Jakarta, on 5 September 2024. He was 64.
