= Ferry Juliantono =

Indonesian politician (born 1967)

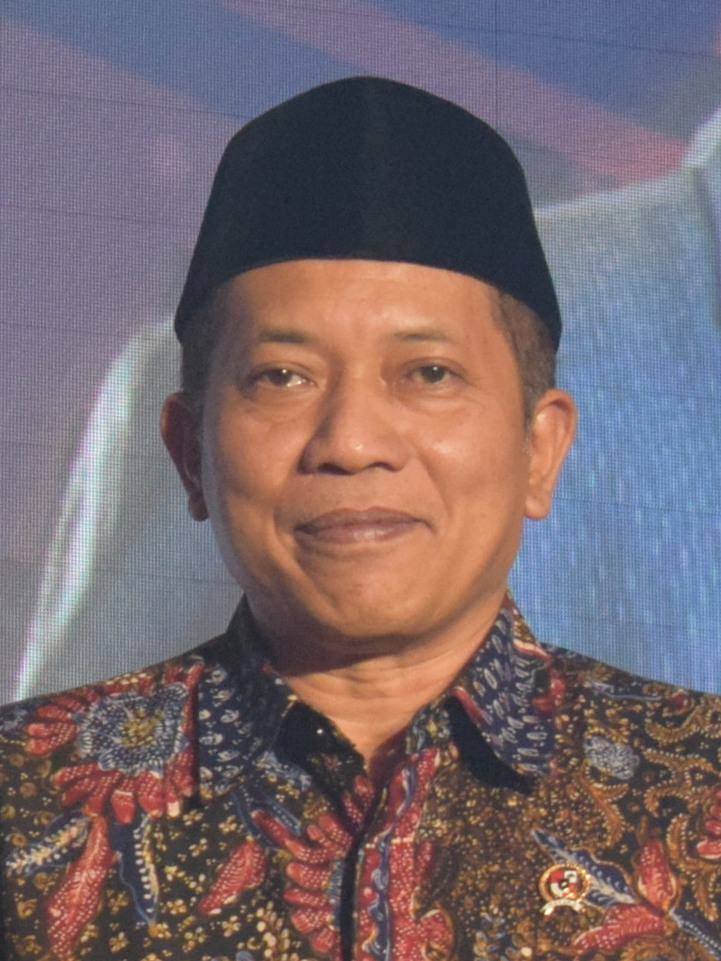
- Ferry Juliantono in 2025

Minister of Cooperatives
- Incumbent
- Assumed office 8 September 2025
- President: Prabowo Subianto
- Deputy: Farida Faricha
- Preceded by: Budi Arie Setiadi

2nd Deputy Minister of Cooperatives
- In office 21 October 2024 – 8 September 2025
- President: Prabowo Subianto
- Minister: Budi Arie Setiadi
- Preceded by: Bustanil Arifin
- Succeeded by: Farida Faricha

Personal details
- Born: 27 July 1967 (age 58) Jakarta, Indonesia
- Party: Gerindra
- Spouse: Ir. Sita Komaladewi
- Children: 2

Ferry Juliantono (born 27 July 1967) is an Indonesian politician serving as minister of cooperatives since 2025. From 2024 to 2025, he served as deputy minister of cooperatives.
