= Eko Putro Sandjojo =

Indonesian Minister

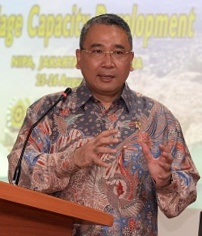
- Eko Putro Sandjojo in 2016

Minister of Villages, Development of Disadvantaged Regions and Transmigration
- In office 27 July 2016 – 20 October 2019
- President: Joko Widodo
- Preceded by: Marwan Jafar
- Succeeded by: Abdul Halim Iskandar

Personal details
- Born: 21 May 1962 (age 63) Jakarta, Indonesia
- Party: National Awakening Party

Eko Putro Sandjojo (born 21 May 1965 in Jakarta) is an Indonesian politician. He was the Minister of Villages, Development of Disadvantaged Regions, and Transmigration in the Working Cabinet in Indonesia. He was appointed Minister on 27 July 2016 by Joko Widodo and until on 20 October 2019.

He is a graduate from the Jakarta State Polytechnic. Sandjojo holds a degree in Electrical engineering from the University of Kentucky which he obtained in 1991. In 1993, he also obtained a Masters from the Indonesia Institute for Management Development IPMI Business School.

In July 2016, he was appointed Minister of Villages, Disadvantaged Regions and Transmigration by President Joko Widodo.

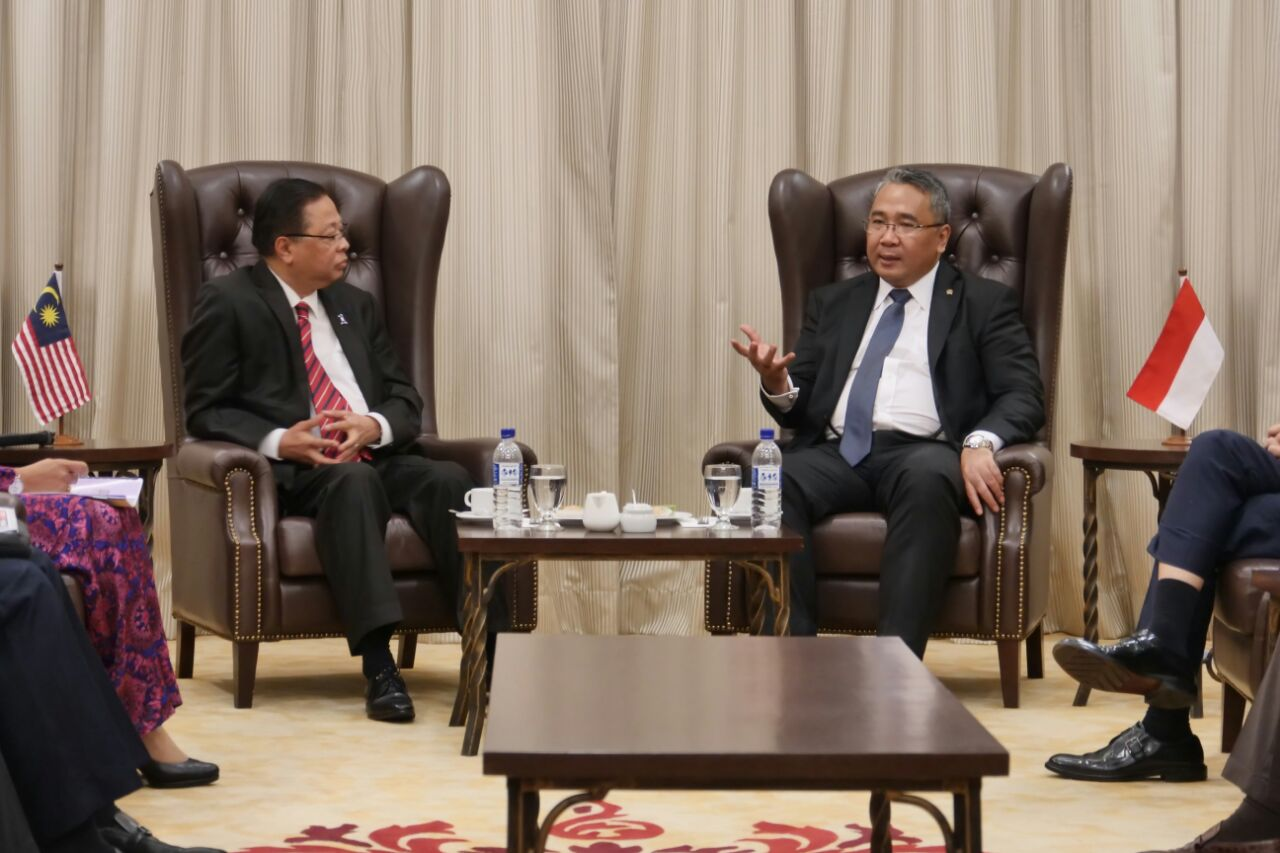
Eko Putro Sandjojo and Ismail Sabri Yaakob in Kuala Lumpur, Malaysia on April 4, 2018
