= 2012 Jakarta gubernatorial election =

- 11 July 2012 (first round); 20 September 2012 (second round)
- Turnout: 63.62% (▼1.79pp) (first round); 66.71% (▲3.09pp) (second round)
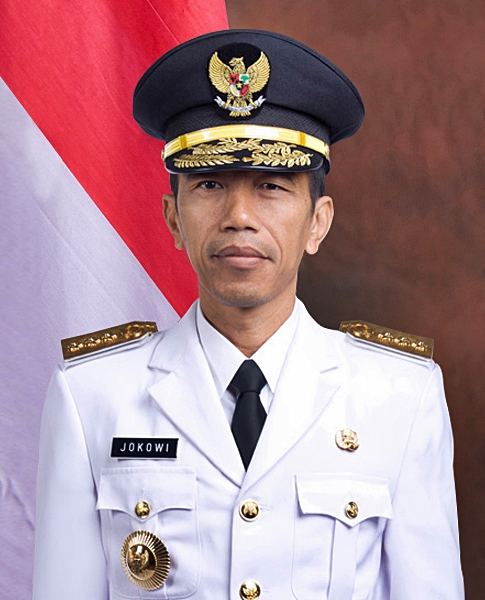

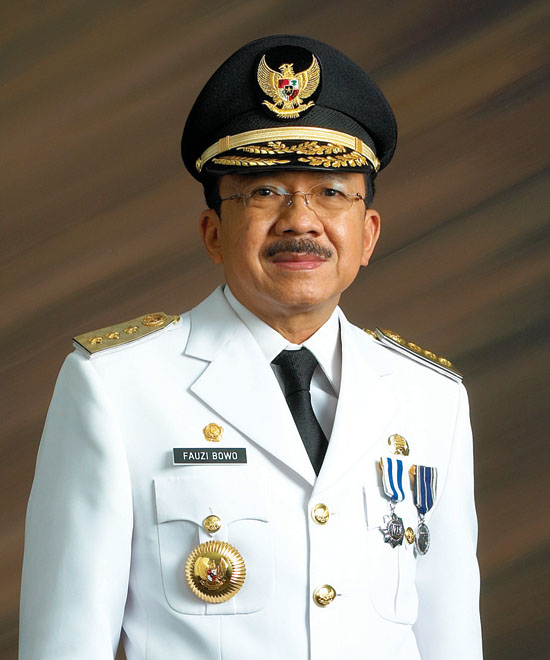
Candidate	Joko Widodo	Fauzi Bowo
Party	PDI-P	Demokrat
Alliance	Gerindra	PKB, PAN, Hanura
Running mate	Basuki Tjahaja Purnama	Nachrowi Ramli
Popular vote	2,472,130	2,120,815
Percentage	53.82%	46.18%
Governor before election
Fauzi Bowo
Demokrat
Elected Governor
Joko Widodo
PDI-P

General elections were held on 11 July and 20 September 2012 in Jakarta to elect the governor of Jakarta for a five-year term. Incumbent governor Fauzi Bowo was running for a second successive term.

The first round resulted with two top-voted candidates, Joko Widodo and Fauzi Bowo to advance to the runoff as neither received majority of votes in the first round. Quick count results released in mass media after the second round voting indicated that Joko Widodo is projected to win the runoff with 54% of popular votes. Fauzi Bowo later conceded and congratulated Joko on 17.00 WIB. Official results were announced on 29 September. Widodo won the election with 53.82% of votes against Bowo's 46.18%.

== Candidates ==
Under regulations, only political parties having 15 seats or more in the regional parliament (DPRD) can put forward a candidate. Political parties with fewer seats can put forward a candidate only if they have acquired support from other political parties. Independent candidates are able to run if they have gathered at least 407,340 signatures from local residents, which will be verified by the local election committee.

Candidates that declared their candidacy:

- Fauzi Bowo, running with Nachrowi Ramli, endorsed by Demokrat, PKB, PAN, Hanura, plus a faction in PDS.
- Joko Widodo, running with Basuki Tjahaja Purnama, endorsed by PDI-P and Gerindra.
- Alex Noerdin, running with Nono Sampono, endorsed by Golkar, PPP, and a faction in PDS.
- Hidayat Nur Wahid, running with Didik Rachbini, endorsed by PKS.
- Faisal Basri, running with Biem Benyamin, independent candidate.
- Hendarji Supanji, running with Ahmad Riza Patria, independent candidate.

Parties endorsing Noerdin and Nur Wahid in the first round later gave their support to Fauzi in the second round.

== Campaign and issues ==
While the campaign for the elections had been mostly peaceful, there were a wide range of issues carried into the campaign. Notable ones including traffic management, flood control, accusation of money politics by some candidates, electoral roll irregularities, and smear campaign dominated the campaign.

=== Traffic management ===
Traffic has long become the main issue for many Jakartans. Traffic jams up to 3–5 hours happens during weekdays rush hour and frustrate many locals. Public transportation was also heavily lamented due to poor service and maintenance. All candidates in the race brought forward this issue and promised various approaches to this problem.

=== Money politics ===
Money politics is a problem that has marred the democratic process in Indonesia ever since the transition to democracy. There have been many cases of candidates giving money or other incentives to the electorate to influence their voting intention. In the first round of this election, anti-corruption NGO, Indonesia Corruption Watch found at least 27 cases of money politics during the campaign. The campaign of incumbent governor Fauzi Bowo was the main offender with 12 cases, followed by Alex Noerdin's campaign with 6 cases. The electoral commission was also deemed failed to avoid these cases to happen regularly.

=== Electoral roll irregularities ===
The electoral roll (Daftar Pemilih Tetap) had created much controversy since it was made public. The roll which approved by the electoral commission on June 2, was rejected by all candidates except the incumbent governor. Irregularities include double registrations, inclusion of deceased voters, fake names, or redundancy. Since then, all five candidates appealed the electoral commission to revise the electoral roll, and if necessary, postpone the election. The electoral commission mostly kept silent on this issue and promised to do some revision on the roll. The revision process was controversially ineffective and was heavily criticized. The head of the commission was reprimanded for this issue.

== Results ==
Turnout map by subdistrict in the first round

Turnout map by subdistrict in the second round

Candidate	Running mate	Party	First round		Second round	
Candidate	Running mate	Party	Votes	%	Votes	%
Joko Widodo	Basuki Tjahaja Purnama	Indonesian Democratic Party of Struggle	1,847,157	42.60	2,472,130	53.82
Fauzi Bowo	Nachrowi Ramli	Democratic Party	1,476,648	34.05	2,120,815	46.18
Hidayat Nur Wahid	Didik Rachbini	Prosperous Justice Party	508,113	11.72		
Faisal Basri	Biem Benyamin	Independent	215,935	4.98		
Alex Noerdin	Nono Sampono	Golkar	202,643	4.67		
Hendardji Supandji	Ahmad Riza Patria	Independent	85,990	1.98		
Total			4,336,486	100.00	4,592,945	100.00
Valid votes			4,336,486	97.90	4,592,945	98.39
Invalid/blank votes			93,047	2.10	74,996	1.61
Total votes			4,429,533	100.00	4,667,941	100.00
Registered voters/turnout			6,962,348	63.62	6,996,951	66.71
Source: First round (archived), Second round

Candidate vote share by subdistrict
Foke–Nara

Hendardji–Riza

Jokowi–Ahok

Hidayat–Didik

Faisal–Biem

Alex–Nono

=== First round ===
Preliminary results released by several media after first round of elections showed Joko Widodo leading with 43% of votes, followed by Fauzi Bowo with 33%, Hidayat Nur Wahid with 11%, Faisal Basri with 5%, Alex Noerdin with 4%, and Hendarji Supanji with 2%. Official results were released on 19 July. The result shocked many pollsters, as most have predicted Governor Fauzi to win the election in a landslide and without having to go for a runoff.

=== Second round ===
Quick count results released in mass media after the second round voting indicated that Joko Widodo is projected to win with 54% of popular votes. Fauzi Bowo congratulated Joko at 17.00 WIB. Official second round results were released on 29 September.
