= Biem Benyamin =

Indonesian politician and businessman

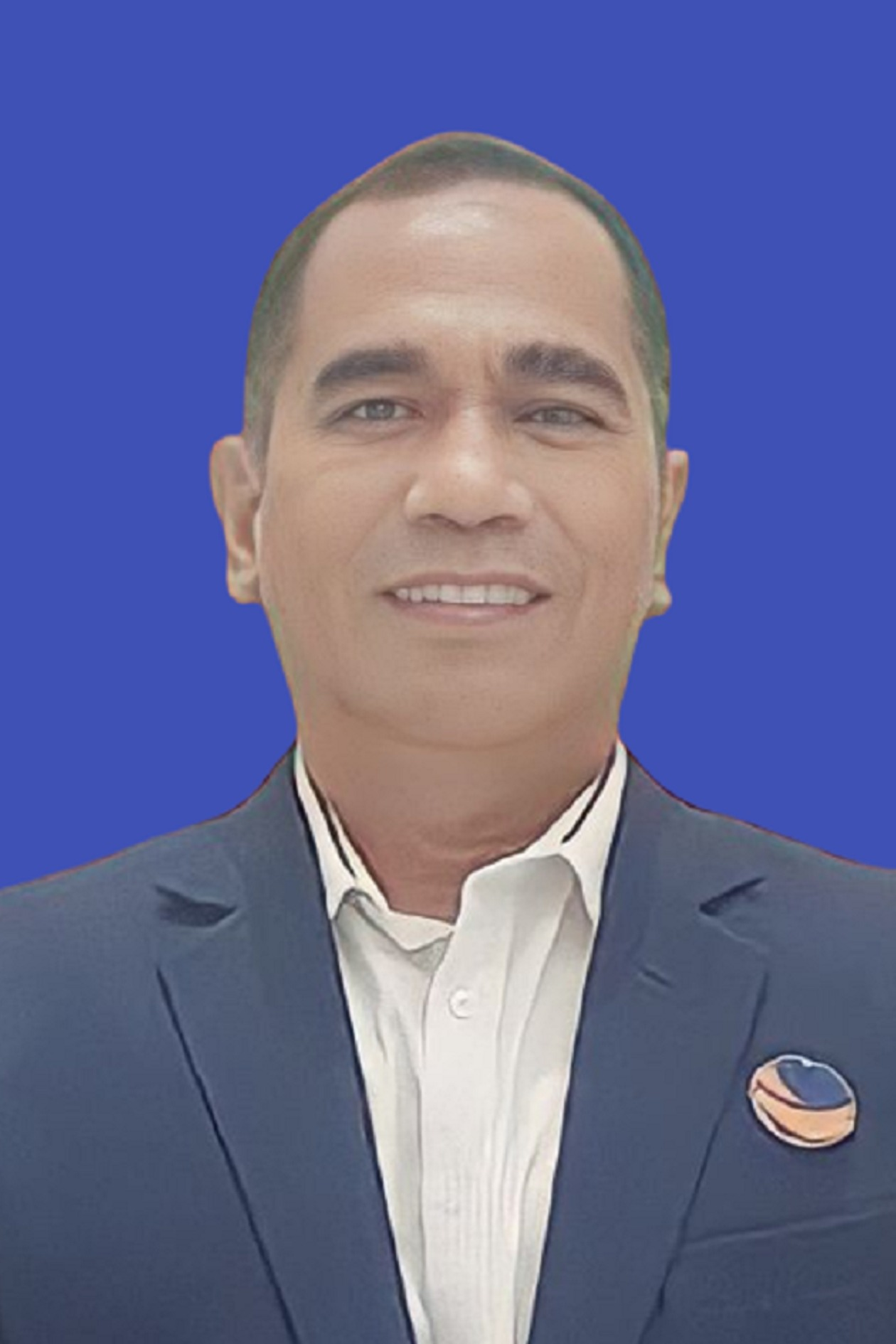
- Biem Triani Benyamin

Member of People's Representative Council
- Incumbent
- Assumed office 1 October 2014
- Constituency: Jakarta 2

Indonesian Senator from Jakarta
- In office 2004–2009

Personal details
- Born: Biem Triani Benyamin Sueb; 13 March 1964 (age 62) Jakarta
- Party: Golkar
- Spouse: Wahyuning Prihatini
- Parent(s): Benyamin Sueb; Noni
- Profession: Politician, businessman

Biem Triani Benyamin (born 13 March 1964) is an Indonesian politician and businessman. He was Indonesian senator from Jakarta, known for proposing a judicial review allowing independent candidates to run in regional elections. He also chaired the special committee in the parliament for revising the Jakarta Special Capital Region Government Act. Biem Benyamin is the third son of Benyamin Sueb, Betawi iconic figure. He was later elected into the People's Representative Council in 2014.

== Career ==
Before starting his career in politics, Biem Benyamin was active in advocating the development of Betawi culture including initiating the establishment of Kongres Rakyat Betawi (Indonesian: Betawi People Congress). As a businessman, Biem Benyamin owns a radio station, Bens Radio, which is popular in promoting Betawi culture and traditions. He also founded Etnikom Network, a network between fourteen radio stations in Java and Sumatra which actively promote local cultures.

In 2012, he ran in Jakarta gubernatorial election as vice gubernatorial candidate for independent gubernatorial candidate Faisal Basri.
