= Budi Arie Setiadi =

Indonesian politician

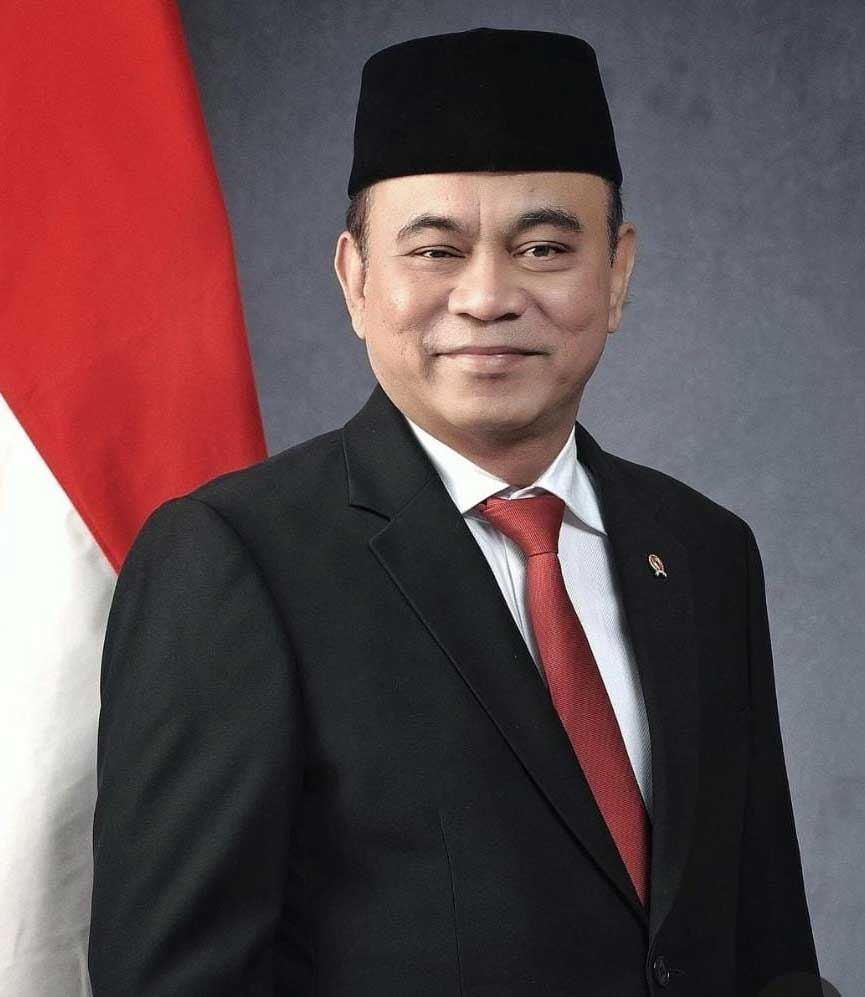
- Official portrait, 2024

Minister of Cooperatives
- In office 21 October 2024 – 8 September 2025
- President: Prabowo Subianto
- Deputy: Ferry Juliantono
- Preceded by: Teten Masduki (as Minister of Cooperatives and Small and Medium Enterprises)
- Succeeded by: Ferry Juliantono

7th Minister of Communications and Informatics
- In office 17 July 2023 – 20 October 2024
- President: Joko Widodo
- Deputy: Nezar Patria; Angga Raka Prabowo
- Preceded by: Johnny G. Plate; Mahfud MD (acting)
- Succeeded by: Meutya Hafid

Deputy Minister of Villages, Disadvantage Region, and Transmigration
- In office 25 October 2019 – 17 July 2023
- President: Joko Widodo
- Minister: Abdul Halim Iskandar
- Preceded by: Office established
- Succeeded by: Paiman Raharjo

Personal details
- Born: 20 April 1969 (age 57) Jakarta, Indonesia
- Party: Independent
- Spouse: Zara Murzandina
- Children: 2
- Education: University of Indonesia
- Occupation: Politician; businessman; journalist

Budi Arie Setiadi (born 20 April 1969) is an Indonesian politician who became the Minister of Communication and Informatics on 17 July 2023 until 20 October 2024 and serving as Minister of Cooperatives in the Red and White Cabinet of President Prabowo Subianto on 21 October 2024 until 8 September 2025. Setiadi became a minister after the previous minister, Johnny G. Plate was involved in a corruption case. Setiadi was previously the Deputy Minister of Villages, Development of Disadvantaged Regions, and Transmigration and a leading member of President Joko Widodo's campaign team in the 2014 and 2019 campaigns.

== Early life and education ==
=== Early life ===
Budi Arie Setiadi was born in Jakarta on 20 April 1969, the son of Joko Asmoro and Pudji Astuti. He grew up and spent most of his childhood in Jakarta. He began his formal education at the Fons Vitae II Elementary School in North Jakarta and graduated from the same school's junior high school. He then continued his education at Canisius College High School in Central Jakarta in 1988 and graduated in 1990. Upon completing high school, Budi began studying communications at the University of Indonesia.

=== Education ===
Budi participated in various student organizations, such as student press, sports communities, and student political organizations. He was nicknamed Muni during his time at the university. He served as Chairman of the Student Representative Council (BPM) of UI's Social and Political Sciences Faculty (FISIP) in 1994, as well as a presidium member of UI's student senate from 1994 until 1995. Budi was involved in establishing the UI Student Study Forum (FSM) and was actively involved in the UI Student Defender Group (KPM). In journalistics, Setiadi became the chief editor of UI's student magazine, Suara Mahasiswa, from 1993 until 1994.

Budi was also involved in organizing protests against the policies of UI's rector at that time. Budi's frequent appearance in protest caught the attention of his dean, who often asked him when he would graduate. He had already completed his classes by 1994, but it took him several years to complete his thesis. He eventually graduated and received a bachelor's degree in communication in 1996.

Budi continued his postgraduate studies in social development management at UI's Faculty of Economics and Business. He completed his postgraduate studies in 2006.

On 29 May 2022, Budi was elected as Chairman of UI's Social and Political Sciences Faculty alumni association.

== Early career ==
Budi began to work as a journalist at the Media Indonesia weekly in 1994. He later founded the Kontan business weekly alongside several colleagues in 1996. Due to his activist background, Budi's newspaper often included harsh criticism against businesspeople. He was warned by Kompas Gramedia founder Jakob Oetama for his harsh reporting.

He worked as a journalist for the publication until 2001. He then moved to the Mandiri Telekomunikasi Utama company, where he became its president director from 2001 until 2009. Budi also served as General Manager of Bangsa Tabloid from 2008 to 2009. Budi also led several non-media companies, such as Daya Mandiri from 2010, NKR Investama, Sarana Global Informasi, and Miitra Lumina Indonesia.

== Early political career ==
Budi was involved in the protests that occurred during the Fall of Suharto in 1998. He was elected chairman of UI's alumni association that year and served until 2001. He later founded the Jakarta Scholar Movement (GSJ) and Indonesian Professional Society (MPI).

Budi joined the Indonesian Democratic Party of Struggle (PDIP) in the early 2000s. He was immediately appointed to head the party's research and development department from 2005 until 2010. In 2009, he was nominated by the party for a seat in the People's Representative Council from the Jakarta III electoral district but was not elected. He then became the deputy chairman of PDIP in Jakarta.

=== Projo ===
Budi established Projo, an organization consisting pro-Joko Widodo volunteers, in August 2013. The organization became a major contributor to Joko Widodo's 2014 presidential campaign and was regarded as a key organization that led Joko Widodo to victory in the 2014 Indonesian presidential election. Projo was reactivated for the 2019 Indonesian general election and saw Joko Widodo's victory in the same election.

== Cabinet minister ==
=== Deputy Minister of Villages, Disadvantage Region, and Transmigration ===
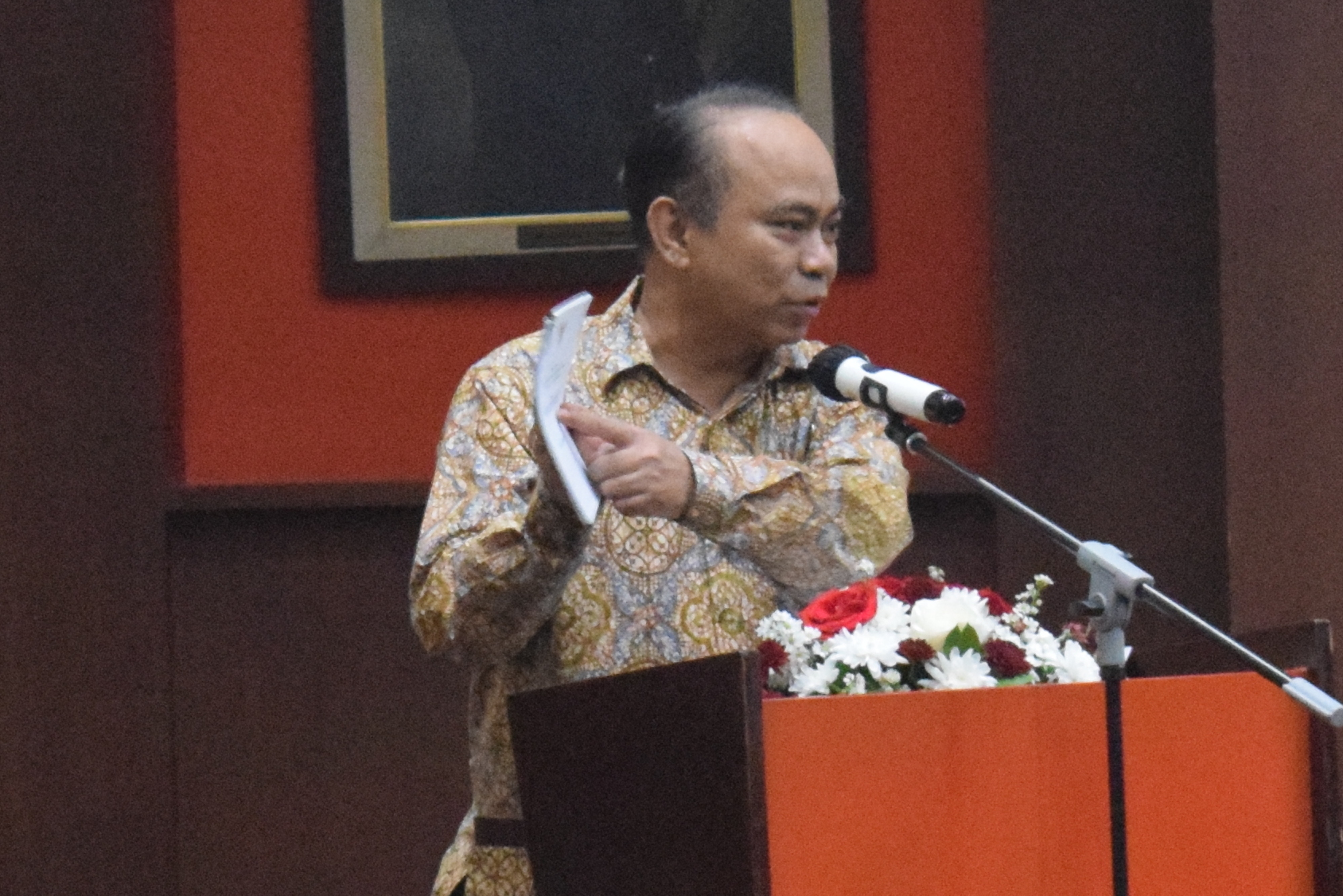
Budi Arie Setiadi delivering a speech at the University of Indonesia.

Three days after Joko Widodo's inauguration on 20 October 2019, he announced his cabinet lineup. Joko Widodo's new cabinet included his opponent in the election, Prabowo Subianto, as his minister, sparking protest from Projo members. Projo also criticized Wishnutama's appointment as minister despite his lack of support for Joko Widodo in his presidential campaigns. The secretary general of Projo, Handoko, dissolved Projo upon the announcement of the new cabinet, citing "deep disappointment" and a violation of the commitment "against intolerance and the willingness to be involved in politics". Projo later launched the hashtag #budiarieformenteri (Budi Arie For Minister) on Twitter.

Projo's attempt at launching the hashtag was criticized by Alifurrahman S. Asyari, the founder of the pro-Widodo Seword blogging site. In response to the hashtag, Asyari self-defaced its own website and replaced it with the text #AlifforWapres (Alif for Vice President). Joko Widodo then announced his lineup for the deputy ministers and appointed Setiadi as the deputy minister of villages, disadvantaged region, and transmigration. After the announcement, Setiadi cancelled the decision to dissolve Projo. Asyari responded harshly to Setiadi's decision to cancel the dissolution, stating that:

If I were in the position of Projo’s chairman [Setiadi], I would definitely be ashamed. It’s a matter of self-respect. It's better to have white bones than white eyes. But it seems like Projo doesn’t have any shame. So the offer was accepted, and Projo canceled the disbandment because they already got the position.

=== Minister of Communications and Informatics ===
In May 2023, Minister of Communications and Informatics Johnny G. Plate was arrested after being implicated in a corruption case. The corruption case implicating Plate centers around the cost mark-up of the deployment of base transceiver station in remote areas in Indonesia. Joko Widodo then appointed coordinating minister Mahfud MD as the acting minister.

Less than a month after his arrest, Joko Widodo appointed Setiadi as the new communications and information minister in a Cabinet reshuffle ahead of the 2024 general election. The reshuffle was widely seen as a move by the President to install his supporters in the administration before the general election in February. After being inaugurated as a minister, Setiadi announced his plans to form a body to supervise the contents of social media.

== Personal life ==
Budi Arie Setiadi married Zara Murzandina. The couple has two children.

According to a report from the Corruption Eradication Commission (KPK), Budi Arie has a wealth of IDR 101,000,000,000 (USD 7,058,919), consisting of land and buildings, three cars, other movable assets, securities, cash and cash equivalents, and other assets. He owns land and buildings in several cities including South Tangerang, North Jakarta, Central Jakarta, and Tangerang. He also has inherited land in several locations in Bekasi and Padang.

== Works ==
- Setiadi, Budi Arie (2017). Menjemput Takdir Sejarah. jakarta: RMBooks (Publisher). pp. 166 halaman. ISBN 9786027936690.
- Setiadi, Budi Arie (2001). An ASEAN of the people, by the people, for the people. report of the First ASEAN People's Assembly. ASEAN Institutes of Strategic and International Studies. p. 240. ISBN 9789798026706.
