= Johnny G. Plate =

Indonesian politician (born 1956)

Johnny Gerard Plate
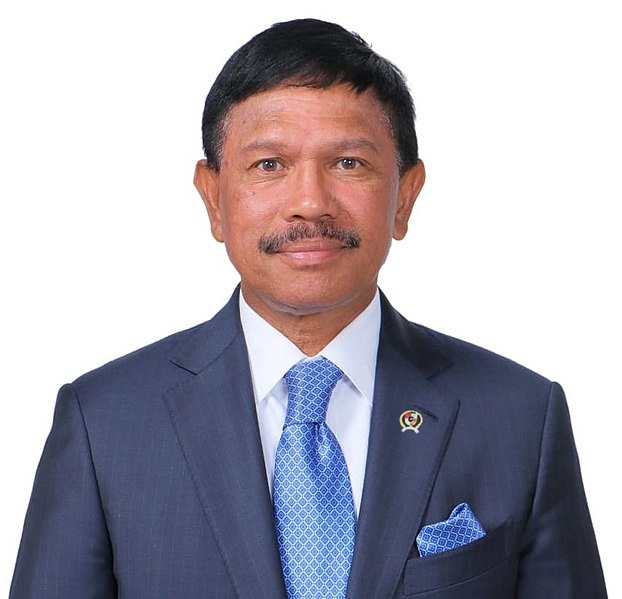
- Official portrait, 2019

6th Minister of Communications and Informatics
- In office 23 October 2019 – 17 May 2023
- President: Joko Widodo
- Preceded by: Rudiantara
- Succeeded by: Budi Arie Setiadi

Member of People's Representative Council
- In office 1 October 2014 – 23 October 2019
- Constituency: East Nusa Tenggara

Personal details
- Born: 10 September 1956 (age 70) Ruteng, East Nusa Tenggara, Indonesia
- Party: NasDem Party
- Spouse: Maria Ana
- Children: 3
- Education: Atma Jaya Catholic University

Johnny Gerard Plate (born 10 September 1956) is an Indonesian politician and businessman who served as Minister of Communication and Information Technology in Joko Widodo's Onward Indonesia Cabinet from 2019 to 2023. Previously, he served in the People's Representative Council for five years, and had been reelected for a second term in the 2019 election. He is a graduate of Atma Jaya Catholic University of Indonesia.

On 17 May 2023, Plate was arrested under charges of corruption. The Attorney General of Indonesia formally made him a suspect of a Rp 8 trillion (US$550 million) graft case related to Base Transceiver Station projects between 2020 and 2022. Mahfud MD was named acting Minister of Communication and Information Technology thereafter.

== Early life and education ==
Johnny Gerard Plate was born in the town of Ruteng, in Flores, on 10 September 1956, from Paulus Plate, a health nurse, and Theresia Pora, an elementary school teacher. He studied economics and business management at the Atma Jaya Catholic University, from 1979 to 1986.

== Career ==
In the early 1980s, he entered the business of agricultural equipment, during a boom in new plantations in Kalimantan and Papua. He later joined AirAsia and served as commissioner in several companies.

Plate ran in the 2014 legislative election as a NasDem Party candidate in the East Nusa Tenggara 1 electoral district, and he successfully secured a seat after winning 33,704 votes. During his term in the People's Representative Council, he was appointed secretary-general of Nasdem in 2017. He was reelected in 2019 with 115,921 votes.

On 23 October 2019, President Joko Widodo appointed Plate as the Minister of Communication and Information Technology.

== Corruption case ==
On 17 May 2023, Plate was arrested for being involved in a corruption case in the 4G base transceiver station infrastructure project for supporting infrastructure packages 1, 2, 3, 4, and 5 Bakti Kominfo 2020–2022. State losses was estimated around 8 trillion rupiah. Plate is alleged to have received special privileges to play golf six times, totaling 420 million rupiah. Additionally, his hotel bills were paid during trips to Barcelona, Paris, London, and the United States. It is alleged that Plate benefited from corruption amounting to 17.8 billion. Plate allegedly demanded that some of the graft payment to be sent for humanitarian purposes such as the flood victims in East Flores, Christian Evangelical Church in Timor in East Nusa Tenggara, and the Roman Catholic Archdiocese of Kupang. Plate is alleged to have demanded a monthly payment of 500 million rupiah and refused to conduct a feasibility study for the 4G base transceiver station project. Furthermore, he allegedly allowed the contractor to receive full payment despite their failure to complete the project within the designated timeframe.

Plate stated that he never received any money or any special privileges. During the trial, Plate claimed that the construction of the stations was ordered by Indonesian President Joko Widodo and that he did not initiate the project with the intention of making a personal profit. He was found guilty and given a 15 year sentence.
