= List of permanent representatives of Indonesia to ASEAN =

Permanent Representative of the Republic of Indonesia to the Association of Southeast Asian Nations
- Utusan Tetap Republik Indonesia untuk Perhimpunan Bangsa-Bangsa Asia Tenggara
- Emblem of the Ministry of Foreign Affairs

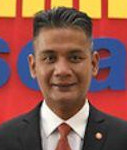
- Incumbent; M.I. Derry Aman since 25 October 2021
- Ministry of Foreign Affairs; Permanent Mission of Indonesia for the Association of Southeast Asian Nations
- Style: His Excellency (formal)
- Seat: Jakarta, Indonesia
- Appointer: President of Indonesia
- Inaugural holder: I Gede Ngurah Swajaya
- Formation: 2010
- Website: kemlu.go.id/ptri-asean

The following are the list of Indonesian diplomats that served as Permanent Representative of the Republic of Indonesia to the Association of Southeast Asian Nations (ASEAN).

== List ==
No.	Portrait	Permanent Representative	Term start	Term end	Appointed by	Ref.
1		I Gede Ngurah Swajaya	20 January 2010 (Credential: 23 March 2010)	2013	Susilo Bambang Yudhoyono	
2		Rahmat Pramono	24 December 2013 (Credential: 23 January 2014)	2018	Susilo Bambang Yudhoyono	
3		Ade Padmo Sarwono	20 February 2018 (Credential: 2 April 2018)	September 2021	Joko Widodo	
4		Derry Aman	25 October 2021 (Credential: 3 December 2021)	Incumbent	Joko Widodo	

== See also ==
- List of Indonesian ambassadors
- List of diplomatic missions of Indonesia
