= Ahmad Ridha Sabana =

Indonesian entrepreneur and politician

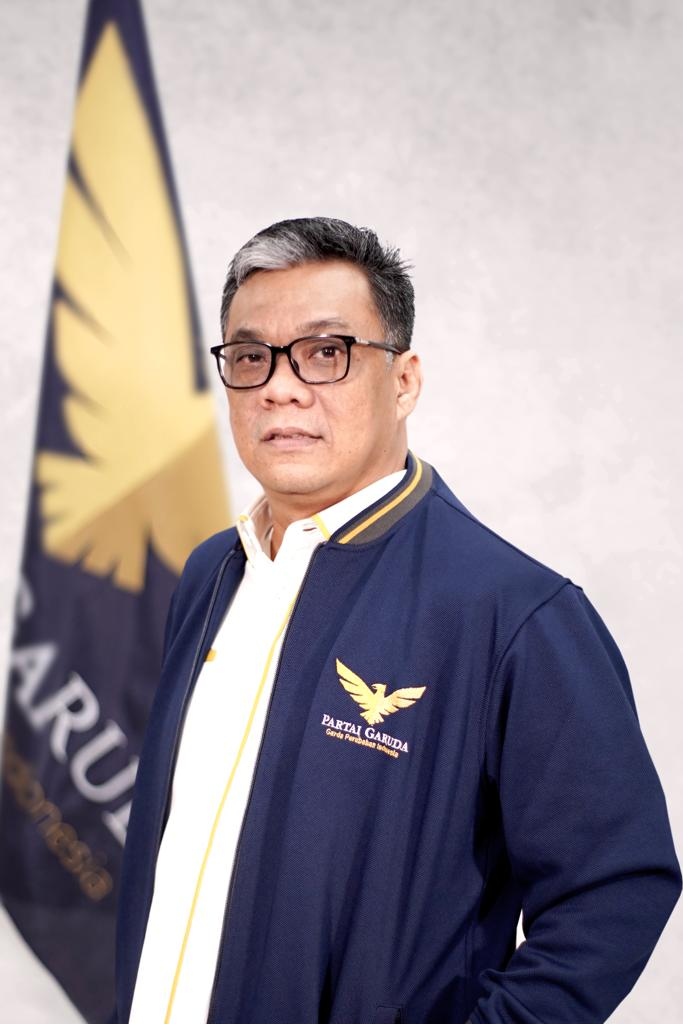

Leader of the Garuda Party
- Incumbent
- Assumed office 16 April 2015

Personal details
- Born: 22 January 1972 (age 54) Banjarmasin, South Kalimantan, Indonesia
- Party: Garuda Party
- Relatives: Ahmad Riza Patria (brother)

Ahmad Ridha Sabana (born 22 January 1972) is an Indonesian entrepreneur and politician. He is active in the KNPI (Central Indonesian Youth Committee) and was nominated as the chairman of the KNPI for the 2011–2014 term.

Since 2014, he had been president director of commercial television network PT Cipta Televisi Pendidikan Indonesia (TPI), owned by Siti Hardiyanti ‘Tutut’ Rukmana, the eldest daughter of Suharto. As president director of TPI, Ridha supported Tutut's ownership of the network against legal challenges by media tycoon Hary Tanoesoedibjo. In February 2018, Ridha told reporters he was no longer president director of TPI.

Ridha was listed as an owner of Gala Group, which houses several companies: Gala Galaatama (contracting, trading and supplying), Gala Griyatama (real estate), Gala Jayatama (supplies and systems integrator), and Gala Surya Karyatama (chemical industry). Since 2009, he has been listed as President Director of a company called Lintas Technologies.

In 2014, he stood as a candidate for the Jakarta legislative assembly, representing the Great Indonesia Movement Party (Gerindra) in East Jakarta, although his address was listed as being in South Jakarta. He received 3,691 votes.
