= Abdul Halim Iskandar =

Indonesian politician (born 1962)

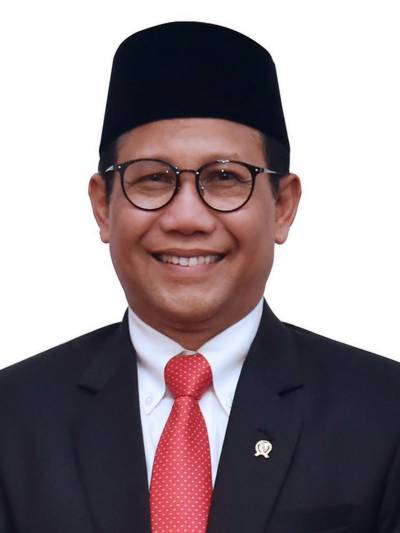
- Official portrait, 2019

7th Minister of Villages, Development of Disadvantage Regions, and Transmigration
- In office 23 October 2019 – 1 October 2024
- President: Joko Widodo
- Preceded by: Eko Putro Sandjojo
- Succeeded by: Yandri Susanto

12th Speaker of the East Java Regional House of Representatives
- In office 2 October 2014 – 31 August 2019
- Preceded by: Imam Sunardhi
- Succeeded by: Kusnadi

Personal details
- Born: 14 July 1962 (age 64) Jombang, East Java, Indonesia
- Party: National Awakening Party
- Spouse: Lilik Umi Nasriiyah
- Relations: Muhaimin Iskandar (brother)
- Children: 3
- Education: Yogyakarta State University (Drs.); State University of Malang (M.Pd.)

Abdul Halim Iskandar (born 14 July 1962), often nicknamed Gus Halim, is an Indonesian politician who is the 7th and former Minister of Villages, Development of Disadvantaged Regions, and Transmigration in President Joko Widodo's Onward Indonesia Cabinet since 2019-2024. A member of the National Awakening Party (PKB), he previously served as the speaker of the East Java Regional People's Representative Council from 2014 to 2019. Halim is the brother of Muhaimin Iskandar, the leader of the PKB, and the great-grandchild of Bisri Syansuri, a politician and figure in the Nahdlatul Ulama. He is married to Lilik Umi Nasriiyah, the couple has 3 children.
