= Permanent Mission of Indonesia for ASEAN =

Permanent Mission of the Republic of Indonesia for the Association of Southeast Asian Nations Perutusan Tetap Republik Indonesia untuk Perhimpunan Bangsa-Bangsa Asia Tenggara
- Location: Jakarta, Indonesia
- Address: Jl. Sisingamangaraja No. 73, Senayan; Jakarta Selatan 12120
- Jurisdiction: ASEAN
- Permanent representative: M. I. Derry Iman
- Website: kemlu.go.id/ptri-asean/en

Permanent Mission of the Republic of Indonesia for the Association of Southeast Asian Nations (Indonesian: Perutusan Tetap Republik Indonesia untuk Perhimpunan Bangsa-Bangsa Asia Tenggara), commonly abbreviated as PTRI Jakarta, is a diplomatic mission of Indonesia to the Association of Southeast Asian Nations (ASEAN). This diplomatic mission is one of the three Indonesian permanent missions for multilateral organizations, besides the Permanent Mission to the United Nations in New York and Permanent Mission to the United Nations in Geneva.

The first Indonesian Permanent Representative to ASEAN is I Gede Ngurah Swajaya, which took office from 2010 until 2013. The incumbent permanent representative is M. I. Derry Aman since 25 October 2021. The mission office is located in Senayan, South Jakarta, with close proximity to the ASEAN Headquarters in Jalan Sisingamangaraja.

== See also ==
- List of Indonesian ambassadors
- List of diplomatic missions of Indonesia
