= Minister of Villages and Development of Disadvantaged Regions =

- Menteri Desa dan Pembangunan Daerah Tertinggal
- Ministerial seal

- Ministerial flag

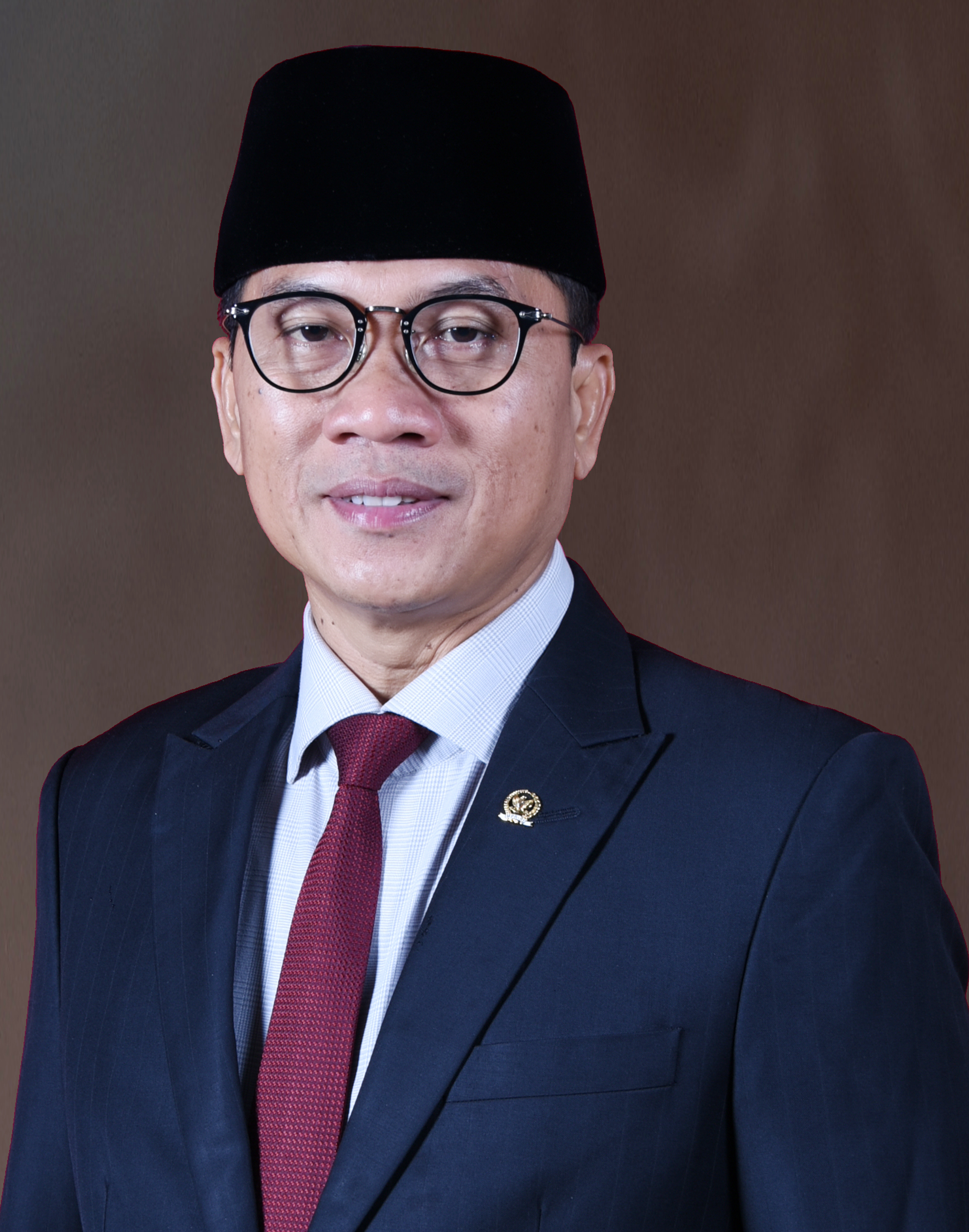
- Incumbent; Yandri Susanto since 20 October 2024
- Ministry of Villages and Development of Disadvantaged Regions
- Member of: Cabinet of Indonesia
- Appointer: President of Indonesia
- Formation: 26 August 2000 as Junior Minister; 10 August 2001 as Minister
- First holder: Manuel Kaisiepo
- Deputy: Ahmad Riza Patria
- Website: www.kemendesa.go.id

The current Indonesian Minister of Villages and Development of Disadvantaged Regions is Yandri Susanto since 20 October 2024. The minister is supported by Deputy Minister of Villages and Development of Disadvantaged Regions, which is Budi Arie Setiadi. The Minister administers the portfolio through the Ministry of Villages and Development of Disadvantaged Regions.

President Abdurrahman Wahid appointed Manuel Kaisiepo as a junior minister equivalent to a deputy minister in charge of the government's strategic program. Then continued by the Megawati government by forming a new ministry called the Ministry of Acceleration of Development in Eastern. Under President Susilo Bambang Yudhoyono, the state minister post was abolished since 19 October 2011, so that it changed its name to Minister of Development of Disadvantaged Regions. On 26 October 2014, President Joko Widodo announces his cabinet. Transmigration Portfolio is separated from the Ministry of Manpower and merged with the Ministry of Development of Disadvantaged Regions. In the second period, Joko Widodo added a deputy minister to assist the village minister's duties.

== List of ministers ==
From most of its existence, this minister post always held by National Awakening Party politicians, making it unique among many ministries in Indonesia until the appointment of Yandri Susanto of the National Mandate Party (PAN). The following individuals have been appointed as Minister of Villages, Development of Disadvantaged Regions, and Transmigration, or any of its precedent titles:

Political party: Independent PKB PAN

No.	Portrait	Name (Birth–Death)	Political party	Title	Took office	Left office	Cabinet
1		Manuel Kaisiepo (b. 1953) (State Minister)	Independent	State Minister of Acceleration of Development in Eastern	10 August 2001	20 October 2004	Mutual Assistance
2		Saifullah Yusuf (b. 1964) (State Minister)	PKB	State Minister of Acceleration of Development in Underdeveloped Regions	21 October 2004	9 May 2007	First United Indonesia
3		Muhammad Lukman Edy (b. 1970) (State Minister)	PKB	State Minister of Development in Underdeveloped Regions	9 May 2007	1 October 2009	First United Indonesia
–		Djoko Kirmanto (ad-interim) (b. 1943)	Independent	State Minister of Development in Underdeveloped Regions	1 October 2009	20 October 2009	First United Indonesia
4		Helmy Faishal Zaini (b. 1972) (State Minister)	PKB	State Minister of Development in Underdeveloped Regions	22 October 2009	1 October 2014	Second United Indonesia
4		Helmy Faishal Zaini (b. 1972) (State Minister)	PKB	Minister of Development of Underdeveloped Regions	22 October 2009	1 October 2014	Second United Indonesia
–		Armida Alisjahbana (ad-interim) (b. 1960)	Independent	Minister of Development of Underdeveloped Regions	1 October 2014	20 October 2014	Second United Indonesia
5		Marwan Jafar (b. 1971)	PKB	Minister of Villages, Development of Disadvantaged Regions, and Transmigration	27 October 2014	27 July 2016	Working
6		Eko Putro Sandjojo (b. 1965)	PKB	Minister of Villages, Development of Disadvantaged Regions, and Transmigration	27 July 2016	20 October 2019	Working
7		Abdul Halim Iskandar (b. 1962)	PKB	Minister of Villages, Development of Disadvantaged Regions, and Transmigration	23 October 2019	1 October 2024	Onward Indonesia
-		Muhadjir Effendy (ad-interim) (b. 1956)	Independent	Minister of Villages, Development of Disadvantaged Regions, and Transmigration	1 October 2024	20 October 2024	Onward Indonesia
8		Yandri Susanto (b. 1974)	PAN	Minister of Villages and Development of Disadvantaged Regions	20 October 2024	-	Red White Cabinet

== List of deputy ministers ==
The following individuals have been appointed as Deputy Minister of Villages, Development of Disadvantaged Regions, and Transmigration, or any of its precedent titles:

Political party: Independent Gerindra Party

No.	Portrait	Name (Birth–Death)	Political party	Title	Took office	Left office	Cabinet
1		Manuel Kaisiepo (b. 1953) (Junior Minister)	Independent	Junior Minister of Acceleration of Development in Eastern	26 August 2000	23 July 2001	National Unity
2		Budi Arie Setiadi (b. 1969)	Independent	Deputy Minister of Villages, Development of Disadvantaged Regions, and Transmigration	25 October 2019	17 July 2023	Onward Indonesia
3		Ahmad Riza Patria (b. 1969)	Gerindra Party	Deputy Minister of Villages and Development of Disadvantaged Regions	20 October 2024	-	Red White Cabinet

== See also ==
- Ministry of Villages, Development of Disadvantaged Regions, and Transmigration
