= Ministry of Cooperatives (Indonesia) =

Government ministry of Indonesia

Ministry of Cooperative
- Kementerian Koperasi
- Logo of the Ministry of Cooperative

Ministry overview
- Formed: 6 March 1962
- Jurisdiction: Government of Indonesia
- Headquarters: Jl. HR Rasuna Said Kav 3-4 Karet Kuningan Setiabudi Jakarta Selatan 12940 Jakarta, Indonesia
- Minister responsible: Ferry Juliantono, Minister of Cooperative
- Deputy Minister responsible: Farida Faricha, Deputy Minister of Cooperative
- Parent department: Coordinating Ministry for Social Empowerment
- Website: kop.go.id

Ministry of Cooperatives of the Republic of Indonesia (abbreviated as Kemenkop) is a ministry in the Government of Indonesia that handles cooperative affairs. The Ministry of Cooperatives is led by a Minister of Cooperatives (Menkop) who since October 21, 2024 has been held by Budi Arie Setiadi.

== Duties and functions ==
The Ministry has the task of organizing government affairs in the field of cooperatives to assist the President in organizing the government of the country. The Ministry carries out the following functions:

- formulation and determination of policies in the field of institutions, digitalization, business development, talent development, increasing competitiveness, and supervision of cooperatives;
- coordination and synchronization of the implementation of policies in the field of institutions, digitalization, business development, talent development, increasing competitiveness, and supervision of cooperatives;
- coordination of task implementation, coaching, and providing administrative support to all organizational elements within the Ministry;
- management of state property/assets that are the responsibility of the Ministry;
- supervision of task implementation within the Ministry; and
- implementation of other functions assigned by the president.

== Organizational structure ==
The organizational structure of the Ministry consists of:

- Office of the Ministry of Cooperative
- Office of the Deputy Ministry of Cooperative
- Office of Secretariat of the Ministry
- Deputy for Institutional and Digitalization of Cooperatives
- Deputy for Cooperative Business Development
- Deputy for Talent Development and Cooperative Competitiveness
- Deputy for Cooperative Supervision
- Inspectorate
- Board of Experts
  - Senior Expert to the Minister for Macroeconomics
  - Senior Expert to the Minister for Public Policy
  - Senior Expert to the Minister for Inter-Institutional Relations
