= Hendardji Supandji =

Indonesian politician (born 1952)

Hendardji Soepandji (born 10 February 1952 in Semarang, Indonesia) is a retired general of Indonesian army. He was one of six candidates for 2012 Jakarta gubernatorial election. He is the brother of the former Indonesian Attorney General, Hendarman Soepandji and Governor of Lemhanas (Lembaga Ketahanan Nasional), Budi Susilo Soepandji.

== Biography ==
Hendardji was born on 10 February 1952, in Semarang. According to his mother, Hendardji had shown his interest about military since he was 8. After graduating from high school and becoming the best graduate in Karesidenan Semarang, Hendardji enrolled to military academy, though his teachers suggested him to attend Bandung Institute of Technology. His last rank was major general, and had served as security assistant of the Chief Staff of the Army. In early October 2010, he was elected the chief executive of Pusat Pengelolaan Komplek Kemayoran (Kemayoran Complex Management Centre).

== Personal life ==
Hendardji's mother is Roesmijati Soepandji. He is the little brother of Hendarman Supandji, an Indonesian prosecutor, and the big brother of Budi Susilo Supandji.
