= Agency of Religious Moderation and Human Resource Development =

Government agency of Indonesia

- Badan Moderasi Beragama dan Pengembangan Sumber Daya Manusia (BMBPSDM)

Agency overview
- Formed: 26 January 2023
- Preceding agencies: Research, Development, Education, and Training Agency of the Ministry of Religious Affairs; Center for Religious Harmony of the Ministry of Religious Affairs
- Jurisdiction: Indonesia
- Agency executive: Muhammad Ali Ramdhani, Head of BMBPSDM
- Parent agency: Ministry of Religious Affairs

The Agency of Religious Moderation and Human Resource Development (Indonesian: Badan Moderasi Beragama dan Pengembangan Sumber Daya Manusia, abbreviated as BMBPSDM) is the supporting unit of the Ministry of Religious Affairs, which is responsible for promoting religious moderation and fostering the development of the ministry's human resource and capabilities in Indonesia. It was formed on 26 January 2023.

== History ==
The agency is established as a replacement for the Ministry of Religious Affairs' Research, Development, Education, and Training Agency which already integrated with National Research and Innovation Agency (Indonesian: Badan Riset dan Inovasi Nasional, BRIN) as part of the Research Organization for Social Sciences and Humanities (Indonesian: Organisasi Riset Ilmu Pengetahuan Sosial dan Humaniora, ORIPSH) and Research Organization for Archaeology, Language, and Letters (Indonesian: Organisasi Riset Arkeologi, Bahasa, dan Sastra, ORARBASTRA). The integration left only the former agency's Education and Training part unintegrated into BRIN. Eventually, the Center for Religious Harmony (Indonesian: Pusat Kerukunan Umat Beragama) of the Ministry of Religious Affairs also merged with the remnant of the former Research, Development, Education, and Training Agency. The amalgamation resulted in the formation of the BMBPSDM.

The agency's first head is Suyitno, a Ministry of Religious Affairs official.

== The Nine Measures ==
The agency developed the strategic programs and policies for the Ministry's policies known as The Nine Measures on 5 February 2023. The Nine Measures are:

1. Acceleration of religious moderation to prevent the misuse of religious teachings for identity politics.
2. The advocation of worship places building.
3. Community empowerment and development of early warning system for intolerant religious activities and religious conflicts.
4. Upgrading the competence and raising the welfare of religious extension officials.
5. Acceleration of the halal certification.
6. Defending and safeguarding the public satisfaction over Hajj, innovation, and optimization in Waqf certification and social funds monitoring.
7. Upgrading the professional capabilities of Ministry of Religious Affairs employees.
8. Acceleration of formulation of the regulations related to religious services.
9. Institutional transformation, status transfer, and independence of religious education institutions.

== Religious Intelligence ==
Aside from being the promoter of religious harmony, the agency is also projected to be one of Indonesia's intelligence agencies. As an intelligence agency, BMBPSDM will work together with National Counter Terrorism Agency in monitoring religious extremism and intolerant religious activities in Indonesia, providing early warning and intelligence on matters related to religious terrorism, and preventing religious terrorism acts.

== Research Functions ==
Despite most of its research functions already transferred BRIN, BMBPPSDM still retain some of its researcher and its research functions, albeit already downsized in scale. The research currently performed in BMBPSDM mainly for the ministry' policies development purposes that are not domain of BRIN research, such as research in public services performed by the ministry (e.g. marriage registrar and officials, religious laws, hajj and umrah, social research relating to establishment of new religious places, zakat and waqf, and state halal policies), curricular development for state religious universities run-by the ministry and curriculum monitoring of private religious universities, conservation of religious classic texts and development of contemporary religious teaching texts.

== Structure ==
The structure of the agency is as follows:

- Office of the Head of the Agency of Religious Moderation and Human Resource Development
  - Agency of Religious Moderation and Human Resource Development Secretariat
  - Strategic Policies Development Center for Development Policies in Religious Affairs
  - Strategic Policies Development Center for Religious Education and Religious Studies
  - Competency Development Center for Management, Leadership, and Religious Moderation
  - Competency Development Center for Education Personnel and Religious Human Resources Competencies
  - Bureau for Checking Copies of the Qur'an
    - Bayt Al-Qur'an and Museum Istiqlal (BQMI), Taman Mini Indonesia Indah, East Jakarta
  - Aceh Religious Education and Training Center
  - Medan Religious Education and Training Center
  - Padang Religious Education and Training Center
  - Palembang Religious Education and Training Center
  - Jakarta Religious Education and Training Center
  - Bandung Religious Education and Training Center
  - Semarang Religious Education and Training Center
  - Surabaya Religious Education and Training Center
  - Banjarmasin Religious Education and Training Center
  - Manado Religious Education and Training Center
  - Denpasar Religious Education and Training Center
  - Makassar Religious Education and Training Center
  - Ambon Religious Education and Training Center
  - Papua Religious Education and Training Center
  - Jakarta Religious Research and Development Center
  - Makassar Religious Research and Development Center
  - Semarang Religious Research and Development Center
