= Research Organization for Earth Sciences and Maritime =

Indonesian research organization

- Organisasi Riset Ilmu Pengetahuan Kebumian dan Maritim (ORIPKM/ORKM)

Agency overview
- Formed: 1 September 2021; 1 March 2022 (current form)
- Preceding agency: see list
- Jurisdiction: Indonesia
- Agency executive: Ocky Karna Rajasa, Head of ORIPKM
- Parent agency: National Research and Innovation Agency
- Website: https://brin.go.id/orkm

The Research Organization for Earth Sciences and Maritime (Indonesian: Organisasi Riset Ilmu Pengetahuan Kebumian dan Maritim, ORIPKM but also known as ORKM) is one of Research Organizations under the umbrella of the National Research and Innovation Agency (Badan Riset dan Inovasi Nasional, BRIN). It was founded on 1 September 2021 as Research Organization for Earth Sciences (Organisasi Riset Ilmu Pengetahuan Kebumian, ORIPK), transformation of Deputy I (Earth Sciences) of Indonesian Institute of Sciences (Lembaga Ilmu Pengetahuan Indonesia, LIPI) after the liquidation of LIPI into BRIN.

On 24 January 2022, it is announced that the organization extended with fusion of elements from Geospatial Information Agency, Meteorology, Climatology, and Geophysical Agency, Ministry of Marine Affairs and Fisheries, Ministry of Public Works and Housing, Ministry of Energy and Mineral Resources, and Aeronautics and Space Research Organization-LAPAN. The fusion expected to turn ORIPK to ORKM officially on 1 February 2022. ORKM formation is finalized on 1 March 2022 and is functional since 4 March 2022.

== History ==
Founded on 1 September 2021 as ORIPK, ORIPK was transformation of Deputy I (Earth Sciences) of LIPI after the liquidation of LIPI into BRIN. As research organizations of BRIN, as outlined in Article 175 and Article 176 of Chief of BRIN Decree No. 1/2021, every Research Organizations under BRIN are responsible and answered to Chief of BRIN. It also prescribed that the Research Organizations consisted with Head of Research Organizations, Centers, and Laboratories/Study Groups. For the transitional period, as in Article 210 of Chief of BRIN Decree No. 1/2021 mandated, the structure of ORIPK follows the preceding structure that already established during its time in LIPI. Due to this, the structure of ORIPK follows the Chief of LIPI Decree No. 24/2020. On 22 September 2021, ORIPK constituting document, Chief of BRIN Decree No. 9/2021, signed by Laksana Tri Handoko and fully published on 8 October 2021.

On 24 January 2022, it is announced that the organization extended with fusion of elements from Geospatial Information Agency, Meteorology, Climatology, and Geophysical Agency, Ministry of Marine Affairs and Fisheries, Aeronautics and Space Research Organization-LAPAN. The fusion turned ORIPK to ORIPKM officially on 1 February 2022. The organization name officially become ORIPKM thru Chairman of BRIN Decree No. 8/2022, backdated from 25 February 2022.

On 4 March 2022, ORKM is fully functional with inauguration of its first head, Ocky Karna Rajasa.

== Preceding agencies ==
Based on the structure of ORKM, the preceding agencies of the ORKM were:

- Earth Sciences Research Organization of National Research and Innovation Agency
- Center for Research, Product Promotion, and Cooperation of Geospatial Information Agency
- Center for Research and Development of Meteorology, Climatology, and Geophysical Agency
- Agency for Marine and Fisheries Research and Human Resources of Ministry of Marine Affairs and Fisheries
- Public Works and Housing Research and Development Agency of Ministry of Public Works and Housing (partial)
- Energy and Mineral Resources Research and Development Agency of Ministry of Energy and Mineral Resources
- Atmospheric Sciences and Technology Center of Aeronautics and Space Research Organization-LAPAN

== Structure ==
As the latest Chairman of BRIN Decree No. 8/2025, the structure of ORKM is as follows:

1. Office of the Head of ORKM
2. Research Center for Geological Disaster
3. Research Center for Climate and Atmosphere
4. Research Center for Limnology and Water Resources
5. Research Center for Geological Resources
6. Research Center for Oceanography
7. Research Center for Deep Sea

== List of heads ==
No.	Head	Took office	Left office	Title
1	Ocky Karna Rajasa	1 September 2021	4 March 2022	Acting Head of ORIPK
1	Ocky Karna Rajasa	4 March 2022	Incumbent	Head of ORKM
