= Research Organization for Governance, Economy, and Public Welfare =

Indonesian research organization

- Organisasi Riset Tata Kelola Pemerintahan, Ekonomi, dan Kesejahteraan Masyarakat (ORTKP-EKM)

Agency overview
- Formed: 1 March 2022
- Preceding agency: see Preceding Agencies
- Jurisdiction: Indonesia
- Agency executive: Agus Eko Nugroho, Head of ORTKP-EKM
- Parent agency: National Research and Innovation Agency

The Research Organization for Governance, Economy, and Public Welfare (Indonesian: Organisasi Riset Tata Kelola Pemerintahan, Ekonomi, dan Kesejahteraan Masyarakat, ORTKP-EKM) is one of Research Organizations under the umbrella of the National Research and Innovation Agency (Badan Riset dan Inovasi Nasional, BRIN). On 24 January 2022, the formation of the agency is announced and expected to be formed on 1 February 2022. The agency is resulted from amalgamation of various research and development agencies.

ORTKP-EKM is elevation of Economic Research Center of Research Organization for Social Sciences and Humanities.

== History ==
The origin of ORTKP-EKM can be traced back to the foundation of Economic Research Center (Pusat Penelitian Ekonomi, PPE) which was founded on 1962. The PPE was a unit of Indonesian Council of Sciences (Majelis Ilmu Pengetahuan Indonesia, MIPI), predecessor of Indonesian Institute of Sciences (Lembaga Ilmu Pengetahuan Indonesia, LIPI). PPE later become part of LIPI after LIPI formation. In September 2021, the research center acquired by BRIN and renamed into Pusat Riset Ekonomi or PRE. Since its foundation, PRE play role to assess and contributed to policy making for economical affairs to Indonesian government.

In accordance of announcement of 24 January 2022, PRE was undergo the elevation process from a research center to research organization. The elevation process is needed by PRE to consolidate human resources and research capabilities in economical researches previously scattered at various ministries into one research organization. As economical issues also relate to governmental issues, connectivity, and public policies, it is decided by BRIN leadership to include relevant agencies to the body of PRE, resulted in formation of ORTKP-EKM.

ORTKP-EKM formation is finalized on 1 March 2022 and is functional since 4 March 2022 with inauguration of its first head, Agus Eko Nugroho.

== Preceding agencies ==
Based on the structure of ORTKP-EKM, the preceding agencies of the ORTKP-EKM were:

1. Economic Research Center of Research Organization for Social Sciences and Humanities.
2. Research and Development Agency of the Ministry of Home Affairs
3. Agency for Social Education, Research, and Extension of the Ministry of Social Affairs
4. Agency for Development and Information of Villages, Development of Disadvantaged Regions, and Transmigration of the Ministry of Villages, Development of Disadvantaged Regions and Transmigration
5. Transportation Research and Development Agency of the Ministry of Transportation
6. Fiscal Economy Agency of the Ministry of Finance
7. Assistant Deputy-ship of Cooperatives and Small & Medium Enterprises Research and Development of the Ministry of Cooperatives and Small & Medium Enterprises
8. Trade Policy Analysis and Development Agency of the Ministry of Trade
9. Agency for Industrial Research and Development of the Ministry of Industry

== Structure ==
The structure of ORTKP-EKM is as follows:

1. Office of the Head of ORTKP-EKM
2. Research Center for Domestic Government
3. Research Center for Public Policy
4. Research Center for Social Welfare, Village, and Connectivity
5. Research Center for Macroeconomics and Finance
6. Research Center for Cooperative, Corporation, and People's Economy
7. Research Center for Behavioral and Circular Economy
8. Research Center for Economics of Industrial, Services, and Trade
9. Research Groups

== List of heads ==
No.	Head	Took office	Left office	Title
1	Agus Eko Nugroho	4 March 2022	Incumbent	Head of ORTKP-EKM
