= Karampuang cave =

Archeological site in Indonesia

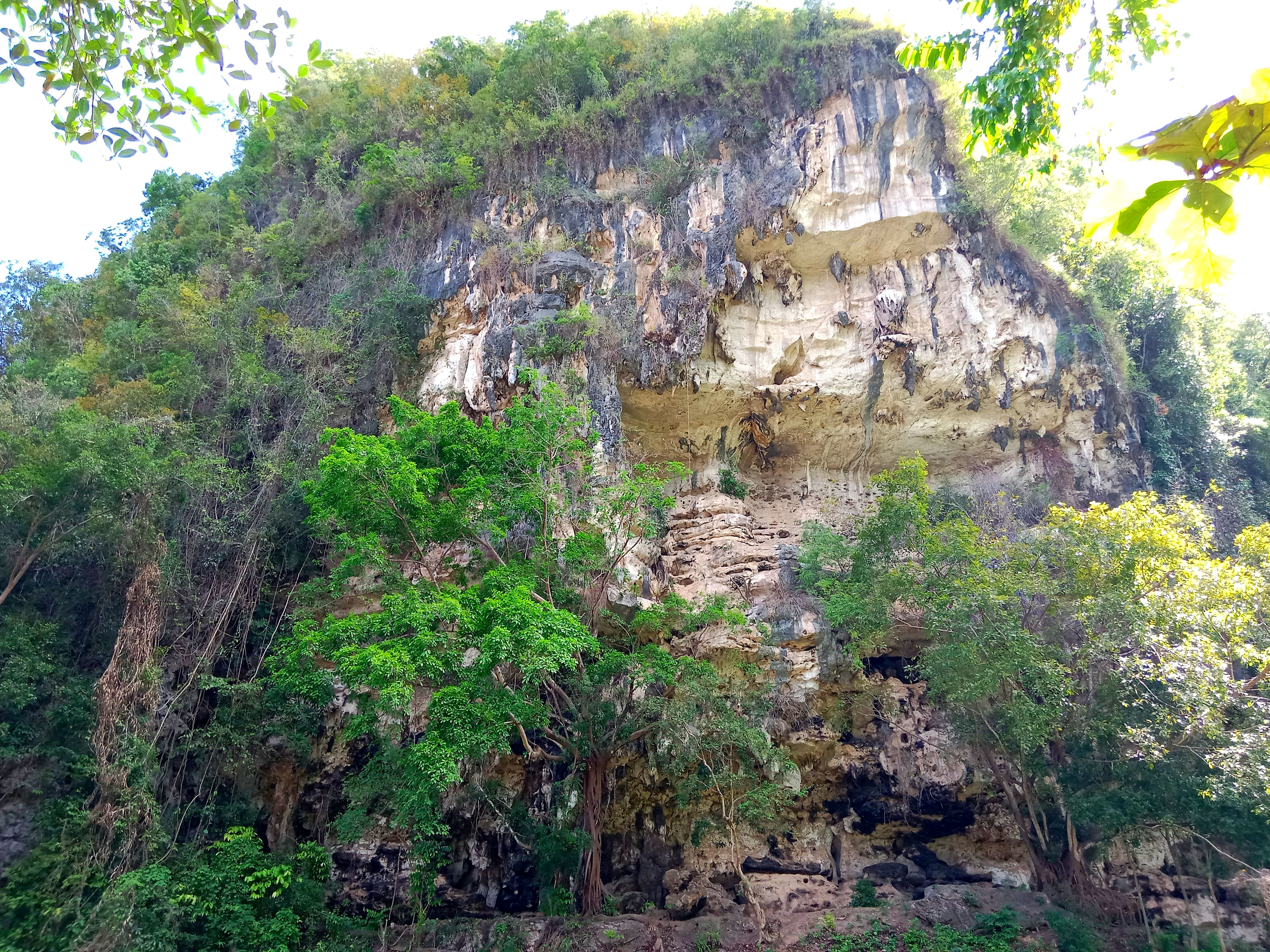
Karampuang cave

Leang Karampuang, also known as Karampuang cave, is a prehistoric archaeological site featuring cave paintings. It is located within the Maros-Pangkep Karst hills of Bantimurung-Bulusaraung National Park, situated administratively in Samangki Village, Simbang District, Maros Regency, South Sulawesi, Indonesia.

== Cave paintings ==
On July 3, 2024, the journal Nature published research findings indicating that the cave paintings in Leang Karampuang, which depict anthropomorphic figures interacting with a pig and measure 36 by 15 inches (91 by 38 cm), are approximately 51,200 years old, establishing them as the oldest known paintings in the world. This discovery stems from collaborative research conducted by the Research Organization for Archaeology, Language, and Letters of the National Research and Innovation Agency (BRIN), Southern Cross University, and Griffith University.
