= Amarulla Octavian =

Indonesian defense scientist

Vice Admiral Amarulla Octavian
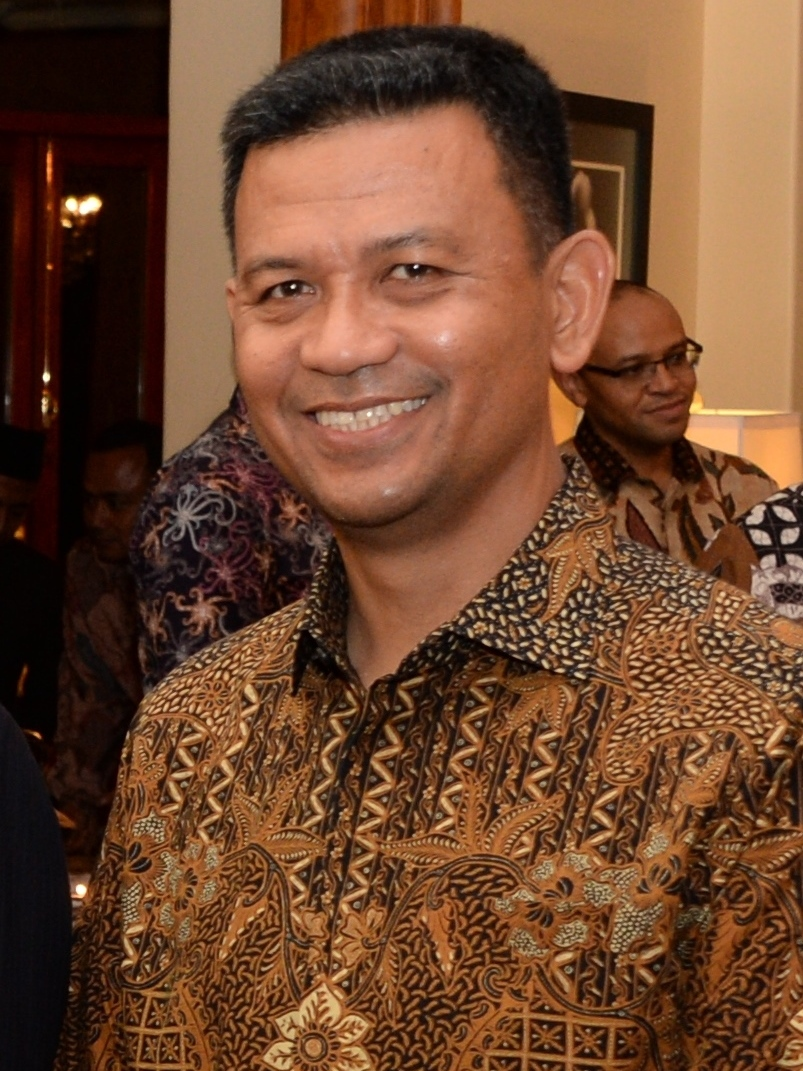

1st Deputy Chairman of National Research and Innovation Agency
- Incumbent
- Assumed office 3 August 2023
- President: Joko Widodo
- Preceded by: Office established

Personal details
- Born: Amarulla Octavian; 24 October 1965 (age 60) Surabaya, East Java, Indonesia
- Education: Indonesian Naval Academy; Indonesian Naval Technology College; Paris-Panthéon-Assas University; Collège interarmées de Défense; University of Indonesia

Military service
- Allegiance: Indonesia
- Branch/service: Indonesian Navy
- Years of service: 1988–2023
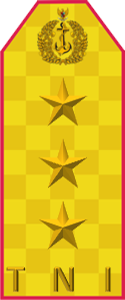
- Rank: Vice Admiral
- Unit: Fleet Forces

Amarulla Octavian is an Indonesian vice admiral and defense scientist. Prior his appointment as Deputy Chairman of National Research and Innovation Agency (BRIN), he was a professor and rector of Indonesian Defense University[id].

== Early life and education ==
Octavian was graduated from Indonesian Naval Academy in 1988 and commissioned as Second Lieutenant at Sailor Corps. He later continued his study at Indonesian Naval Technology College and graduated as military naval engineer in 2001. He took further education to Indonesian Navy Command and General Staff College and graduated in 2003. He took master's degree in France: Geopolitics and Defense Industries from Paris-Panthéon-Assas University and Military Sciences from Collège interarmées de Défense[fr], both graduated in 2006 and later he took Ph.D. degree in sociology from University of Indonesia and graduated in 2013.

He was appointed as professor in Military Sociology on 3 June 2021.

== Careers ==
Octavian was commissioned as officers of several Indonesian naval ships until 1994. He later become commanders of various naval formations since 2003 to 2016.

During 2009 to 2012, he was adjutant of President Susilo Bambang Yudhoyono.

He became lecturer at Indonesian Defense University in 2014. He later appointed as Dean of Faculty of Defense Management of Indonesian Defense University in 2016. In 2018, he appointed as Commander of Indonesian Navy Command and General Staff College. In 2020, he appointed as rector of Indonesian Defense University.

In 2022, he was considered by Joko Widodo to be the next Chief of Staff of the Indonesian Navy replacing Admiral Yudo Margono, but later Joko Widodo chose Vice Admiral Muhammad Ali as the chief instead of him on 28 December 2022.

== Appointment as Deputy Chairman of BRIN ==
On 3 August 2023, Octavian appointed by Joko Widodo as deputy chairman of BRIN. In his appointment ceremony as deputy chairman, however, Joko Widodo represented by Megawati Soekarnoputri as Chairwoman of BRIN Steering Committee. Laksana Tri Handoko revealed that his appointment was because of the need to share power and responsibilities to manage BRIN human resources and monitoring of several critical research centers.
