= Djunijanti Peggie =

Indonesian entomologist (born 1965)

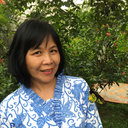
- Born: 7 June 1965; Bogor, Indonesia
- Education: Universitas Nasional (Dra, 1988); Imperial College London (MSc, 1992); Cornell University (PhD, 2002)
- Scientific career
- Fields: Entomology

Djunijanti Peggie is an entomologist who specializes in Lepidoptera of Indonesia. She is a research professor and curator for the National Research and Innovation Agency (BRIN, Indonesian: Badan Riset dan Inovasi Nasional). Peggie is the first Indonesian to become a butterfly researcher and author of books about butterflies. She is considered to be the mother of Indonesian butterfly studies.

== Background ==
Djunijanti Peggie was born in Bogor, Indonesia. She discovered her interest in butterflies in high school when she joined a nature club. She graduated from high school in 1984 and attended the National University in Jakarta, majoring in biology. Upon graduating from university, Peggie applied to work at the Indonesian Institute of Sciences. She started working there in 1990, hoping to utilize her prior experience researching termites and spiders. About three months after being hired, Peggie was asked to research butterflies due to the lack of researchers specializing in the study. She gladly accepted.

A year after being hired as a researcher, Peggie accepted an opportunity to continue her studies at the Imperial College London with a scholarship from the British Council. During her time in London, she also completed an internship at the British Museum of Natural History, now known as the Natural History Museum, London. There, she worked under the supervision of Dr. Dick Vane-Wright, who became her mentor. In 1992, she gained her master's in applied entomology and returned to Indonesia. A year after, Peggie was selected to become a graduate student in the United States with a scholarship from the American Museum of Natural History. In 2002, she graduated from Cornell University with a doctorate.

After returning to her home country and resuming her job, Peggie has made significant efforts to spark public interest in butterflies. She has written practical guides to butterflies for the Indonesian public. These efforts stem from her conviction to save endangered and rare butterflies. She hopes that as more people care about butterflies and nature, more plants that are essential for their survival will be available.

In July 2025, Peggie was appointed as a research professor by the National Research and Innovation Agency. At the inauguration ceremony, Peggie delivered a lecture entitled "Biodiversity, Conservation, and the Acceleration of Knowledge on Indonesian Butterflies". In it, Peggie explained that mobilizing citizen science and technology offers a solution for advancing knowledge of Indonesian butterflies, citing the success of the Kupunesia mobile app.

== Bibliography ==
Books:

- Practical Guide to the Butterflies of Bogor Botanical Garden (2006, bilingual)
- Precious and Protected Indonesian Butterflies (2011, bilingual)
- Mengenal Kupu-kupu (2014)
- Know Our Butterflies: for Kids (2014, bilingual)

Publications:

- Peggie, D.; Amir, M. & Astuti, D. (1991). "Growth and food consumption of Graphium larvae". Zoo Indonesia.
- Peggie, D.; Vane-Wright, R. I. & Yata, O. (1995). "An illustrated checklist of the pierid butterflies of northern and central Maluku (Indonesia)". The Butterfly Society of Japan. 11: 23-47.
- Peggie, D.; Rawlins, A. & Vane-Wright, R. I. (2001). "An illustrated checklist of the papilionid butterflies (Lepidoptera: Papilionidae) of northern and central Maluku, Indonesia". Nachrichten des Entomologischen Vereins Apollo. N.F. 26 (1/2): 41–60.
- Peggie, D. (2002). "Cladistic relationships and systematic overview of the Indo-Australian Heliconiine butterflies (Lepidoptera: Nymphalidae)". Cornell University, Jan.
- Peggie, D.; Vane-Wright, R. I. & van Mastrigt, H. J. G. (2009). "A new member of the Ideopsis gaura superspecies (Lepidoptera: Danainae) from the Foja Mountains, Papua, Indonesia". Suara Serangga Papua. 3 (4): 1-18.
- Peggie, D. (2009). "Inventory surveys of nymphalid butterflies in Java, Indonesia". The Nature & Insects. 44 (13): 11-13.
- Peggie, D. (2014). "Diversitas dan pentingnya kupu-kupu Nusa Kambangan (Jawa, Indonesia)". Zoo Indonesia. 23 (1): 45-55.
