= Indonesian Nuclear Technology Polytechnic =

Coordinates: 7°46′42″S 110°24′43″E

Polytechnic Institutes of Nuclear Technology, Indonesia
- Politeknik Teknologi Nuklir
- Type: State Polytechnic
- Established: 3 August 1985; 40 years ago
- Rector: Dr.Eng. Zainal Arief, S.T., M.T.
- Location: Sleman Regency, Special Region of Yogyakarta, Indonesia
- Campus: Urban
- Colors: Baby blue , Navy blue
- Mascot: Nusaki (Nuklir Sahabat Kita)
- Website: https://polteknuklir.ac.id/

The Polytechnic Institutes of Nuclear Technology, Indonesia (Indonesian: Politeknik Teknologi Nuklir, Poltek TN) is a state polytechnic under auspices of National Research and Innovation Agency (Indonesian: Badan Riset dan Inovasi Nasional, BRIN). It was originally founded as Indonesian State College of Nuclear Technology of National Nuclear Energy Agency of Indonesia (Indonesian: Badan Tenaga Nuklir Nasional, BATAN) (Indonesian: Sekolah Tinggi Teknologi Nuklir - Badan Tenaga Atom Nasional, STTN-BATAN), the primary training facility of BATAN. After BATAN dissolution, the polytechnics inherited by BRIN. It officially renamed as Politeknik Teknologi Nuklir (Poltek TN) on 30 October 2021. Since its foundation in 1985, the polytechnic had graduated more than its 1,300 graduates, which many of its graduates absorbed into BATAN and BAPETEN (mostly), with few of its graduates went to academia, health institutions, industries, and other private sectors and entrepreneurs.

It is one among a few of nuclear higher education institutions in Indonesia. Currently, Indonesia only had 4 places for nuclear higher education in Indonesia: Poltek TN, Gadjah Mada University, Bandung Institute of Technology, and State Intelligence College.

== History ==
=== Pendidikan Ahli Tenaga Nuklir (PATN) ===
On 1982, a plan for establishing specialized nuclear education and training program was formulated by Director General of BATAN and Chief of BATAN Education and Training Center. In January 1983, Director General of BATAN Decree No. 08/DJ/07/I/1983 issued and inaugurated Preparation Task Force on Establishment of Pendidikan Ahli Tenaga Nuklir (English: Education Program for Nuclear Power Experts, Indonesian abbreviation: PATN). However, the preparatory process of PATN was quite slow at that time, and the Director General issued extension for the preparatory committee in May 1984 thru Director General of BATAN Decree No. 81/DJ/V/1984. The preparatory committee later finished their work on early 1985 in preparing assets, equipments, hardwares, and software for PATN. In April 1985, Director General of BATAN Decree No. 53/DJ/IV/1985 issued and transferring the preparatory committee to management task force, formally established the institution on PATN. On 3 August 1985, PATN inaugurated by Director General of BATAN at that time, Djali Ahimsa. PATN later gained the approval from the Ministry of Education to operate and granting degrees thru the ministry's Directorate of Higher Education Decree No. 1640/D/O/86 on 15 September 1986.

Until 2001, PATN education program was an associate degree which required to be finished in 3 years (3-years Diploma program, D3 program in Indonesian system of higher education).

=== Sekolah Tinggi Teknologi Nuklir - Badan Tenaga Atom Nasional (STTN-BATAN) ===
In 1998, BATAN started realizing that the associate degree program that it offered for its staff was still not enough to meet national and international standards due to the low academic and technical skills of its graduates in its associate degree program. PATN, as a result of this, has elevated its D3 program to a D4 program (4-year Applied Science Diploma Program, a D4 program in the Indonesian system of higher education). It was in 2001, after extensive preparations, that PATN transformed into a college known as Sekolah Tinggi Teknologi Nuklir - Badan Tenaga Atom Nasional, STTN-BATAN.

=== Politeknik Teknologi Nuklir (Poltek TN) ===
Around end of 2020, BATAN at that time prepared to elevate STTN-BATAN status to a polytechnic. The recommendation approval also obtained from Nadiem Makarim, the Minister of Education, Culture, Research, and Technology, thru Minister of Education, Culture, Research, and Technology Decision No. 3752/D/OT/2020 on 30 December 2020. However, amidst the process, BATAN liquidated into BRIN, resulted the further processes inherited and executed by BRIN. On 29 June 2021, Tjahjo Kumolo approved change of STTN-BATAN from college to polytechnic status thru Ministry of State Apparatus Utilization and Bureaucratic Reform Decree No. B/642/M.KT.01/2021. On 28 October 2021, coincided with 93rd anniversary of Youth Pledge, Laksana Tri Handoko issued Head of BRIN Decree No. 13/2021, officially turning STTN-BATAN into Poltek TN. It officially renamed as Politeknik Teknologi Nuklir (Poltek TN) on 30 October 2021 in an inauguration ceremony.

During the inauguration ceremony, Laksana Tri Handoko announced that future Poltek TN, will provide programs for applied master and applied PhD programs. Until the date of Poltek TN establishment in 2021, the only highest available degree that able to be taken for Nuclear Sciences in Indonesia is only Master of Nuclear Sciences and Engineering offered at Faculty of Machinery Engineering and Aviation, Bandung Institute of Technology.

== Organizational structure ==
The Organizational Structure of Poltek TN as in Chairman of BRIN Decree No. 13/2021:

1. Senate
2. Advisory Council
3. Director
4. Vice Director of Academic Affairs
5. Vice Director of General Administration
6. Vice Director of Students Affairs, Alumni, and Cooperation
7. Internal Supervisory Unit
8. Division of Human Resources, Finance, and State Property
  1. Subdivision of State Property Management
9. Department of Nuclear Technophysics
  1. Electronics and Instrumentation Program
  2. Electromechanics Program
10. Department of Nuclear Technochemistry
11. Center of Quality Assurance and Academic Development
12. Center of Institutional Research and Community Service
13. Technical Implementing Units
  1. Integrated Basic Science Laboratories Unit
  2. Integrated Applied Science Laboratories Unit
  3. Integrated Application of Nuclear Science and Technology Laboratories Unit
  4. Library Unit
  5. Technology, Information, and Communication Unit
  6. Language Unit
  7. Engineering, Safety, and Radiation Protection Unit
  8. Character and Career Development Unit

== Academic departments ==
The Polytechnic currently consisted of 2 academic departments:

1. Department of Nuclear Technophysics
  1. Electronics and Instrumentation Program
  2. Electromechanics Program
2. Department of Nuclear Technochemistry
