= I Gede Wenten =

Indonesian Chemical Engineer

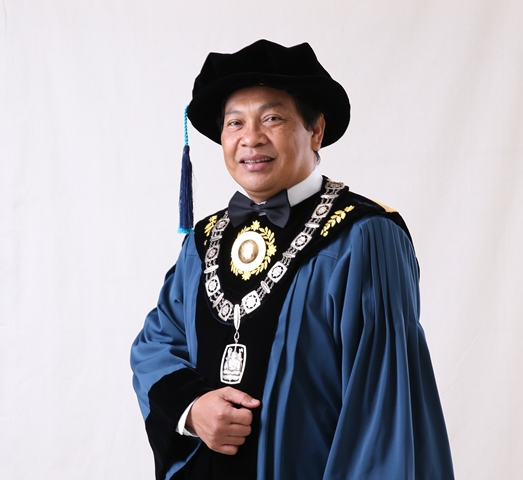

Member of National Research and Innovation Agency Steering Committee
- Incumbent
- Assumed office 13 October 2021
- President: Joko Widodo
- Head of Steering Committee: Megawati Soekarnoputri

Personal details
- Born: February 15, 1962 (age 64) Buleleng, Bali, Indonesia
- Party: Independent
- Education: Bandung Institute of Technology (Ir.); Technical University of Denmark (M.Sc., Ph.D.); Padjadjaran University (M.H.)
- Occupation: Professor, Chemical Engineer, Inventor

I Gede Wenten, renowned to be called colloquially as Wenten, or Prof. Wenten is an Indonesian Professor of Chemical Engineering affiliated with Bandung Institute of Technology (ITB) specialized in membrane technology and also an inventor. He is a pioneer of membrane technology research in Indonesia.

== Early life and education ==
I Gede Wenten born as son of Made Sarta, a fisherman from Buleleng Village in Buleleng, Bali, Indonesia. I Gede Wenten hailed from a big family with him born as last child of 11 siblings. Despite hardly meeting their needs, his father was a dedicated person and tried as best to fulfill the education of his children. I Gede Wenten later went to Bandung to enroll at department of chemistry engineering at ITB in 1982. He later graduated as chemical engineer in 1987. He went to Technical University of Denmark for continuing his education, first as Master of Biotechnology (graduated in 1990), and PhD of Chemical Engineering (graduated in 1995). He also took post-doctoral researcher opportunity at UNESCO Center on Membrane at University of New South Wales.

During his time in Denmark, in 1994 he invented a filtration system for beer-making industry. He patented his invention. His invention also resulted him to be awarded with Suttle Award from The Filtration Society London on 20 September 1994.

He was appointed as professor in 2014. Despite reaching his professorship, he still learning and even taking another degree. In 2015 he obtained a master's degree in law from Padjadjaran University. Later, in 2017 he obtained highest professional degree of engineers in Indonesia, Insinyur Profesional Utama (IPU) from the Indonesian Engineers Association.

== Appointments ==
He was appointed as vice rector for research and innovation in ITB for 2020 - 2025. On 13 October 2021, he appointed as Member of National Research and Innovation Agency (BRIN) Steering Committee by Joko Widodo. The appointment resulted in his vice-rectorship period ended early for new assignment.

During his careers in ITB he appointed in various capacity in academics and private sectors, namely:

- Researcher at Biosep Research Center RPI, New York (April - Oct 1991)
- Expert Staffs at X-Flow B.V.-The Netherlands (Jan 1993 - Dec 1994)
- Post-doctoral Researcher at UNESCO Center on Membrane, UNSW (Jan - May 1995)
- Professor in Chemical Engineering ITB (2014–present)
- International Expert of Institute of Hydrogen Economy, Universiti Teknologi Malaysia (2014–present)
- Head of Expert Group on Chemical Engineering Process Design & Development, ITB (2015 - 2021)
- IPU-rank Engineer (2017–present)
- Senior Supervisor of Medco – Indonesia (March 2018 – present)
- Visiting Professor on National University of Singapore Membrane Reactor Laboratory (June - December 2019)
- Vice Rector for Research and Innovation ITB (January 2020 - October 2021)
- Member of Steering Committee of BRIN (October 2021 – present)
