= Research Organization for Aeronautics and Space =

Indonesian research organization

- Organisasi Riset Penerbangan dan Antariksa (ORPA)

Agency overview
- Formed: 1 September 2021; 1 March 2022 (current form)
- Preceding agency: National Institute of Aeronautics and Space
- Jurisdiction: Indonesia
- Agency executive: Robertus Heru Triharjanto, Head of ORPA
- Parent agency: National Research and Innovation Agency

The Research Organization for Aeronautics and Space (Indonesian: Organisasi Riset Penerbangan dan Antariksa, ORPA) is one of the research organizations under the umbrella of the National Research and Innovation Agency (Badan Riset dan Inovasi Nasional, BRIN). It was founded on 1 September 2021 as the successor of the National Institute of Aeronautics and Space (Lembaga Penerbangan dan Antariksa Nasional, LAPAN) following the liquidation of LAPAN into BRIN.

== History ==
Founded on 1 September 2021 as ORPA (Organisasi Riset Penerbangan dan Antariksa), ORPA was transformation of LAPAN after the liquidation of LAPAN into BRIN. As research organization of BRIN, as outlined in Article 175 and Article 176 of Chief of BRIN Decree No. 1/2021, every Research Organizations under BRIN are responsible and answered to Chief of BRIN. It also prescribed that the Research Organizations consisted with Head of Research Organizations, Centers, and Laboratories/Study Groups. For the transitional period, as in Article 210 of Chairman of BRIN Decree No. 1/2021 mandated, the structure of ORPA follows the preceding structure that already established during its time in LAPAN. Due to this, the temporary structure of ORPA largely follows the Chief of LAPAN Decree No. 1/2021.

On 22 September 2021, ORPA constituting document, Chairman of BRIN Decree No. 5/2021, signed by Laksana Tri Handoko and fully published on 8 October 2021. In the constituting document, it is revealed ORPA retained LAPAN old name. LAPAN acronym however, no longer translated as "Lembaga Penerbangan dan Antariksa Nasional", it just simply "LAPAN", preserving historical LAPAN name. Thus, the organization name become "ORPA-LAPAN".

On 24 January 2022, part of ORPA-LAPAN, Atmospheric Sciences and Technology Center, was transferred to Research Organization for Earth Sciences and Maritime. Aside of the transfer, ORPA-LAPAN structure also slimmed. The change was effective from 1 February 2022 and finalized on 1 March 2022 by Chairman of BRIN Decree No. 5/2022. The organization name reverted again to ORPA and removing its "LAPAN" name through Chairman of BRIN Decree No. 5/2022, backdated from 25 February 2022.

On 19 December 2023, Research Center for Remote Sensing Technology of ORPA transformed into Research Center for Geo-Informatics by Chairman of BRIN Decree No. 14/2023. and Chairman of BRIN Decree No.18/2023 .

== Duties and functions ==
The Aviation and Space Research Organisation has the task of carrying out technical tasks of research, development, assessment, and application, as well as inventions and innovations in the field of aviation and space in accordance with the provisions of laws and regulations. In carrying out this task, ORPA carries out the following functions:

1. preparation of programme and budget plans;
2. implementation of technical tasks of research, development, assessment, and application, as well as invention and innovation in the field of aviation and space;
3. providing technical guidance and supervision;
4. implementation of cooperation;
5. providing scientific recommendations or scientific responses;
6. monitoring, evaluation, and reporting;
7. implementation of financial, administrative, and housekeeping affairs; and
8. implementation of other functions assigned by the Head of BRIN.

== Organizational structure ==
Each Research Centre consists of Activity Groups tasked with scientific fields and/or expertise in the implementation of technical tasks of research, development, assessment, and application, as well as inventions and innovations in the field of aviation and space and the implementation of space in accordance with statutory provisions. In its implementation, research activities are carried out by researchers in 4 Research Centers within ORPA. The four Research Centers are:

=== Space Research Centre ===
The Space Research Centre has the task of carrying out technical tasks of research, development, assessment, and application, as well as invention and innovation, and the Implementation of Space in the field of space.

==== Research Group ====
===== Sun and Activity Research Group =====
Research focuses on solar activity that impacts Earth (flares, CMEs, CH, etc.) and its propagation in interplanetary space. The research aims to understand the physical processes of activity occurring on the Sun and how to predict its impact on Earth by utilizing new methods, one of which is intelligence systems.

===== Ionosphere and Radio Wave Propagation Research Group =====
Research focuses on the impact on high technology in the Earth environment (navigation and communication). Research is conducted in the form of understanding space phenomena that have an impact on technology related to stakeholders.

===== Astronomy and Observatory Research Group =====
Chaired by Thomas Djamaluddin, research focuses on strengthening astronomy and astrophysics research, technical development and conservation of the area around the observatory, and astronomy for the community.

===== Space Environment Dynamics Research Group =====
Research focuses on the dynamics of processes in interplanetary space down to the Earth's environment. Research explores fundamental processes in interplanetary space that impact Earth.

==== Services ====
The Centre for Space Research provides global space weather prediction and information services, as part of Indonesia's contribution to ISES (International Space Environment Services).

- SWIFTS

== Structure ==
As the latest Chairman of BRIN Decree No. 14/2023, the current structure of ORPA is as follows:

1. Office of the Head of ORPA
2. Research Center for Space
3. Research Center for Aeronautics Technology
4. Research Center for Satellite Technology
5. Research Center for Rocket Technology
6. Research Groups

== List of heads ==
No.	Head	Took office	Left office	Title
1	Erna Sri Adiningsih	1 September 2021	4 March 2022	Acting Head of ORPA-LAPAN
2	Robertus Heru Triharjanto	4 March 2022	Incumbent	Head of ORPA
