= Research Organization for Social Sciences and Humanities =

Indonesian research organization

- Organisasi Riset Ilmu Pengetahuan Sosial dan Humaniora (OR-IPSH)
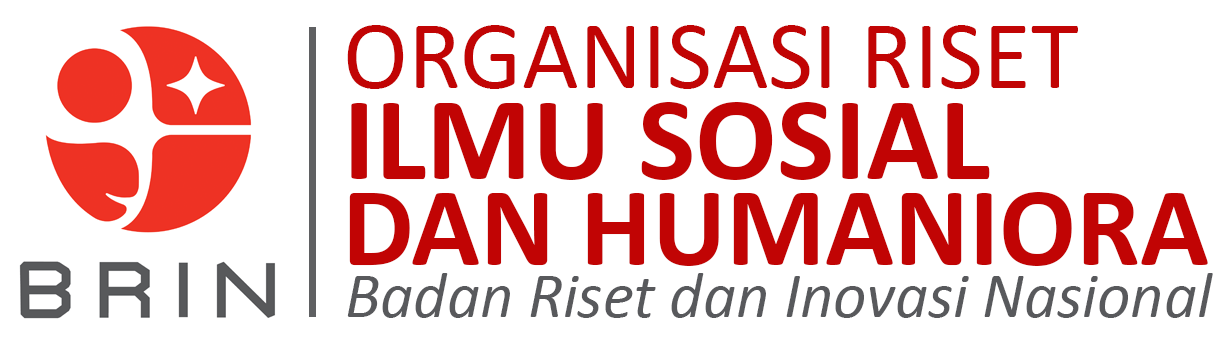
- Logo of OR-IPSH

Agency overview
- Formed: 1 September 2021; 1 March 2022 (current form)
- Preceding agency: see Preceding Agencies
- Jurisdiction: Indonesia
- Agency executive: Ahmad Najib Burhani, Chairman of OR-IPSH
- Parent agency: National Research and Innovation Agency
- Website: https://ipsh.brin.go.id/

The Research Organization for Social Sciences and Humanities (Indonesian: Organisasi Riset Ilmu Pengetahuan Sosial dan Humaniora, OR-IPSH), but goes by name Institute of Social Sciences and Humanities-BRIN or ISSH-BRIN, is one of Research Organizations under the umbrella of the National Research and Innovation Agency (Badan Riset dan Inovasi Nasional, BRIN). It was founded on 1 September 2021 as transformation of Deputy IV (Social Sciences and Humanities) of Indonesian Institute of Sciences (Lembaga Ilmu Pengetahuan Indonesia, LIPI) after the liquidation of LIPI into BRIN.

On 24 January 2022, it is announced that the organization extended with fusion of elements from various elements from General Secretariat of People's Consultative Assembly, General Secretariat of Regional Representative Council, General Secretariat of People's Representative Council, former Agency for Research and Development and Book Affairs of the Ministry of Education and Culture (now Ministry of Education, Culture, Research and Technology), Ministry of Law and Human Rights, Ministry of Religious Affairs, National Population and Family Planning Agency, Ministry of Agrarian Affairs and Spatial Planning/National Land Agency. Total number of researchers at this institute is around 400 people.

== History ==
Founded on 1 September 2021, OR-IPSH is transformation of Deputy IV (Social Sciences and Humanities) of LIPI after the liquidation of LIPI into BRIN. As a research organization of BRIN, as outlined in Article 175 and Article 176 of Chief of BRIN Decree No. 1/2021, every Research Organizations under BRIN are responsible and answered to Chief of BRIN. It also prescribed that the Research Organizations consisted with Head of Research Organizations, Centers, and Laboratories/Study Groups. For the transitional period, as in Article 210 of Chief of BRIN Decree No. 1/2021 mandated, the structure of OR-IPSH follows the preceding structure that already established during its time in LIPI. Due to this, the structure of ORIPSH follows the Chief of LIPI Decree No. 24/2020.

On 22 September 2021, OR-IPSH constituting document, Chief of BRIN Decree No. 10/2021, signed by Laksana Tri Handoko and fully published on 8 October 2021.

On 24 January 2022, it is announced that the organization extended with fusion from various elements for former research and development of various governmental agencies, significantly expanding the structure of OR-IPSH. The new structure will be effective from 1 February 2022. OR-IPSH formation is finalized on 1 March 2022 and is functional since 4 March 2022 since inauguration of its first head, Ahmad Najib Burhani.

== Preceding agencies ==
Based on the structure of the current OR-IPSH, the preceding agencies of the OR-IPSH were:

1. Center for Research and Development of the National Population and Family Planning Agency
2. Center for Development and Standardization of Agrarian Affairs and Spatial Planning Policies of the Ministry of Agrarian Affairs and Spatial Planning/National Land Agency
3. General Secretariat of People's Consultative Assembly
4. General Secretariat of Regional Representative Council
5. General Secretariat of People's Representative Council
6. Agency for Law and Human Rights Research and Development of the Ministry of Law and Human Rights
7. former Agency for Research and Development and Book Affairs of the Ministry of Education and Culture
8. Research, Development, Education, and Training Agency of the Ministry of Religious Affairs

== Structure ==
As the latest Chairman of BRIN Decree No. 19/2023, the structure of ORIPSH is as follow:

1. Office of the Chairman of OR-IPSH
2. Research Center for Society and Culture
3. Research Center for Politics
4. Research Center for Population
5. Research Center for Area Studies
6. Research Center for Law
7. Research Center for Education
8. Research Center for Religion and Beliefs
9. Research Groups

== List of heads ==
No.	Head	Took office	Left office	Title
1	Ahmad Najib Burhani	1 September 2021	4 March 2022	Acting Head of ORIPSH
1	Ahmad Najib Burhani	4 March 2022	6 January 2025	Head of ORIPSH
-	Yan Rianto	7 January 2025	Incumbent	Acting Head of ORIPSH
