= Arif Satria (academic) =

Indonesian agricultural economist

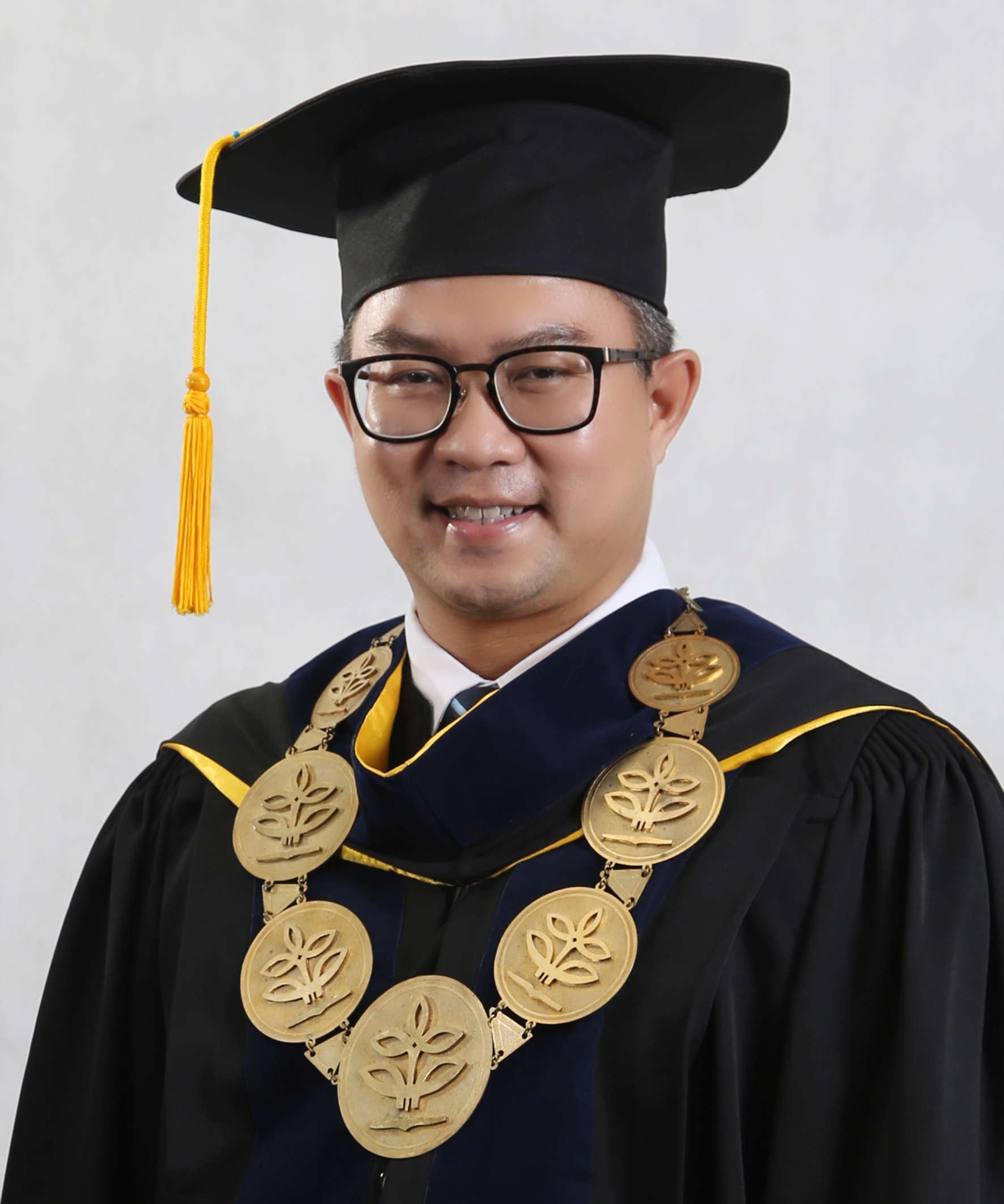

3rd Chairman of National Research and Innovation Agency
- Incumbent
- Assumed office 10 November 2025
- President: Prabowo Subianto
- Preceded by: Laksana Tri Handoko (as Chairman of BRIN)

Personal details
- Born: Arif Satria; 17 September 1971 (age 55) Pekalongan, Central Java, Indonesia
- Spouse: Retna Widyawati
- Education: Bogor Agricultural Institute (B.Sc, M.Sc.); Kagoshima University (Dr.)

Arif Satria is an Indonesian agricultural economist, former IPB University rector, and currently 3rd Chairman of National Research and Innovation Agency (BRIN) since 10 November 2025.

== Early life and education ==
Arif Satria born to Faruk Hasan and Sri Utami, as second child from three. He took his primary education from Islam Elementary School 2 of Pekalongan (SD Islam 2 Pekalongan) graduated in 1984 and junior high from Islam Junior High School of Pekalongan (SMP Islam Pekalongan) graduated in 1987. He later went to Muhammadiyah Senior High School of Pekalongan (SMA Muhammadiyah Pekalongan) for senior high and graduated in 1990.

After finishing his primary and secondary education in his hometown Pekalongan, Arif went to IPB University, which at that time known as Bogor Agricultural Institute, and enrolled the Department of Agricultural Social and Economics in 1990 and graduated in 1995 as bachelor's in agricultural extension. He later went for master's degree in Village Sociology under Department of Communication Sciences and Community Development in same university and graduated in 1999. He took his PhD in Marine Policies from the Department of Marine Social Science, Kagoshima University, graduated in 2006. He was head of student representative during his junior high school period. During his university student period, he was a member of Muslim Students' Association and was became one of Presidium of the Bogor Agricultural Institute Student Senate.

== Career ==
He joined to Bogor Agricultural Institute as lecturer in Department of Fishery Social and Economics in 1997. When he became lecturer, he became a member of the Indonesian Association of Muslim Intellectuals. He rose rank to become the Dean of Faculty of Human Ecology in 2010, which he held until 2017. He later became Rector of IPB University from 2017 to 2022 and 2023-2028 period until his appointment as Chairman of BRIN in 2025.

== Personal life ==
Arif is married to Retna Widyawati. Together, they had two children: Zafran Akhmadery Arif and Sweetyandari Nidya Areefa.

Arif is Muhammadiyah cadre and is a member of the Board of Experts of the Muhammadiyah Council of Higher Education, Research, and Development which overseer the Muhammadiyah-run universities and research centers for 2022-2027 period.
