= Research Organization for Archaeology, Language, and Literature =

Indonesian research organization

- Organisasi Riset Arkeologi, Bahasa, dan Sastra (ORARBASTRA)

Agency overview
- Formed: 1 March 2022
- Preceding agencies: National Archaeology Research Institute; Agency for Research and Development and Book Affairs of the Ministry of Education and Culture; Research, Development, Education, and Training Agency of the Ministry of Religious Affairs; Bureau for Checking Copies of the Quran of the Ministry of Religious Affairs
- Jurisdiction: Indonesia
- Agency executive: Herry Jogaswara, Acting Head of ORARBASTRA
- Parent agency: National Research and Innovation Agency

The Research Organization for Archaeology, Language, and Literature (Indonesian: Organisasi Riset Arkeologi, Bahasa, dan Sastra, ORARBASTRA) is one of Research Organizations under the umbrella of the National Research and Innovation Agency (Badan Riset dan Inovasi Nasional, BRIN). On 24 January 2022, the formation of the agency was announced, and it was scheduled to be established on 1 February 2022. The agency resulted from amalgamation of National Archaeology Research Institute, the former Agency for Research and Development and Book Affairs of the Ministry of Education and Culture, part of Research, Development, Education, and Training Agency of the Ministry of Religious Affairs, and Bureau for Checking Copies of the Quran of the Ministry of Religious Affairs.

ORARBASTRA was inaugurated on 1 March 2022 through Chairman of BRIN Decree No. 12/2022, backdated from 25 February 2022.

The agency is currently led by Herry Jogaswara in acting head capacity.

== Structure ==
The structure of ORARBASTRA is as follows:

1. Office of the Head of ORABSTRA
2. Research Center for Prehistoric and Historic Archaeology
3. Research Center for Environmental Archaeology, Maritime Archaeology, and Cultural Sustainability
4. Research Center for Archaeometry
5. Research Center for Language and Literatures Preservation
6. Research Center for Language, Letters, and Community
7. Research Center for Manuscripts, Literature, and Oral Traditions
8. Research Center for Treasures of Religion and Civilization
9. Research Groups

Aside of these research centers, ORARBASTRA also inherited National Archaeology Research Institute branch offices.

1. National Archaeology Center Yogyakarta Branch
2. National Archaeology Center Denpasar Branch
3. National Archaeology Center Bandung Branch
4. National Archaeology Center Palembang Branch
5. National Archaeology Center Manado Branch
6. National Archaeology Center Medan Branch
7. National Archaeology Center Banjarmasin Branch
8. National Archaeology Center Makassar Branch
9. National Archaeology Center Ambon Branch
10. National Archaeology Center Jayapura Branch
