= Mohamad Nasir =

Indonesian politician and professor

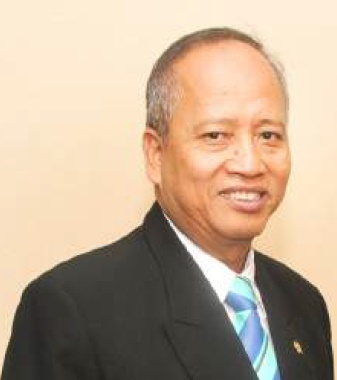

12th Minister of Research, Technology and Higher Education
- In office 27 October 2014 – 20 October 2019
- President: Joko Widodo
- Preceded by: Gusti Muhammad Hatta (Note: As Minister of Research and Technology)
- Succeeded by: Bambang Brodjonegoro

Personal details
- Born: 27 June 1960 (age 65) Paron, Indonesia
- Profession: Professor; Politician

Mohamad Nasir (born 27 June 1960, in Paron District, Indonesia) is an Indonesian politician and professor. He served as Minister of Research, Technology and Higher Education in the Working Cabinet between 2014 and 2019. He was appointed by President Joko Widodo on 27 October 2014, replacing Gusti Muhammad Hatta. He was rector-elect of Diponegoro University in Indonesia and was supposed to be sworn in on 18 December 2014.

== Early life and education ==
Mohamad Nasir was born in Paron, Ngawi. He was raised in Rembang, Indonesia where he lived with his parents. Nasir schooled at Pondok Pesantren Al-Islah. He then studied economics at the Diponegoro University, where he obtained a BSc in economics (1983–1988). In 1993 he obtained a Master of Science from Gadjah Mada University. He also has a PhD in accounting from the Universiti Sains Malaysia (USM).

== Career ==
Nasir began his career as a professor at the Diponegoro University, where he was also dean of the Masters of Accounting Program in the Faculty of Economics. He was appointed vice rector of the Diponegoro University between 2006 and 2010. In 2010, he was appointed dean in the Faculty of Economics and Business. In early 2014 after serving as dean for four years, he was appointed rector of Diponegoro University and was said to sworn in officially on 18 December 2014.

On 27 October 2014, he was appointed minister by President Joko Widodo several weeks before his official swearing in as rector of Diponegoro University. He was assigned to the portfolio of Minister of Research, Technology, and Higher Education.

== Controversy ==
Nasir Muhammad at the beginning of 2016 had issued an idiotic, hateful, and controversial statement against the lesbian, gay, bisexual, and transgender (LGBT). He questioned the existence of counseling support organization and resource center on Sexuality Studies at the University of Indonesia, the group was said to be an organization rather than a group of students LGBT support group for LGBT and reviewing studies of gender and sexual orientation diversity. Nasir had issued a statement banning LGBT on campus. The debate spread to the existence of LGBT people in Indonesia itself to their judgment, and the prohibition of expulsion, violence, intimidation and protests against the LGBT. However, the statement on banning “LGBT on campus” was then denied. Later on 26 January 2016, the minister of education, Nasir stated that LGBT individuals are allowed to be students of Indonesian campuses. Nasir asserted that he has no problem with LGBT-related things on campus. Nasir added, for the issue of public displays of affection, not only that it is discouraged for same-sex couples, but also all parties who use the campus as a location for public displays of affection. According to him, if LGBT activities are related to educational consultation and research, it is not a problem because academic rights are not limited.

== Notes ==
Political offices
Preceded by Gusti Muhammad Hatta as Minister of Research and Technology	Minister of Research, Technology and Higher Education; 2014–2019	Succeeded by Bambang Brodjonegoro as Minister of Research and Technology
