= Bambang Brodjonegoro =

Indonesian economist and politician

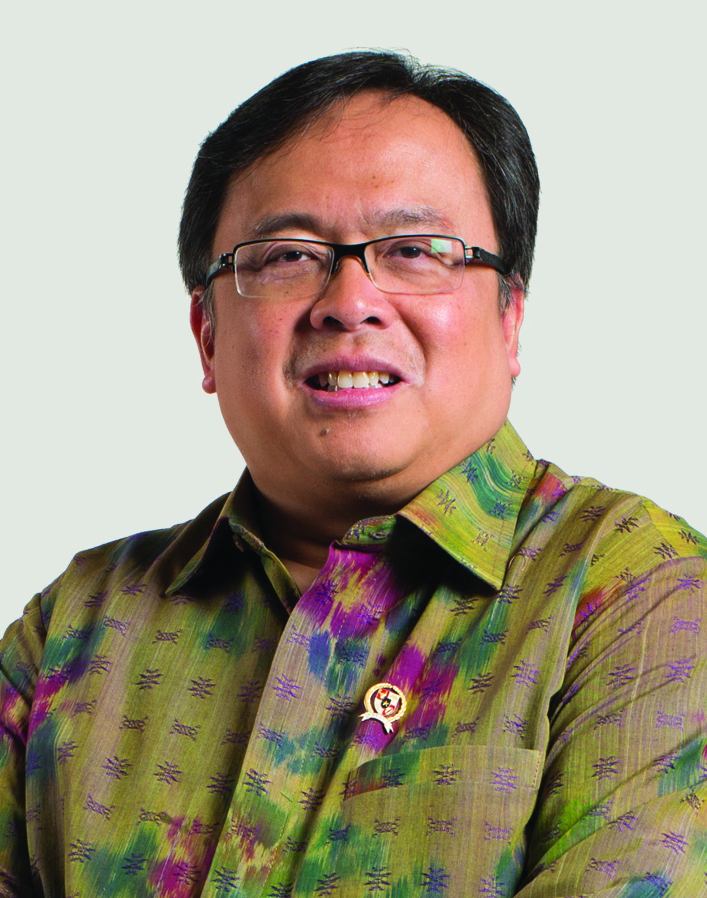
- Official portrait, 2016

13th Minister of Research and Technology
- In office 23 October 2019 – 28 April 2021
- President: Joko Widodo
- Preceded by: Mohamad Nasir
- Succeeded by: Nadiem Makarim (as Minister of Education, Culture, Research, and Technology)

1st Chairman of National Research and Innovation Agency
- In office 23 October 2019 – 28 April 2021
- President: Joko Widodo
- Preceded by: Office created
- Succeeded by: Laksana Tri Handoko

15th Minister of National Development Planning
- In office 27 July 2016 – 20 October 2019
- President: Joko Widodo
- Preceded by: Sofyan Djalil
- Succeeded by: Suharso Monoarfa

29th Minister of Finance
- In office 27 October 2014 – 27 July 2016
- President: Joko Widodo
- Preceded by: Muhamad Chatib Basri
- Succeeded by: Sri Mulyani

8th Vice Minister of Finance
- In office 3 October 2013 – 20 October 2014
- President: Susilo Bambang Yudhoyono
- Minister: Muhamad Chatib Basri
- Preceded by: Mahendra Siregar
- Succeeded by: Mardiasmo

Personal details
- Born: 3 October 1966 (age 59) Jakarta, Indonesia
- Party: Independent
- Education: University of Indonesia; University of Illinois at Urbana–Champaign

Bambang Permadi Soemantri Brodjonegoro is an Indonesian economist. He was the Minister of Research and Technology/National Research and Innovation Agency of the Republic of Indonesia. Previously, he was the Minister of National Development Planning of Indonesia, taking office after a cabinet reshuffle by President Joko Widodo

From 27 October 2014 to 27 July 2016, he was the Finance Minister of Indonesia in the Working Cabinet also under President Joko Widodo's administration.

Under Susilo Bambang Yudhoyono's administration, he was the deputy finance minister in the Second United Indonesia Cabinet.

== Early life ==
Born in Jakarta, he is the son of Professor Sumantri Brodjoneogoro, a former Rector of the University of Indonesia and minister of education and culture in 1973. Bambang Brodjonegoro completed his study at the Economics Faculty of Universitas Indonesia in 1990. The next year, Bambang studied for a master's degree at the University of Illinois at Urbana–Champaign, United States, continuing to doctoral program completed in 1997.

== Career ==
As an academician, he began his career as a lecturer at the University of Indonesia's faculty of economy and became the chair of the economics department in the faculty. He also served as a member of the board of commissioners of the State Electricity Company. During his tenure as a lecturer, Bambang developed postgraduate program in his department as well as double degree partnerships with the Australian National University and a Dutch university.

In March 2005, Bambang became the nominee for the faculty's dean, along with Rhenald Kasali from the management department and Siddharta Utama from the accounting department. Despite being the youngest candidate, Bambang was selected by UI rector Usman Chatib Warsa following an assessment process on 10 March. His selection was responded positively by alumni and faculty members, including alumni chairman Arwin Rasjid, who "pledged support from 12,000 alumni", and chief secretary to the vice president Prijono Tjiptoherijanto who expected that "the new dean can restore the faculty's prestige and excellence". During the assessment, Bambang emphasized an open-minded, committed, and forward-looking leadership and promised academic services reforms in online registration system, teaching incentives, innovative methods, academic support facilities, as well as global and market-aligned curriculum. He was installed as dean on 21 March 2005 and was the-then university's youngest dean at the age of 38.

In 2009, he became the director-general of the Islamic Research and Training Institute (IRTI), Islamic Development Bank Group, located in Jeddah, The Kingdom of Saudi Arabia. After two years as The director-general of IRTI, he was appointed as the chairman of The Fiscal Policy Agency, Ministry of Finance, The Republic of Indonesia in 2011. He then was then promoted to the vice-minister of finance during Susilo Bambang Yudoyono's presidency.

In October 2014, he was inaugurated as finance minister in President Joko Widodo's first cabinet. During his tenure, he initiated Indonesia's first tax amnesty scheme. Bambang Brodjonegoro also designed an improved budget spending by allocating the very first direct transfer to all 74,000 villages in Indonesia.

On 23 October 2019, he was appointed as minister of research and technology, a post he was co-held with the head of the National Research and Innovation Agency, under Presidential Decision No. 113/P/2019. He holds the post until April 2021. On 9 April 2021, Bambang Brodjonegoro announced his departure at an event at Hasanuddin University and told the audience the visit would be the last event he attended in his capacity as the minister and head of BRIN. On 10 April 2021, Bambang Brodjonegoro reported resigned from his positions as the minister and head of BRIN. On 28 April 2021, Nadiem Makarim was inaugurated as the new minister for the Ministry of Education, Culture, Research, and Technology, and Laksana Tri Handoko was appointed as the new head of the National Research and Innovation Agency, effectively ending the ministry and his time as minister.

After no longer becoming minister, Bambang Brodjonegoro established his own executive office to manage his post-ministerial activities and disseminate his works and thoughts around May 2021. He returned to academia and became head of the Council of Professors of Faculty of Economy and Business University of Indonesia shortly after that. He also appointed and trusted to become independent commissioner in national companies such as Bukalapak (appointed 1 May 2021), Telkom (appointed 28 May 2021), Astra International (appointed 17 June 2021), TBS Energi Utama (appointed 18 June 2021), Oligo Infrastructure (appointed 1 July 2021), and Indofood (appointed 27 August 2021).

== Honors and awards ==
=== Scholarships and fellowships ===
- Mahasiswa Berprestasi Universitas Indonesia (University of Indonesia Outstanding Students Award) (1989).
- Academic scholarship awarded by the Indonesian Government - HED (August 1991 - December 1995).
- Visiting fellow, The Institute of East Asian Studies, Thammasat University, Thailand (1999).
- ISEAS-World Bank Research Fellowship Award (as visiting research fellow), The Institute of Southeast Asian Studies, Singapore (1999).
- Eisenhower Fellowships, The Single Region Program – Southeast Asia, USA (2002).
- Visiting fellow, The Indonesia Project – Australian National University (ANU), Canberra, Australia (2004).

=== Awards ===
- Bintang Mahaputera Utama (3rd class) (2014)
- Ganesa Prajamanggala Bakti Adiutama from Bandung Institute of Technology (2018)
- Madhuri and Jagdish N. Sheth International Alumni Award for Exceptional Achievement from University of Illinois Urbana-Champaign (2020)

=== Honorary degree ===
On 3 July 2021, Bandung Institute of Technology (ITB) awarded honorary degree on occasion of 101 years anniversary event to Bambang Brodjonegoro. He was one of three people awarded by ITB in auspicious occasion. He awarded with doctor honoris causa degree in Urban Planning. Together with him, Sam Bimbo [id], an Islamic religious musician, and I Nyoman Nuarta, the chief architect of Garuda Wisnu Kencana statue and Garuda Wisnu Kencana Cultural Park, also awarded doctor honoris causa degree with Sam Bimbo in Music, and Nuarta in Fine Arts, respectively. Bambang Brodjonegoro is only awardee who is not ITB alumni on that occasion, while two others are alumni of ITB. (Sam Bimbo and Nuarta were from Faculty of Fine Arts, with Sam Bimbo graduated in 1968, and Nuarta graduated in 1979).

== Notes ==
Political offices
| Preceded by Mahendra Siregar | Vice Minister of Finance; 2013–2014 | Succeeded by Mardiasmo |
| Preceded by Muhamad Chatib Basri | Minister of Finance; 2014–2016 | Succeeded by Sri Mulyani |
| Preceded by Sofyan Djalil | Minister of National Development Planning; 2016–2019 | Succeeded by Suharso Monoarfa |
| Preceded by Mohamad Nasir | Minister of Research and Technology; 2019–2021 | Succeeded by Nadiem Makarim as Minister of Education, Culture, Research, and Technology |
| Preceded by Position established | Chairman of National Research and Innovation Agency; 2019–2021 | Succeeded by Laksana Tri Handoko |
