= National Archaeology Research Institute (Indonesia) =

- Pusat Penelitian Arkeologi Nasional (Puslit Arkenas)
- Seal of the Ministry of Education, Culture, Research, and Technology, used by its units and agencies, including Puslit Arkenas

Agency overview
- Formed: 14 June 1913
- Preceding agency: Commissie in Nederlandsch Indie voor Oudheidkundige Onderzoek op Java en Madoera
- Dissolved: 1 February 2022
- Superseding agency: Archaeology, Language, and Letters Research Organization of National Research and Innovation Agency
- Jurisdiction: Indonesia
- Agency executive: I Made Geria, Head of Puslit Arkenas
- Parent agency: Ministry of Education, Culture, Research, and Technology
- Website: arkenas.kemdikbud.go.id

The National Archaeology Research Institute (Indonesian: Pusat Penelitian Arkeologi Nasional, Puslit Arkenas) was an Indonesian research center coordinated under the Agency of Education Standards, Curricula, and Assessments (formerly Agency of Research and Development) of the Ministry of Education, Culture, Research, and Technology. It was one of the oldest state research institutions in the country, operating since the early 20th century.

The agency was transferred to the National Research and Innovation Agency and replaced as part of the state research activity integration plan. It was announced on 24 January 2022 that on 1 February, the institute would be amalgamated with various agencies into the newly formed Archaeology, Language, and Letters Research Organization.

== History ==
Puslit Arkenas can trace its origins to the early-20th-century Commissie in Nederlandsch Indie voor Oudheidkundige Onderzoek op Java en Madoera, founded by the Dutch East Indies colonial government on 18 May 1901 through Government Decree No. 4. The commission, led by Jan Laurens Andries Brandes [id], was tasked with cataloging and researching archaeological findings and traditional architecture scattered across Java and the Madura islands. On 14 June 1913, the commission was replaced by the Oudheidkundige Dienst in Nederlandsch-Indie by Presidential Decree No. 62. The Dienst (service agency) was the predecessor of the current Puslit Arkenas. The foundation date of the Dienst became celebrated as Hari Purbakala Nasional (English: national prehistoric day).

After the issue of Presidential Decree No. 62/2021, on the formation of the Ministry of Education, Culture, Research, and Technology, the agency was ordered by president Joko Widodo to be relinquished to the National Research and Innovation Agency (BRIN). The Minister of Education, Culture, Research, and Technology, through Ministry of Education, Culture, Research, and Technology Decree No. 28/2021, also confirmed the relinquishment of the institute to BRIN. The separation was confirmed on 18 November 2021.

== Names ==
As one of the oldest research agencies in Indonesia, the organization had been changed names several times:

1. Oudheidkundige Dienst in Nederlandsch-Indie (1913–1942)
2. Office of Prehistoric Items Registry Affairs (Indonesian: Kantor Urusan Barang – barang Purbakala) (Japanese occupation to early Indonesian Republican government) (1942–1947)
3. Dualism in 1946–1949 between:
  - Office of Prehistoric Items Registry Affairs (under Indonesian Republican government)
  - Oudheidkundige Dienst (under Netherlands Indies Civil Administration)
4. Division of Prehistorical Affairs of the United States of Indonesia Cultural Service (1949–1950)
5. Oudheidkundige Dienst in Indonesië (1951–1953)
6. Prehistoric Service Agency of the Department of Teaching, Education, and Culture (1953–1958)
7. National Prehistoric and Heritage Service (1958–1963/1964) (Indonesian: Dinas Purbakala dan Peninggalan Nasional, DPPN)
8. National Prehistoric and Heritage Institute (1963/1964–1975) (Indonesian: Lembaga Purbakala dan Peninggalan Nasional, LPPN)
9. National Prehistoric and Heritage Research Center (1975–1978) (Indonesian: Pusat Penelitian Purbakala dan Peninggalan Nasional, PusPPPN/PusP3N)
10. National Archaeology Research Institute (Indonesian: Pusat Penelitian Arkeologi Nasional, Puslit Arkenas) (1978–2000)
11. Archaeology Center (Indonesian: Pusat Arkeologi) (2000)
12. Archaeology Research Center of the State Ministry of Cultural Affairs and Tourism (Indonesian: Pusat Penelitian Arkeologi Kementerian Negara Kebudayaan dan Pariwisata) (2000–2003)
13. Assistance Deputyship of National Archaeological Affairs (Indonesian: Keasistendeputian Urusan Arkeologi Nasional) (2003–2011)
14. National Archaeology Research Institute (Indonesian: Pusat Penelitian Arkeologi Nasional, Puslit Arkenas) (name reverted, 2011–present)

As Puslit Arkenas, the institute was subject to being transferred to various parent organizations:

1. Department of Education and Culture (1978–1999)
2. Department of National Education (1999–2000)
3. Department of Cultural Affairs and Tourism (2000–2001)
4. State Ministry of Cultural Affairs and Tourism (2001–2004)
5. Ministry of Cultural Affairs and Tourism (2004–2009)
6. Department of Education and Cultural Affairs (2009)
7. Ministry of National Education (2009–2011)
8. Ministry of Education and Culture (2011–2021)
9. Ministry of Education, Culture, Research, and Technology (2021)
