= National Research and Innovation Agency =

Government agency of Indonesia

National Research and Innovation Agency (BRIN)
- Badan Riset dan Inovasi Nasional

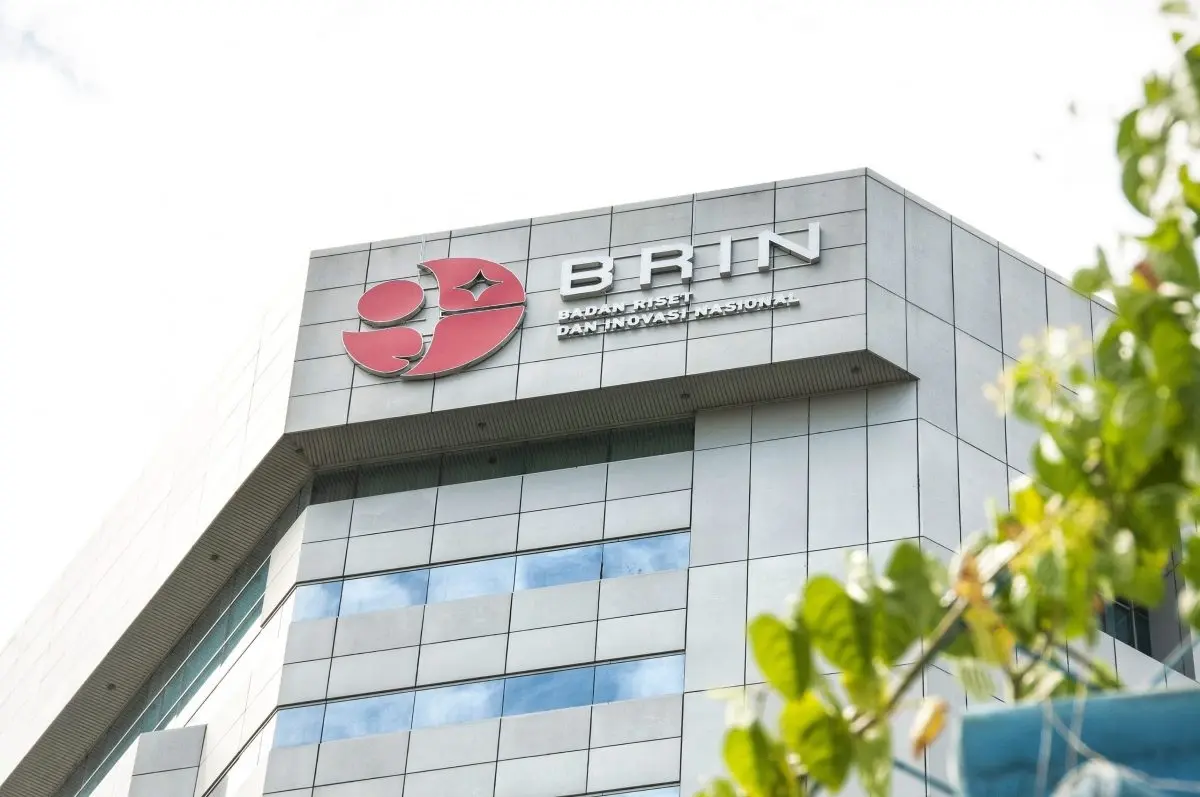
- Headquarters in Jakarta

Agency overview
- Formed: 28 April 2021; 5 years ago
- Jurisdiction: Indonesia
- Headquarters: B.J. Habibie Building, Central Jakarta, Jakarta
- Employees: +14,000
- Annual budget: 736,396,346.27 USD (Rp 10.51 trillion)
- Agency executives: Arif Satria, Chairman; Amarulla Octavian, Deputy Chairman
- Website: www.brin.go.id

The National Research and Innovation Agency (BRIN, Indonesian: Badan Riset dan Inovasi Nasional) is a cabinet-level agency of the Indonesian government, formed in 2019. Originally a new agency attached to the Ministry of Research and Technology, which became the Ministry of Research and Technology/National Research and Innovation Agency, the agency was controversially separated and established as a new non-ministerial government agency directly under the President of Indonesia on 28 April 2021. On 23 August 2021, the agency gained cabinet-level status through enactment of Presidential Decree No. 78/2021. Under the new presidential regulation, it became the sole national research agency of Indonesia.

The agency has been characterized as a "scientific merger company" for its controversial strategy of subsuming many pre-existing scientific agencies. Aswismarmo, an Indonesian scholar and historian, noted that BRIN is a form of "holding research institution". Former BRIN chairman Laksana Tri Handoko claimed that the agency is a "Research Mothership" that houses all the state research activities of Indonesia.

In September 2021, BRIN became a member of the International Science Council.

== History ==
=== Formation ===
On 17 April 2018, President Joko Widodo signed Presidential Decree No. 38/2018 regarding the National Research Main Framework of 2017–2045. The decree was intended to outline national research policies and priorities for sustainable development.

Before BRIN existed, government research and development activities were scattered throughout various ministries and government institutes and were mostly pursuing short term outcomes. Research and development management was also considered ineffective. In 2018, the Corruption Eradication Commission reported that, of national government funding of around 24.92 trillion rupiahs allocated for research (0.25% of Indonesia's GDP), only 43.74% was spent on research and development activities, while the rest went on operational costs (30.68%), service costs (13.17%), capital expenditure (6.65%), and education and training (5.77%). Fictitious research, overlapping research, and misuse and mismanagement of funding was also reported. BRIN was formed with the intent to fix these problems.

In January 2019, BRIN's formation was suggested by former president Megawati Soekarnoputri, leader of the Indonesian Democratic Party of Struggle, in a speech to mark her party's 46th anniversary. She suggested a research and innovation agency to direct and support the national research ecosystem, to promote national self-sufficiency.

On 13 August 2019, Widodo signed Law No. 11 of 2019 concerning the National System of Sciences and Technology, which included an article laying the foundation for BRIN. After winning the election on 23 October 2019, it was announced that BRIN would be attached to the Ministry of Research and Technology. On 24 October 2019, a temporary constituting document was signed, specifying that the organization of BRIN must be fixed within three months.

Bambang Brodjonegoro, the Minister of Research and Technology, failed to set the structure of BRIN by the deadline; an extension was issued to 30 April 2020. This deadline was also missed, creating uncertainty for Indonesian researchers.

The uncertainty was due to conflicts between three ministries: the Ministry of Research and Technology, the Ministry of Law and Human Rights, and the Ministry of State Apparatus Utilization and Bureaucratic Reform. The People's Representative Council requested Widodo to warn the ministries to work together and consolidate their efforts.

Following a restructuring of the ministries in April 2021, BRIN was made a new, separate, non-ministerial agency. Laksana Tri Handoko, the former Chief of the Indonesian Institute of Sciences, was appointed as its chairman.

=== Establishment as Indonesia's sole National Research Agency ===
On 5 May 2021, Widodo signed a new decree which effectively established BRIN as the sole national research agency; all other research agencies—such as the Indonesian Institute of Sciences (LIPI), the Agency for the Assessment and Application of Technology (BPPT), the National Nuclear Energy Agency of Indonesia (BATAN), and the National Institute of Aeronautics and Space (LAPAN)—would be subsumed into BRIN. Regulatory functions remained with the ministry. The decree was not published on the government's official law channel until 29 May 2021, although it had already become known through the media.

The organizational structure of BRIN was greatly expanded by this decree. It was divided into a steering committee and executive. The steering committee's members are, ex-officio, the members of the steering committee of the Pancasila Ideology Development Agency (BPIP); and the chairman of the BPIP steering committee is also chairman of the BRIN steering committee. The executive oversees research and day-to-day activities, as directed by the steering committee, and is headed by the chairman.

The decree also enabled the research and development departments of provincial and city governments to become part of the Regional Research and Innovation Agency (Badan Riset dan Inovasi Daerah) (BRIDA). While BRIDA offices would be responsive to local governments, BRIN would have the power to monitor, control, and evaluate the research in each BRIDA office. The decree mandated the government of every province, regency and township to form its own BRIDA office within 2 years. With 34 provinces, 416 regencies, and 98 townships, 548 BRIDA offices were therefore expected to be formed.

The government allocated Rp 6.6 trillion to fund BRIN in 2022. This funding was later increased to Rp 10.51 trillion.

On 20 September 2021, it was revealed that more than 11,000 employees of the former Ministry of Research and Technology, LIPI, BPPT, LAPAN, and BATAN were being moved from their original institutions to BRIN.

=== BRIN's research and development consolidation plans ===
On 9 June 2021, the chairman of BRIN, Laksana Tri Handoko, announced a plan for BRIN to expand and integrate with ministerial research and development (R&D) divisions. The plan dated back to 2018, when parliament had discussed the Law of National System of Sciences and Technology. In April 2021, President Widodo intended that in the future, the work of national R&D activities would be consolidated within BRIN, to preclude overlapping research efforts. In announcing this plan, BRIN, together with the Ministry of Finance and the Ministry of National Development Planning, prepared 3 options: (1) full integration of ministerial R&D divisions into BRIN, with each ministry fully relinquishing their R&D responsibilities; this plan was the most radical, given the required structural changes, which would be overseen by Ministry of State Apparatus Utilization and Bureaucratic Reform; (2) program transition, with only some of the funding and execution of ministerial R&D programs being relinquished to BRIN; or (3) partial transition, by which only part of the research arms within the ministerial R&D divisions would be relinquished to BRIN, with the staff retaining their place within their originating ministries. The third option was probably offered due to some ministries having their R&D divisions being combined with those concerned with human resources development, such as in the Ministry of Religious Affairs' Research, Development, Education, and Training Agency.

To strengthen BRIN's ability to coordinate all national research with those at the regional and local levels, on 22 July 2021 the Ministry of State Apparatus Utilization and Bureaucratic Reform issued Circular No. B/295/M.SM.02.03/2021 on the reformation and transformation of research resources. The circular was addressed to all state-owned research institutions and regional and local research and development departments, and it mandated that those institutes coordinate their research and development under BRIN, and pushed for the formation of BRIDA offices by no later than 31 December 2022. On 12 August 2021, the Ministry of Home Affairs' Research and Development Agency—along with the Ministry of State Apparatus Utilization and Bureaucratic Reform, BRIN, the National Civil Service Agency, and the National Institute of Public Administration—held a symposium on Research Institution Reformation, where issues relating to research coordination under BRIN were discussed. The issues were: (1) the transfer of human resource from the institutions that were to be subsumed into BRIN, and (2) the difficulties involved in the formation of BRIDA. On the formation of BRIDA, the Ministry of Home Affairs offered its assistance to the regional and local governments in establishing their BRIDA offices.

On 28 August 2021, BRIN, announced plans to cut off and dismantle redundant state research institutions and centers of excellence (COEs) in Indonesia to achieve efficiency in funding. BRIN also developed means to prevent the formation of such institutions in the future, to avoid redundant and needlessly costly research efforts.

On 22 September 2021, the Eijkman Institute for Molecular Biology, a long-time subordinate agency of the Ministry of Research and Technology, officially become subordinate to BRIN. It was announced that it had become a "research unit under the BRIN". The name of the Eijkman Institute was later changed to the Eijkman Molecular Biology Research Center, under the Life Sciences Research Organization of the National Research and Innovation Agency. This was the first BRIN organizational capture after the consolidation.

On 24 January 2022, BRIN announced that eventually 919 state research units from 74 ministries and non-ministerial research arms would be consolidated under the BRIN umbrella. These units would be consolidated to form 104 research centers scattered across 18 research organizations. 12 research organizations would be inaugurated on 1 February 2022 as the first batch of 2022 consolidations.

=== Structural revision ===
Presidential Decree No. 33/2021 clashed with existing laws, and scientists and lawmakers called for a revision of the constituting document. The biggest issues were clashes between Law No. 10/1997 (Nuclear Power) and Law No. 21/2013 (Law of Space), by which BATAN and LAPAN, respectively, were created, not through Presidential Decrees, such as created LIPI, BPPT, and other agencies. On 7 July 2021, the government announced that the presidential decree No. 33/2021 would be superseded and thus change BRIN's operation and structure. The replacement document was still being drafted at the time of the announcement, which did give a glimpse of the future changes. The announcement outlined 5 major points of revision: (1) Changes to the presidential decree's articles that conflicted with preexisting laws; (2) Clarification of the integration mechanisms; (3) Harmonization between BRIN and other scientific and scientific regulatory agencies; (4) Fixing inter-agency coordination issues; (5) Setting up 10 to 11 Technical Implementing Organizations under BRIN. What Technical Implementing Organizations would be subordinated under BRIN was unknown at the time, but there would be some demotions of currently preexisting organizations, and some others would be split off from preexisting organizations. The revision also defended BATAN and LAPAN being dismantled, although some parts of those institutions would join BRIN. Despite that, the said revision planned to clarify the differences between BRIN and the Ministry of Education, Culture, Research and Technology in regulating science in Indonesia. The coordination between these two institutions on research matters with the House of Representatives (DPR) are yet to be made clear. As a result, currently consultation on research matters is split between two different commissions of the DPR.

As part of the bargain made by preexisting agencies with BRIN, agencies subsumed into BRIN would still able to use their old designations when they do business, as the names were used for decades; and some active projects, contracts, and cooperations still retained the old names. For example, LAPAN would become the Aeronautics and Space Research Organization (Organisasi Riset Penerbangan dan Antariksa (ORPA)). Despite being known as ORPA, it can still use LAPAN on preexisting projects, contracts, and cooperations.

On 30 July 2021, Joko Widodo issued Presidential Decree No. 62/2021, the permanent constituting document of Ministry of Education, Culture, Research and Technology, to the government's Legal Documentation Information Network. The decree further cemented the ministry's regulatory oversight with regard to science, research, and technology through formation of the General Directorate of Higher Education, Research, and Technology, a miniaturized version of the Ministry of Research and Technology within the ministry body, not BRIN. While it made clear that BRIN would not have regulatory oversight anymore and vested that function in the ministry, the document still did not yet made clear the coordination between the ministry and BRIN. Nadiem Makarim himself asserted that BRIN is a partner of the ministry in performing research, not subordinate to the ministry.

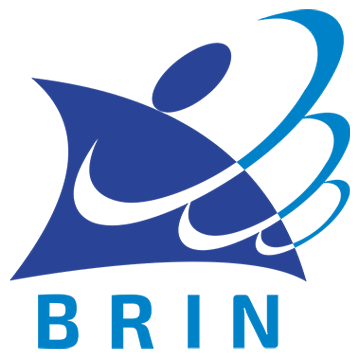
BRIN logo from 28 April 2021 to 10 August 2021

BRIN logo from 10 August 2021

On 10 August 2021, as part of leaving the past, and the legacy of the Ristek era, behind, BRIN introduced a new logo. The change of the logo was announced at the same time of 26th National Technology Awakening Day celebration. The logo was drawn by Triawan Munaf [id], former chief of the Creative Economy Agency of Jokowi's previous Working Cabinet. The new logo was a stylized integration of the previous logos of LIPI, BPPT, LAPAN, and BATAN. At the ceremony, Chairman Handoko announced the finalization of the upcoming draft of the BRIN lineup.

On 24 August 2021, the new BRIN temporary constitutional document, Presidential Decree No. 78/2021, was signed as the replacement to Presidential Decree No. 33/2021; it was published on 1 September 2021. Based on the new decree, the structure of the BRIN steering committee and its staff was overhauled, the Technical Implementing Organizations (now termed simply as Research Organizations) in BRIN were expanded, and the integration mechanism clarified. The new decree did not spare BATAN and LAPAN from disbandment, however; BATAN and LAPAN relinquished their power and rights granted by Law No. 10/1997 (Nuclear Power) and Law No. 21/2013 (Law of Space), respectively, to BRIN. The decree also provided mechanisms for local and regional government to form BRIDA offices. In the old constituting document, BRIDA offices were formed solely by their respective local and regional governments. In the new constituting document, BRIDA formation is jointly managed by local/regional governments and BRIN, with BRIN providing advice to the local government. The BRIDAs can be attached to the local/regional government research and development department. This new arrangement comparatively lessened the managerial burden on local/regional governments. It also better drew the dividing line between BRIN and the Ministry of Education, Culture, Research, and Technology. BRIN inherited much of the former Ministry of Research and Technology, except some responsibilities that had to be left to the new ministry. The decree also reconfigured the office of the Steering Committee, from its membership being drawn solely from BPIP steering committee members to being a mix of people from BPIP, the Ministry of Finance, and the Ministry of National Development and Planning, as well as academicians and professionals. The decree also raised the status of BRIN above that of a mere research and development agency. The decree officially gave BRIN the power and status of a ministerial office, as a cabinet-level agency (termed as Lembaga Setingkat Kementerian). The decree granted the BRIN Steering Committee increased power over BRIN activities and gave it the right to form Executive Assistance Task Forces to assist BRIN executives under "special circumstances". BRIN also required to report its institutional performance biannually to the Steering Committee, and annually reported to the president. On 2 September 2021, acting executive officers of the Research Organizations were inaugurated. With their inauguration, LIPI, BPPT, LAPAN, and BATAN come to the end, but their integration process still continued, with its expected completion pushed back to one year after the enactment of Decree No.78/2021.

On 3 September 2021, BRIN announced that it would be gradually filling positions, in September 2021, December 2021, and March 2022. The size of BRIN was yet to be disclosed to the public; on 6 September 2021, this was publicly made known.

On 13 October 2021, after a period of controversy since May 2021, Megawati Soekarnoputri, Sri Mulyani, Suharso Monoarfa, Sudhamek Agung Waspodo Sunyoto, Emil Salim, I Gede Wenten, Bambang Kesowo, Adi Utarini, Marsudi Wahyu Kisworo, and Tri Mumpuni were inaugurated as BRIN Steering Committee members by President Widodo.

=== Attempt to challenge BRIN status ===
Two researchers, Eko Noer Kristianto and Heru Susetyo, submitted a judicial review to the Constitutional Court to challenge the government decision. The researchers claimed that BRIN's existence "potentially raised uncertainties" in the Indonesia scientific community and requested clarification on "integration" in laws regulating sciences in Indonesia. The case was initially registered as Submission Deed No. 34/PUU/PAN.MK/AP3/08/2021 to the Constitutional Court. The deed was later registered as Case No. 46/PUU-XIX/2021 on 7 September 2021. The first review session was held on 21 September 2021. On 15 December 2021, the Constitutional Court decided to dismiss the case.

== Consolidation of research and development agencies within BRIN ==
In an attempt to consolidate state research activities under BRIN, the Indonesian government changed several ministries affected by the reform. Some ministries, which did not want to lose their R&D institutions to BRIN, due to R&D being vital for decision making were made to rescale their R&D operations, while also contributing part of their unit and resources to BRIN. Most ministries would no longer perform large-scale research, except for policy making purposes. The reform also changed BRIN so that it could perform such large scale research.

There were some exceptions. For example, the Ministry of Communication and Information Technology's Human Resources Research and Development Agency was allowed to much of its R&D due to the agency's specialized research in communication monitoring and policy making, research that is not innovative. Moreover the agency focuses largely on education and training. On 24 November 2021, the agency only relinquished 30 researchers, 2 research programs, and their funding to BRIN, to be combinied with preexisting BRIN research agencies.

BRIN's research scope is not without its limitations. In January 2022, BRIN decided to focus only on civilian research, for flexibility and ease in forming research collaborations. Defense and security research would not be within BRIN's scope due to the critical and secretive nature of such research. As a result, only the Defense Research and Development Agency of the Ministry of Defense was left out of the integration of ministerial research and development into BRIN, despite some of the researchers being transferred to BRIN. Also left out the integration were research and development agencies of the Indonesian National Armed Forces. This led into various units and researches formerly under LAPAN and BPPT, units that focused in military research and defense and security affairs, being kept out of BRIN and instead put under the Ministry of Defense. There was a plan to form a Defense Acquisition Institute (Lembaga Akuisisi Pertahanan), a military counterpart of BRIN, which was intended to oversee all military research and development agencies. On 2 March 2022, the Ministry of Defense and BRIN signed a memorandum of understanding (MoU) for research collaboration to bridge the gap between military and civilian researchers. On 17 June 2022, the Defense Research and Development Agency was replaced by the Agency for Defense Policy and Technology Development.

The Research and Development Center of the Indonesian National Police would also not be liquidated. On 11 January 2022, the National Police signed a research collaboration MoU with BRIN, as most of its research partnerships had already been liquidated.

=== Preceding agencies ===
This is a list of BRIN's predecessor agencies.

#	Preceding agency	Original parent organization	Original founding date	Date acquired by BRIN	Acquirement mode
1	Ministry of Research and Technology	N/A	16 March 1962	1 September 2021	Full integration
2	National Research and Innovation Agency (first incarnation)	N/A	24 October 2019	1 September 2021	Full integration
3	Indonesian Institute of Sciences	N/A	23 July 1967	1 September 2021	Full integration
4	Technology Assessment and Application Agency	N/A	21 August 1978	1 September 2021	Full integration
5	National Nuclear Energy Agency	N/A	5 December 1958	1 September 2021	Full integration
6	National Institute of Aeronautics and Space	N/A	27 November 1963	1 September 2021	Full integration
7	Eijkman Institute for Molecular Biology	Ministry of Research and Technology	31 July 1992	22 September 2021	Full integration
8	National Institute of Health Research and Development	Ministry of Health	12 December 1975	16 December 2021	
9	Agency for Marine and Fisheries Research and Human Resources	Ministry of Maritime Affairs and Fisheries	15 December 2000	16 December 2021	
10	Indonesian Agency for Agricultural Research and Development	Ministry of Agriculture	26 August 1974	21 September 2022	Partial integration
11	National Archaeology Research Institute	Ministry of Education, Culture, Research, and Technology	14 June 1913	16 December 2021	Full integration
12	Research, Development, and Innovation Agency	Ministry of Environment and Forestry	16 May 1913	TBA	Full integration
13	Environment and Forestry Instrumentation Standardization Agency	Ministry of Environment and Forestry	14 September 2020	TBA	Partial integration
14	Research, Development, Education, and Training Agency	Ministry of Religious Affairs	1 April 1975	16 December 2021	
15	Lajnah Pentahsihan Mushaf Al-Qur'an (Bureau for Checking Copies of the Quran)	Ministry of Religious Affairs	24 January 2007	16 December 2021	Full integration
16	Agency for Research and Development and Book Affairs	Ministry of Education and Culture	18 October 1969	16 December 2021	Partial integration
17	Agency for Law and Human Rights Research and Development	Ministry of Law and Human Rights	c. May 2001	16 December 2021	
18	Bureau for Supports for Human Rights Enforcement	National Commission on Human Rights	7 July 1993	TBA	
19	Archival System Research and Development Center	National Archives of Indonesia	28 January 1892	16 December 2021	
20	Center for Research, Product Promotion, and Cooperation	Geospatial Information Agency	17 October 1969	1 November 2022	
22	Center for Research and Human Resource Development	National Standardization Agency	26 March 1998	16 December 2021	
23	Center for Research and Development	National Population and Family Planning Board	29 June 1970	16 December 2021	
24	Center for Assessment of State Civil Servants Management	National Civil Service Agency		16 December 2021	
25	Center of Assessment of Radiation Facilities and Radioactives Monitoring System and Technology	Nuclear Energy Regulatory Agency	4 January 1999	16 December 2021	
26	Center of Assessment of Nuclear Installations and Nuclear Materials Monitoring System and Technology	Nuclear Energy Regulatory Agency	4 January 1999	16 December 2021	
27	Center for Development and Standardization of Agrarian Affairs and Spatial Planning Policies	Ministry of Agrarian Affairs and Spatial Planning/National Land Agency	26 August 1974	16 December 2021	
28	Research and Development Agency of the Ministry of Home Affairs	Ministry of Home Affairs	26 August 1974	16 December 2021	
29	Agency for Development and Information of Villages, Development of Disadvantaged Regions, and Transmigration	Ministry of Villages, Development of Disadvantaged Regions, and Transmigration	10 August 2020	16 December 2021	
30	Agency for Planning and Development	Ministry of Manpower	26 August 1974	16 December 2021	
31	Fiscal Policies Agency	Ministry of Finance	c. 1975	16 December 2021	
32	Human Resources Research and Development Agency	Ministry of Communication and Information Technology	26 August 1974	16 December 2021	Partial integration, human resource only
33	Assistant Deputy-ship of Cooperatives and Small & Medium Enterprises Research and Development	Ministry of Cooperatives and Small & Medium Enterprises	19 October 2015	16 December 2021	
34	Deputy of Strategic Policies	Ministry of Tourism and Creative Economy/Tourism and Creative Economy Agency	30 January 2020	16 December 2021	Partial integration, human resource only
35	Trade Policy Analysis and Development Agency	Ministry of Trade	29 April 2015	16 December 2021	
36	Transportation Research and Development Agency	Ministry of Transportation	22 April 1980	16 December 2021	
37	Defense Research and Development Agency	Ministry of Defense	24 August 1967	16 December 2021	Partial integration, human resource only
38	Agency for Social Education, Research, and Extension	Ministry of Social Affairs	26 August 1974	16 December 2021	
40	Agency for Research and Development, and Education and Training of Law and Justice	Supreme Court of Indonesia	25 October 1994	16 December 2021	
41	General Secretariat of People's Consultative Assembly	People's Consultative Assembly	27 May 1999	16 December 2021	Partial integration
42	General Secretariat of Regional Representative Council	Regional Representative Council	3 August 2005	16 December 2021	Partial integration
43	General Secretariat of People's Representative Council	People's Representative Council	12 May 1984	16 December 2021	Partial integration
44	Agency for Industrial Assessment and Development	Ministry of Industry	6 March 1984	TBA	
45	Energy and Mineral Resources Research and Development Agency	Ministry of Energy and Mineral Resources	c. 1850	TBA	
46	Geological Agency	Ministry of Energy and Mineral Resources	c. 1850	TBA	

== Organization ==
Presidential Decree No. 78/2021 overhauled and expanded the administrative structure of BRIN. The decree altered the BRIN Steering Committee and increased the Research Organizations of BRIN from the original 4 to 7, but less than the 11 originally planned. The Deputies structures was also altered to not be based on fields of expertise as before. On 6 September 2021, the full structure of BRIN was disclosed, citing Presidential Decree No. 78/2021 and Chairman of BRIN Decree No. 1/2021. It was revealed that those 7 Research Organizations were formed from more than a dozen former research organizations. On 24 September 2021, Chairman of BRIN Regulation No. 1/2021 was fully published. The regulation specified BRIN's executive officers and deputies.

The number of research organizations under BRIN is fluid and seems to always be changing; it was said they would amount to "dozens". Chairman of BRIN Regulation No. 4/2021 granted the Office of the Chairman of BRIN the power to form Research Organizations as the chairman deems necessary, with the approval of the Ministry of State Apparatus Utilization and Bureaucratic Reform. On 24 January 2022, it was announced that 12 approved research organizations, from a planned 18, would be finalized on 1 February 2022.

The full structure of BRIN is as follows:

1. Office of BRIN Steering Committee
  1. Office of Chairman of BRIN Steering Committee (ex-officio office filled with the BPIP Chairman of Steering Committee)
  2. Office of Vice Chairmen of BRIN Steering Committee (ex-officio office filled with the Minister of Finance and Ministry of National Development Planning)
  3. Secretary
  4. Steering Committees
  5. Executive Assistance Task Forces
2. Executives
  1. Office of Chairman of BRIN
  2. Office of Vice Chairman of BRIN
  3. Executive Secretariat
    1. Bureau of Planning and Finance
    2. Bureau of Law Affairs and Cooperation
    3. Bureau of Organization Affairs and Human Resources
    4. Bureau of State Properties Management Affairs and Procurement
    5. Bureau of Public Communication, General Affairs, and Secretariat
  4. Deputy I (Development Policy)
    1. Office of the Deputy I
    2. Deputy Secretary for Development Policy
    3. Directorate of Human Development, Population and Cultural Policy
    4. Directorate of Political, Legal, Defense, and Security Policy
    5. Directorate of Economy, Manpower, and Regional Development Policy
    6. Directorate of Environment, Maritime, Natural Resource, and Nuclear Power Policy
  5. Deputy II (Research and Innovation Policy)
    1. Office of the Deputy II
    2. Deputy Secretary for Research and Innovation Policy
    3. Directorate of Policy Formulation for Research, Technology, and Innovation
    4. Directorate of Measurements and Indicators for Research, Technology, and Innovation
    5. Directorate of Policy Evaluation of Research, Technology, and Innovation
  6. Deputy III (Human Resources of Science and Technology)
    1. Office of the Deputy III
    2. Deputy Secretary for Human Resources of Science and Technology
    3. Directorate of Competency Development
    4. Directorate of Functional Position Fostering and Professional Development
    5. Directorate of Talent Management
  7. Deputy IV (Research and Innovation Infrastructure)
    1. Office of the Deputy IV
    2. Deputy Secretary for Research and Innovation Infrastructure
    3. Directorate of Scientific Collection Management
    4. Directorate of Research Vessels Management
    5. Directorate of Laboratory Management, Research Facilities, and Science and Technology Park
    6. Directorate of Nuclear Facilities Management
    7. Directorate of Strengthening and Partnership of Research and Innovation Infrastructure
  8. Deputy V (Facilitation of Research and Innovation)
    1. Office of the Deputy V
    2. Deputy Secretary for Facilitation of Research and Innovation
    3. Directorate of Management of Research Permit and Innovation, and Scientific Authorities
    4. Directorate of Intellectual Property Management
    5. Directorate of Repositories, Multimedia and Scientific Publishing
    6. Directorate of Research and Innovation Funding
  9. Deputy VI (Utilization of Research and Innovation)
    1. Office of the Deputy VI
    2. Deputy Secretary of Utilization of Research and Innovation
    3. Directorate of Technology Transfer and Audit System
    4. Directorate of Utilization of Research and Innovation by Industries
    5. Directorate of Utilization of Research and Innovation by Government, Society, and Micro, Small, and Medium Enterprises
    6. Directorate of Research and Innovation Partnership
  10. Deputy VII (Regional Research and Innovation)
    1. Office of the Deputy VII
    2. Deputy Secretary of Regional Research and Innovation
    3. Directorate of Regional Research and Innovation Policy
    4. Directorate of Facilitation and Monitoring of Regional Research and Innovation
    5. Directorate of Dissemination and Utilization of Regional Research and Innovation
    6. Regional and Local BRIDA offices
  11. Executive Inspectorate
    1. Office of Main Inspectorate
    2. Division of General Affair and Reporting
    3. Inspectorate I (Internal Supervision of Main Secretariat, Research Organizations, and Centers)
    4. Inspectorate II (Internal Supervision of Deputy I, II, III, and VII)
    5. Inspectorate III (Internal Supervision of Deputy IV, V, and VI)
  12. Research Organizations (as disclosed on 24 January 2022)
    1. Research Organization for Earth Sciences and Maritime
    2. Research Organization for Life Sciences and Environment
    3. Research Organization for Agriculture and Food
    4. Research Organization for Health
    5. Research Organization for Archaeology, Language, and Literature
    6. Research Organization for Social Sciences and Humanities
    7. Research Organization for Nuclear Energy
    8. Research Organization for Governance, Economy, and Public Welfare
    9. Research Organization for Energy and Manufacture
    10. Research Organization for Nanotechnology and Material
    11. Research Organization for Electronics and Informatics
    12. Research Organization for Aeronautics and Space
  13. Centers
    1. Center of Data and Information (attached to Main Secretariat)
    2. Center of Technology Services (attached to Main Secretariat)
  14. Non-structural organizations (as disclosed 23 May 2022)
    1. Secretariat of Indonesian IAEA Technical Cooperation National Liaison Officers (TC-NLO)
    2. Indonesian Space Agency (INASA)
    3. Secretariat of Biodiversity Scientific Authority
    4. Secretariat of Indonesian UNESCO Intergovernmental Hydrological Program
    5. Secretariat of Indonesian UNESCO Management of Social Transformation Project
    6. Secretariat of Indonesian UNESCO Man and Biosphere Project
    7. Secretariat of Indonesian UNESCO Intergovernmental Oceanographic Commission
    8. BRIN Council of Professors
    9. Indonesian Nuclear Technology Polytechnic

== Reaction ==
BRIN's formation was welcomed by many scientists, and politicians, who praised its being a separate, independent agency that reports directly to the president.

However, there were fears that BRIN might become a political tool that would create a conflict of interest. BRIN's existence is closely tied to ex-president Megawati, and there was a rumor that Megawati wanted to be placed on BRIN's "Directorial Committee". The rumor become reality with the issuance of Presidential Decree No. 33/2021, which established the Steering Committee and making Megawati the ex-officio chairman.

To prevent BRIN from become a political tool, the Indonesian Young Scientists Academy (Indonesian: Akademi Ilmuwan Muda Indonesia (ALMI)) took three stances: (1) the government must base policy and decision making on what's good for science and technology; (2) preventing BRIN, science and technology institute and research centers, and universities from becoming state corporations, ensuring their neutrality and independence from the governing regime's political will and capitalist markets; and (3) ensuring BRIN's clear role as executor, not just as regulator, to prevent overlapping roles with ministries, and making clear BRIN's role as either independent agency of its own, or combining the existing government research and development agencies under the BRIN umbrella.

== Criticisms ==
=== Potential conflicts of interest ===
While it was desired by Indonesia's scientific community, the formation of BRIN was criticized due to its being coordinated with and sharing the same Steering Committee with BPIP. Critics are afraid that in doing so, BRIN becomes politicized and vulnerable to government intervention, which would threaten scientific freedom. This controversy arose largely because Megawati, a member of the BRIN steering committee, is also a political party leader. The opposition Prosperous Justice Party also lamented the decision, because the Steering Committee office was not mandated by Bill No. 11/2019 and thus did not have a legal basis. The Steering Committee's only basis was the Bill of Pancasila Ideology Direction, which supposedly became the legal basis for BPIP to grab power and which did not pass. The Prosperous Justice Party also criticized the combining of older state scientific institutes—such as LIPI, LAPAN, BPPT, and BATAN—because it not only would erase landmark Indonesia scientific institutions but also would clash with existing laws, primarily Law No. 10/1997 (Nuclear Power) and Law No. 21/2013 (Law of Space). The chairman, Laksana Tri Handoko, however, supported that the "Steering Committee – Executive" system, between BPIP and BRIN, is necessary for building "responsible science-based policy making" to guide national research programs that follow national interests and protect from irresponsible research that might be in conflict with national ideology and interests. The ruling Indonesian Democratic Party of Struggle supported the decision, largely due to Megawati's contribution to the Indonesian scientific community, and as the party claimed, one of the people advocating for greater scientific funding for Indonesian research agencies. Yanuar Nugroho, political scientist and research advisor of the Centre for Innovation Policy and Governance think-tank based in Jakarta, commented that if the steering committee exists for organizational purposes, it will not be a problem, as their job will be just steering the organization and its policies. However, if the steering committee exists to control the direction of the growth and advancement of research, it may become the problem as it will be seen as an attempt of the government, whoever is in power, to monopolize the sciences based on government' point of view. Because Indonesia will now have only BRIN, BRIN has to be "right and righteous" first before fully operating.

=== Liquidation strategy ===
The current status of BRIN, and its expansion by "eating" older existing research agencies, was also criticized. Azyumardi Azra, an Indonesian Islamic scholar, lamented the agency's merging strategy that was expected to take place over a very short period of time. Such process would be very, and even if it is succeeded, the resulting organization would become so massive. BRIN's merger strategy would undermine the National System of Sciences and Technology outlined by Law No. 11/2019, which law mandated the independence of each scientific organization and synergy between the scientific organizations. The fear is that if many scientific organizations are all combined under BRIN, then BRIN would monopolize state-sponsored research. Not only that, with the status of only research and development agency, not a group of ministries as before, the bargaining power of BRIN would be weak. These issues were resolved with the issuance of the new temporary BRIN constituting document, Presidential Decree No. 78/2021.

=== BRIDA formation ===
Not only the formation of BRIN, the formation of BRIDA offices across Indonesia was also difficult, largely because regional and local research and development agencies had been so long neglected, lacking resources, with their researches limited by regional and local policy making and lack of innovation.

=== Controversy over the liquidation of Balitbangtan ===
During the hearing by Commission IV of the People's Representative Council on 25 August 2021, Syahrul Yasin Limpo, the Minister of Agriculture, expressed his concern about BRIN's plan to subsume the Ministry of Agriculture's Indonesian Agency for Agricultural Research and Development (Badan Penelitian dan Pengembangan Pertanian (Balitbangtan)). While its performance is not as well known as that of other research agencies, the Agricultural Research and Development agency is relatively large, with established networks of state agriculture research institutes responsible for research activities on more than 707.4 million hectares of land, and possessing greater manpower than all other Indonesian institutes of science combined. Endang S. Thohari, former Ministry of Agriculture scientist, and one of the founders of Balitbangtan, who is currently a Great Indonesia Movement Party (Gerindra) politician sitting on Commission IV, also lamented the government's decision to liquidate the agency she founded with Indonesian agricultural scientists. In the hearing, Limpo asked for the support of Commission IV to spare Balitbangtan from liquidation, or, if liquidated, that only basic research divisions be relinquished to BRIN, while specialized agricultural researches would still be done by Balitbangtan.

Earlier, on 20 August 2021, the Research Professor Communication Forum of Balitbangtan also voiced the same concern. Tahlim Sudaryanto, agriculture professor and the head of the Research Professor Communication Forum submitted a forum report to the Ministry of State Apparatus Utilization and Bureaucratic Reform and the Ministry of State Secretariat. The forum report concluded that it is very hard to combine an agency as large as Balitbangtan with BRIN without disruption. The forum report offered two options: (1) soft integration, and (2) partial integration. If soft integration were chosen, BRIN would lack the power to control Balitbangtan, which would still be attached to the Ministry of Agriculture, although Balitbangtan programs and funding would be supervised by BRIN. While the option would not be as advantageous to BRIN, the option does strengthen BRIN and Balitbangtan in collaboration in the National Plan of National Research Priorities of 2020 – 2024 period. If partial integration were chosen, part of Balitbangtan would be relinquished to BRIN, and what remained with Balitbangtan would become a non-research institution under the Ministry of Agriculture with tasks assigned in the future. While this option is more advantageous for BRIN, the execution of the option must be not be rushed before the 31 December 2022 deadline, as mandated by Circular No. B/295/M.SM.02.03/2021. The report urged the government to change their deadline if the second option is chosen.

On 21 September 2021, the Ministry of Agriculture made plans to disband Balitbangtan, despite previous ministry reluctance to do so, and relinquish all of it units to BRIN. As a replacement for Balitbangtan, the ministry set up an agency tentatively called the "Agricultural Standardization and System Agency" (Indonesian: Badan Standardisasi dan Sistem Pertanian (BSSP)), a regulatory and standardization agency. Along with the disbandment of Balitbangtan, part of the ministry's Food Security Agency was also relinquished to BRIN, while another part was expected to become an embryonic agency, the National Food Agency. On 21 September 2022, Balitbangtan was formally dissolved.

=== Attacks from the Prosperous Justice Party ===
BRIN's existence was not welcomed by Indonesian Islamist groups. The Islamist groups, led by the current Islamist parliamentary opposition party, Prosperous Justice Party (PKS), continuously attacked BRIN's existence, largely because of their dislike of Megawati and the Indonesian Democratic Party of Struggle (PDI-P). The PKS had made numerous attacks, called "criticisms", against the new institution since the beginning of the separation of BRIN from the Ministry of Research and technology. The Islamist party also used an Islamic-themed populist narrative in an attempt to delegitimize BRIN's existence and claimed that BRIN's existence was part of a "de-Habibie-nization project", accusing the Widodo administration of attempts to "remove landmarks left by Habibie and other Islamic scholars and scientists in building Indonesia research ecosystem" and favoring a "secular model of scientific development" rather than a religious one. In Indonesian political history, Habibie was an Islamic scholar and the first president during the Reformasi era. During his era Islamic puritanism and Islamic conservatism was given the "living breath" and opportunities, and Habibie had a good relationship with Indonesian Islamists and right-wing activists. For his role, Habibie was made the PKS party's patron in 2016; for the PKS Habibie is a "scholar and democrat".,

=== Friction with Commission VII DPR ===
BRIN has been criticized for apparent inefficiency. Laksana Tri Handoko was involved in controversy with Commission VII DPR, which resulted in the Commission recommending his expulsion from BRIN, to be replaced by a more competent person and that BRIN be audited by the Audit Board of Indonesia (BPK). One Commission VII DPR member, Syaikhul Islam Ali from the National Awakening Party, even asked that Laksana replacement not necessarily be a researcher, but a manager with the capability to be a chairman of BRIN. However, the DPR itself did not have power to do this. Despite that, Megawati ordered Handoko to remain and supported his leadership. The BPK finished their audit on 31 January 2023, but the BPK report is yet to be published.

=== Centralization of Human Resources ===
In end of 2024, there is BRIN policy to centralize their researchers and engineers to their central office and main 9 national science and technology centers, which eventually implemented on 2 January 2025. This policy resulted in wasting researchers' and engineers' personal time and financial resources as most of them are from BRIN branches and labs that scattered across Indonesia outside of Java Island and abandonment of numerous BRIN facilities. Those abandoned BRIN facilities, however, rather being keep by BRIN for future uses, BRIN chose to relinquish some of these office and facilities to Prabowo's new ministries, particularly Ministry of Primary and Secondary Education, Ministry of Culture, and Ministry of Immigration and Correction. Researchers productivity also being hampered, because at the central locations designated by BRIN does not have enough facilities, equipment, and infrastructures to accommodate all moved-in researchers.

The policy becomes unpopular. Eventually, when Arif Satria become the Chairman of BRIN, the policy reversed in partial in December 2025 and in January 2026 the policy becomes reviewed to be repealed completely. Even with repeals, because the facilities already relinquished to other ministries, BRIN likely going ended in difficult situation due to some of their regional office already relinquished and researchers that chose to be returned to original office will do not have working office.

== List of BRIN core leadership ==
=== List of Chairmen ===
#	Image	Chairman	Took office	Left office	Years in office	Cabinet
1		Bambang Brodjonegoro	23 October 2019	28 April 2021	1 year, 187 days	Onward Indonesia Cabinet
2		Laksana Tri Handoko	28 April 2021	10 November 2025	4 years, 196 days	Onward Indonesia Cabinet
2		Laksana Tri Handoko	28 April 2021	10 November 2025	4 years, 196 days	Red and White Cabinet
3		Arif Satria	10 November 2025	Incumbent	293 days	Red and White Cabinet

=== List of Deputy Chairmen ===
#	Image	Deputy Chairman	Took office	Left office	Years in office	Cabinet
1		Amarulla Octavian	3 August 2023	Incumbent	3 years, 27 days	Onward Indonesia Cabinet
1		Amarulla Octavian	3 August 2023	Incumbent	3 years, 27 days	Red and White Cabinet
