= Ministry of Religious Affairs (Indonesia) =

Government ministry of Indonesia

- Kementerian Agama
- Insignia of the Ministry of Religious Affairs

- Flag of the Ministry of Religious Affairs

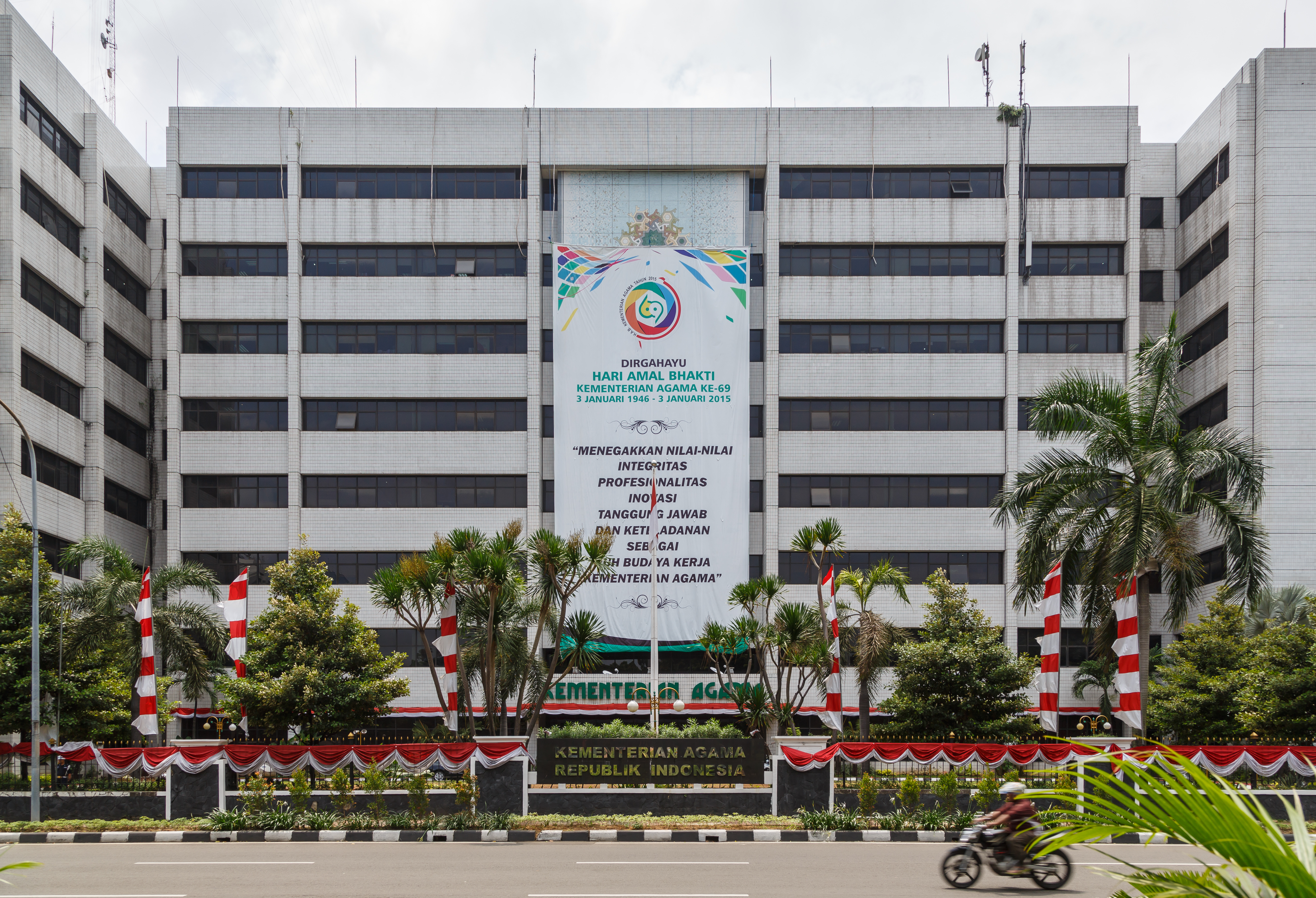
- One of the Ministry of Religious Affairs headquarters building in Jakarta

Agency overview
- Formed: 3 January 1946; 80 years ago
- Jurisdiction: Government of Indonesia
- Headquarters: Jalan Lapangan Banteng Barat no. 3–4 Central Jakarta Jakarta, Indonesia
- Motto: Ikhlas Beramal (Doing deeds sincerely)
- Ministers responsible: Nasaruddin Umar, Minister of Religious Affairs; Muhammad Syafi'i, Vice Minister of Religious Affairs
- Website: www.kemenag.go.id

The Ministry of Religious Affairs (Indonesian: Kementerian Agama) is an Indonesian ministry that administers religious affairs. It is responsible to the president, and is led by a minister.

== History ==
Plans for the creation of a Ministry of Religious Affairs was proposed for first time in the meeting of the Committee for Preparatory Work for Indonesian Independence by Mohammad Yamin on 11 July 1945. He proposed to create special religion-related ministry, Ministry of Islamic Affairs, which ensures Indonesian Muslim affairs. However, this proposal didn't gather much of a reception.

The creation of the Ministry of Religious Affairs was proposed for the second time in a session of the Preparatory Committee for Indonesian Independence on 19 August 1945. The proposal was accepted by six from 27 members. Johannes Latuharhary, who rejected the proposal, proposed to handle religion affairs in Ministry of Education. Abdul Abbas supported Johannes' proposal. Iwa Kusumasumatri agreed that religious affairs should be handled by the ministry, however rejected the creation of special-religion ministry because of national scope of government. Ki Hadjar Dewantara proposed that religious affairs should be handled by Ministry of Home Affairs. The session rejected the creation of Ministry of Religious Affairs. Thus, Ministry of Religious Affairs had not been created until First Sjahrir Cabinet.

The creation of the Ministry of the Religious Affairs was re-proposed for the third time to the Working Committee of the Central Indonesian National Committee on 11 November 1945 by K.H. Abudardiri, K.H. Saleh Suaidy, and M. Sukoso Wirjosaputro. This proposal was also supported by Mohammad Natsir, Muwardi, Marzuki Mahdi, and Kartosudarmo. The proposal was accepted during the sessions of the Committee on 25–28 November 1945. Thus, the Ministry of Religious Affairs was created on 3 January 1946, with Haji Mohammad Rasjidi appointed the first Minister of Religious Affairs. Haji Mohammad Rasjidi was the State Minister of the Cabinet at the time that handled Islamic affairs. The Ministry of Religious Affairs took over marriage, religious court, mosque and hajj affairs from Ministry of Home Affairs, Islamic High Court from Ministry of Justice and religious education from Ministry of Education, Pedagogy and Culture. The 1946 legislation also provided for the protection of Indonesia's Catholics and Protestants under the ministry's framework.

Some people hold view that Ministry of Religious Affairs is not a new creation. The lineage of the Ministry of Religious Affairs can be traced back to the Japanese colonial period (宗務部, Shūmubu, lit. 'Religious Affairs Office') or the Dutch colonial period (Het Kantoor voor Inlandsche Zaken, lit. 'The Office for Indigenous Affairs'). Sometimes, people traced it back to the Islamic kingdoms period.

Beginning in the 1960s, the MRA expanded its scope to include Hindus, Buddhists, and Confucian Chinese Indonesians.

Responsibility for the Hajj and Umrah affairs of Muslims was removed from the ministry's control in 2025.

Pesantren affairs would be eventually raised into a directorate general level in 2026. The directorate general raised from the Directorate for Islamic Traditional Education and Pesantrens, Directorate General of Islamic Education.

== Portfolio and function ==
Under the Constitution and state legislations, in the performance of its mission, the Ministry is entitled to:

1. formulate, stipulate, and implement state policies for the religious communities of Indonesia.
2. manage and administer state properties under the Ministry's ownership.
3. supervise in the implementation of duties assigned to the Ministry.
4. implement technical guidance and supervision of the implementation of affairs of Ministerial branch offices in the country's administrative divisions.
5. implement any technical activities at all levels of society and within the administrative divisions of the nation or nationwide.
6. formation and implementation of a national Halal policy on culinary products.

== Organization ==
According to Presidential Decree No. 18/2026 and Ministry of Religious Affairs Decree No. 4/2026 and 16/2026, the Ministry of Religious Affairs is organized into several units

- Office of the Minister of Religious Affairs
- Office of the Deputy Minister of Religious Affairs
- Secretariat General
  - Bureau of Planning
  - Bureau of Human Resources
  - Bureau of Finance and State Properties
  - Bureau of Organization and Administration
  - Bureau of Law and International Cooperation
  - Bureau of General Affairs
  - Bureau of Public Relations and Public Communication
- Inspectorate General
  - Inspectorate General Secretariat
  - Inspectorate I
  - Inspectorate II
  - Inspectorate III
  - Inspectorate IV
  - Inspectorate V
- Directorate Generals
  - Directorate General of Islamic Education (Direktorat Jenderal Pendidikan Islam)
    - Directorate General of Islamic Education Secretariat
    - Directorate for Madrasa Curricular and Student Affairs
      - Sub-directorate of Madrasa Curriculum and Assessments
      - Sub-directorate of Madrasa Student Affairs and Talents
      - Sub-directorate of Curricular and Student Affairs for Vocational, Inclusion, and Special Services Institutions
    - Directorate for Madrasa Teachers and Education Personnel
      - Sub-directorate of Distribution and Mutation Affairs
      - Sub-directorate of Career Fostering and Guidance
      - Sub-directorate of Competency Upgrading, Qualifications, and Professional Affairs
      - Sub-directorate of Welfare and Protection
      - Sub-directorate of Teachers and Education Personnel in Vocational, Inclusion, and Special Services Institutions
    - Directorate for Madrasa Institutional Affairs and Infrastructures
      - Sub-directorate of Madrasa Institutional Affairs
      - Sub-directorate of Madrasa Equipment and Infrastructures
      - Sub-directorate of Institutional Affairs and Infrastructures for Vocational, Inclusion, and Special Services Institutions
      - Sub-directorate of Evaluation and Partnership
    - Directorate for Islamic Higher Education
      - Sub-directorate of Academic Affairs
      - Sub-directorate of Personnel Affairs
      - Sub-directorate of Equipment, Infrastructures, and Student Affairs
      - Sub-directorate of Institutional Affairs and Partnership
      - Sub-directorate of Research and Community Services
    - Directorate for Islamic Education
      - Sub-directorate of Islamic Education for Preschool and Kindergarten Level
      - Sub-directorate of Islamic Education for Elementary and Special Elementary Level
      - Sub-directorate of Islamic Education for Junior High and Special Junior High Level
      - Sub-directorate of Islamic Education for Senior High, Special Senior High, and Vocation High Level
      - Sub-directorate of Islamic Education for General University Level
    - State Islamic Universities and Colleges in Indonesia
  - Directorate General for Pesantrens
    - Directorate General for Pesantrens Secretariat
    - Directorate for Muadalah (Pesantren-run Islamic Religious Primary and Secondary Schools) Education and Formal Diniyya (Pesantren-run Islamic Religious Schools) Education
      - Sub-directorate of Curriculum Affairs, Evaluation, and Quality Assurance
      - Sub-directorate of Institution and Santri Affairs
      - Sub-directorate of Pesantren Personnel
      - Sub-directorate of Pesantren Equipment and Infrastructures
    - Directorate for Ma'had Aly (Pesantren-run Deemed Universities)
      - Sub-directorate of Ma'had Aly Academic Affairs
      - Sub-directorate of Ma'had Aly Curriculum and Institution Affairs
      - Sub-directorate of Ma'had Aly Personnel, Equipment, and Infrastructures
      - Sub-directorate of Ma'had Aly Evaluation and Quality Assurance
    - Directorate for Diniyya Takmilliyya (Islamic Religious Evening Schools) Education and Non-formal Education
      - Sub-directorate of Pesantren Da'wa (Proselytizing)
      - Sub-directorate of Diniyya Takmilliyya
      - Sub-directorate of Qur'anic Education
      - Sub-directorate of Islamic Classical Education
    - Directorate for Pesantren Empowerment
      - Fostering Sub-directorate of Pesantren Sharia Economy
      - Fostering Sub-directorate of Pesantren Business Planning and Development
  - Directorate General of Islamic Community Guidance (Direktorat Jenderal Bimbingan Masyarakat Islam)
    - Directorate General of Islamic Community Guidance Secretariat
    - Directorate for Islamic Affairs and Sharia Guidance
      - Sub-directorate of Hisab, Rukyat, and Sharia Affairs
      - Sub-directorate of Mosque Affairs
      - Sub-directorate of Islamic Understandings Development and Conflict Resolutions
      - Sub-directorate of Islamic Literary
    - Directorate for Religious Affair Offices Fostering and Sakina Family
      - Sub-directorate of Marriage Registrar Professional Fostering
      - Sub-directorate of Religious Affair Offices Institutional Development and Quality Assurance
      - Sub-directorate of Equipment and Infrastructures of Religious Affair Offices
      - Sub-directorate of Sakina Family Development
    - Directorate for Islamic Information
      - Sub-directorate of Religious Extension Professional Fostering
      - Sub-directorate of Da'wah and Islamic Festivities
      - Sub-directorate of Quranic Tilawah and Musabaqah Institutions
      - Sub-directorate of Partnerships
      - Sub-directorate of Islamic Religious Arts, Culture, Broadcastings
    - Directorate for Zakat and Waqf
      - Sub-directorate of Institutional Licensing and Evaluation of Zakat and Waqf Institutions
      - Sub-directorate of Institutional Development of Zakat and Waqf Institutions
      - Sub-directorate of Zakat Institutional Monitoring
      - Sub-directorate of Waqf Institutional Monitoring
    - Directorate for Halal Products Assurance
  - Directorate General of Christian Community Guidance (Direktorat Jenderal Bimbingan Masyarakat Kristen)
    - Directorate General of Christian Community Guidance Secretariat
    - Directorate for Christian Affairs
      - Sub-directorate of Instiutional Affairs
      - Sub-directorate of Religious Extension
      - Sub-directorate of Community Empowerment and Cultural Development
    - Directorate for Christian Education
      - Sub-directorate of Primary Education
      - Sub-directorate of Secondary Education
      - Sub-directorate of Religious Higher Education
    - Ambon State Christian Institute, Ambon
    - Kupang State Christian Institute, Kupang
    - Manado State Christian Institute, Manado
    - Palangka Raya State Christian Institute, Palangka Raya
    - Tarutung Christian Institute, Tarutung
    - Toraja State Christian Institute, Tana Toraja
    - Sentani Protestan State Christian College, Jayapura
  - Directorate General of Catholic Community Guidance (Direktorat Jenderal Bimbingan Masyarakat Katolik)
    - Directorate General of Catholic Community Guidance Secretariat
    - Directorate for Catholic Affairs
      - Sub-directorate of Instiutional Affairs
      - Sub-directorate of Religious Extension
      - Sub-directorate of Community Empowerment
    - Directorate for Catholic Education
      - Sub-directorate of Primary Education
      - Sub-directorate of Secondary Education
      - Sub-directorate of Religious Higher Education
    - Kubu Raya State Catholic College, Kubu Raya
  - Directorate General of Hindu Community Guidance (Direktorat Jenderal Bimbingan Masyarakat Hindu)
    - Directorate General of Hindu Community Guidance Secretariat
    - Directorate for Hindu Affairs
      - Sub-directorate of Instiutional Affairs
      - Sub-directorate of Religious Extension
      - Sub-directorate of Community Empowerment
    - Directorate for Hindu Education
      - Sub-directorate of Primary Education
      - Sub-directorate of Secondary Education
      - Sub-directorate of Religious Higher Education
    - I Gusti Bagus Sugriwa State Hindu University, Denpasar
    - Gde Pudja State Hindu Institute, Mataram
    - Tampung Penyang State Hindu Institute, Palangka Raya
    - Jawa Dwipa State Hindu College, Klaten
    - Mpu Kuturan State Hindu College, Singaraja
  - Directorate General of Buddhist Community Guidance (Direktorat Jenderal Bimbingan Masyarakat Buddha)
    - Directorate General of Buddhist Community Guidance Secretariat
    - Directorate for Buddhist Affairs
      - Sub-directorate of Instiutional Affairs
      - Sub-directorate of Religious Extension
      - Sub-directorate of Community Empowerment
    - Directorate for Buddhist Education
      - Sub-directorate of Primary and Secondary Education
      - Sub-directorate of Religious Higher Education
    - Sriwijaya State College of Buddhism, Banten
    - Raden Wijaya State College of Buddhism, Wonogiri
- Agencies
  - Agency of Religious Moderation and Human Resource Development
    - Agency of Religious Moderation and Human Resource Development Secretariat
    - Strategic Policies Development Center for Development Policies in Religious Affairs
    - Strategic Policies Development Center for Religious Education and Religious Studies
    - Competency Development Center for Management, Leadership, and Religious Moderation
    - Competency Development Center for Education Personnel and Religious Human Resources Competencies
    - Bureau for Checking Copies of the Qur'an
      - Bayt Al-Qur'an and Museum Istiqlal (BQMI), Taman Mini Indonesia Indah, East Jakarta
    - Aceh Religious Education and Training Center
    - Medan Religious Education and Training Center
    - Padang Religious Education and Training Center
    - Palembang Religious Education and Training Center
    - Jakarta Religious Education and Training Center
    - Bandung Religious Education and Training Center
    - Semarang Religious Education and Training Center
    - Surabaya Religious Education and Training Center
    - Banjarmasin Religious Education and Training Center
    - Manado Religious Education and Training Center
    - Denpasar Religious Education and Training Center
    - Makassar Religious Education and Training Center
    - Ambon Religious Education and Training Center
    - Papua Religious Education and Training Center
    - Jakarta Religious Research and Development Center
    - Makassar Religious Research and Development Center
    - Semarang Religious Research and Development Center
- Centers
  - Center for Data, Technology, and Information
  - Center for Inter-religious Harmony
  - Center for Confucianism Guidance and Education
    - State College of Confucianism "SETIAKIN", Pangkal Pinang
  - Center for Religious Education and Religious Studies
  - Appraisal Center for Religious Books, Lectures, and Religious Literatures
- Provincial Representative Offices
  - Ministry of Religious Affairs Regional Office of Aceh
  - Ministry of Religious Affairs Regional Office of North Sumatera
  - Ministry of Religious Affairs Regional Office of West Sumatera
  - Ministry of Religious Affairs Regional Office of Riau
  - Ministry of Religious Affairs Regional Office of Riau Islands
  - Ministry of Religious Affairs Regional Office of Jambi
  - Ministry of Religious Affairs Regional Office of South Sumatera
  - Ministry of Religious Affairs Regional Office of Bangka Belitung
  - Ministry of Religious Affairs Regional Office of Bengkulu
  - Ministry of Religious Affairs Regional Office of Lampung
  - Ministry of Religious Affairs Regional Office of Banten
  - Ministry of Religious Affairs Regional Office of Jakarta
  - Ministry of Religious Affairs Regional Office of West Java
  - Ministry of Religious Affairs Regional Office of Central Java
  - Ministry of Religious Affairs Regional Office of Yogyakarta
  - Ministry of Religious Affairs Regional Office of East Java
  - Ministry of Religious Affairs Regional Office of Bali
  - Ministry of Religious Affairs Regional Office of West Nusa Tenggara
  - Ministry of Religious Affairs Regional Office of East Nusa Tenggara
  - Ministry of Religious Affairs Regional Office of West Kalimantan
  - Ministry of Religious Affairs Regional Office of South Kalimantan
  - Ministry of Religious Affairs Regional Office of East Kalimantan
  - Ministry of Religious Affairs Regional Office of North Kalimantan
  - Ministry of Religious Affairs Regional Office of North Sulawesi
  - Ministry of Religious Affairs Regional Office of Central Sulawesi
  - Ministry of Religious Affairs Regional Office of South Sulawesi
  - Ministry of Religious Affairs Regional Office of Southeast Sulawesi
  - Ministry of Religious Affairs Regional Office of Gorontalo
  - Ministry of Religious Affairs Regional Office of West Sulawesi
  - Ministry of Religious Affairs Regional Office of Maluku
  - Ministry of Religious Affairs Regional Office of North Maluku
  - Ministry of Religious Affairs Regional Office of Papua
  - Ministry of Religious Affairs Regional Office of West Papua
  - Ministry of Religious Affairs Regional Office of Central Papua
  - Ministry of Religious Affairs Regional Office of Southwest Papua
- Expert Staff
  - Expert Staff of Religious Bodies Relation
  - Expert Staff of Information and Communication Management
  - Expert Staff of Law and Human Rights
