= Indonesian Institute of Sciences =

Former Indonesian science and research organization

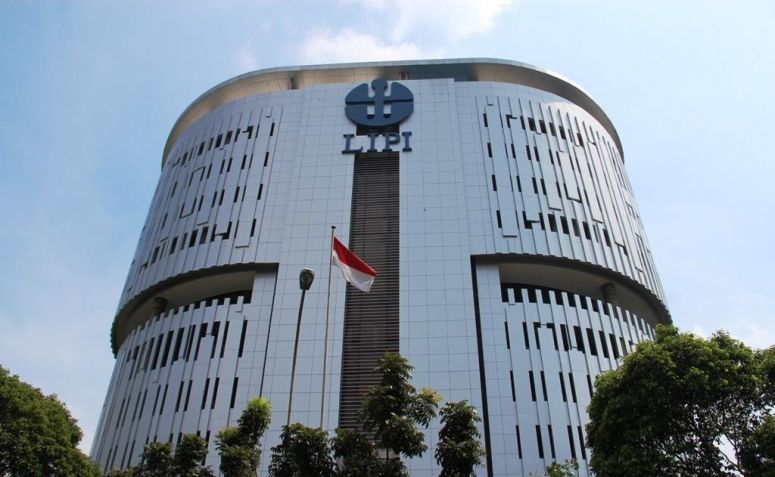
- Indonesian Institute of Sciences headquarters
- Established: 1956 (as MIPI); 23 December 1967 (as LIPI)
- President: Agus Haryono (last)
- Address: Jl. Jend. Gatot Subroto 10, Jakarta 12710
- Location: Indonesia
- Website: www.lipi.go.id
- Dissolved: September 1, 2021

The Indonesian Institute of Sciences (Indonesian: Lembaga Ilmu Pengetahuan Indonesia, or LIPI) was the governmental authority for science and research in Indonesia. It consisted of 47 research centers in the fields ranging from social to natural sciences.

With the enactment of Presidential Decree No. 33/2021 on 5 May 2021, LIPI was disbanded along with government research agencies such as Agency of Assessment and Application of Technology (Indonesian: Badan Pengkajian dan Penerapan Teknologi, BPPT), National Nuclear Energy Agency (Indonesian: Badan Tenaga Nuklir Nasional, BATAN), and National Institute of Aeronautics and Space (Indonesian: Lembaga Penerbangan dan Antariksa Nasional, LAPAN). All of those agencies fused into the newly formed National Research and Innovation Agency (Indonesian: Badan Riset dan Inovasi Nasional, BRIN).

The disbandment process was expected to be finished on 1 January 2022. On 1 September 2021, LIPI finally dissolved as independent agency and was transformed into four Technical Implementing Organizations of BRIN: Engineering Science Research Organization, Earth Sciences Research Organization, Life Sciences Research Organization, and Social and Humanities Research Organization), indicating the beginning of the institutional integration of the former LIPI into BRIN.

== History ==
With growing interest in scientific research, the government of the Dutch East Indies established Natuurwetenschappelijke Raad voor Nederlandsch-Indië (Scientific Council of the Dutch East Indies) in 1928. It operated as the country's main research organization until the Japanese occupation in 1942. The Dutch returned to Indonesia and resumed control of the council, the institute was renamed Organisatie voor Natuurwetenschappelijk Onderzoek (OPIPA, Organisation for Scientific Research) in 1948.

In 1956 the organization was nationalized as Majelis Ilmu Pengetahuan Indonesia (MIPI, Indonesian Sciences Council). Then in 1962 the government established the Departemen Urusan Riset Nasional (DURENAS, National Research Affairs Department), while MIPI are in charge of founding and operates various National Research Institutes. And in 1966 the government changed the status of DURENAS into Lembaga Riset Nasional (LEMRENAS) (National Research Institute).

In August 1967 the government dissolved LEMRENAS and MIPI with presidential decree no. 128/1967 and established the Indonesian Institute of Sciences. The new institute ran the operation that was previously covered by LEMRENAS and MIPI.

== Research areas ==
LIPI had several research centers:

- Science and technology development
- Geotechnology
- Oceanography
- Limnology
- Metallurgy
- Biology
- Biotechnology
- Biomaterial
- Physics
- Chemistry
- Informatics
- Electrical engineering and mechatronics
- Electronics and telecommunication
- Social and cultural sciences
- Economy
- Population studies
- Politics
- Regional resources
- Calibration, Instrumentation and Metrology
- Quality control and testing

== Public services ==
LIPI was responsible for several public services related to science, technology and research activities across Indonesia.

- ARSIP (Scientific Data Mirroring Service)
- Indonesia NTP (Network Time Protocol)
- Public Cluster (open and free facility to perform distributed computing)
- ISSN Online
- FRP (Foreign Researcher Permit Online)
- ISI (Indonesian Scientific Index)
- Indonesia OSS (Indonesia Open Source Software)
- Info H@KI (information on Intellectual Property Rights)
- Jurnal Online (online journal management system)
- KOKI (Online Calculator for Scientific and Financial Performance)
- Indonesia MoW (Indonesia Memory of the World)
- OPI (online professional organization and conference management system)
- LIPI-IR (LIPI Institutional Repository)
- SciBlog (online scientific web-log for scientific collaboration)
- TESIS Online (archive and repository of theses works in Indonesia)
- Uji Kalibrasi (calibration service)
- LUP (Lab Uji Polimer)
- LEWS (Landslide Early Warning System)

== Affiliation ==
LIPI directly or indirectly authorized several scientific organizations in Indonesian, as:

- CODATA Indonesia
- COREMAP

== Botanical Gardens ==
LIPI managed four botanical gardens in Indonesia, which were all developed during the Dutch colonial period:

- Bogor Botanical Garden, West Java
- Cibodas Botanical Garden, West Java
- Purwodadi Botanical Garden, East Java
- Bali Botanic Garden, Bali

== Electric car ==
LIPI made an electric car named Marlik (abbreviation of Marmut listrik, "electrical marmot") with the specifications: 40 km/h plain, 20 km/h steep, 300 kilometers run or 8 hours active with price Rp.40 million ($4,444)/unit for city car and smart car.

== English economic journal ==
June 2011: To improve LIPI's status around the world, as well as giving Indonesian researchers more exposure internationally, (at the time the rank was 220th in the world), LIPI launched a biannual English-language journal, Review of Indonesian Economic and Business Studies (RIEBS).

== Joint projects ==
Together with Japan's National Institute of Technology and Evaluation, LIPI significantly increased Indonesia's microbial collection record from 200 to 6,500 between 2003 and 2009 and more than 1,800 microbes are believed to be new discoveries.

The Royal Netherlands Institute of Southeast Asian and Caribbean Studies had an office ("KITLV-Jakarta", set up in 1969) in Jakarta that collaborates with LIPI.

== End of LIPI ==
On 1 September 2021, LIPI finally dissolved and transformed into 4 Technical Implementation Organizations of BRIN, facilitating the transition from LIPI to BRIN.
