= Laksana Tri Handoko =

Indonesian physicist

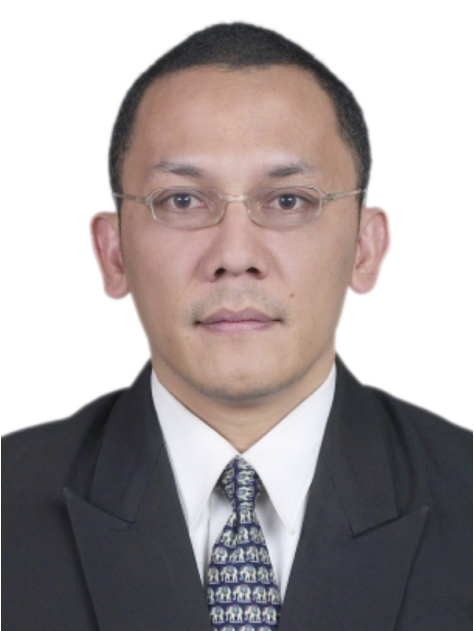

2nd Chairman of National Research and Innovation Agency
- In office 28 April 2021 – 10 November 2025
- President: Joko Widodo; Prabowo Subianto
- Preceded by: Bambang Brodjonegoro (as Head of BRIN); Agus Haryono (as Head of Indonesian Institute of Sciences); Hammam Riza (as Head of Agency for the Assessment and Application of Technology); Anhar Riza Antariksawan (as Head of National Nuclear Energy Agency of Indonesia); Thomas Djamaluddin (as Head of National Institute of Aeronautics and Space)
- Succeeded by: Arif Satria

10th Chairman of Indonesian Institute of Sciences
- In office 31 May 2018 – 28 April 2021
- President: Joko Widodo
- Preceded by: Iskandar Zulkarnaen
- Succeeded by: Agus Haryono

Personal details
- Born: Laksana Tri Handoko; 7 May 1968 (age 58) Lawang, Malang Regency, East Java, Indonesia
- Spouse: Laila Andaryani
- Education: Kumamoto University (B.Sc); Hiroshima University (M.Sc, Dr.)

Laksana Tri Handoko (born 7 May 1968, in Malang) is an Indonesian scientist and public official specializing in theoretical and particle physics. He formerly served as the deputy head of science and technology for the Indonesian Institute of Sciences (Indonesian: Lembaga Ilmu Pengetahuan Indonesia, LIPI) from 2014 to 2018. In 2018, he replaced Bambang Subiyanto as the acting chairman of the institute.

He was Chairman of the National Research and Innovation Agency (Indonesian: Badan Riset dan Inovasi Nasional, BRIN) from 2021 to 2025.

== Early life and education ==
Handoko born to Suyono and Susasi. His father was a physics lecturer at Gadjah Mada University and a part-time chicken farmer together with his mother. At that period, the physics lecturer did not earn adequate paychecks due to limited opportunities and salaries in Indonesia at that time, resulting in his father having a side job as a chicken farmer. Through chicken farming, his parents educated him on professionalism and hard work early in his youth.

Despite his background, Handoko's love of physics and his love for physics bring him to the Bandung Institute of Technology for undergraduate study in physics. However, when Habibie opened the Overseas Fellowship Program scholarship, he became an awardee and resigned from Bandung Institute of Technology. He completed his undergraduate study at Kumamoto University, and then his graduate study in particle physics at Hiroshima University.

Between his time of undergraduate graduation and master's study, he worked at a Japanese wood factory and later became a gas station employee in Japan.

He became a fellow of the Alexander von Humboldt Foundation in 1999, and he's also the secretary of the Humboldt Alumni Association of Indonesia.

== Careers ==
=== LIPI Scientist ===
After returning to Indonesia, Handoko joined LIPI. In LIPI, he joined the Theoretical Physics group. In 2002, he later became Head of the LIPI Theoretical Physics Group, a post he held for 10 years. In 2012, he became Head of the LIPI Research Center for Informatics. He rose to the rank of Deputy III (Engineering Sciences) of LIPI from 2014 until 2018.

=== Educator ===
During this time as a LIPI scientist, he was appointed as a visiting professor at the Department of Physics Bogor Agricultural Institute (2002–2004) and the Department of Physics University of Indonesia (since 2002). At the time of his appointment as Chairman of BRIN, he still holds the visiting professor position at the University of Indonesia.

=== Chairman of LIPI ===
He became the 10th Chairman of LIPI in 2018, succeeding Iskandar Zulkarnaen, the 9th Chairman of LIPI. Previously, the post was filled in an acting capacity by Bambang Subiyanto in the transition period between Zulkarnaen to Handoko. He was the penultimate chairman of LIPI.

=== Chairman of BRIN ===
On the second reshuffle of the Onward Indonesia cabinet that was announced on 28 April 2021, he was appointed as the second (but first independent) holder of Chairman of BRIN. After liquidation of Indonesian Institute of Sciences (Indonesian: Lembaga Ilmu Pengetahuan Indonesia, LIPI), Agency for the Assessment and Application of Technology (Indonesian: Badan Pengkajian dan Penerapan Teknologi, BPPT), National Nuclear Energy Agency of Indonesia (Indonesian: Badan Tenaga Nuklir Nasional, BATAN), and National Institute of Aeronautics and Space (Indonesian: Lembaga Penerbangan dan Antariksa Nasional, LAPAN) into BRIN on 1 September 2021, he currently become the Head of BRIN in its first consolidated form.

=== Post-Chairmanship ===
After no longer become the Chairman of BRIN, Laksana was appointed as BRIN Research Professor with rank Principal Investigator Researcher thru Presidential Decision No. 36/M/2025 and stationed in Research Center for Quantum Physics, Research Organization of Nanotechnology and Material (ORNAMAT).

== Honors and awards ==
=== Scholarships and Fellowships ===
- Overseas Fellowship Program Scholarship, Batch IV, Ministry of Research and Technology (1987–1993)
- Science and Technology for Industrial Development Scholarship, Batch II, Ministry of Research and Technology (1993–1995)
- Monbusho Scholarship, Ministry of Education, Culture, Sports, Science and Technology (1995–1998)
- Postdoctoral Fellowship of the Alexander von Humboldt Stiftung (1998–2001)
- Postdoctoral Fellowship of the Deutsch Electronen Synchroton Stiftung (2000–2001)
- Postdoctoral Fellowship of the ASEAN-KOSEF project at Yonsei University (2003)
- Simons Regular Associate of International Centre for Theoretical Physics (2014–2019)

=== Awards ===
As a LIPI scientist, he was awarded by:

- Adidharma Profession Award, Indonesian Engineer Association (2010)
- New Inventions That Are Beneficial to the Country Award, Indonesian Institute of Sciences (2010)
- The 400 most highly cited papers of All Time in the field of High Energy Physics - Phenomenology (2009)
- Outstanding Intellectual Property Award 2009 for Science in the sub-category of Computer, Ministry of Education and Culture (2009)
- 101 Most Prospective Innovation 2009.
- Satyalancana Wira Karya (2009)
- Nominee Finalist of Research and Development Category, INAICTA 2009, Department of Communication and Information Technology (2009)
- Achmad Bakrie Award for Science (2008)
- Recognition Award of the e-Government and Services Category, APICTA Indonesia 2006, Indonesian Institute of Sciences (2006)
- Habibie Award of Basic Science (2004), Ministry of Research and Technology
- Winner of the Best Research and Development Category, APICTA Indonesia 2004, Indonesian Institute of Sciences (2004)
- Winner of the Best Education and Training Category, APICTA Indonesia 2004, Indonesian Institute of Sciences (2003)
- Young Indonesian Scientist Award, in the field of Natural and Environmental Science (2002)

As Chairman of BRIN, he was awarded The Chinese Government's Friendship Award by the Government of China. In his citation, he is credited with organizing collaborations in the field of nuclear and space research between Indonesia and China. The award was presented by the Chinese Ambassador to Indonesia, Lu Kang on 26 April 2022.

== Controversies ==
As Chairman of LIPI, he was seen as "revolutionary" by implementing revolutionary policies for LIPI reorganization. The most important revolutionary policy during his time were the reorganization of LIPI, which at time the size is very big due to having many non-optimal subunits into slimmer organization and archiving revolution. Due to his revolutionary policies, he was protested by his seniors at LIPI.

His leadership style as leader of BRIN seen as "one man show leadership" and lack of compromising criticized and protested by his seniors and former colleagues. He was also become the center of polemic due to human resource issue resulted on Eijkman Institute of Molecular Biology liquidation in early 2022.

Political offices
Preceded by Bambang Brodjonegoro	Chairman of National Research and Innovation Agency; 2021–2025	Succeeded by Arif Satria
