= RPS-420 =

Proposed Indonesian space launch vehicle

- Function: Experimental carrier rocket
- Manufacturer: LAPAN
- Country of origin: Indonesia

Size
- Height: 6.2 m (20 ft)
- Diameter: 42 cm (17 in)
- Mass: 1,000 kg (2,200 lb)
- Stages: 4

Capacity

Payload to Low Earth orbit
- Mass: 25 kg (55 lb)

Associated rockets
- Family: RX (rocket family)
- Derivative work: RPS-420

Launch history
- Status: Operational
- Launch sites: Pameungpeuk Spaceport
- Carries passengers or cargo: RX-420 is suitable for launch of micro-satellites (50 kilograms (110 lb) or less) and nano-satellites (5 kilograms (11 lb) or less)

Satellite Orbiting Rocket Number 420 (Indonesian: Roket Pengorbit Satelit 420, abbreviated as RPS-420), or Pengorbitan-1, was a proposed space launch vehicle under consideration in Indonesia from 2008 to 2012. Recent developments have focused on a larger core stage called RX-420 and a smaller upper stage called RX-320. Therefore, this particular version RPS-420 is no longer being pursued. However, the goal remains valid: Indonesia aims to reach orbit with self-made rockets and satellites in order to become an Asian space power.

The RPS or "Pengorbitan" (Indonesian for "orbital") will be an ultra-light orbital launch vehicle derived from the "RX" (Roket Eksperimental) rocket family. Several multistage launchers are being developed by the state company Spacetecx for Indonesia's National Institute of Aeronautics and Space (LAPAN). They will be launched from the Stasiun Peluncuran Roket facility in Pameungpeuk, where RX-250-LPN mini-rockets have blasted off already. No timeline for the first flight has been announced.

== Earlier plans ==
Currently, Indonesian RX rockets have suborbital capabilities only and could serve as a platform for high altitude outer atmosphere studies. Indonesia plans to develop orbital microsatellite launching capabilities with the RPS to launch small satellites into low Earth orbit (LEO). This project was first revealed to the public during the Indo Defence Expo-2008 exhibition in Jakarta.

In 2008, optimistic hopes were that this rocket, known as SLV (Satellite Launch Vehicle) would first be launched in Indonesia in 2012, and if there were extra funds pursuant to the good economic situation of 2007–2008, possibly in 2010. In fact, the LAPAN budget for 2008 and 2007 was Rp 200 billion (approximately US$20million). Budgetary issues surrounding the international credit crises of 2008-2009 placed many Indonesian technical projects in jeopardy most especially the complete development of RX-450 and associated microsatellite program to world-class standards ahead of project finalization schedule and the opportunity to work together with the world institutions. LAPAN hopes to be an educating partner with Indian Aerospace in sciences related to satellite.

=== Pengorbitan-1 ===
Pengorbitan-1, or RPS/RX-420, will be a four-stage rocket with the ability to place 25 kg (55 lb) satellites in LEO.

Category: microsatellite orbital launch vehicle, similar to Lambda from Japan, but with lighter modern materials and modern avionics. Launch unguided at a 70° angle of inclination with a four-stage solid rocket motor launcher.

Diameter: 42 cm (17 in) Length: 620 cm (240 in) Lift-off mass: 1,000 kg (2,200 lb) Propellant: solid composite, firing time 13 seconds Thrust: 9.6 t (9.4 long tons; 10.6 short tons) Flight duration: 205 seconds Maximum velocity: Mach 4.5 Range: 101 km (63 mi), 53,000 m (174,000 ft) of altitude Payload: diagnostic, GPS, altimeter, gyroscope, 3-axis accelerometer, processor and battery The RX-420 was entirely built using local materials.

LAPAN carried out a stationary test on RX-420 on 23 December 2008 in Tarogong, West Java. The RX-420 missile was tested at the launching station Cilauteureun, Pameungpeuk District, Garut regency, West Java. The LAPAN RX-420 is the test bed for the entirely indigenously developed satellite launch vehicle. RX-420 is suitable for launch of micro-satellites (50 kg or less) and nano-satellites (5 kg or less) currently in co-development with Technische Universität Berlin.

The rocket launching plan will be extended in 2010 by launching combined RX-420-420 and in 2011 for combined RX-420-420 – 320 and SOB 420.

=== Pengorbitan-2 ===
The five-stage Pengorbitan-2, or RX-420 Plus and RX-520, will launch a 50 kg payload to Low Earth orbit.

At planning stage are the RX-420 with multiple customizable configuration boosters and the planned 52 cm RX-520. The RX-520 is predicted to be able to launch 100 kg+ payload into orbit. This large rocket is intended to be fueled by high-pressure liquid. Hydrogen peroxide and various hydrocarbons are under evaluation. Addition of RX-420 boosters to the RX-520 is calculated to increase lifting capacity to 500 kg+ payload, although if too expensive, the proven Russian Soyuz and Energia will likely be employed.

RX-520 consists of one RX-420 and two boosters of RX-420 in stage-1, one RX-420 in stage-2, one RX-420 in stage-3 and as a payload launcher one RX-320 in stage-4.

At 11 November 2010, LAPAN spokesman said the RX-550 rocket would undergo a static test in December this year and a flight test in 2012. The rocket will consist of four stages, will be part of an RPS-01 rocket to put a satellite in orbit.
