= Naga-L =

- Function: Small-lift carrier rocket
- Manufacturer: CALT
- Country of origin: China
- Cost per launch: $10 million

Size
- Height: 22.9 m (75 ft)
- Diameter: 3.35 m (11.0 ft)
- Mass: 98,227 kg (216,553 lb)
- Stages: 2

Capacity

Payload to LEO (400 km)
- Mass: 1,590 kg (3,510 lb) from Indonesia; 1,545 kg (3,406 lb) from Tanzania

Payload to SSO (500 km)
- Mass: 820 kg (1,810 lb) from China; 700 kg (1,500 lb) from Sweden

Payload to LEO (800 km)
- Mass: 600 kg (1,300 lb) from Indonesia

Associated rockets
- Family: derived from Long March

Launch history
- Status: In development
- Launch sites: (tentative): Jiuquan, China; Esrange, Sweden; Pameungpeuk, Indonesia; Tanzania

First stage
- Diameter: 3.35 m (11.0 ft)
- Empty mass: 6,940 kg (15,300 lb)
- Propellant mass: 77,000 kg (170,000 lb)
- Powered by: 1 YF-100
- Maximum thrust: 1,200 kN (270,000 lb_{f})
- Specific impulse: 300 seconds (2.9 km/s)
- Propellant: LOX / Kerosene

Second stage
- Diameter: 3.0 m (9.8 ft)
- Empty mass: 2,685 kg (5,919 lb)
- Propellant mass: 10,498 kg (23,144 lb)
- Powered by: 1 YF-75
- Maximum thrust: 83.3 kN (18,700 lb_{f})
- Specific impulse: 438 seconds (4.30 km/s)
- Propellant: LOX / LH2

Naga-L, also called Naga-1, is a light carrier rocket under development by the China Academy of Launch Vehicle Technology (CALT). It is designed to compete on the international market for small-lift launch vehicles.

The project was unveiled on 14 October 2015 by Dr. Haoliang Yang during the 66th International Astronautical Congress in Jerusalem. A first launch was planned for 2017. In addition to its domestic Jiuquan Satellite Launch Center in the Gobi Desert, CALT is considering potential launches of Naga-L from spaceports in Sweden (Esrange), Indonesia (Pameungpeuk) and Tanzania.

Due to ITAR restrictions imposed by the United States which limit the distribution of US manufactured components with military applications, China can't import US produced satellites to its own territory, which prevents their Long March rockets from competing in the worldwide commercial launch services market. Naga-L would bypass these constraints by exporting the rockets instead of importing the satellites.

Using components from the Long March rocket family, notably the YF-75 and YF-100 engines, Naga-L could deliver up to 1,600 kg (3,500 lb) to a 400-kilometre (250-mile) circular low Earth orbit from Lapan and 900 kg (2,000 lb) to a 400-km Sun-synchronous orbit from Esrange or Jiuquan. Pricing would start at $10 million per mission.

== See also ==
- Carrier rocket
- Small-lift launch vehicle
- Long March rocket family
- Low Earth orbit
- Sun-synchronous orbit
- China Academy of Launch Vehicle Technology
- Jiuquan Satellite Launch Center
- Esrange
- International Traffic in Arms Regulations
