= I22 =

I22 or I 22 may refer to:

- Interstate 22, a highway in the United States
- Värmland Regiment, a Swedish infantry regiment; active 1816–1939
- Lapland Ranger Regiment, a Swedish infantry regiment; active 1975–2000
- Japanese submarine I-22, several submarines
- Infoglobal I-22 Sikatan, an Indonesian fighter aircraft concept
