= Inasa =

Inasa may refer to:

== Places ==
- Inasa, Shizuoka (引佐町, Inasa-chō), a former town in Inasa District, Shizuoka Prefecture, Japan
- Inasa District, Shizuoka (引佐郡, Inasa-gun), a former rural district in Shizuoka Prefecture, Japan
- Mount Inasa (稲佐山, Inasa-yama), a hill to the west of Nagasaki, Nagasaki Prefecture, Japan

== Fictional characters ==
- Kirio Inasa (引狭 霧雄), a character from Ushio and Tora
- Inasa Yoarashi (夜嵐 イナサ), a character from My Hero Academia

== Other ==
- Indonesian Space Agency (INASA)
