= Kurkjian =

Kurkjian or Kurkdjian (Armenian: Քյուրքչյան, derived from Turkish "kürkçü" [kürk "fur" + çü "agentive/profession suffix"], meaning "furrier") is an Armenian surname. Notable people with the surname include:

- Francis Kurkdjian (born 1969), French perfumer and businessman
- Ohannes Kurkdjian (1851–1903), Armenian photographer
- Stephen Kurkjian, American journalist
- Tim Kurkjian (born 1956), American Major League Baseball analyst, cousin of Stephen
- Vahan Kurkjian (1863–1961), Armenian author, historian, teacher, and community leader
