= LAPAN LSU-02 =

Indonesian UAV

LSU-02
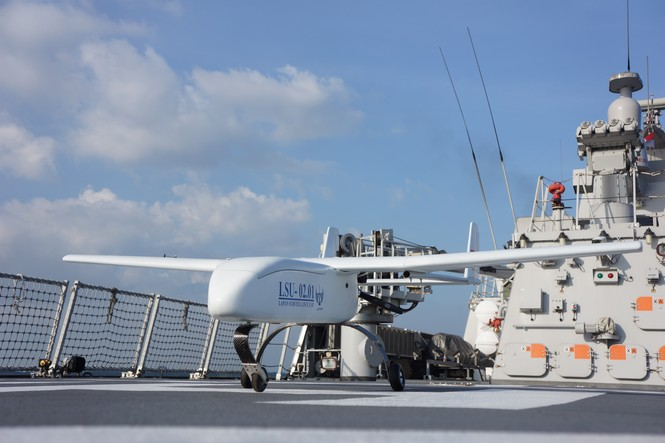
- LSU-02 aboard KRI Frans Kaisiepo (368), 2013

General information
- Type: Surveillance UAV
- National origin: Indonesia
- Manufacturer: National Institute of Aeronautics and Space (LAPAN)

History
- Manufactured: 2012–2024

The LAPAN LSU-02 (LAPAN Surveillance UAV-02) is an unmanned aerial vehicle (UAV) developed by the National Institute of Aeronautics and Space (LAPAN) of Indonesia. It was developed in 2012 for both civilian and military purposes. The Indonesian military classifies it as a tactical UAV because of its ability to fly over long ranges (300 km, theoretically 450 km) for its size. It broke an Indonesian record for longest ranged UAV built locally.

== Operational history ==
Under an agreement between LAPAN and the Indonesian Navy, the LSU-02 was tested during the 2013 Indonesian National Armed Forces joint exercise in the Java Sea. The UAV was launched from the helicopter deck of the corvette KRI Frans Kaisiepo (368). The mission was to provide target surveillance for an Exocet MM40 missile. The UAV can loiter autonomously near its target, with average speed of 70 km/h (43 mph). During the exercise, the UAV flew for 2 hours and 45 minutes, covering about 200 km. It achieved a national record for UAV with the furthest distance covered by Indonesian World Records Museum (MURI) on 2 June 2013, when it flew a nonstop round trip from Pameungpeuk airfield in Garut Regency to Nusawiru in Pangandaran Regency, a distance of 200 km (120 mi) in total.

In 2016, an LSU-02 was used to photograph 300 km (190 mi) of the coastline south of Java Island, as part of a data collection project to update mapping of the territorial coastline of Indonesia. The LSU-02 photographed Java's southern coastline, starting from Parangtritis, Yogyakarta, to Popoh Beach, Trenggalek, East Java. Photographing continued on Pacitan beach, East Java on its 100 km (62 mi) coastline.

== Development ==
In 2018, LAPAN unveiled a new version of LSU-02, dubbed LSU-02 NGLD (New Generation, Long Distance) during National Technological Expo to commemorate National Technology Awakening Day in Pekanbaru. It then broke its previous MURI record by achieving 405 km (252 mi) range of flight on 17 July 2019.

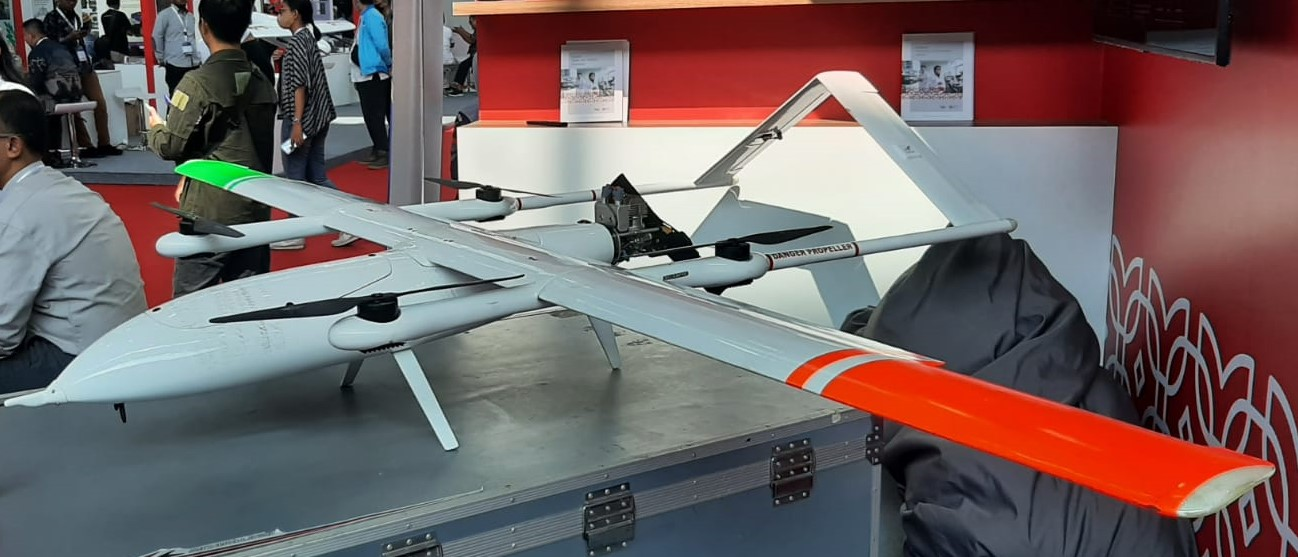
LSU 02 VTOL exhibited at Inari Expo 2023

In 2021, LAPAN tested a hybrid VTOL version of LSU-02 drone in its facility at Pameungpeuk, Garut, West Java. This VTOL version has extra rotors positioned at the front end and rear end of a spar positioned on each wing. Its MTOW increased by 5 kg (23 kg), while its fuel capacity is 3.8 kg, theoretically able to sustain 2.5–3 hours flight. LSU-02 VTOL was designed mainly for mapping, surveillance, and monitoring.

== Specifications (LSU-02) ==
Data from Manufacturer

General characteristics

- Crew: none
- Capacity: 3 kg (6.6 lb)
- Length: 1.7 m (5 ft 7 in)
- Wingspan: 2.4 m (7 ft 10 in)
- Empty weight: 15 kg (33 lb)
- Max takeoff weight: 18 kg (40 lb)
- Fuel capacity: 5 L (1.3 US gal; 1.1 imp gal)

Performance

- Maximum speed: 100 km/h (62 mph, 54 kn)
- Range: 450 km (280 mi, 240 nmi)
- Endurance: 5 hours (3 hours for VTOL version)
- Service ceiling: 3,000 m (9,800 ft)

== See also ==
- Lapan LSU-03
