= RX100 =

RX100 may refer to:

- Sony Cyber-shot DSC-RX100, a digital camera
- Yamaha RX 100, a motorcycle
- RX-100, an Indonesian RX-family rocket
- RX 100, a 2018 Indian Telugu-language film
