= LAPAN LSU-03 =

Unmanned aerial vehicle of Indonesia

LSU-03
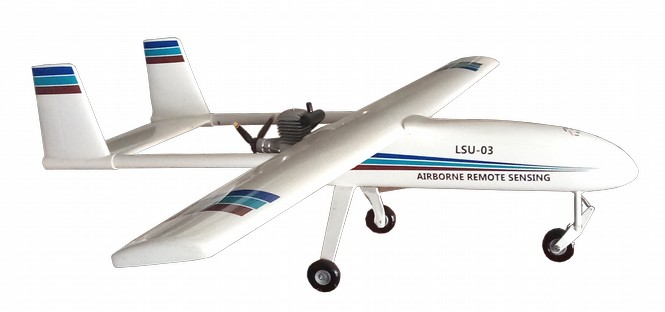

General information
- Type: Surveillance UAV
- National origin: Indonesia
- Manufacturer: National Institute of Aeronautics and Space (LAPAN), PT Mandiri Mitra Muhibbah (M3)
- Designer: LAPAN

History
- Manufactured: 2013–2016
- First flight: 25 January 2014
- Developed from: LAPAN LSU-02

The LAPAN LSU-03 (LAPAN Surveillance UAV-03) is an (unmanned aerial vehicle) developed by the National Institute of Aeronautics and Space (LAPAN) of Indonesia. It is a further development of LAPAN LSU-02, and both are classified as a tactical UAV. While it is basically a further development of LSU-02, LSU-03 can achieve maximum range about 133% of its predecessor (600 km (370 mi) compared to 450 km (280 mi) of LSU-02) and significantly more payload.

== Design and development ==
The LSU-03 development started after the success of LSU-02. First flight take place on 25 January 2014 to test the stability of pre-production model. This pre-production model has a theoretical range of 350 km (220 mi) and 10 kg (22 lb) payload. Technically LSU-03 has a cruising speed of 100 km/h (62 mph) and maximum speed of 150 km/h (93 mph). It uses a 2-cylinder 100cc piston engine, 24x12 pusher propeller, 7 litre Pertamax Plus fuel and lippo battery.

In period 2015–2016, LAPAN developed a higher performance LSU-03, dubbed LSU-03 NG (Next Generation). While the former version has a 350 km and 10 kg payload, this version has a 600 km (370 mi) range and 24 kg (53 lb) payload. This improvement is believed due to reducement of weight. The new version adopted GFRP material (Glass Fiber Reinforced Polymer) with plywood as support in semi monocoque concept. Similar material technology has been used on LSU-05 drone.

The payload of LSU-03 consists of a FLIR camera, Lippo battery and other electronics. It can be controlled using radio or autonomously using mission planner from GCS. It has an anti jamming technology installed, even if it is jammed, it will automatically return to its former take-off area.

== Operational history ==
In November 2015, LSU-03 took flight for a photographing mission from Pameungpeuk to Pelabuhan Ratu and return to Pameungpeuk. The mission broke new MURI record for longest UAV range, which is 340 km (210 mi) in 3 hour and 39 minutes. The previous record holder was LSU-02, that flew 200 km (120 mi) in 2 hour 37 minutes.

== Specifications ==
Data from Manufacturer

General characteristics

- Crew: none
- Capacity: 24 kg (53 lb)
- Length: 2.5 m (8 ft 2 in)
- Wingspan: 3.5 m (11 ft 6 in)
- Empty weight: 24 kg (53 lb)
- Max takeoff weight: 48 kg (106 lb)
- Fuel capacity: 7 L (1.8 US gal; 1.5 imp gal)
- Powerplant: 1 × 100cc piston engine

Performance

- Maximum speed: 150 km/h (93 mph, 81 kn)
- Cruise speed: 100 km/h (62 mph, 54 kn)
- Range: 600 km (370 mi, 320 nmi)
- Endurance: 6 hours

== See also ==
- Lapan LSU-02
