= Stasiun Peluncuran Roket =

Spaceport

LAPAN Rocket Launching Station
- Stasiun Peluncuran Roket Pameungpeuk
- Interactive map of the LAPAN Rocket Launching Station area
- Alternative names: Balai Produksi dan Pengujian Roket LAPAN

General information
- Status: Active
- Location: Cilautereun, Pameungpeuk, Garut, West Java, Indonesia
- Coordinates: 7.646643°S 107.689018°E
- Opened: August 1965
- Owner: LAPAN; Government of Indonesia

Design and construction
- Architect: Hideo Itokawa

Website
- https://tekgan.lapan.go.id/

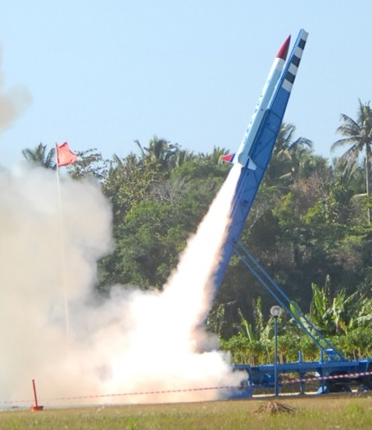
The launch of RX-320 at Pameungpeuk Spaceport, 2008

Stasiun Peluncuran Roket or Staspro (literally "Rocket Launching Station") is a rocket launch site managed by the Indonesian National Institute of Aeronautics and Space (LAPAN). It is located at Pameungpeuk Beach in the Garut Regency on West Java near Cilautereun and has been active since 1965 to perform engine tests and launch sounding rockets.

The facility was built from 1963 through cooperation between Indonesia and Japan, as the station was designed by Hideo Itokawa with the aim to support high-atmospheric research using Kappa-8 rockets. The first Kappa launch from Pameungpeuk took place on 7 August 1965. Today the site comprises a Motor Assembly building, a Launch Control Center, a Meteorological Sounding System building, a Rocket Motor Storage hangar and a dormitory.

The site has launched numerous solid-fuel rockets from the RX family (Roket Eksperimental), in particular the RX-250-LPN. Newer developments focus on building multi-stage rockets from individual RX elements, under the moniker RPS for Roket Pengorbit Satelit (literally "Satellite Orbiting Rocket"). The agency's goal is to reach orbit with indigenous rockets and satellites.

== See also ==
- List of human spaceflights
- Launch pad
- Office of Commercial Space Transportation (United States)
- Range safety
