= Kartika I =

Kartika I is an Indonesian sounding rocket built by LAPAN, AURI, Bandung Institute of Technology, and Pindad under PRIMA (Sounding and Military Rocket Development Project/Indonesian: Proyek Pengembangan Roket Ilmiah dan Militer Awal) project. This rocket was launched on August 14, 1964, in LAPAN Rocket Launching Station Pameungpeuk, West Java, becoming the first sounding rocket ever launched in Indonesia, and the fourth in Asia after Japan through Kappa Rocket, China with T-7 and Pakistan with the Rehbar series.

== History ==
On May 31, 1962, Indonesian government under Sukarno commenced aeronautics exploration when the Aeronautics Committee was established by the Indonesian Vice Prime Minister I, Juanda, who was also the head of Indonesian Aeronautics. The secretary of Indonesian Aeronautics, RJ Salatun, was also involved in the establishment.

On September 22, 1962, the PRIMA project was formed as an affiliation of AURI (Indonesian Air Force) and ITB (Bandung Institute of Technology). The outcome of the project was the launching of "Kartika"("star") series rockets and it's telemetric ordnances on August 14, 1964, in LAPAN Launching Station Pameungpeuk, West Java.

PRIMA project as one of the subproject of Outer Space Ionosphere Rocket Project (Proyek Roket Ionosfer Angkasa Luar) that is known as "Project S" was led by Laksda (Rear Admiral) Udara Budiardjo and Kolonel (Colonel) Udara RJ Salatun.

== Version ==
Kartika rocket series only has one version, Kartika I.

Kartika I

- Payload: 5 kg
- Maximum flight height: 60 km
- Launch mass: 220 kg
- Length: 10.5 m

== See also ==
- LAPAN
