= Indonesian Space Agency =

Space agency

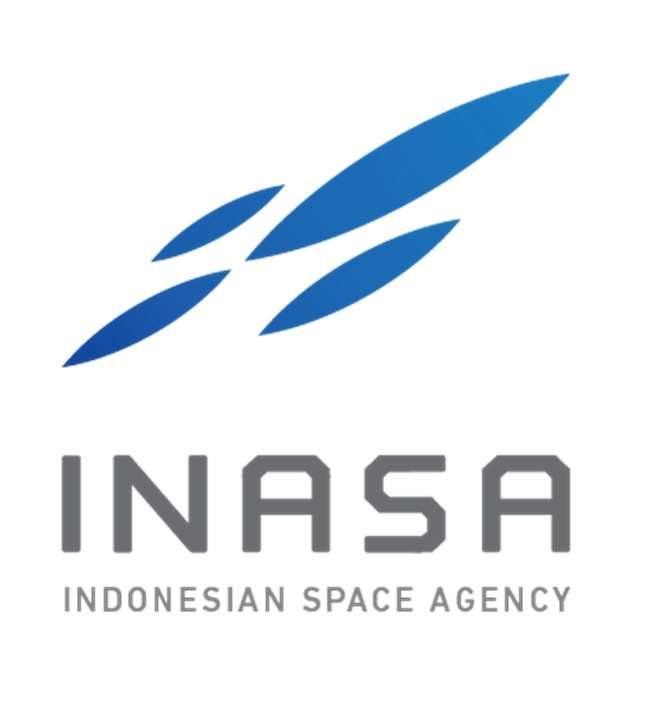
- INASA logo

Agency overview
- Abbreviation: INASA
- Formed: 1 March 2022; 4 years ago
- Preceding agency: National Institute of Aeronautics and Space (1963–2021)
- Type: Space agency
- Jurisdiction: Government of Indonesia
- Headquarters: Jalan Jenderal Gatot Subroto, South Jakarta, DKI Jakarta
- Executive Director: Erna Sri Adiningsih
- Website: https://brin.go.id/inasa
- National Research and Innovation Agency

Indonesian Space Agency or INASA is the Indonesian space agency engaged in activities related to outer space and space exploration policy. INASA differs compared to Research Organization for Aeronautics and Space (Indonesian: Organisasi Riset Penerbangan dan Antariksa, ORPA), because INASA does not perform space research activities, but is more a coordinative agency and is designed as a space lobby and policy making agency.

== History ==
Before being dismantled, the National Institute of Aeronautics and Space (Indonesian: Lembaga Penerbangan dan Antariksa Nasional, LAPAN) was both the research institute and policy making institution for outer space and space exploration in Indonesia. As mandated by Law No. 21/2013, LAPAN was mandated to perform space research activity in both policy research and experimental research, performing space lobby and negotiations with the space agency of another country or supranational entities or international bodies, coordinating policies in space policy, and registration of astronomical objects.

LAPAN was liquidated on 1 September 2021 in favor for formation of integrated super-agency, the National Research and Innovation Agency (Indonesian: Badan Riset dan Inovasi Nasional, BRIN). By Presidential Decree No. 78/2021, LAPAN was mandated to relinquish its rights and responsibilities to BRIN. While the research functions of the former LAPAN were swiftly subsumed into BRIN, its political functions were not yet reorganized into BRIN. As result of LAPAN liquidation, for a brief time, Indonesia technically did not have functioning space agency as mandated by Law No. 21/2013, solely a space research agency.

In March 2022, INASA was formed as a special body under BRIN for Indonesia to carry on space political functions, including coordinating space policies, political lobby, preparation and delegation of Indonesian space scientists to lobby and negotiate with space agency of another country or supranational entities or international bodies, and registration of astronomical objects. Formation of INASA in BRIN has the goal of separating research functions from political functions, so both functions was not mixed.

== Activities ==
During the 29th Asia-Pacific Regional Space Agency Forum (APRSAF-29), INASA announced that the institution, with Government of Indonesia, will finalize the Indonesian Space Masterplan. Including to the masterplan are spaceport building replacing the current Indonesian Stasiun Peluncuran Roket, and regulations to promote advancement of space industries in Indonesia.
