= RX-250-LPN =

The RX-250-LPN is an Indonesian sounding rocket, part of the RX rocket family. It was launched six times between 1987 and 2007.

== Technical data ==
Specifications come from the rocket's summary datasheet published by Indonesian space agency LAPAN.

- Apogee: 70 kilometres
- Liftoff thrust: 53 kilonewtons
- Burning time: 6 seconds
- Specific impulse: 220 seconds
- Propellant: HTPB
- Total mass: 300 kilograms
- Core diameter: 0.25 metres
- Total length: 5.30 metres
- Payload: 30–60 kg
