= LAPAN Fighter Experimental (LFX) =

Proposed Indonesian fifth-generation stealth fighter project

General information
- Type: Fifth-generation stealth multirole fighter
- National origin: Indonesia
- Manufacturer: LAPAN
- Status: Frozen

History
- Developed into: Technical contributions to the KFX/IFX program

The LAPAN Fighter Experimental (LFX) was a conceptual research and development program for an Indonesian fifth-generation stealth aircraft. Initiated by the National Institute of Aeronautics and Space (LAPAN) in 2012, the project aimed to strengthen Indonesia's domestic defense industry. The LFX was designed with a focus on stealth capabilities, utilizing comparative studies of advanced platforms such as the Lockheed Martin F-22 Raptor, F-35, and Sukhoi Su-57.

== History ==
In 2012, after the Ministry of Defense requested basic information on a fifth-generation fighter aircraft, LAPAN began research for what became the Lapan Fighter Experiment, or LFX, a concept first developed under the Ministry of Research and Technology research program to support national fighter aircraft capability and the KFX/IFX development program. The initial work involved a small team of researchers producing a conceptual design, including the external configuration and aerodynamic testing through wind-tunnel and computational fluid dynamics simulation.

The LFX program was intended to run for about ten years, but it did not continue beyond the early phase. In 2013 the project was suspended because no further funding was available. Around the same time, most of LAPAN's aerospace personnel were assigned to the N-219 civil aircraft program with Indonesian Aerospace, which had become a higher priority and required substantial resources. As a result, work on LFX, including plans to build a flying model, could not proceed.

== Development ==
The conceptual design of the LFX emerged in 2012 following a request from the Indonesian Ministry of Defense to explore the feasibility of a domestic air superiority fighter. However, by 2013, the program was officially "frozen" or suspended indefinitely.

Several critical factors led to the suspension of the project:

- Financial Constraints: The immense R&D costs associated with fifth-generation technology exceeded the national defense budget available at the time.
- Strategic Priorities: The Indonesian government and LAPAN shifted their primary focus and engineering workforce toward the development of the N-219 regional commuter aircraft, which was deemed more realistic and economically urgent.
- Technological Barriers: Developing stealth technology independently presented a significant challenge. Since major powers rarely share sensitive stealth data, it was estimated that Indonesia would require decades of independent research and massive investment to master the technology.

While the LFX never reached the prototype stage, the preliminary research provided Indonesian engineers with vital competencies in supersonic aerodynamics, which later supported Indonesia's partnership with South Korea in the KFX/IFX program.

== Conceptual specifications ==
Data from manufacturer

=== General characteristics ===
- Crew: 1
- Length: 19 m (62 ft 4 in)
- Wingspan: 14 m (45 ft 11 in)
- Height: 5 m (16 ft 5 in)
- Max takeoff weight (MTOW): ~35,000 kg (77,161 lb)
- Powerplant: 2 × Shenyang WS-10G afterburning turbofans (proposed candidate engines) providing approximately 155,000 N of thrust each.

=== Performance ===
- Maximum speed: Mach 2.0
- Service ceiling: 40,000 ft (capable of reaching altitude in 6 minutes)
- Avionics: Planned integration of AESA radar, radar jammers, and missile approach warning systems.

== See also ==
- KAI KF-21 Boramae
- Infoglobal I-22 Sikatan
- N-219
