= National Institute of Aeronautics and Space =

Former Indonesian space agency

Indonesian National Institute of Aeronautics and Space
- Lembaga Penerbangan dan Antariksa Nasional
- LAPAN logo

Agency overview
- Abbreviation: LAPAN
- Formed: November 27, 1963; 62 years ago
- Dissolved: September 1, 2021; 5 years ago
- Superseding agencies: Research Organization for Aeronautics and Space; Indonesian Space Agency of National Research and Innovation Agency
- Type: Space agency
- Headquarters: Rawamangun, Pulo Gadung, DKI Jakarta
- Administrator: Thomas Djamaluddin
- Primary spaceport: Pamengpeuk Spaceport
- Employees: 1,246 (2020)
- Annual budget: Rp.792 billion (US$55 million) (2019)
- Website: www.lapan.go.id

The National Institute of Aeronautics and Space (Indonesian: Lembaga Penerbangan dan Antariksa Nasional, LAPAN) was the Indonesian government's space agency. It was established on 27 November 1963, by former Indonesian president Sukarno, after one year's existence of a previous, informal space agency organization. LAPAN is responsible for long-term civilian and military aerospace research.

For over two decades, LAPAN managed satellites, including the domain-developed small scientific-technology satellite LAPAN-TUBsat and the Palapa series of telecommunication satellites, which were built by Hughes (now Boeing Satellite Systems) and launched from the US on Delta rockets, or from French Guiana using Ariane 4 and Ariane 5 rockets. LAPAN has also developed sounding rockets and has been trying to develop small orbital space launchers. The LAPAN A1, in 2007, and LAPAN A2, in 2015, satellites were launched by India.

With the enactment of Presidential Decree No. 33/2021 on 5 May 2021, LAPAN is due to be disbanded along with government research agencies such as the Agency of Assessment and Application of Technology (Indonesian: Badan Pengkajian dan Penerapan Teknologi, BPPT), National Nuclear Energy Agency (Indonesian: Badan Tenaga Nuklir Nasional, BATAN), and Indonesian Institute of Sciences (Indonesian: Lembaga Ilmu Pengetahuan Indonesia, LIPI). All of those agencies fused into newly formed National Research and Innovation Agency (Indonesian: Badan Riset dan Inovasi Nasional, BRIN). As of September 2021, the disbandment process is still on process and expected to be finished on 1 January 2022.

On 1 September 2021, LAPAN was finally dissolved as an independent agency and transformed into the space and aeronautics research organization of BRIN, signaling the beginning of the institutional integration of the former LAPAN into BRIN.

== History ==
On 31 May 1962, Indonesia commenced aeronautics exploration when the Aeronautics Committee was established by the Indonesian prime minister, Djuanda, who was also the head of Indonesian Aeronautics. The secretary of Indonesian Aeronautics, RJ Salatun, was also involved in the establishment.

On 22 September 1962, the Initial Scientific and Military Rocket Project (known in Indonesia as Proyek Roket Ilmiah dan Militer Awal or PRIMA) was formed by an affiliation of AURI (Indonesian Air Force) with ITB (Bandung Institute of Technology). The outcome of the project was the launching of two "Kartika I" ("star")–series rockets and their telemetric ordnances.

After two informal projects, the National Institute of Aeronautics and Space (LAPAN) was established in 1963 by Presidential Decree 236.

== Programs ==
For more than 20 years, LAPAN has done research on rocketry, remote sensing, satellites, and space sciences.

=== Satellites ===
==== Palapa A1 and A2 ====
The first program was the launching of the Palapa A1 (launched 7 August 1976) and A2 (launched 3 October 1977) satellites. These satellites were almost identical to Canada's Anik and Western Union's Westars. The Indonesian satellites belonged to the government-owned company Perumtel, but they were made in the United States.

==== LAPAN satellites ====
The development of microsatellites has become an opportunity for LAPAN. The development of such satellites requires only a limited budget and facilities, compared to the development of large satellites. Meanwhile, the capability to develop micro-satellite will brings LAPAN to be ready to implement a future space program that will have measurable economic impact, and therefore contribute to the country's sustainable development effort.

===== LAPAN-A1 =====
The LAPAN-A1, or LAPAN-TUBsat, is designed to develop knowledge, skill, and experience with micro-satellite technology development, in cooperation with Technische Universität Berlin, Germany, where the satellite was manufactured. The Indonesian spacecraft is based on the German DLR-Tubsat, but includes a new star sensor and features a new 45 × 45 × 27 cm structure. The satellite payload is a commercial off-the-shelf video camera with a 1000 mm lens, resulting in a nadir resolution of 5 m and nadir swath of 3.5 km from an altitude of 650 km. In addition, the satellite carries a video camera with a 50 mm lens, resulting in a 200 m resolution video image with swath of 80 km at the nadir. The uplink and downlink for telemetry, tracking, and command (TTC) is done in the UHF band and downlink for video is done in S-band analog. On 10 January 2007, the satellite was successfully launched from Sriharikota, India, as an auxiliary payload with India's Cartosat-2, in the ISRO's Polar Satellite Launch Vehicle (PSLV) C7, to a Sun-synchronous orbit of 635 km, with an inclination of 97.60° and a period of 99.039 minutes. The longitude shift per orbit is about 24.828° with a ground track velocity of 6.744 km/s with an angular velocity of 3.635 deg/s, and a circular velocity of 7.542 km/s. LAPAN Tubsat performed technological experiments, earth observation, and attitude control experiments.

===== LAPAN-A2 =====
The mission of LAPAN-A2, or LAPAN-ORARI, is Earth observation using an RGB camera, maritime traffic monitoring using an automatic identification system (AIS)—which can know name and flag of the ship registered, ship type, tonnage, current route, departure and arrival ports—and amateur radio communication (text and voice; ORARI is Indonesian Amateur Radio Organization). The satellite will be launched, as a secondary payload of India's ASTROSAT mission, into a circular orbit of 650 km with an inclination of 8 degrees. The purpose of the project is to develop the capability to design, assembly, integrate, and test (AIT) micro-satellites. The satellite was successfully launched on 28 September 2015 using India's ISRO Polar Satellite Launch Vehicle (PSLV) and will pass over Indonesia every 97 minutes, or 14 times a day.

===== LAPAN-A3 =====
LAPAN-A3, or LAPAN-IPB, will perform experimental remote sensing. In addition to that, the satellite will support a global AIS mission and amateur radio communication. The satellite payload is a four-band push broom multi-spectral imaging camera (Landsat band: B, G, R, NIR), which will give a resolution of 18 m and coverage of 120 km from 650 km altitude. The satellite was launched in June 2016.

=== International cooperation ===
In 2008 Indonesia signed an agreement with the National Space Agency of Ukraine (NSAU) that will allow Indonesia access to rocket and satellite technologies.

=== Spaceport development plan ===
==== Biak Spaceport plan (2006) ====
Since 2006, Indonesia and Russia have been discussing the possibility of launching a satellite from Biak island using air launch technology. LAPAN and the Russian Federal Space Agency (RKA) have worked on a government-to-government space cooperation agreement in order to enable such activities in Indonesia. The plan is for an Antonov An-124 aircraft to deliver a Polyot space launch vehicle to the new Indonesian spaceport on Biak island (West Papua province). This spaceport is well suited to commercial launches, as it sits almost exactly on the equator (the nearer the equator the greater the initial velocity imparted to the launched craft, making higher velocity or heavier payloads possible). In the spaceport, the launch vehicle will be fueled, and the satellites will be loaded on it. The Antonov An-124 would then fly to 10 km altitude above the ocean east of Biak island to jettison the launch vehicle. In 2012, discussions resumed. The main stumbling block is Russian concerns over compliance with the terms of the Missile Technology Control Regime; Russia is a co-signatory, Indonesia is not. In 2019, LAPAN officially confirmed plans for building the Biak spaceport, with first flights expected in 2024.

==== Enggano Launchpad plan (2011) ====
In 2011, LAPAN planned to build a satellite to be launchpad at Enggano Island, Bengkulu province, located in the westernmost part of Indonesia, on the Indian Ocean. There are three possible locations, two in Kioyo Natural Park and one in Gunung Nanua Bird Park. The most strategic site for this launchpad is inside Nanua Bird Park, a place called Tanjung Laboko, which is 20 meters above sea level and far from residential areas. The satellite launch pad itself sits on only one hectare of ground, but the safety zone covers 200 hectares. The cost to be disbursed is Rp.40 trillion (around $4.5 billion). The location can handle the assembly of the rockets and launch preparations for satellites of up to 3.8 tonnes. The Bengkulu Natural Resources Conservation Agency has expressed concerns about the plan, because both parks are habitats for a number of bird species native to Enggano Island. The Bengkulu provincial government refused to consider those concerns.

==== Morotai Spaceport plan (2012) ====
After studying the surrounding environment at three potential spaceport island sites (Enggano-Bengkulu, Morotai-North Maluku, and Biak-Papua), LAPAN (21/11) announced Morotai Island as a future spaceport site. Planning started in December 2012. The launch site's completion is expected for 2025. In 2013, LAPAN planned to launch an RX-550 experimental satellite launcher from a location in Morotai to be decided. This island was selected according to the following criteria:

- Morotai Island's location near the equator, which makes the launch more economical.
- The island's having seven runways, one of them 2,400 meters, easily extended to 3,000 meters.
- The ease of building on Morotai, which is not densely populated, and consequently little potential for social conflict with native inhabitants.
- Morotai Island's east side facing the Pacific Ocean directly, reducing downrange risks to other island populations.

== Field installations ==
=== Ground stations ===
==== Remote-sensing satellite ground station ====
The Stasiun Bumi Satelit Penginderaan Jauh (Remote Sensing Satellite Earth Station) is located at Parepare, South Sulawesi; it has been in operation since 1993. Its main functions include receiving and recording data from earth observation satellites such as Landsat, SPOT, ERS-1, JERS-1, Terra/Aqua MODIS, and NPP.

==== Weather satellite ground stations ====
These ground stations are located at Pekayon, Jakarta, and Biak; since 1982 they have been receiving, recording, and processing data from NOAA, MetOp, and Himawari weather satellites 24 times a day.

=== Rocket launch site ===
LAPAN manages Stasiun Peluncuran Roket (Rocket Launching Station) located at Pameungpeuk Beach in the Garut Regency on West Java (7.646643°S 107.689018°E). Starting in 1963, the facility was built through cooperation between Indonesia and Japan, as the station was designed by Hideo Itokawa, with the aim of supporting high atmospheric research using Kappa-8 rockets. This installation comprises a Motor Assembly building, a Launch Control Center, a Meteorological Sounding System building, a Rocket Motor Storage hangar, and a dormitory.

=== Radar ===
==== Koto Tabang Equator Atmospheric Radar ====
The Radar Atmosfer Khatulistiwa Koto Tabang is a radar facility located at Koto Tabang, West Sumatra. It commenced operations in 2001. This facility is used for atmospheric dynamics research, especially areas concerning global climate change, such as El Niño and La Niña climate anomalies.

== Laboratory ==
=== Remote Sensing Technology and Data Laboratory ===
The Remote Sensing Technology and Data Laboratory is located at Pekayon, Jakarta. Its functions include data acquisition systems development, satellite payload imager systems development, satellite ground station system development, preliminary satellite imagery image processing—such as making geometric, radiometric, and atmospheric corrections.

=== Remote Sensing Applications Laboratory ===
The Remote Sensing Applications Laboratory at Pekayon, Jakarta, works with remote sensing satellite data applications for Land Resource, Coastal-Marine Resources, Environment Monitoring, and Disaster Mitigation.

=== Rocket Motor Laboratory ===
The Laboratorium Motor Roket (Rocket Motor Laboratory) is located at Tarogong, West Java. It designs and produces rocket propulsion systems.

=== Propellant Laboratory ===
The Laboratorium Bahan Baku Propelan (Combustion Propellant Laboratory) researches propellants such as oxidizer Ammonium perchlorate and Hydroxyl-terminated polybutadiene.

=== Satellite Technology Laboratory ===
The Satellite Technology Laboratory is located at Rancabungur, West Java. Its functions include research, development, and engineering of the satellite payload, the satellite bus, and facilities of the ground segment.

=== Aviation Technology Laboratory ===
The Aviation Technology Laboratory is located at Rumpin, West Java. Its functions include research, development, and engineering of aerodynamics, flight mechanics technology, propulsion technology, avionics technology, and aerostructure.

== Observatories ==
In 2020, Indonesia joined other nations in the hunt for habitable-zone exoplanets, after completion of new astronomical observatory center at Kupang Regency in East Nusa Tenggara province.

=== Equatorial Atmosphere Observatory ===
The Equatorial Atmosphere Observatory of LAPAN is located at Koto Tabang, West Sumatera. It researches:

- High-resolution observations of wind vectors that will make it possible to study the detailed structure of the equatorial atmosphere, which is related to the growth and decay of cumulus convection;
- From long-term continuous observations, relationships between atmospheric waves and global atmospheric circulation;
- By conducting observations from near the surface to the ionosphere, it will be possible to reveal dynamical couplings between the equatorial atmosphere and ionosphere;
- Based on these results, transports of atmospheric constituents such as ozone and greenhouse gases, and the variations of the Earth's atmosphere that lead to climatic change such as El-Nino and La-Nina.

=== Solar Radiation Observatory ===
The Stasiun Pengamat Radiasi Matahari (Solar Radiation Observation Station) observes ultraviolet radiation of the sun. Operations began in 1992. These facilities were developed by Eko Instrument, of Japan, and are located at Bandung and Pontianak.

=== Aerospace Observatory ===
For decades, Indonesian astronomy depended on the Bosscha Observatory in Lembang, West Java, which was built in 1928 by the Dutch and which, at that time, had one of the largest telescopes in the southern hemisphere.

At present, the aerospace observatories of LAPAN are located at Pontianak-West Kalimantan, Pontianak-North Sulawesi, Kupang-East Nusa Tenggara, and Watukosek-East Java, and make observations relevant to climatology, meteorology, the sun, and Earth's magnetic field.

==== National Observatory (Obnas) ====
The new observatory construction project on Mount Timau in Kupang Regency, East Nusa Tenggara, which began functioning in 2020, is the biggest observatory in Southeast Asia. The observatory is built with the cooperation of the Bandung Institute of Technology (ITB), Nusa Cendana University (UNdana). It is designated as the National Observatory (Obnas), and has a 3.8 metres (12 ft) telescope.

The area around Obnas is developed as a national park, with the aim of attracting tourists. The aim of the observatory is to:

- develop Indonesian space science to a high degree
- economically strengthen the surrounding region, to allow for equitable distribution of inter-regional development, especially in Eastern Indonesia.

Obnas is one of LAPAN's key strategic objectives, along with mastery of rocket technology, building a launch site, growing its National Remote Sensing Data Bank (BDPJN) and National Earth Monitoring System (SPBN), and overall technological development.

== Rockets ==
LAPAN rockets are classified "RX" (Roket Eksperimental) followed by the diameter in millimeters. For example, the RX-100 has a diameter of 100 millimetres (3.9 in). LAPAN's current workhouse rocket propulsion system consists of four stages, namely the three-stage RX-420 and the RX-320 level. It is planned to use the RX-420 as a rocket booster for the planned Roket Pengorbit Satelit (RPS) (Orbital Satellite Rocket) to fly in 2014.

In 2008, optimistic hopes were that this rocket, known as the Satellite Launch Vehicle (SLV), would first be launched in Indonesia to 2012, and if there were extra funds pursuant to the good economic situation of 2007–8, possibly the year 2010. In fact, the LAPAN budget for 2008 and 2007 was Rp 200 billion (approximately US$20 million). Budgetary issues surrounding the international credit crises of 2008–2009 placed many Indonesian technical projects in jeopardy, most especially the complete development of RX-420 and associated micro-satellite program to world-class standards ahead of project finalization schedule and the opportunity to work together with the world institutions. LAPAN hopes to be an educating partner with Indian Aerospace in sciences related to satellite.

On November 11, 2010, a LAPAN spokesman said that the RX-550 rocket would undergo a static test in December 2010 and a flight test in 2012. The rocket would consist of four stages, and would be part of an RPS-01 rocket to put a satellite in orbit. Previously, the Polar LAPAN-TUBsat (LAPAN-A1) satellite had been successfully placed in orbit and is still functioning well. The aim is to have home-made rockets and satellites.

Beginning in 2005, LAPAN rejuvenated Indonesian expertise in rocket-based weapons systems, in cooperation with the Armed Forces of Indonesia (TNI). In April 2008, the TNI began a new missile research program, alongside LAPAN. Prior to this, eight projects were sponsored by the TNI in Malacca monitoring, using LAPAN-TUBsat, the theft of timber and alleged encroachment on Indonesian territorial waters in the 2009 escalation over Malaysia's claims to the huge gas fields off Ambalat-island.

=== RX-100 ===
The RX-100 serves to test rocket payload subsystems. It has a diameter of 110 millimetres (4.3 in), a length of 1,900 millimetres (75 in), and a mass of 30 kilograms (66 lb). It carries enough solid-composite propellant to last 2.5 seconds, which allows for a flight time of 70 seconds, at a maximum speed of Mach 1, at an altitude of 7,000 metres (23,000 ft), for a range of 11 kilometres (6.8 mi). The rocket carries a GPS, altimeter, gyroscope, 3-axis accelerometer, CPU, and battery.

=== RX-150 / 120 ===
The two-stage rocket booster RX-150-120 is supported by the Indonesian Army (TNI-AD) and PT Pindad. With a range of 24 kilometres (15 mi), it was successfully launched from a moving vehicle (Pindad Panser) on March 31, 2009.

=== R-Han 122 ===
The R-Han 122 rocket is a surface-to-surface missile with a range of up to 15 kilometres (9.3 mi) at Mach 1.8. As of March 28, 2012, fifty R-Han 122s have been successfully launched. The rockets are the result of six years work by LAPAN. By 2014, at least 500 R-Han 122 rockets will be part of the army arsenal.

=== RX-250 ===
Between 1987 and 2005, LAPAN RX-250 rockets have been regularly launched.

=== RX-320 ===
LAPAN successfully launched two 320-millimetre (13 in)-diameter RX-320 rockets on 30 May and 2 July 2008 at Pameungpeuk, West Java.

== Space launchers ==
=== RPS-420 (Pengorbitan-1) ===
The RPS-420 (Pengorbitan-1) is a micro-satellite orbital launch vehicle, similar to Lambda from Japan, but with lighter, modern materials and modern avionics. It is launched unguided at a 70-degree angle of inclination with a four-stage solid rocket motor launcher.

It has a diameter of 420 millimetres (17 in), a length of 6,200 millimetres (240 in), a lift-off mass of 1,000 kilograms (2,200 lb). It uses solid composite propellant, for a firing time of 13 seconds, yielding a thrust of 9.6 tons, for a flight duration of 205 seconds at a maximum velocity of Mach 4.5. Its range is 101 kilometres (63 mi) at an altitude of 53,000 metres (174,000 ft). Its payload consists of diagnostics, GPS, altimeter, gyro, 3-axis accelerometer, CPU, and battery. The RX-420 was entirely built using local materials.

LAPAN carried out a stationary test on the RX-420 on 23 December 2008 in Tarogong, West Java. The RX-420 had its first test flight at the launching station Cilauteureun, Pameungpeuk District, Garut regency, West Java. The LAPAN RX-420 is the test bed for an entirely indigenously developed satellite launch vehicle. The RX-420 is suitable for launching micro-satellites of 50 kilograms (110 lb) or less and nano-satellites of 5 kilograms (11 lb) or less in co-development with Technische Universität Berlin.

The rocket launching plan was extended in 2010 by launching combined RX-420-420s, and in 2011 for combined RX-420-420 – 320, and SOB 420.

=== RPS-420/520 (Pengorbitan-2) ===
In the planning stage are the RX-420 with multiple customizable configuration boosters and the planned 520 millimetres (20 in) RX-520, which is predicted to be able to launch a greater than 100 kilograms (220 lb) payload into orbit. This large rocket is intended to be fueled by high-pressure liquid hydrogen peroxide, and various hydrocarbons are under evaluation. The addition of RX-420 boosters to the RX-520 should increase lifting capacity to over 500 kilograms (1,100 lb), although if too expensive, the proven Russian Soyuz and Energiya rockets will likely be employed.

The RX-520 consists of one RX-420 and two RX-420 as a stage-1 booster, one RX-420 as stage 2, one RX-420 as stage 3, and as a payload launcher, one RX-320 as stage 4.

=== RX-550 ===
In 2013, LAPAN launched an RX-550 experimental satellite launcher from a point in Morotai.

== LAPAN Library ==
In June 2009, LAPAN put online its extensive library of over 8000 titles on aeronautics and astronautics. This is the largest dedicated aerospace library in ASEAN and it was hoped it would bring Indonesian and ASEAN talent into the LAPAN program, especially those disadvantaged by location. It was unclear how much content would be available freely to the public.

== Komurindo ==
Komurindo or Kompetisi Muatan Roket Indonesia is the Indonesia Payload Rocket Competition. The competition was established by LAPAN, the education ministry, and some universities, to enhance rocket research by the universities. The third competition was held in late June 2011 in Pandansimo Beach of Bantul, Yogyakarta.

== Aircraft ==
- LAPAN XT-400
- LSU-02
- LSU-03
- LAPAN Fighter Experimental (LFX)

== Logo ==
LAPAN logo used from 2006 to 2015

LAPAN logo used since 2015

== End of LAPAN ==
On 1 September 2021, LAPAN became the Space and Aeronautics Research Organization of the National Research and Innovation Agency (BRIN), signaling the beginning of the institutional integration of the former LAPAN into BRIN.

== See also ==
- List of government space agencies
- List of rocket launch sites
- Pratiwi Sudarmono
