= LAPAN XT-400 =

XT-400

General information
- Type: Utility aircraft
- National origin: Indonesia
- Manufacturer: LAPAN
- Status: Abandoned project

The LAPAN XT-400, (Lembaga Penerbangan dan Antariksa Nasional - National Institute of Aeronautics and Space), was a twin-engine STOL utility aircraft under development by the government of Indonesia in the late 1970s into the early 1980s. The programme was cancelled without the prototype having been completed or flown. It was to have provided passenger and cargo transport from rough and unprepared fields, with secondary roles as an aerial survey platform and air ambulance.

The design itself was that of a conventional, strut-braced, high-wing monoplane, similar in general appearance to the Britten-Norman Islander, but with an upswept rear fuselage to provide for clamshell cargo doors underneath the tail. The main units of the fixed, tricycle undercarriage were carried on short stub-wings on the lower fuselage, which also provided the attachment points for the wing struts. This arrangement allowed the fuselage to maintain a rectangular cross-section along its length without landing gear components or attachment points intruding into the cargo space. The original design was for an eight-seat aircraft, but a follow-on version with 12 seats was anticipated. Had it flown, the XT-400 would have been the first aircraft of Indonesian design to carry more than three people. Construction throughout was of metal.

Work on the prototype commenced in 1977, with a first flight anticipated in 1980. This however did not transpire, and the XT-400 project was cancelled in 1981 with the prototype still unfinished.

== Specifications (as designed) ==
General characteristics

- Crew: one pilot
- Capacity: seven passengers
- Length: 10.2 m (33 ft 6 in)
- Wingspan: 14.59 m (47 ft 11 in)
- Height: 4.30 m (14 ft 1 in)
- Wing area: 25.4 m^{2} (273 sq ft)
- Empty weight: 1,422 kg (3,136 lb)
- Gross weight: 2,540 kg (5,600 lb)
- Powerplant: 2 × Lycoming IO-540C , 187 kW (250 hp) each

Performance

- Maximum speed: 273 km/h (170 mph, 150 kn)
- Range: 965 km (600 mi, 520 nmi)
- Service ceiling: 4,665 m (15,300 ft)
