= Infoglobal I-22 Sikatan =

Indonesian jet fighter concept

- 3D Modeling from Infoglobal I-22 Sikatan for 3D illustration

General information
- Type: Block I: Multirole combat aircraft; Block II: Air superiority fighter
- National origin: Indonesia
- Manufacturer: Infoglobal Teknologi Semesta; National Research and Innovation Agency
- Designer: Vimana Litbang & Rekayasa
- Status: Prototype development

History
- Introduction date: Unknown; Mockup shown in 2022

Infoglobal I-22 Sikatan is an Indonesian 4.5th generation multirole combat aircraft concept by Infoglobal Teknologi Semesta. The aircraft is being designed as a twin-engine, twin-seat light fighter featuring modern avionics and high-performance features, intended to function both as a capable combat platform and as an advanced pilot training platform.

== Name ==
The designation I-22 is derived from the manufacturer, Infoglobal, and it having been unveiled at the 2022 Indo Defence Expo & Forum. The name sikatan is taken from the common name for the species of a genus of Southeast Asian flycatchers.

The name of the I-22 not to be confused with the Polish-made aircraft named PZL I-22 Iryda which also has the name I-22.

== Design ==
The design concept for the I-22 Sikatan was developed by Infoglobal in collaboration with local aerospace design firm Vimana Litbang & Rekayasa, headed by former commercial UAV pilot Sunanto Adjidarmo. At the exhibition, Sunanto described the I-22 Sikatan as a twin-engine fighter aircraft concept with a design inspired by the Saab JAS 39 Gripen. He added that it features a reduced radar cross-section design and uses mostly composite materials to enhance its stealth characteristics with fully Internal Weapons Bay (IWB).

The I-22 Sikatan has compact dimensions with a length of 12.5 meters, a wingspan of 7 meters, and a height of 3.5 meters. This aircraft was deliberately designed with a small size because it will be used as a main fighter aircraft and can be used for long-distance patrols, The sharp lines that extend from the nose to the wing (chine) function to break up turbulence while reducing the Radar Cross Section (RCS), the tilt angle of its vertical fins is designed to throw reflected radar waves sideways, rather than back toward the enemy radar source.

The concept has two variants, one a conventional tailless delta (9.6m wingspan) and the other a canard delta (9m wingspan). A 90% scale mock-up of the canardless variant was put on display at Indo Defence 2022.

== Development ==
The development program will be carried out in three phases. The first phase focuses on developing the aircraft as a training platform. The second phase will serve as a demonstration stage, and the final phase will deliver a fully operational system.

Infoglobal initiated the I-22 Sikatan program with the aim of mastering fighter aircraft technology and targeting market potential by utilizing its experience and skills in system design/production system cost-effective aircraft.

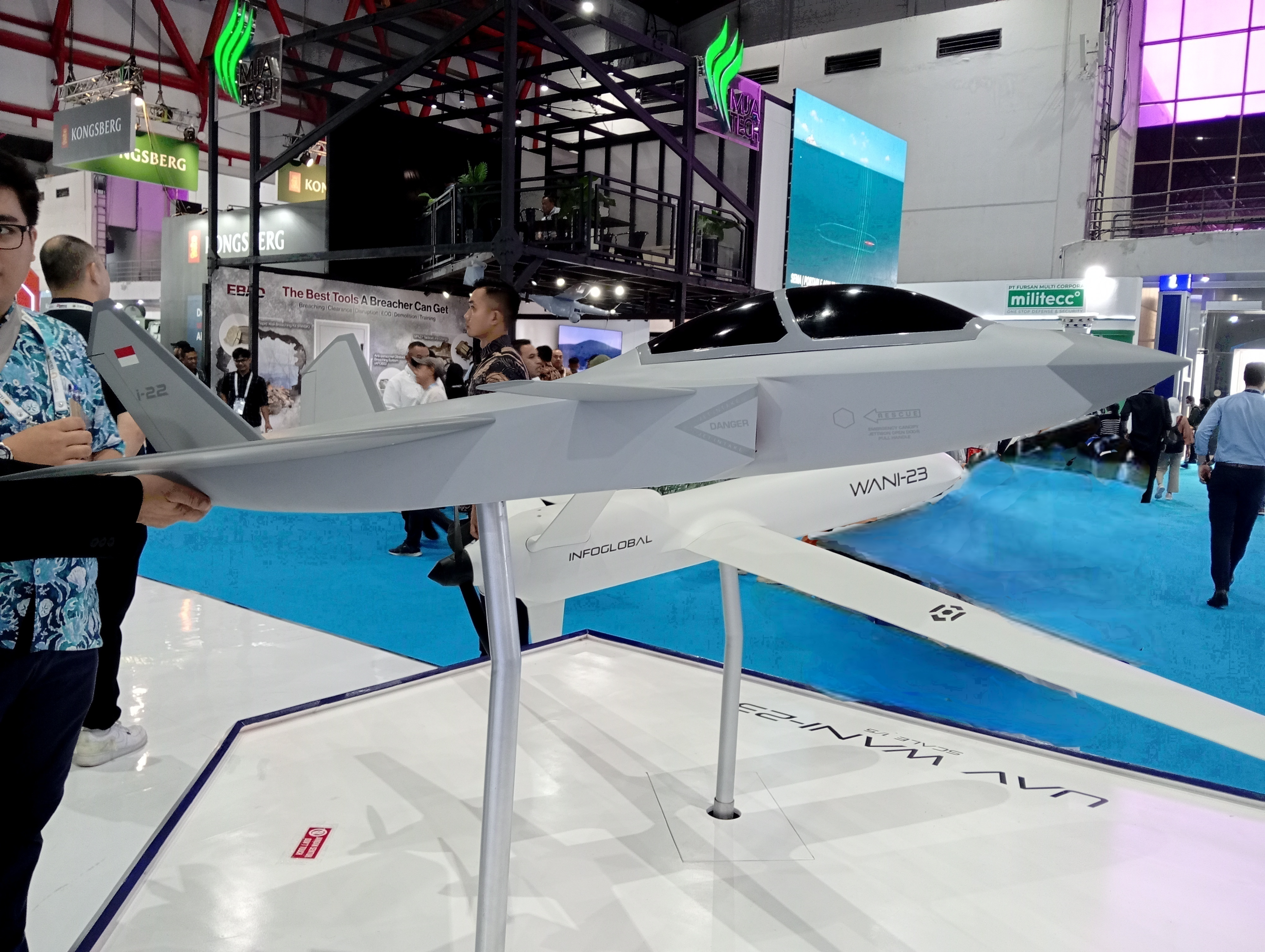
Mockup of the I-22 Sikatan Fighter Jet with Mockup of the Wani-23 Unmanned Aircraft by PT.Infoglobal Teknologi Semesta

At the Indo Defence Expo & Forum held at JIExpo Kemayoran November 2022, the company unveiled the first mockup of the I-22 Sikatan. In Indo Defence 2024 (held 11–14 June 2025), Infoglobal presented further progress, including a full-scale cockpit model and a flight simulator.

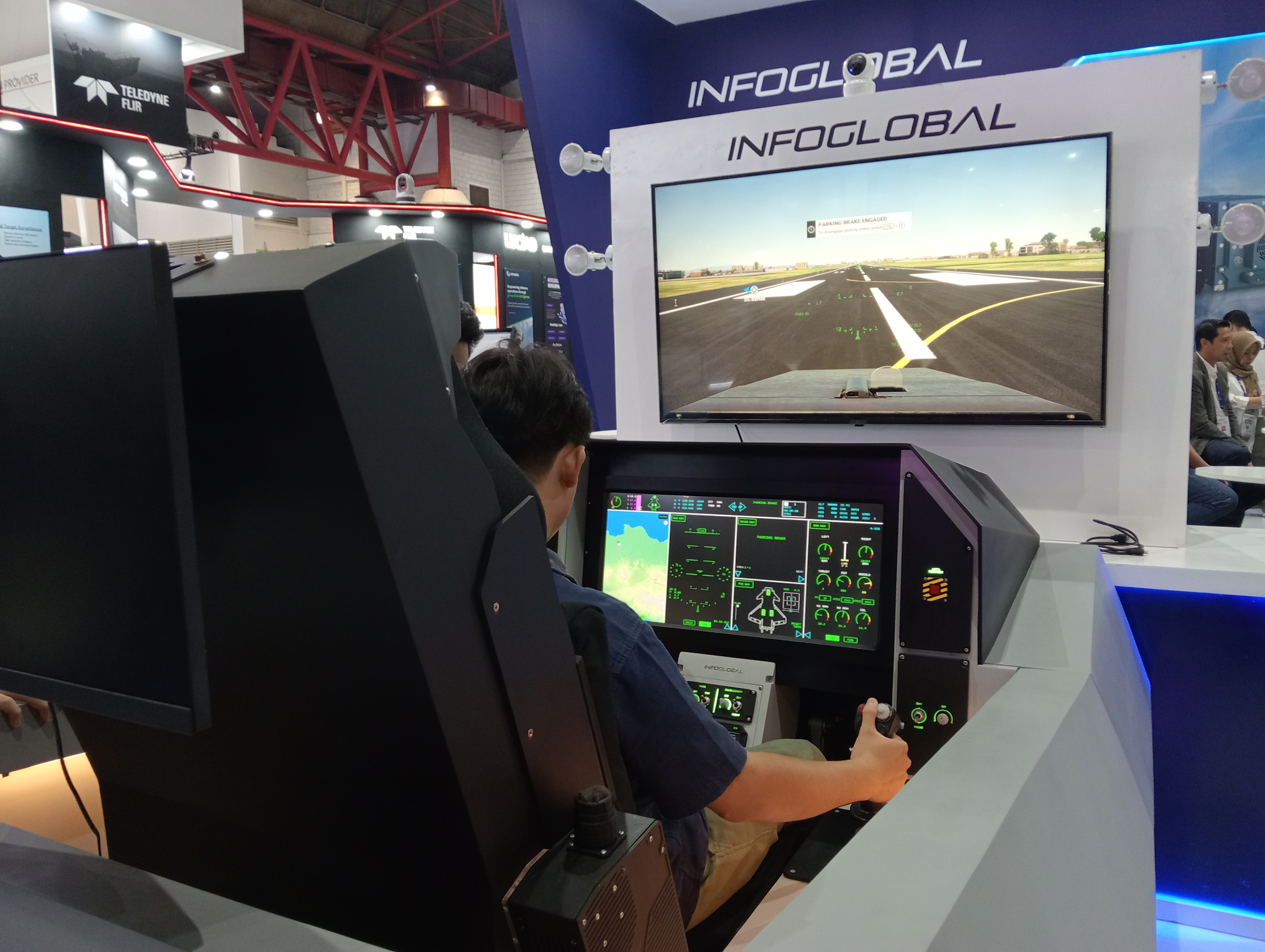
The cockpit and full-scale demonstrator of the I-22 Sikatan fighter aircraft on display at the Indo Defense 2024 exhibition.

The demonstrator showcased advancements such as a modern cockpit with fly-by-wire controls. Most avionics functions are integrated into a single 25-inch panoramic display featuring Communications, Navigation, and Identification (CNI), map-based navigation, engine and fuel monitoring, Integrated Caution and Warning System (ICAWS), and weapon system interfaces. The aircraft also includes a Helmet Mounted Display System (HMDS), an Integrated Electronic Standby Display (IESD), and day/night operational modes. The I-22 is projected to use an AESA Radar and Data Link system that allows this aircraft to fight "silently" without having to turn on an active radar that can be detected by the enemy.

=== Prototype Development in 2026 ===
The development project for the I-22 Sikatan multirole fighter aircraft is planned to enter its prototype construction phase starting in 2026 at Infoglobal's facility located at Ngloram Airport, Blora, Central Java. According to its development roadmap, the prototype is projected to make its maiden flight in 2036.

== Variants (projected) ==
This is planned versions were introduced:

- P0 (Ground Test Article / Structural Test Rig): A non-flying prototype variant built specifically for ground-based structural testing (static and fatigue tests). This prototype is used by Infoglobal to evaluate the strength of the aircraft’s composite airframe materials, the initial integration of avionics systems, and the engine bay architecture, with testing scheduled for 2031.
- P1 (Flight Test Vehicle – Aerodynamics & Propulsion): The first airworthy prototype variant. The primary focus of the P1 variant is to evaluate the aircraft’s aerodynamic characteristics in flight, the performance of the dual-turbofan engine integration (through ground engine runs and flight tests), and the reliability of the quad-redundant fly-by-wire (DFBW) digital control system under actual flight conditions, with testing scheduled for 2036.
- Block I: 4.5-generation aircraft featuring two variants: an advanced jet trainer and a multirole combat aircraft. It incorporates updated avionics tailored for pilot training and air defense capabilities against enemy multirole fighters.
- Block II: 5th-generation air superiority fighter variant, designed with multirole ground-attack capabilities, electronic warfare, and signals intelligence (SIGINT). It features advanced avionics, an internal weapons bay, stealth capabilities, and a potentially enlarged airframe design.

== Specifications of Block I ==
Based on data from the publication.

Infoglobal I-22 Sikatan 3D modelling Block I version

=== General characteristics ===
- Crew: 1 or 2
- Design (Block 1): Initially inspired by the Saab JAS 39 Gripen but bearing greater similarity to the Chengdu J-20; incorporates stealth characteristics with a low radar cross-section and uses composite materials.
- Length: 12.5 m (41 ft 0 in)
- Wingspan: 7 m (23 ft 0 in)
- Height: 3.5 m (11 ft 6 in)
- Gross weight: Unknown (mockup phase)
- Max takeoff weight: Unknown (mockup phase)
- Powerplant: 2 × reverse-engineered turbofans series (Block 1)
- Avionics and flight control system:
  - Block 1: Quad-redundant digital fly-by-wire (DFBW) with flight envelope protection, a 25-inch panoramic display, and a Helmet-Mounted Display System (HMDS) featuring VR/AR integration.
- Radar system: Infoglobal AESA-X (experimental)
- Armament placement:
  - Block 1: Semi-recessed Weapons

=== Performance ===
- Maximum speed: Mach 2.1 (approx. 2,350 km/h; 1,460 mph) for twin-engine configuration (Block 1)
- Combat range: Unknown
- Supercruise: Unknown
- Ferry range: Unknown
- g-limits: Unknown

== Specifications (Block II) ==
Block II design of the Infoglobal I-22 Sikatan rendered in 3D

=== General characteristics ===
- Crew: 1 or 2
- Length: 18 m (59 ft 1 in)
- Wingspan: 13 m (42 ft 8 in)
- Height: 5.3 m (17 ft 5 in)
- Powerplant: 2 × Low-bypass afterburning turbofan engines (variant undetermined)
- Design features: Adopts an aerodynamic configuration combining Chengdu J-20 active canards with an F-22 Raptor stealth layout (diamond wings, twin canted vertical stabilizers). Airframe construction utilizes Advanced Carbon Fiber Reinforced Polymer (CFRP) and Titanium-Matrix Composite (TMC), combined with metamaterial-based Radar-Absorbing Material (RAM) coating. Features sloped caret inlets with serpentine S-ducts and 2D thrust vectoring nozzles (TVN) to minimize infrared signature and radar cross-section (RCS).
- Flight control system: Integrated with a Virtual AI Copilot and manual pilot controls using Advanced Digital DFBW or fly-by-light system, fully integrated with Thrust Vector Control (TVC) and high angle-of-attack (AoA) capabilities.
- Radar system: AESA-X experimental radar.
- Armament bay: Internal weapon bay.

=== Performance ===
- Maximum speed: Mach 2.3 to Mach 2.6 (2,450 to 2,940 km/h; 1,520 to 1,830 mph) with twin engines and 2D thrust vectoring nozzles.
- Combat range: Unknown
- Supercruise: Unknown
- Ferry range: Unknown
- g-limits: Unknown

== See also ==
=== Indonesian fighter aircraft design ===
- LAPAN Fighter Experimental (LFX)

=== Other ===
- KAI KF-21 Boramae
- Chengdu J-20
- F-35 Lightning II
- Saab JAS 39 Gripen
- Indo Defence Expo & Forum
