= DS-240 Arjuna =

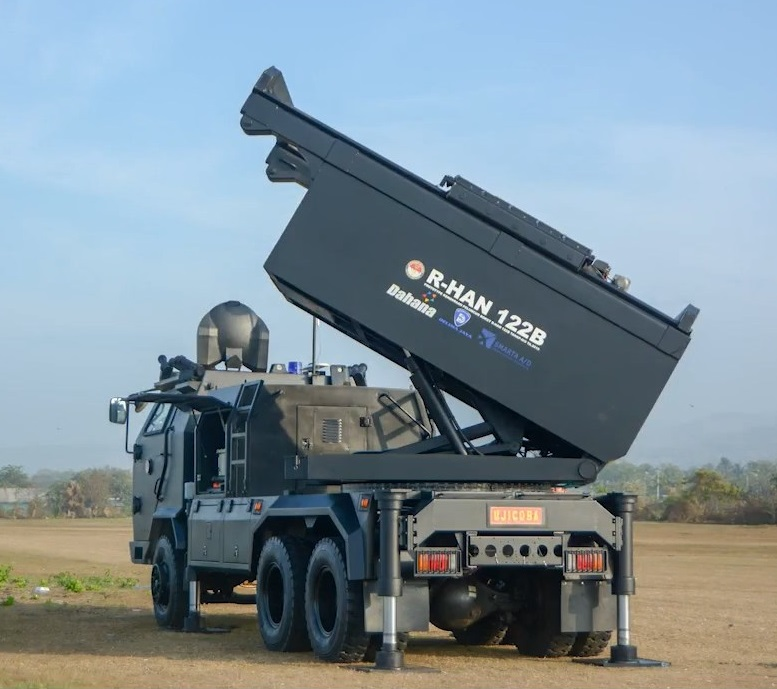
- Prototype of R-Han 122 rocket-launching vehicle by PT Delimajaya Group
- Type: Rocket artillery/MLRS
- Place of origin: Indonesia

Service history
- In service: not yet
- Used by: Indonesia

Production history
- Designer: LAPAN, Indonesian Aerospace
- Designed: 2005–2023
- Manufacturer: Indonesian Aerospace
- Variants: R-han 122A, R-Han 122B, R-Han 122 Avibras

Specifications
- Mass: 59.6 kg (131 lb) (R-Han 122A), 64 kg (141 lb) (R-Han 122B)
- Length: 2.82 m (9 ft 3 in)
- Caliber: 122 mm
- Barrels: 2 x 40 Cell Rockets
- Muzzle velocity: Mach 1.8 (0.61 km/s; 0.38 mi/s) (R-Han 122A), Mach 2.95 (1.00 km/s; 0.62 mi/s) (R-Han 122B)
- Effective firing range: 24 km (15 mi) (R-Han 122A), 27 km (17 mi) (R-Han 122B), 32 km (20 mi) (R-han 122 Avibras)
- Payload capacity: 18 kg (40 lb) warhead

DS-240 Arjuna is a family of rocket artillery developed by PT Dirgantara Indonesia (PT DI) of Indonesia with maximum speed Mach 2.95 (3,614 km/h; 2,246 mph) and maximum range of 32 km (20 mi). It is used primarily by the Indonesian military.

== History ==
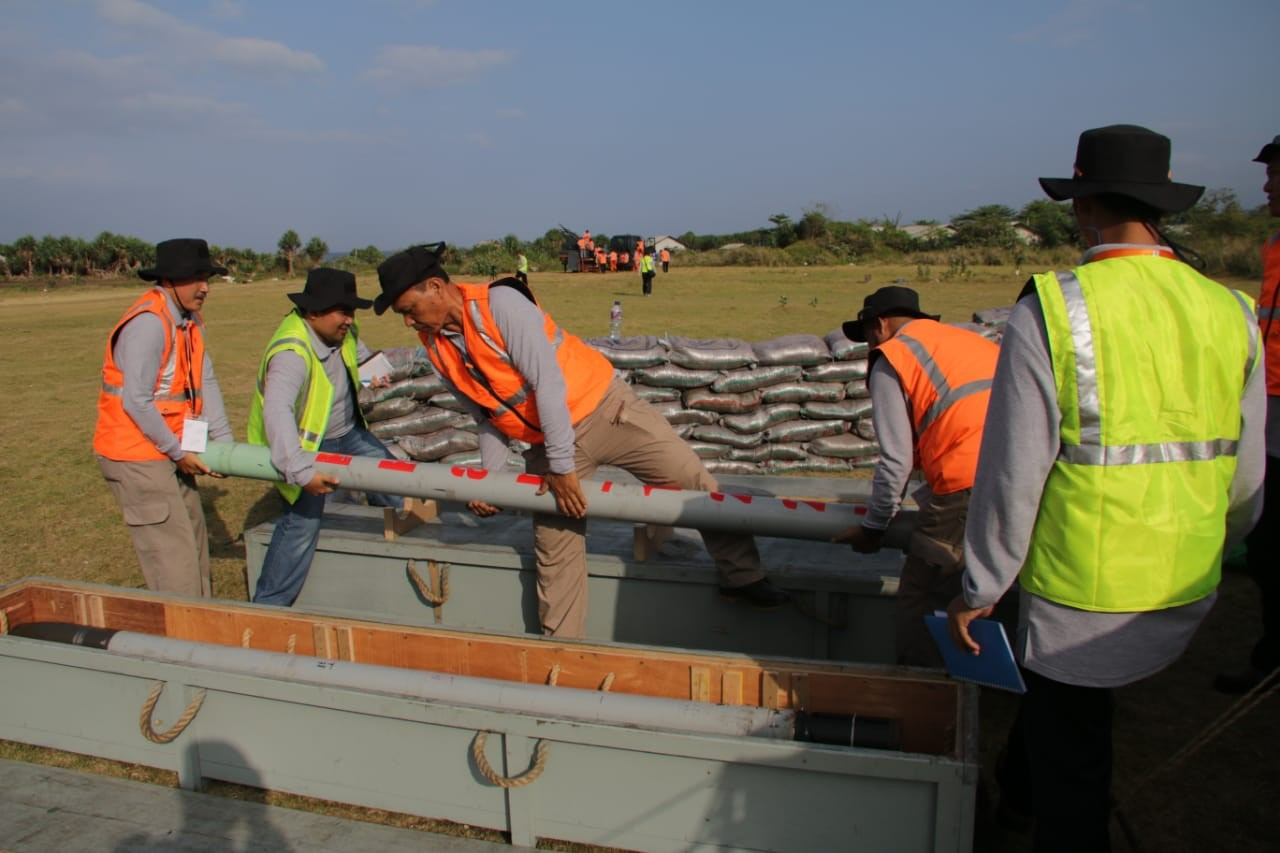
R-han 122B rocket tested at Garut, West Java, 23 to 25 October 2018

The R-Han 122 was made by PT Dirgantara Indonesia (PT DI or IAe), Ministry of Research and Technology, Ministry of Defence, PT Dahana, and Pindad and in conjunction with the Indonesian Army. It started in 2007 when the Ministry of Research and Technology formed the D-230 Team to develop a 122 mm diameter rocket with a range of 20 km (12 mi). The D-230 rocket prototype was purchased by the Ministry of Defense and Security to strengthen the thousand rocket program. The government formed the National Rocket Consortium with the head of the consortium PT DI, as a forum for entering the mass business that has existed since 2005. However, the D-230 rocket was only developed in 2007 until the consortium was formed.

In the consortium, PT Pindad has developed the launch and firing system using the GAZ, Nissan, and Perkasa platforms which have been modified with 16 warhead barrels and a mobile launcher. PT Dahana also provided propellants, PT Krakatau Steel developed tube materials and rocket structures. PT Dirgantara Indonesia designs and tests flight distances. Another supporter in the consortium is the Meteorology, Climatology, and Geophysical Agency (BMKG), which also provides a tool to determine the position of the rocket's fall. ITB provides a wireless camera system to capture and send images when a rocket arrives at its target. Various universities, namely UGM, ITS, Ahmad Dahlan University, and Suryadharma University, were also involved. The name D-230 was later changed to R-Han 122 after the design was purchased by the Ministry of Defense.

The researchers conducted several trials to perfect the thermal insulation system for the rocket. In 2003, the researchers used a critical material with a steel thickness of 1.2 mm (0.047 in), but the product broke down quickly. When the rocket launches perfectly it takes a temperature of 3,000 °C (5,430 °F), and a failure of the insulation system can prove fatal to the operators of the device. Therefore, the thermal insulation room is given rubber or polymer which can isolate heat. For rocket material, a lightweight material, aluminum, is chosen, because it can isolate heat. These changes turned out to produce a rocket that was never damaged when tested.

On 6 November 2010, a firing test was conducted in Baturaja, South Sumatra. The rockets tested are 3 122 mm rockets with smoke warhead and 1 with a live warhead. Another test was conducted on 28 March 2012, firing 50 rockets from GAZ launcher developed by Pindad. The rockets have a range of 15 km (9.3 mi) and a speed of Mach 1.8 (2,205 km/h; 1,370 mph).

The R-Han 122 was publicly unveiled to visitors at the Indodefence 2014 convention from November 5 to 8, 2014 after missile tests were conducted in March 2014.

The R-Han 122B rocket program began in 2014 using APBN funds and it underwent the first dynamic test in June 2015 as the implementation of the Consortium in 2014. On 20 August 2015, the second dynamic test was carried out, firing 6 rockets with an Indonesian Marine Corps' RM 70 MLRS. The R-Han 122B underwent a third dynamic test on January 27 to 29, 2016 at Tempursari Beach Lumajang, East Java with visitors from the Indonesian Ministry of Defense and various Indonesian defense companies. This dynamic test is ground to ground using several types of warhead loads, namely 4 inert or dummy units, 9 smoke units, 8 sharp units, and 4 telemetry units. Dummy loads and smoke are launched to see the dropping point, sharp payloads are launched as a simulation of the real condition of the R-Han 122-B rocket, and telemetry payloads are used to determine the rocket trajectory. From the test results, the area where the rocket fell was successfully monitored by the observer to be in the range of 22–23 km (14–14 mi) for an elevation angle of 30° and a range of 25–26 km (16–16 mi) for an elevation angle of 50°.
