= Ohannes Kurkdjian =

Armenian photographer

Ohannes (Onnes) Kurkdjian
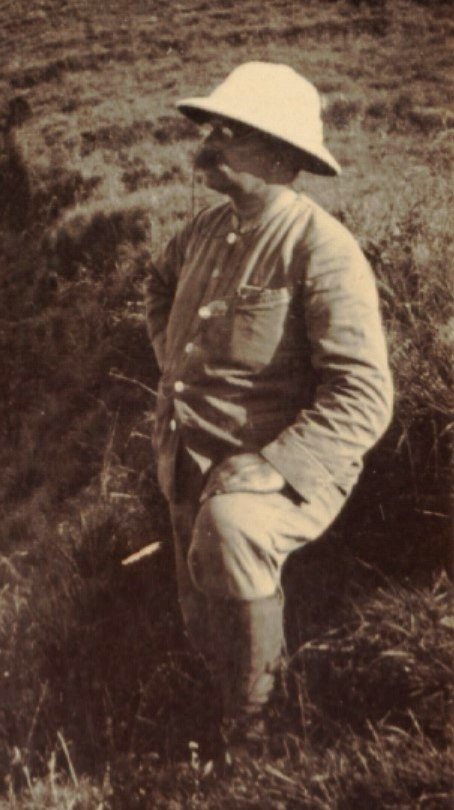
- Kurkdjian on the edge of the Sand Sea (Lautan Pasir) in the Tengger Mountains (c. 1910)
- Born: 1851; Gürün, Ottoman Empire
- Died: 1903 (aged 51–52); Surabaya, Dutch East Indies
- Known for: Photography

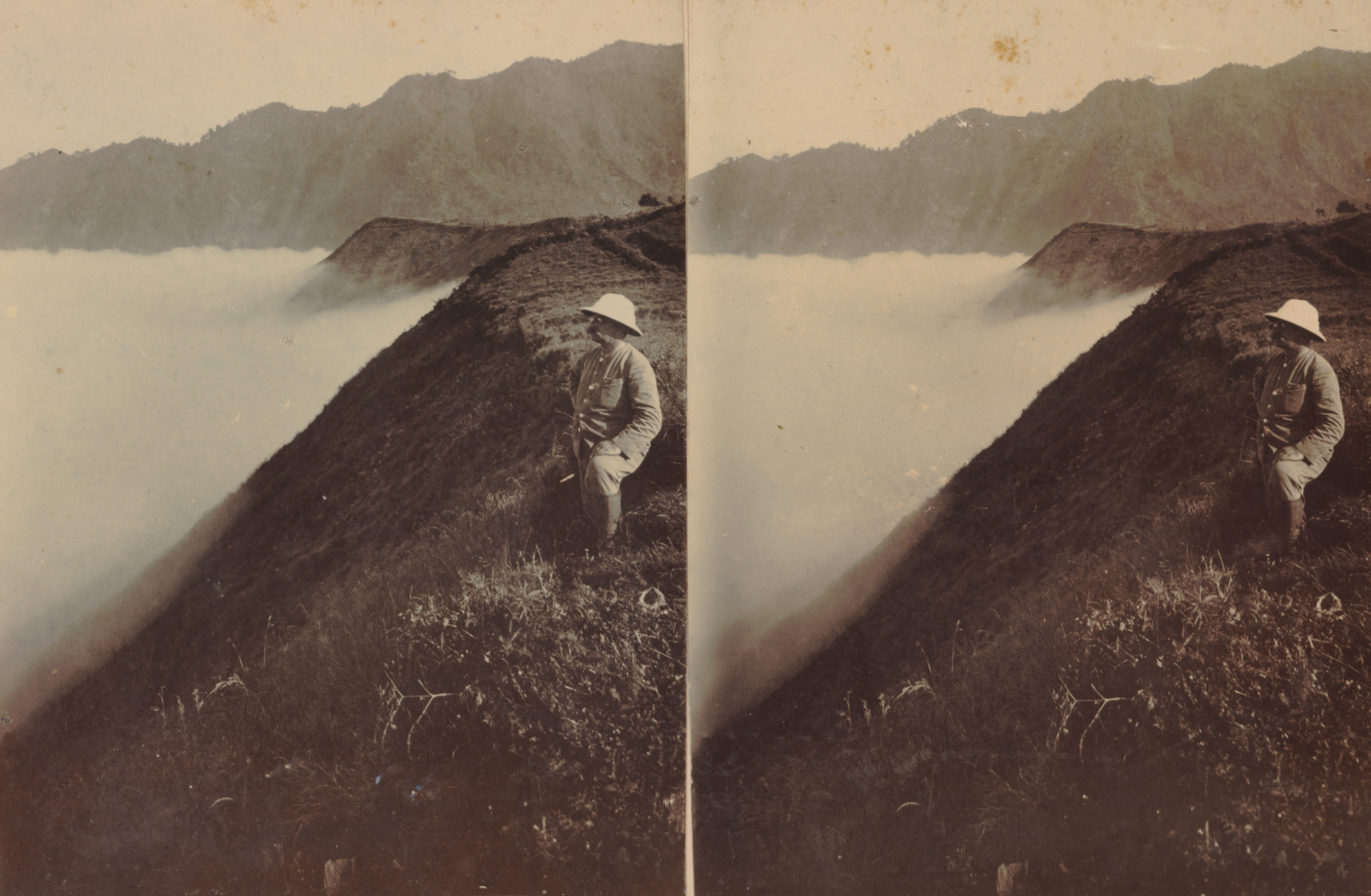
Ohannes Kurkdjian on the edge of the Sand Sea (Lautan Pasir) in the Tengger Mountains – circa 1910. Stereophotograph.

Ohannes Kurkdjian (first name sometimes spelled Onnes, Armenian spelling Hovhannes, 1851–1903) was a photographer based in Yerevan, Tiflis, Singapore and then Surabaya during the Dutch East Indies era.

His namesake business (located at Bultzingslowenplein) was the studio Kurkdjian Atelier and later O. Kurkdjian & Co.

== Life and work ==
Kurkdjian was born in 1851 in Kyurin (Gürun), a town in the Armenian region that was then part of the Ottoman Empire. He studied photography in Vienna, Austria, in 1870, before moving to Tiflis, Georgia.

During the Russo-Turkish War of 1878, Kurkdjian worked as a photographer for the Russian Army. Afterwards, he settled in Yerevan, Armenia, and gained recognition from the European photography community for his work. In 1879, over the course of five months, he explored and photographed the ancient monuments in Ani, the former capital of ancient Armenia. From this expedition, he published an album titled "Ruins of Armenia" in Armenian and French. This publication became part of his contribution to the Armenian independence movement against the Russian Tsarist regime during the 1878–1882 period.

Due to his involvement in political activities, Kurkdjian was forced to flee to Vienna in 1881. Pressure from the Tsarist regime also drove many Armenians to leave their homeland, some heading to East and Southeast Asia. In 1885, Kurkdjian moved to Singapore, worked for two months at a local photography studio, and eventually settled in Java in 1886. He established his own studio in Surabaya in 1890, called "Kurkdjian Atelier", located at Bultzingslowenplein (now the area between Jalan Pahlawan and Jalan Kramat Gantung, Alun-Alun Contong subdistrict, Bubutan district, Surabaya city).

The studio produced a variety of works, ranging from portraits of figures such as Pakubuwana X & Susuhunan of Solo, to photographs of landscapes, buildings, business activities, and trade. Kurkdjian earned income from commissions and royalties on photo albums published for promotional purposes. Many of his works were also printed as postcards.

In 1897, George P. Lewis, a British national, joined as his assistant.

Kurkdjian documented Queen Wilhelmina’s visit to the island of Java on 31 August 1898 and published it in the "Queen’s Album". On 6 June 1901, he was invited by the Dutch government to photograph the massive eruption of Mount Kelud, which had been ongoing since 23 May. The eruption caused severe damage in Kediri and Blitar, with an estimated death toll in the thousands. During the documentation process, Lewis took one of the most well-known portraits of Kurkdjian—of him standing with his back to the camera, facing the crater left by Mount Kelud’s eruption.

These eruption photographs were exhibited to the public and received much acclaim. However, amid the praise for his work, the world was shocked by the news of his sudden death in 1903. He was buried at Peneleh Cemetery, a European cemetery complex in Surabaya.

After Kurkdjian’s death, his studio was continued by Lewis and renamed "O Kurkdjian and Co". In 1915, the studio was acquired by the pharmaceutical company Mieling & Co. Since his passing, the studio's focus shifted solely to portrait photography, no longer covering landscapes and other visual documentation. This studio employed at least 30 people, including Thilly Weissenborn, the first prominent female photographer born in Indonesia.

== Gallery ==
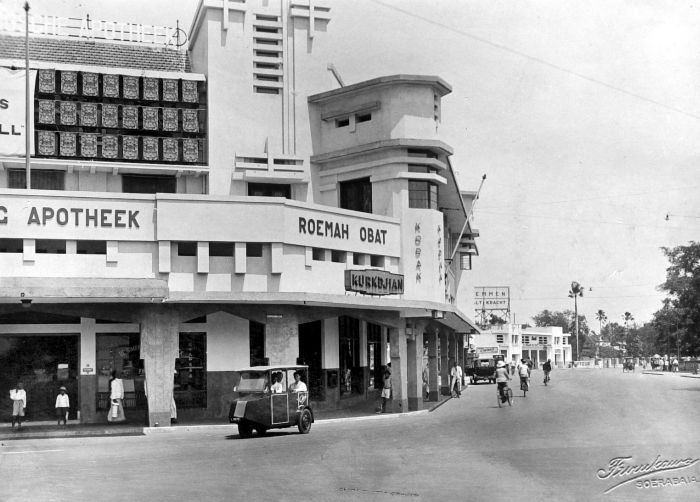
Kurkdjian studio in Surabaya in a building with other businesses

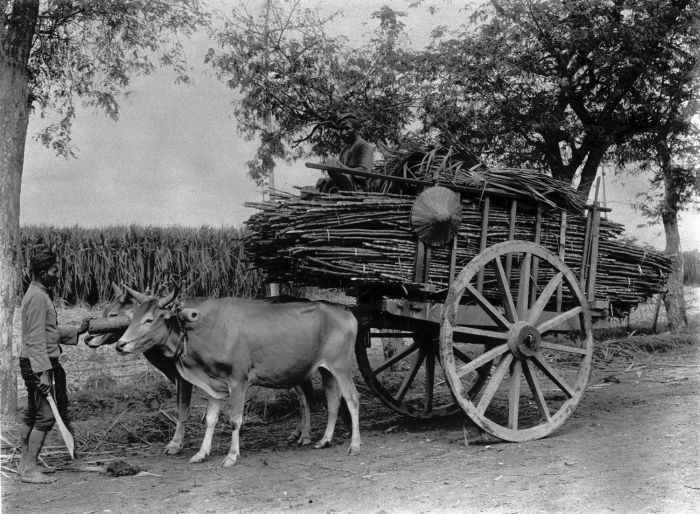
Sugarcane being transported by oxcart

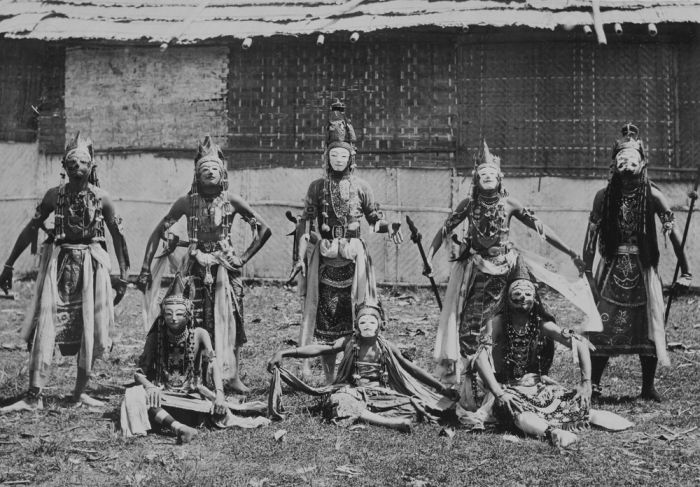
Wayang wong performers

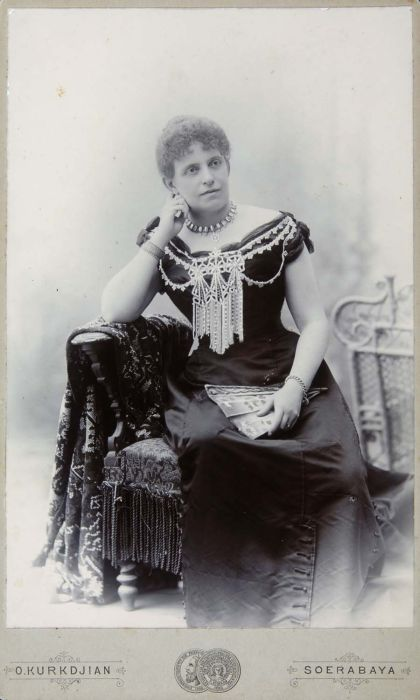
Studio portrait of a woman

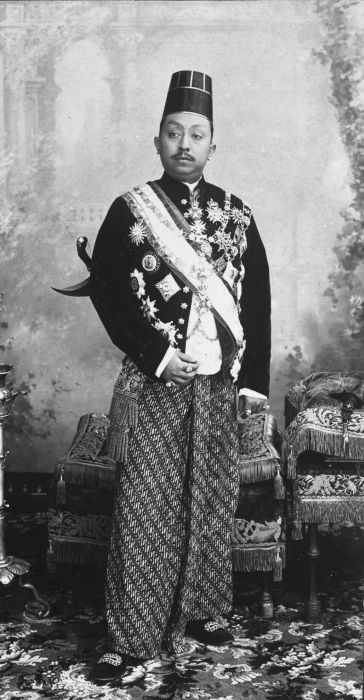
Pakoe Boewono X Susuhunan van Solo

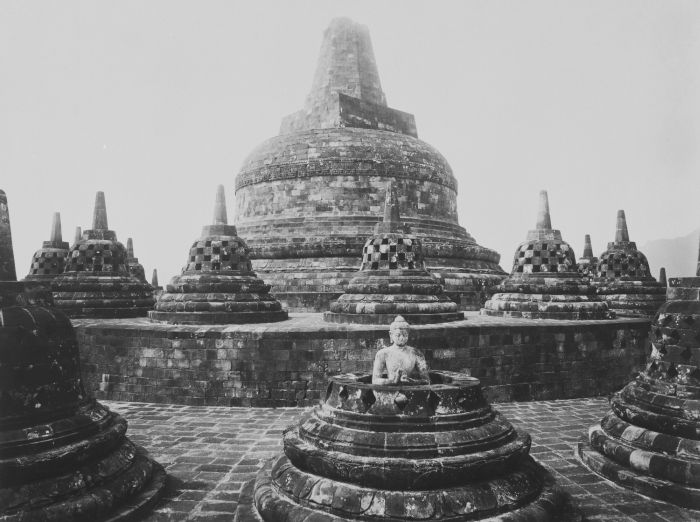
Borobudur

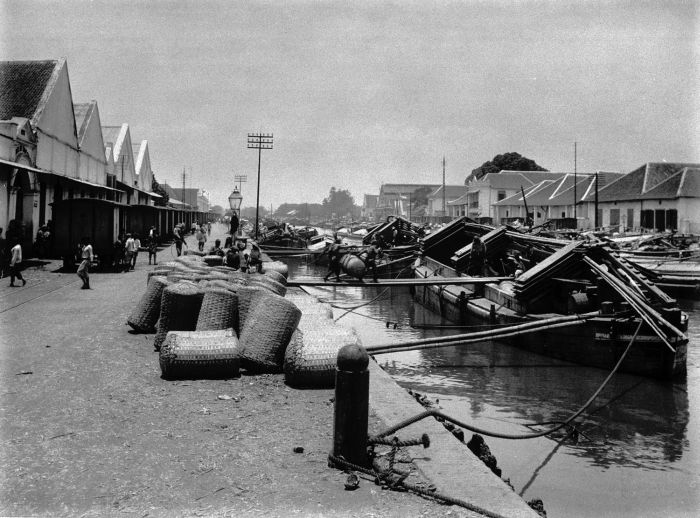
Bales being shipped from the sugarcane factory

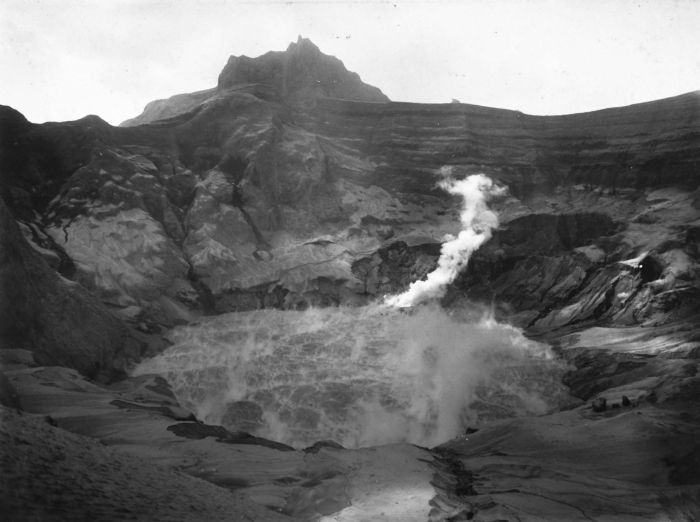
Mount Kelud crater circa 1901

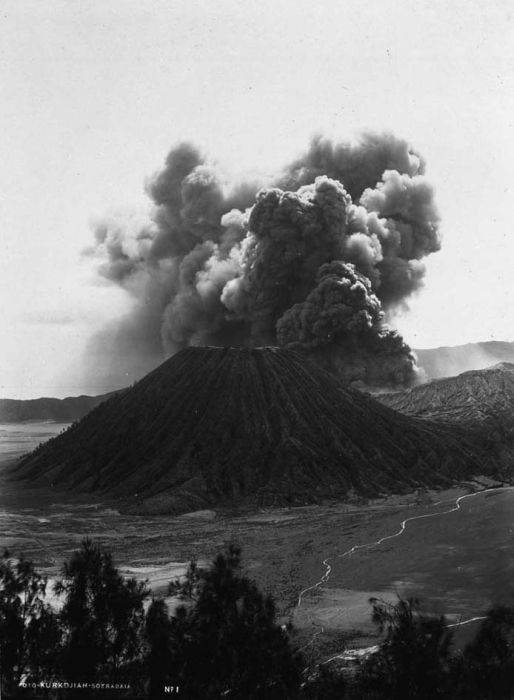
Mount Bromo circa 1920

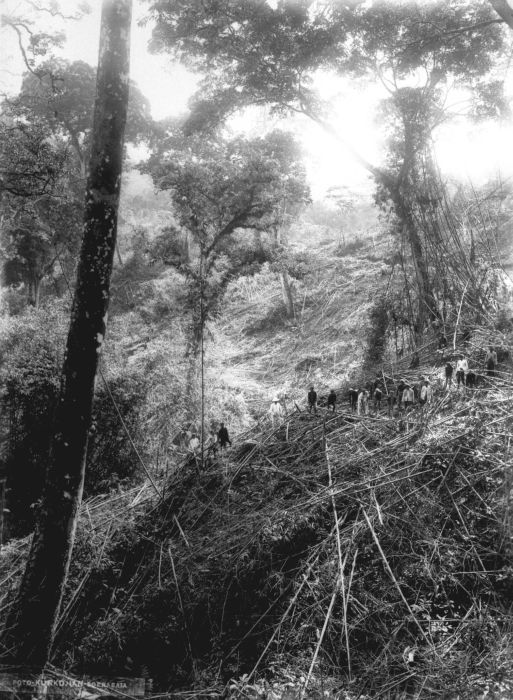
Hillside with people photograph

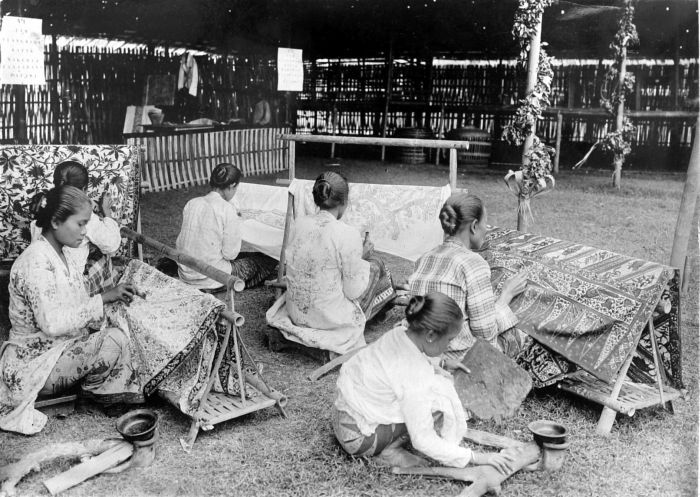
Women doing batik

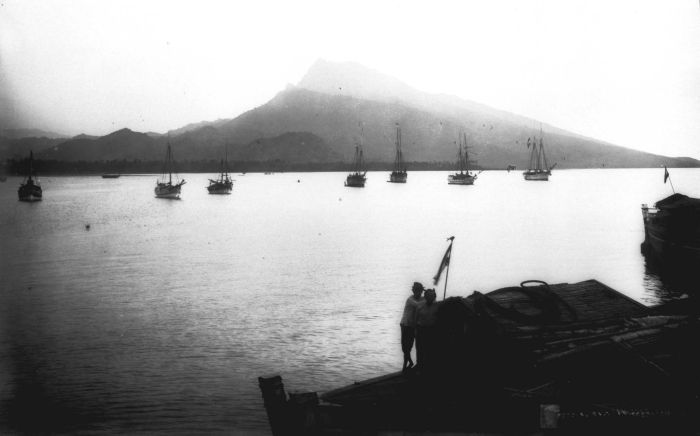
Boats anchored at Tjilatjap (Cilacap)

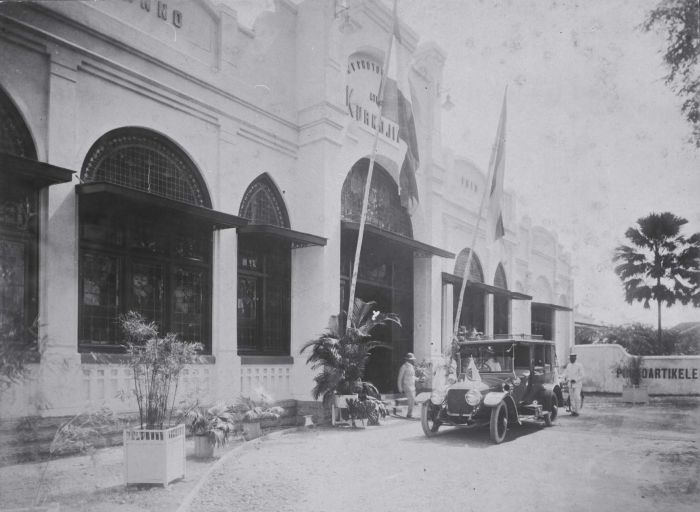
Outside the Kurkdjian photo studio

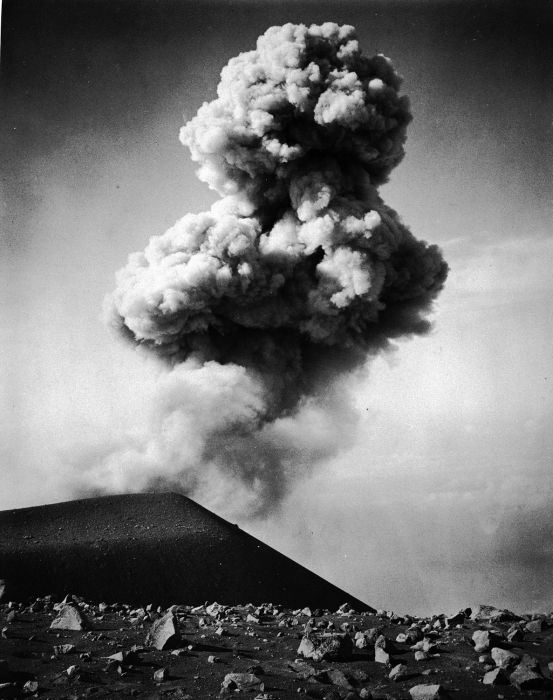
Semeroe volcano in 1897

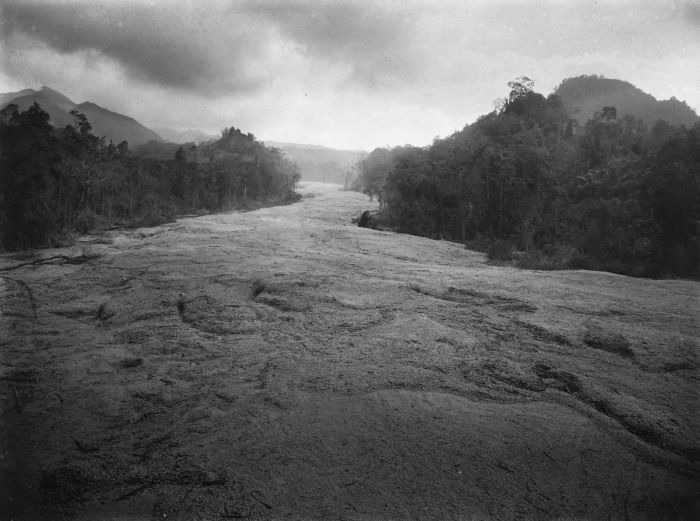
A sixteen meter deep mudslide at Redjosari after the eruption of the Kelud volcano

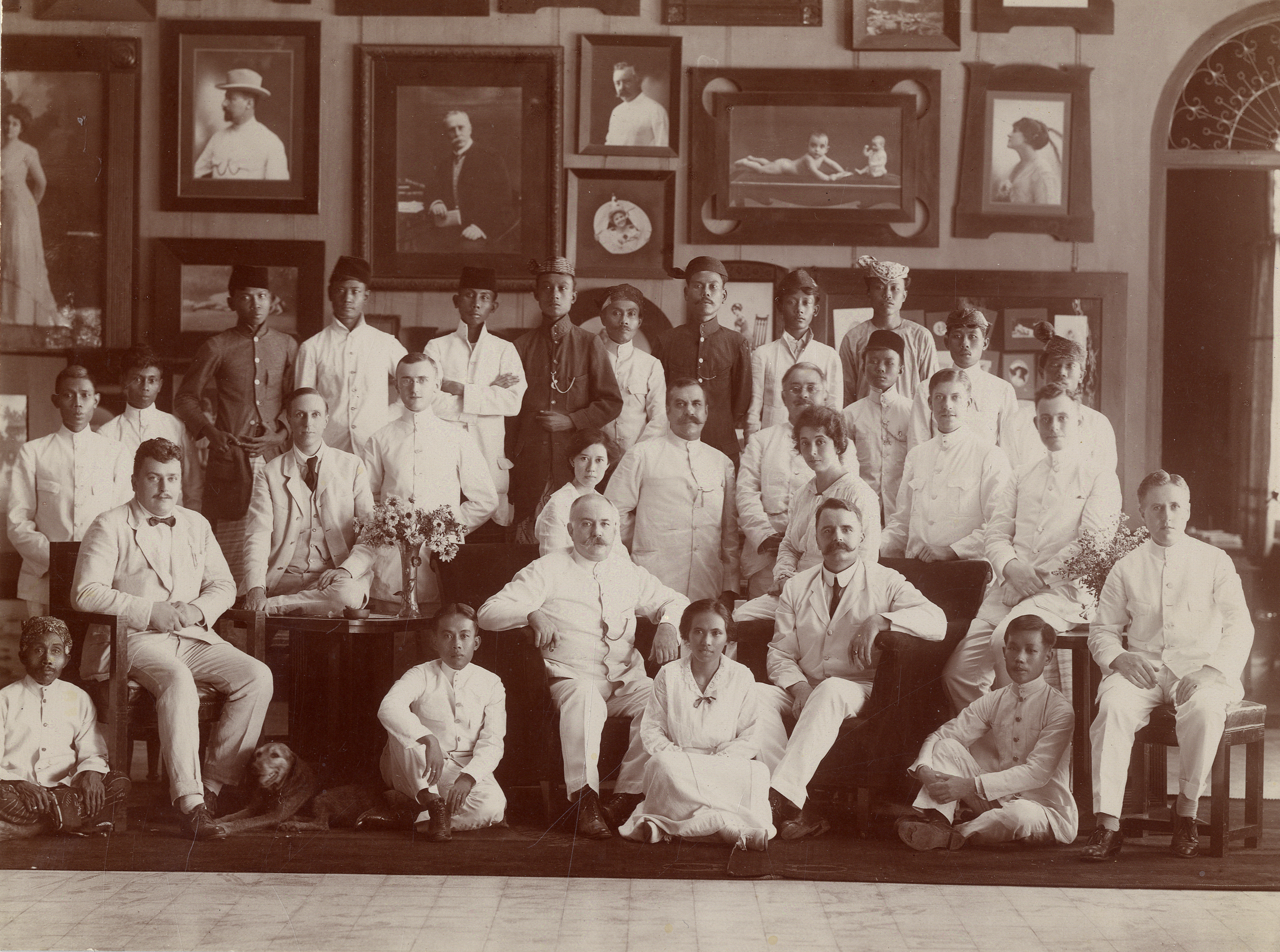
Personnel of Atelier Kurkdjian, Surabaya, 1916
