= Thilly Weissenborn =

Dutch photographer

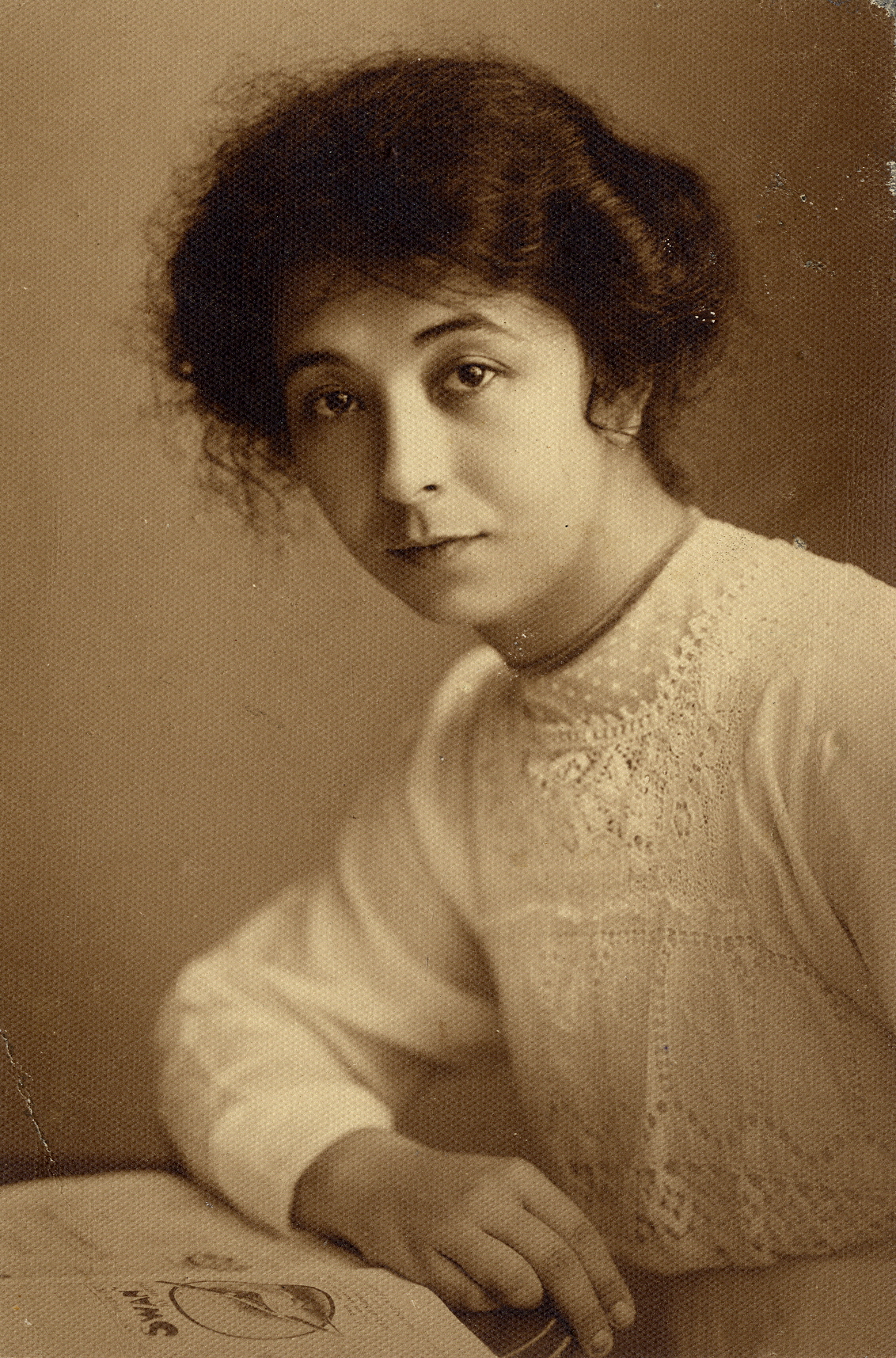
- at Surabaya - 1916
- Born: Margarethe Mathilde Weissenborn; 22 March 1883; Dutch East Indies (now Indonesia)
- Died: 28 October 1964 (aged 81); Baarn, Utrecht Province, The Netherlands
- Other name: Thilly Weissenborn-Wijnmalen
- Occupation: photographer
- Years active: 1903-1956
- Spouse: Nico Wijnmalen

Thilly Weissenborn (1883 – 1964) was the first professional female photographer of the former Dutch East Indies and one of the few early 20th-century photographers in the region who were Indonesian-born. Her works were widely used to expand the newly developed tourism industry of the East Indies.

== Early life ==
Margarethe Mathilde Weissenborn was born either on 22 March 1883 or 1889, to Cornelia Emma Angely Lina da Paula (née Roessner) and Hermann Theodor Weissenborn in either Surabaya, or Kediri, on East Java of the Dutch East Indies (now Indonesia). (Note: According to a daughter of her sister Maria da Paula, Thilly received a marriage proposal from widower Nico Wijnmalen after World War II—which they had survived in each other's company—when she was almost 60 years old. This same niece gives Kediri, 22 March 1889 as her place and date of birth.) Her parents were German-born, naturalized Dutch citizens and operated a coffee plantation in Kediri. In 1892, her mother returned with Thilly and her siblings to the Netherlands and took up residence in The Hague. They were joined by their father the following year. After five years, the oldest son and the father left for Tanganyika in German East Africa to become planters there. Else, one of Thilly's older sisters, who had studied photography in Paris, opened a photographic studio in The Hague in 1903, where Thilly began working. In 1912, she left the Netherlands and returned to Java, in the company of her brother Theo to join their brother Oscar, who was living in Bandung.

== Career ==
In 1912, Weissenborn returned to Java and on 15 June 1912 established a photographic studio in Bandung with Grete Weustmann in what was the first professional photographic studio in Indonesia to be owned and operated by women. Weissenborn and Weustmann were still operating their photographic studio in Bandung on 24 September 1914. Either late in 1914 or early in 1915, Weissenborn found employment in a prestigious photographic studio in Surabaya which was founded by Onnes Kurkdjian, an Armenian, called Atelier Kurkdjian. The studio was the only agent for Kodak in East Java. Kurkdjian had died by the time Weissenborn arrived and the studio, which employed thirty photographers, was managed by an Englishman, GP Lewis. Weissenborn honed her craft under Lewis' tutelage learning both photographic and retouching techniques. In 1917, she moved to Garut in West Java and managed a photographic studio GAH Lux in the Garoetsche Apotheek en Handelsvereeniging Company, a pharmacy owned by Denis G. Mulder. Mulder moved to Bandung in 1920 and turned over his property to Weissenborn, who changed the firm name to Foto Lux. In 1930, she established Lux Fotograaf Atelier NV, which she operated for a decade in Garut.

Weissenborn became the first significant woman photographer in Indonesia and was one of the few photographers working in the era who were Indonesian-born. Her works were marked by a lyrical quality and her attempt to capture the idyllic nature of the landscape. She is most known for her photographs of architectural interiors, landscapes, and portraits, which were produced for the burgeoning tourist industry. Some of her works were featured in Dutch tourism guide published in 1922, as Come to Java. Her photographs also made up the majority of the images in Louis Couperus' work Oostwaarts (Eastward, 1923). Weissenborn traveled throughout the East Indies, and particularly worked in Bali, trying to capture the exotic nature of the islands, while at the same time, retaining the dignity of locals she photographed. Ironically, her images were at times appropriated and used in prurient manners, such as a photograph of two women on a road carrying water, one who has a pot on her head, which was used for a French novel titled L'Île des seins nus (Island of Bare Breasts). In time, her portrait images changed from partially-clad images to the more artistic images of dancing girls. These were featured in such magazines as Inter-Ocean, Sluyter’s Monthly and Tropical Netherlands, which marketed a more civilized Bali to international tourists.

== Later life ==
During World War II, the 16th Army of Japan landed in West Java at the end of February, 1942. After subduing the population, around 30,000 American, Australian, British, Dutch, and Indo-European civilians were transported to civilian internment camps. In 1943, Weissenborn was interned in the Japanese prisoner of war camp Kareës in Bandung. Women and children were kept in the camp until 1945. The town of Garut was destroyed by fire and then in the aftermath of the Indonesian National Revolution, Weissenborn's studio was completely destroyed and all her glass negatives were lost in 1947. That same year, she married Nico Wijnmalen and the couple moved to Bandung.

In 1956, the Indonesian government repudiated the remaining terms of the Hague Round Table Conference forcing Weissenborn and Wijnmalen to return to Holland. Weissenborn died 28 October 1964 at Baarn, in Utrecht Province, The Netherlands and is buried in the Baarn New General Cemetery.

== Legacy ==
Her family donated an album of her work to the permanent collection of the Tropenmuseum in Amsterdam and her works have been featured in the National Gallery of Australia. A collection of her works was published in 1983, by her nephew Ernst Drissen called Vastgelegd voor Later. Indische Foto's (1917-1942) van Thilly Weissenborn (Retrospective. East Indian Pictures (1917-1942) of Thilly Weissenborn) in Amsterdam. The Royal Netherlands Institute of Southeast Asian and Caribbean Studies (KITLV) has digitized and made some of her works available in an on-line collection.
