= RX (rocket family) =

Indonesian rocket family

- Designer: National Institute of Aeronautics and Space
- Country of origin: Indonesia

Specifications
- Spacecraft type: Solid-fuel rockets

Capacity

Payload to {{{to}}}

Production
- Status: Under development

The RX rocket family (Roket Eksperimental, English: Experimental Rocket) is a series of solid-fuel rockets developed by the Indonesian National Institute of Aeronautics and Space (LAPAN).

They are simply named by their diameter in millimeters; for example, the RX-250 has a diameter of 250 millimeters (9.8 in). The propellant used is HTPB-based composite propellant.

== Individual boosters ==
This family is composed of:

Version	Diameter (mm)	Length (m)	Thrust (kN)	Burn time (s)	Specific impulse (s)	Propellant mass (kg)	Total mass (kg)	Payload (kg)	Flights	Years active	Apogee reached (km)	Range reached (km)
RX-75	75											
RX-100	100	1.90		2.5			30				7	11
RX-1220	122		19.6							2015-2019		25
RX-150	150											
RX-250	250	5.30	53	6.0	220		300	30–60	8	1987–2007	70–100	
RX-320	320	4.74	52	9.0	220	371	532		3	2008–2014	40–42	
RX-420	420		94	12.3	220	425			1	2009	43	90
RX-450	450	7.11	126	19.5	230	757-765	1718		5	2015-2020	44-84	129
RX-550	550		255	14	240	1519				2010	300	533
RX-750	750										1,000	2,000
RX-980	980										3,000km (Estimation)	4,000km (Estimation)

Note: Characteristics in italics are design values, they have not been measured yet.

RX-250 was launched eight times from 1987 to 2007. RX-320 was launched twice in 2008 and once again in 2014. RX-420 flew just once in 2009; it is superseded by RX-450 which was launched on 13 May 2015.

As of May 2016, the next booster version RX-550 is under construction; the larger ones are only on the drawing board. RX-550 has a speed of Mach 7.62 which makes it fall into the hypersonic category

In 2017 successful launches of RX 450 and RX 1220 were carried out from the Space and Atmospheric Observation & Technology Testing Center at Garut, West Java. The RX 1220 is a based on the R-HAN122 B.

Two RX-1220 rockets were launched at the Karang Papak Air Force Base on December 23, 2018.

RX (Roket Eksperimental) gallery

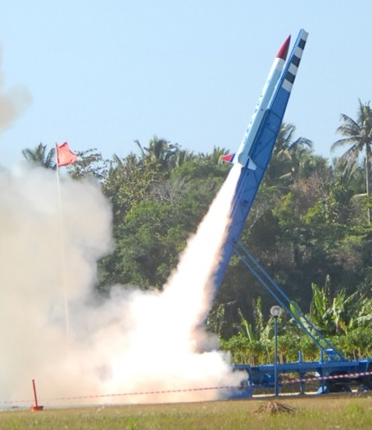
RX-320

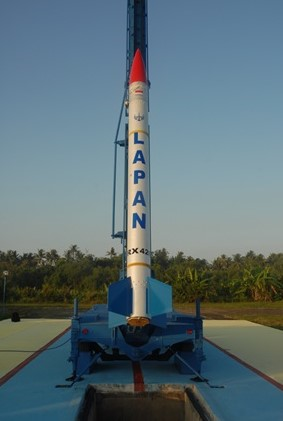
RX-420

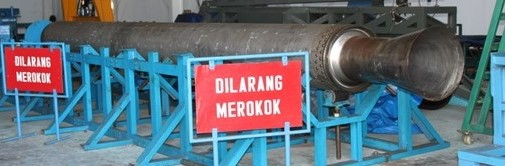
RX-550

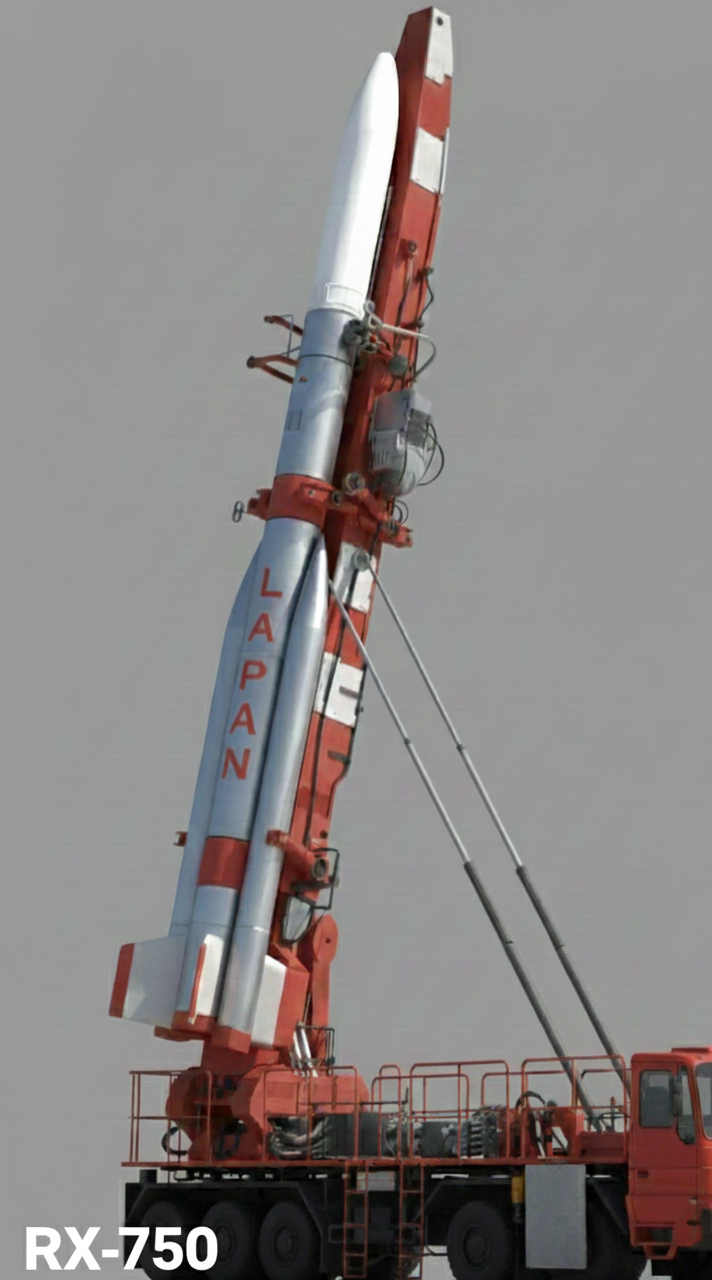
RX-750 (3D Modelling)

== Multi-stage rockets ==
Once the solid boosters are fully qualified, LAPAN plans to assemble several of them into multi-stage rockets called Roket Pengorbit Satelit or RPS. Four staging configurations have been retained so far:

- RPS-01 Variant 1 (ex-RPS-420)

- First stage: 3 x RX-420
- Second stage: 1 x RX-420
- Third stage: 1 x RX-420 (shorter)
- Fourth stage: 1 x RX-320
- Total height: 10.00 meters (32.81 ft)

- RPS-01 Variant 2b

- First stage: 1 x RX-550 + 2 x RX-420
- Second stage: 1 x RX-550
- Third stage: 1 x RX-320
- Total height: 15.75 meters (51.7 ft)

- RPS-01 Variant 3a

- First stage: 1 x RX-450
- Second stage: 1 x RX-450
- Total height: 10.75 meters (35.3 ft)

- RPS-01 Variant 3b

- First stage: 1 x RX-450 + 2 x RX-320
- Second stage: 1 x RX-450
- Third stage: 1 x RX-320
- Total height: 11.75 meters (38.5 ft)

Earlier plans for the Pengorbitan-1 and -2 orbital launch vehicles (RPS-420s) were based on the RX-420 engine which was superseded by the RX-450. As of May 2016, integration work is proceeding on variants 3a and 3b, whose engines have all been successfully flight-qualified. RX-320 planned as Anti-aircraft system

Since 2019, LAPAN's rocket division PUSTEKROKET has collaborated with AASPT and CGWIC of China in designing newer multiple stage sounding rockets. The new rockets will be called RX-452 which combined 400 millimeters (16 in) of first stage, and 450 millimeters (18 in) of second stage. The design is based on TK-32 sounding rocket as well as RX-450. It is expected the newer design to be able to reach above 100 kilometers (62 mi), simulation showed the rocket is able to reach 200 kilometers (120 mi).

- RX-452

- First stage: 1 x RX-400
- Second stage: 1 x RX-450
- Total height: 8.6 meters (28 ft)

== Military variant ==
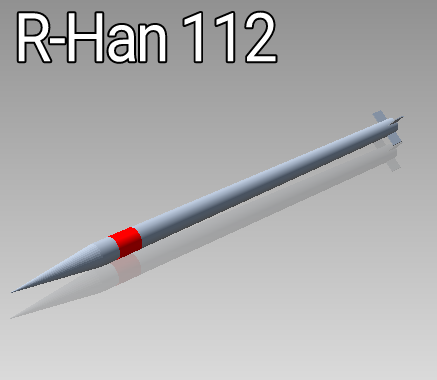
3D Modelling of R-Han 112B missile

- R-Han 122: MLRS/Artillery rocket variant
- R-Han 450: Rocket artillery variant
- R-Han 550: Short-range ballistic missile variant
- R-Han 750: Medium-range ballistic missile variant
- R-Han 980: Medium-range ballistic missile

== See also ==
- Indonesia and weapons of mass destruction
