= Pameungpeuk =

Pameungpeuk Kecamatan Pameungpeuk
- Town
- Pameungpeuk
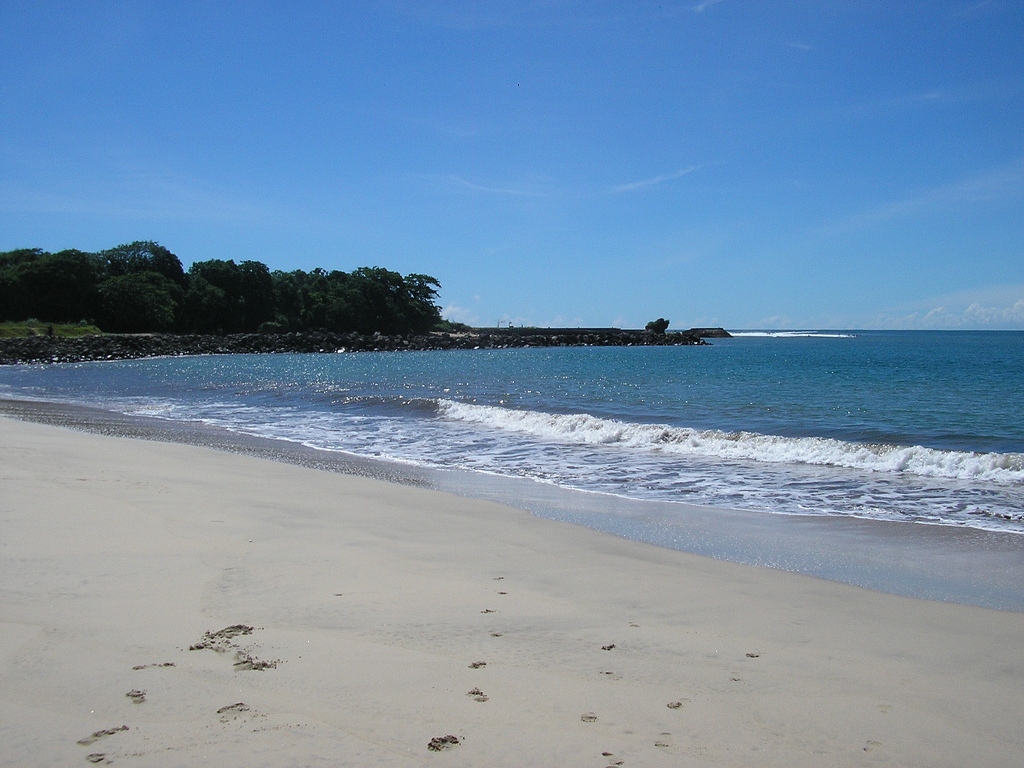
- Pamengpeuk Beach

- Location In Java
- Coordinates: 7°38′0″S 107°43′0″E
- Country: Indonesia
- Province: West Java
- Regency: Garut Regency
- District: District of Pameungpeuk
- Time zone: UTC+7 (WIB)

Pameungpeuk is an administrative district (kecamatan) in Garut Regency, West Java Province, Indonesia (not to be confused with the district of the same name in Bandung Regency, also part of West Java). The district is about 86 km from the capital city of Garut Regency to the south. Its administrative center is in Mandalakasih Village (Desa Mandalakasih). This district is located in the southern part of Garut and is the most developed district center in the region. It is located 131 kilometres by road south of Bandung.

== History ==
Pameungpeuk was previously known as Nagara, as it was anticipated to become as bustling as the Sunda Kelapa port in Jakarta (formerly Batavia). Initially, this district was part of Sukapura Regency before becoming part of Garut Regency.

Pameungpeuk is an area located at the foot of Mount Nagara in the southern region. The name of this area originates from an event during the reign of Prabu Arbawisesa, the ruler of the Bones Kingdom and the eldest son of Prabu Geusan Ulun.

After Prabu Geusan Ulun died and was buried in Ci Lautereun, Prabu Arbawisesa led the kingdom. One night, he had a dream in which he saw his father's grave submerged by the overflowing waters of the Ci Lautereun River, caused by the strong currents of the Ci Mandalakasih River. Realizing the potential disaster that could occur, he decided to divert the river's flow.

Accompanied by his people, Prabu Arbawisesa traced the course of the Cimandalakasih (Mandalakasih River) until they reached an area now known as Cikoneng. He observed that the eastern part of the area had a gentler landscape, making it suitable for redirecting the water flow. He then ordered his followers to build a dam by stacking large stones. However, a large gap remained in the middle of the river, allowing water to continue flowing rapidly through it.

To complete the dam, Prabu Arbawisesa used his supernatural powers to lift a massive stone and place it in the remaining gap, successfully blocking the water flow. In Sundanese, the act of obstructing or blocking a water current is called meungpeuk. From that moment on, the location where the dam stood became known as Batu Pameungpeuk, which over time evolved into the name Pameungpeuk. Note that there is also a different Pameungpeuk District in Bandung Regency.

Pameungpeuk was originally a larger area known as Kawedanan Nagara it was initially thought to be busy sub-district because an international port would be built like Sunda Kelapa Port in Jakarta (formerly Batavia). Before becoming part of Limbangan Regency (Garut) at that time, Kawedanan Nagara was initially included in Sukapura Regency (Tasikmalaya). This district was centered in Pameungpeuk, with an administrative area that included the districts of Pameungpeuk, Bodjong, Rantjaherang, and Cisompet, before finally being divided into four separate districts in 1882: Cisompet, Cikelet, Cibalong, and Pameungpeuk itself.

During the Dutch colonial era, Kawedanan Nagara (including the present-day Pameungpeuk District) was one of the largest rubber plantation regions in West Java, managed by the Dutch East Indies government. In the 1930s, the southern part of Garut experienced rapid growth in the plantation sector, particularly in rubber production.

Several rubber processing factories were established in Cibalong, Cikelet (Condong), Cisompet (Bunisari Lendra), and Pameungpeuk (Bangbayang). The rubber produced in this region was exported internationally to meet the growing global demand for this commodity.

To support the export activities, the Santolo Port, locally known as Cilautereun (meaning "resting water"), was constructed in the 1920s. It served as a major shipping hub for rubber and other agricultural commodities from Kawedanan Nagara (Pameungpeuk). The shipping route for rubber and tea exports began in Batavia (Jakarta), following the Java Sea westward, then turning into the Sunda Strait before heading south. Ships would stop at Tinjil Island, then Pelabuhan Ratu (Sukabumi) to collect additional rubber and tea from the surrounding plantations. The journey then continued to Santolo Port (Pameungpeuk), where more goods were loaded before the ships returned to Batavia (Jakarta) for international distribution.

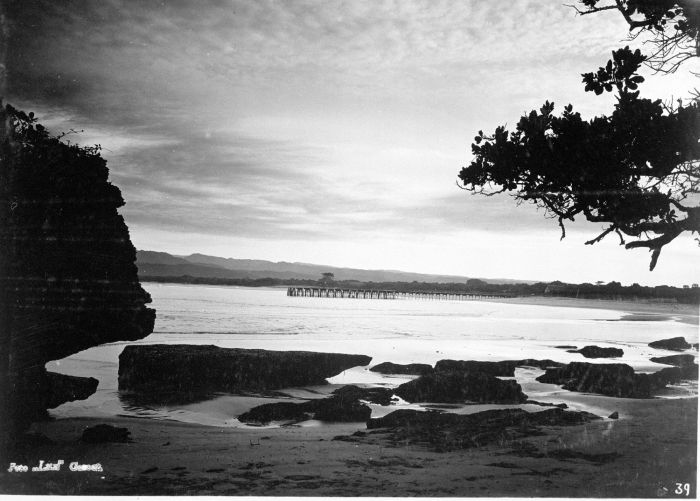
Pameungpeuk between 1920 and 1940. Photo by Thilly Weissenborn

During the Indonesian National Revolution in 1947, three Dutch soldiers were taken prisoner by Indonesian forces in Pameungpeuk. This occurred after an American naval plane they were traveling on was forced to make an emergency landing at the Pameungpeuk airfield due to fuel exhaustion.

== Geography ==
=== Borderline ===
Pameungpeuk District is located in the southern region of Garut Regency with the following boundaries:

North	Cisompet District
East	Cisompet District and Cibalong District
South	Indian Ocean
West	Cikelet District

=== Land Use ===
Pameungpeuk District in Garut is primarily characterized by low-lying terrain, with elevations ranging from 0 to 80 meters above sea level. This coastal location directly faces the Indian Ocean, while the northern parts bordering Cikelet and Cisompet exhibit a more hilly and rugged landscape.

The diverse elevation contributes to a variety of agricultural products, particularly lowland vegetables such as rice, chili peppers, spinach, and long beans. Agriculture dominates land use, especially in East Pameungpeuk, where Mandalakasih village (Tegal Buleud) is renowned for its exceptional rice cultivation, dating back to the Dutch colonial era. Coconut plantations thrive near Cibalong, while rubber plantations are prominent near Cisompet and Cikelet.

Beyond agriculture, the district also comprises residential areas and villages. With ongoing development, Pameungpeuk has become the most densely populated district in southern Garut Regency.

=== Climate ===
According to the Köppen climate classification, Pameungpeuk District is an area with a wet tropical climate (Af). Most of the Pameungpeuk District area has a gentle lowland contour and faces directly onto the Indian Ocean (the southern coastline of West Java).

The average annual temperature range in Pameungpeuk District is 26 °C to 32 °C, with average rainfall of 2000 to 2500 mm per year.

== Sub-district/Village ==
Pameungpeuk District has 8 (eight) villages, including the following:

1. Bojong
2. Bojong Kidul
3. Jatimulya
4. Mancagahar
5. Mandalakasih
6. Paas
7. Pameungpeuk
8. Sirnabakti

== Economy ==
Most of the people of Pameungpeuk, Garut Regency work as farmers, fishermen, and also traders. The main agricultural commodity from Pameungpeuk sub-district is rice which is managed for personal consumption and sent to various other areas.

This sub-district has a main traditional market, namely the Pameungpeuk market, Garut as a place for buying and selling and also the most important economic center for the people in the Pameungpeuk sub-district and its surroundings.

In addition to the Pameungpeuk traditional market, there is also Plaza Mandalakasih as another trading center in Pameungpeuk District. Pameungpeuk District also has several national minimarket retail branches such as Indomaret, Alfamart and Yomart which are spread across various areas within Pameungpeuk District.

== Demographics ==
=== Population ===
The total population of Pameungpeuk District in 2022 reached 44,970 people, consisting of 22,729 male and 22,241 female. This area has a population density of 2,118 people per square kilometer, with details of population data per village as follows

Sub-district	Male	Female	Total
Mancagahar	2,686	2,628	5,314
Pameungpeuk	4,150	4,143	8,293
Mandalakasih	3,106	3,064	6,170
Sirnabakti	3,268	3,095	6,363
Paas	3,359	3,352	6,711
Bojong	1,866	1,794	3,660
Jatimulya	2,980	2,902	5,882
Bojong Kidul	1,314	1,263	2,577

Pameungpeuk District is dominated by Sundanese people, with a percentage reaching 95.12% of the total population. Meanwhile, other ethnic groups are spread in small proportions, including Javanese, Batak, Minangkabau, Madurese, Malay and together with other tribes in smaller numbers.

As one of the most developed areas in the southern region of Garut Regency, the majority of the population of Pameungpeuk District depend on trade, agriculture and other agribusiness sectors for their livelihoods. This is in line with the geographical and economic characteristics of the region which are dominated by agricultural activities.

==== Language ====
The primary language spoken by the residents of Pameungpeuk District is the East Priangan dialect of Sundanese, with the Pameungpeuk accent as their native tongue and primary mode of communication.

Indonesian also serves as the primary language for work, education, and inter-ethnic communication within the district.

==== Religion ====
The vast majority of Pameungpeuk sub-district's population is Muslim (99.85%), with a small minority adhering to other religions, primarily Protestant Christianity and Catholicism.

== Telecommunication ==
Pameungpeuk District is an area that can be reached by 4G cellular telecommunications signals from various Indonesian national cellular telephone operators (Telkomsel, Indosat and XL Axiata).

In addition, Telkom Indonesia's telephone and cable internet network can reach the Pameungpeuk sub-district and surrounding areas with the telephone number code +62 262 - (521/522/2520-xxx).

Pameungpeuk District has a branch of the Indonesian Post Office and logistics delivery services from other service providers with postal code 44175.

== Education ==
In the 2022/2023 academic year, the general data on educational facilities in Pameungpeuk District are as follows

Level of education	State	Private	Amount
Kindergarten (TK)	0	6	6
Raudatul Athfal (RA)	0	19	19
Elementary School (SD)	26	1	27
Elementary Islamic School / Madrasah Ibtidaiyah (MI)	0	7	7
Junior High School (SMP)	2	4	6
Islamic Junior High School (MTs) / Madrasah Tsanawiyah (MTs)	1	8	8
Senior High School (SMA)	1	2	3
Vocational High School (SMK)	0	4	4
Islamic Senior High School / Madrasah Aliyah(MA)	1	2	3

=== Elementary School ===
Elementary schools are distributed all across eight villages within Pameungpeuk District, with each village typically having 4 to 5 public or private institutions.

=== Junior High School ===
Pameungpeuk District has two state junior high schools (SMPN), namely as follows:

1. SMP Negeri 1 Pameungpeuk
2. SMP Negeri 2 Pameungpeuk

=== Senior High School ===
Pameungpeuk District has one state senior high school (SMAN) and one state Islamic high school (MAN), namely as follows:

1. SMA Negeri 5 Garut (formerly SMA Negeri 1 Pameungpeuk)
2. MA Negeri 3 Garut (formerly MA Negeri 1 Pameungpeuk).

== Health ==
Pameungpeuk District possesses a comprehensive healthcare infrastructure comprising one main District Health Center (Puskesmas Pameungpeuk) and six Assistant Health Centers strategically distributed across the sub-district.

There is Pameungpeuk Regional Hospital (Rumah Sakit Umum Daerah Pameungpeuk), a Provincial Level Hospital that serves as the primary referral center for the southern region of Garut Regency and its environs.

== Transportation ==
Pameungpeuk District has a strategic location right in the middle of the southern coast of West Java. This district is crossed by the South Coast National Road (Jalan Nasional Pantai Selatan Jawa) of West Java, which connects Pangandaran to Pelabuhan Ratu (Sukabumi Regency).

Pameungpeuk is the center of the main route of Jalan Raya Pameungpeuk - Garut City, which is the Regency road route that connects the northern part of Garut to the southern part of Garut. The distance from the Capital of Garut Regency to Pameungpeuk District is 84 km which can be covered in 3–4 hours of land travel.

Pameungpeuk District enjoys excellent connectivity with various regions. Public transportation options are readily available, including buses and minibuses departing from Pameungpeuk Terminal. These routes connect the district to major cities such as Garut City, Bandung City, and Tasikmalaya City:

1. Pameungpeuk - Cikajang - Garut Kota
2. Pameungpeuk - Garut City - Bandung City (Cicaheum Terminal)
3. Pameungpeuk - Garut City - Bandung City (Leuwipanjang Terminal)
4. Pangandaran - Cipatujah (Tasikmalaya) - Pameungpeuk - Rancabuaya - Sindangbarang
5. Pameungpeuk - Cipatujah (Tasikmalaya) - Karangnunggal (Tasikmalaya) - Tasikmalaya City

In addition to inter-district public transportation, there is local transportation between areas around Pameungpeuk sub-district known as Angkutan Desa (Village Car) with the following routes:

1. Pameungpeuk - Depok, Cisompet
2. Pameungpeuk - Sukanagara - Panyindangan, Cisompet
3. Pameungpeuk - Cisompet Village, Cisompet
4. Pameungpeuk - Cibalong, Garut
5. Pameungpeuk - Cibalong, Garut - Sancang, Cibalong
6. Pameungpeuk - Cibalong Village - Maroko Village, Cibalong
7. Pameungpeuk - Cikelet Village, Cikelet

Local transportation in Pameungpeuk District serves several routes every day from 05.00 to 13.00 WIB (GMT +7), and there are Ojek (Public Motorcycle) Bases spread across various villages to connect between villages in the Pameungpeuk District area.

== Tourism ==
Pameungpeuk District is one of the quite famous areas and is the center of tourist attractions in Garut Regency, although many tourist attractions are located outside the Pameungpeuk District area, but according to some people from outside the area, many consider the tourist attractions to be in Pameungpeuk District. The tourist attractions that are right in the Pameungpeuk District area are as follows:

- Sayang Heulang Beach (Pantai Sayang Heulang)
- Teletubbies Hill (Bukit Teletubbies)
- Cilauterun Estuary (Muara Cilautereun)
