= Indonesian Quarantine Agency =

Government agency of Indonesia

- Badan Karantina Indonesia
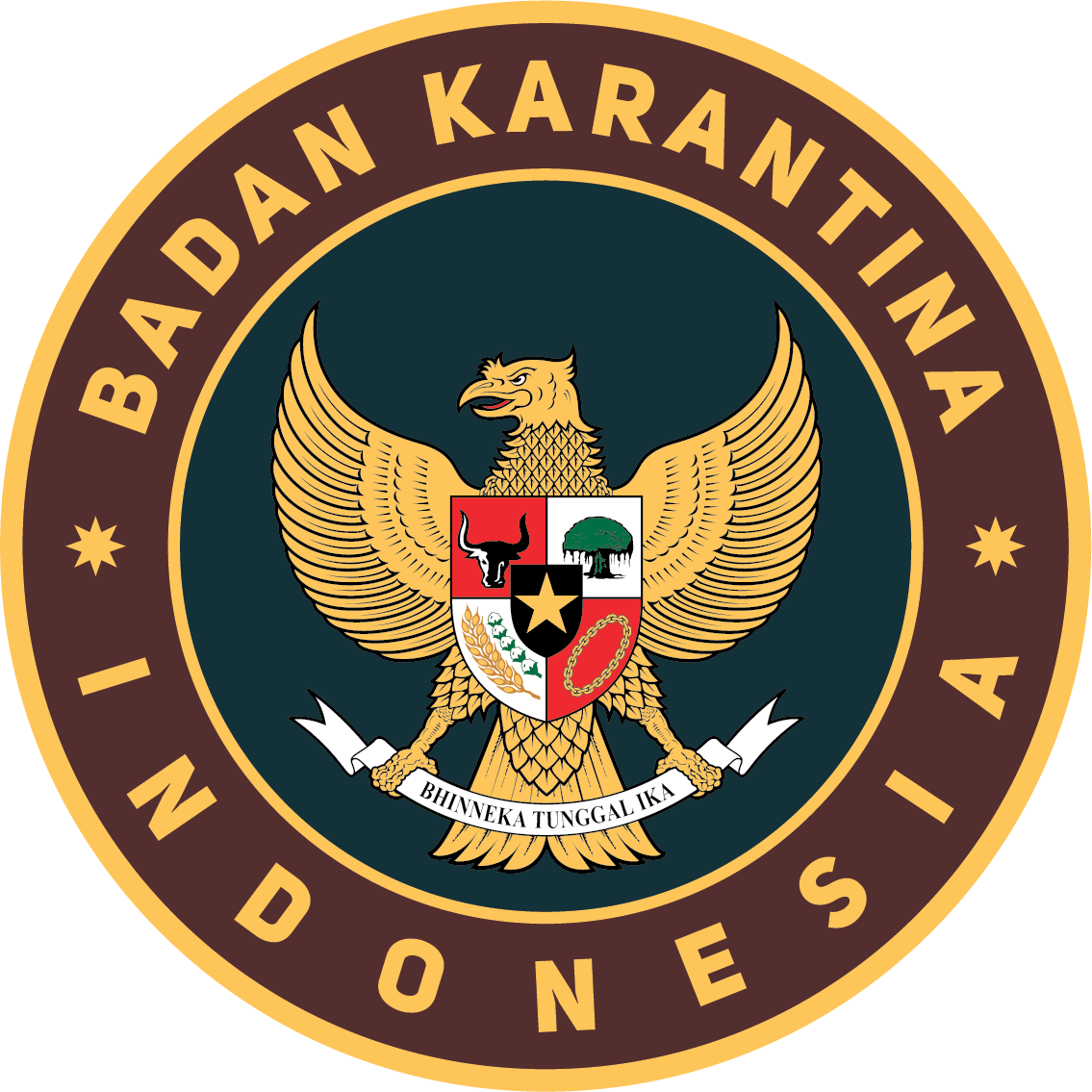

Agency overview
- Formed: 20 July 2023
- Preceding agencies: Agency for Agricultural Quarantine, Ministry of Agriculture; Agency for Fish Quarantine, Quality Control and Safety of Fishery Products, Ministry of Marine Affairs and Fisheries
- Jurisdiction: Indonesia
- Employees: 5,066+
- Agency executive: Abdul Kadir Karding, Chief
- Website: karantinaindonesia.go.id

The Indonesian Quarantine Agency (Indonesian: Badan Karantina Indonesia, Barantin) is a cabinet-level government agency responsible for enforcing Indonesian animal, fish, and plant quarantine code formed in 2023. It was founded by Joko Widodo in his second administration.

== History ==
=== Pre-Pusrantan Period ===
During Johannes van den Bosch tenure as Governor-General in Dutch East Indies, he established cultuurstelsel system to force cultivate economically important cash crops for taxation and export. One of the cash crops planted was coffee. In 1877, due to outbreak of coffee leaf rust disease in Ceylon, the Dutch Indies Government issued Ordnance of 19 December 1877 (Staatsblad 1877 No. 262), which forbids importation of Coffee plants and beans from Ceylon in fear of spread of the disease in Dutch East Indies. In 1914, Dutch Indies Government issued Ordnance of 28 January 1914 (Staatsblad 1914 No. 161) which mandated formation of board of experts to examine fruits imported of Australia before being marketed in Dutch East Indies due to outbreak of Mediterranean fruit fly in Australia. With this 1914 ordnance, Institute for Plant Pathology and Cultivation (Instituut voor Plantenzekten en Cultures) was established, with Plant Quarantine Service (Plantenquarantine Dienst) as the Plant Quarantine arm of the institute. In 1939, port plant quarantine station system was established on every major trading port which led by stationed officer of Instituut voor Plantenzekten en Cultures with rank of Plantenziektenkundigeambtenaar (Expert officer-in-charge in Plant Pathology).

In post-Indonesian independence, {Instituut voor Plantenzekten en Cultures was renamed to Balai Penyelidik Hama Tumbuh-tumbuhan (Research Center for Plant Pathology, BPHT) under the Department of Welfare and then become Department of Agriculture. In 1961, BPHT was elevated and transformed into Lembaga Penelitian Hama dan Penyakit Tumbuhan (Institute for Plant Pests and Disease Research, LPHT), becoming one of 28 research institutes directly reported under Jawatan Penelitian Pertanian (Agricultural Research Service) of the Department of Agriculture. However, responsibility of plant quarantine was divided within the Department of Agriculture, with formation of Division of Quarantine of the Bureau Foreign Relations under General Secretariat of the Department of Agriculture in 1966. In 1973, Direktorat Karantina Tumbuhan (Directorate of Plant Quarantine) is formed within Department of Agriculture to amalgamate Plant Quarantine functions of the ministry.

=== Pusrantan Period ===
On 26 August 1974, Indonesian Agency for Agricultural Research and Development (Badan Penelitian dan Pengembangan Pertanian, Balitbangtan), was founded by President Suharto, through issuance of Presidential Decision No. 45/1974. The Directorate of Plant Quarantine was demoted into Pusat Karantina Pertanian (Center for Agricultural Quarantine, Pusrantan) and become part of the Balitbangtan. Despite the demotion, the organization of the Pusrantan was developed and expanded into a massive organization within the Balitbangtan, with 1 national center as organization coordination center, 5 research and quarantine institutes, 14 research and quarantine stations, and 105 regional quarantine offices constituting it at its peak in 1980. In 1983, animal quarantine function began to be developed within Pusrantan. Due to Pusrantan massive size, despite being part of Balitbangtan, the Pusrantan was received administrative guidance of Balitbangtan and Directorate General of Livestock (Direktorat General Peternakan, Ditjennak) for administrative guidance for plant and animal quarantine affairs. Eventually, Balitbangtan and Ditjennak relinquished its responsibility over Pusrantan to the General Secretariat of the Department of Agriculture in 1985.

During Pusrantan period, Indonesian Government passed Indonesian animal, fish, and plant quarantine code, Law No. 16/1992 in 1992.

=== Baranas Period ===
In 1995, Pusrantan transferred to a short-lived Agribusiness Agency (Badan Agribisnis) of the Ministry of Agriculture, which then briefly elevated into National Quarantine Agency (Badan Karantina Nasional, Baranas) in 2000, which also short-lived.

With subsequent formation of the Ministry of Marine Affairs and Fisheries from Ministry of Marine Exploration in 2001, Baranas disbanded and separated into 2 agencies: Badan Karantina Pertanian (Agency for Agricultural Quarantine, Barantan) of the Ministry of Agriculture and Badan Karantina Ikan, Pengendalian Mutu, dan Keamanan Hasil Perikanan (Agency for Fish Quarantine, Quality Control and Safety of Fishery Products, BKIPMKHP) of the Ministry of Marine Affairs and Fisheries thru Presidential Decree No. 58/2001.

=== Formation of Barantin ===
Prior establishment of Barantin, previous Indonesian animal, fish, and plant quarantine code, Law No. 16/1992, was deemed outdated and did not meet satisfaction of and not accommodating national interest and public safety concerns the spread of disease or pests. The old Indonesian quarantine code later replaced by Law No. 21/2019 which passed by the People's Representative Council on 24 September 2019.

According to the old 1992 quarantine code, Ministry of Agriculture was solely responsible on enforcement of the code. Since the reformasi, some parts of the enforcement also being split into Ministry of Marine Affairs and Fisheries. Thus, there were two agencies responsible in enforcement of the Indonesian quarantine code:

- Agency for Agricultural Quarantine under The Ministry of Agriculture: Enforcing the regulations of animal and plant quarantine.
- Agency for Fish Quarantine, Quality Control and Safety of Fishery Products under The Ministry of Marine Affairs and Fisheries: Enforcing the regulations of fish quarantine, and also quality control and safety of fishery products.

In addition, Law No. 21/2019 also expands the scope of animal, fish, and plant quarantine to include monitoring and control of invasive species as well as wild plants and animals, which is under the responsibility of Directorate General of Nature Resources and Ecosystem Conservation under The Ministry of Environment and Forestry. Article 8 of Law No. 21/2019 mandated the formation of "integrative agency" to integrate the enforcement of the Indonesian quarantine code in 2 years. However, the process was delayed until 4 years after the passage of the 2019 Indonesian quarantine code. On 6 July 2023 Joko Widodo signed Government Regulation No. 29/2023, established the Indonesian quarantine framework and named Badan Karantina Indonesia as the name of the integrative agency to enforce the code. He later signed Presidential Decree No. 45/2023 on 20 July 2023, established the agency and set the agency as a cabinet-level agency. On 14 September 2023, he appointed Sahat Manaor Panggabean, a close confidante of Luhut Binsar Pandjaitan, as Chief of Barantin.

Immediately after his appointment, Sahat recruited 100 men from Ministry of Agriculture, Ministry of Marine Affairs and Fisheries, Ministry of Environment and Forestry and named his team as Tim 100 (Team 100) for rapid consolidation and organization of Barantin. On 25 October 2023, the Barantin organization finalized. Wisnu Haryana, then Acting Main Secretary of Barantin, revealed that 3,739 men from the Ministry of Agriculture, 1,327 men from the Ministry of Marine Affairs and Fisheries, and "a few" men from the Ministry of Environment and Forestry joined Barantin. The fusion also slimmed from 52 quarantine stations of Agency for Agricultural Quarantine and 47 quarantine stations of Agency for Fish Quarantine, Quality Control and Safety of Fishery Products into 40 quarantine stations that will be operated by Barantin.

== Organization ==
Following Chief of Barantin Decree No.1/2023 and 2/2023, the full structure of Barantin is as follows:

- Office of the Chief of Barantin
- Main Secretariat
  - Bureau of Organization and Human Resources
  - Bureau of General Affairs and Finance
  - Bureau of Planning and Partnership
  - Bureau of Legal Affairs and Public Relation
- Deputy I (Animal Quarantine)
  - Directorate of Animal Quarantine Standards
  - Directorate of Animal Quarantine Risk Management
  - Directorate of Animal Quarantine Measures
- Deputy II (Fish Quarantine)
  - Directorate of Fish Quarantine Standards
  - Directorate of Fish Quarantine Risk Management
  - Directorate of Fish Quarantine Measures
- Deputy III (Plant Quarantine)
  - Directorate of Plant Quarantine Standards
  - Directorate of Plant Quarantine Risk Management
  - Directorate of Plant Quarantine Measures
- Centers
  - Center for Animal, Fish, and Plant Quarantine Data and Information System
  - Center for Animal, Fish, and Plant Quarantine Human Resources Development
- Inspectorate
- Technical Implementation Units
  - Indonesian Quarantine Centers for Animal, Fish, and Plants
    - North Sumatera Animal, Fish, and Plants Quarantine Center, Medan
      - Kualanamu Airport Quarantine Servicing Station
      - Sisingamaraja Airport Quarantine Servicing Station
      - Port Belawan Quarantine Servicing Station
      - Port Tanjung Balai Asahan Quarantine Servicing Station
      - Sibolga Maritime Port Quarantine Servicing Station
    - Jakarta Animal, Fish, and Plants Quarantine Center, Jakarta
      - Tanjung Priok Maritime Port Quarantine Servicing Station
      - Sunda Kelapa Maritime Port Quarantine Servicing Station
      - Halim Perdanakusuma Airport Quarantine Servicing Station
    - East Kalimantan Animal, Fish, and Plants Quarantine Center, Balikpapan
      - Sultan Aji Muhammad Sulaiman Quarantine Servicing Station
      - Samarinda Riverine Port Quarantine Servicing Station
      - Kariangau Maritime Port Quarantine Servicing Station
      - Semayang Maritime Port Quarantine Servicing Station
      - Lok Tuan Bontang Maritime Port Quarantine Servicing Station
      - A.P.T. Pranoto Airport Quarantine Servicing Station
      - Berau Maritime Port Quarantine Servicing Station
    - Bali Animal, Fish, and Plants Quarantine Center, Denpasar
      - I Gusti Ngurah Rai Airport Quarantine Servicing Station
      - Celukan Bawang Maritime Port Quarantine Servicing Station
      - Padang Baai Crossing Port Quarantine Servicing Station
      - Gilimanuk Crossing Port Quarantine Servicing Station
    - South Sulawesi Animal, Fish, and Plants Quarantine Center, Makassar
      - Hasanuddin Airport Quarantine Servicing Station
      - Parepare Maritime Port Quarantine Servicing Station
      - Jeneponto Maritime Port Quarantine Servicing Station
      - Bajoe Maritime Port Quarantine Servicing Station
    - Papua Animal, Fish, and Plants Quarantine Center, Jayapura
      - Sentani Airport Quarantine Servicing Station
      - Jayapura Maritime Port Quarantine Servicing Station
      - Biak Maritime Port Quarantine Servicing Station
      - Skouw Indonesia-Papua New Guinea Border Checkpoint Post Quarantine Servicing Station
      - Serui Maritime Port Quarantine Servicing Station
  - Indonesian Quarantine Offices for Animal, Fish, and Plants
    - Nanggroe Aceh Darussalam Animal, Fish, and Plants Quarantine Office, Banda Aceh
      - Iskandar Muda Airport Quarantine Servicing Station
      - Sabang Maritime Port Quarantine Servicing Station
      - Lhokseumawe Maritime Port Quarantine Servicing Station
      - Meulaboh Maritime Port Quarantine Servicing Station
      - Sinabang Maritime Port Quarantine Servicing Station
      - Kuala Langsa Maritime Port Quarantine Servicing Station
      - Simeuleu Maritime Port Quarantine Servicing Station
    - Riau Islands Animal, Fish, and Plants Quarantine Office, Batam
      - Hang Nadim Airport Quarantine Servicing Station
      - Raja Haji Fisabilillah Airport Quarantine Servicing Station
      - Telaga Punggur Maritime Port Quarantine Servicing Station
      - Port Tanjung Uban Quarantine Servicing Station
      - Kijang Maritime Port Quarantine Servicing Station
      - Port Tanjung Balai Karimun Quarantine Servicing Station
      - Port Tanjung Batu Quarantine Servicing Station
      - Moro Maritime Port Quarantine Servicing Station
      - Natuna Maritime Port Quarantine Servicing Station
    - West Sumatera Animal, Fish, and Plants Quarantine Office, Padang
      - Minangkabau Airport Quarantine Servicing Station
      - Mentawai Maritime Port Quarantine Servicing Station
    - Riau Animal, Fish, and Plants Quarantine Office, Pekanbaru
      - Sultan Syarif Kasim II Airport Quarantine Servicing Station
      - Dumai Maritime Port Quarantine Servicing Station
      - Bengkalis Maritime Port Quarantine Servicing Station
      - Tembilahan Maritime Port Quarantine Servicing Station
      - Selat Panjang Maritime Port Quarantine Servicing Station
      - Sungai Guntung Maritime Port Quarantine Servicing Station
      - Tanjung Buton Maritime Port Quarantine Servicing Station
    - Jambi Animal, Fish, and Plants Quarantine Office, Jambi
      - Sultan Thaha Airport Quarantine Servicing Station
      - Kuala Tungkal Maritime Port Quarantine Servicing Station
    - Bengkulu Animal, Fish, and Plants Quarantine Office, Bengkulu
      - Fatmawati Airport Quarantine Servicing Station
    - Bangka and Belitung Islands Animal, Fish, and Plants Quarantine Office, Pangkal Pinang
      - Hanan Judin Airport Quarantine Servicing Station
      - Depati Amir Airport Quarantine Servicing Station
      - Port Muntok Quarantine Servicing Station
      - Pangkalan Balam Maritime Port Quarantine Servicing Station
    - South Sumatera Animal, Fish, and Plants Quarantine Office, Palembang
      - Sultan Mahmud Badaruddin Airport Quarantine Servicing Station
      - Port Tanjung Api-api Quarantine Servicing Station
    - Lampung Animal, Fish, and Plants Quarantine Office, Bandar Lampung
      - Raden Inten II Airport Quarantine Servicing Station
      - Bakauheni Crossing Port Quarantine Servicing Station
    - Banten Office for Animal, Fish, and Plants, Serang
      - Soekarno-Hatta Airport Quarantine Servicing Station
      - Merak Crossing Port Quarantine Servicing Station
    - West Java Animal, Fish, and Plants Quarantine Office, Bandung
      - Kertajati Airport Quarantine Servicing Station
      - Cirebon Maritime Port Quarantine Servicing Station
    - Central Java Animal, Fish, and Plants Quarantine Office, Semarang
      - Adi Sumarno Airport Quarantine Servicing Station
      - Ahmad Yani Airport Quarantine Servicing Station
      - Tanjung Intan Maritime Port Quarantine Servicing Station
      - Tegal Maritime Port Quarantine Servicing Station
    - Yogyakarta Animal, Fish, and Plants Quarantine Office, Yogyakarta
      - Yogyakarta International Airport Quarantine Servicing Station
      - Adi Sucipto Airport Quarantine Servicing Station
    - East Java Animal, Fish, and Plants Quarantine Office, Surabaya
      - Juanda Airport Quarantine Servicing Station
      - Ketapang Crossing Port Quarantine Servicing Station
      - Abdul Rahman Saleh Airport Quarantine Servicing Station
      - Tanjung Perak Maritime Port Quarantine Servicing Station
      - Port Pulau Kangean Quarantine Servicing Station
      - Bangkalan Quarantine Servicing Station
    - West Nusa Tenggara Animal, Fish, and Plants Quarantine Office, Mataram
      - Lombok Airport Quarantine Servicing Station
      - Lembar Maritime Port Quarantine Servicing Station
      - Bima Maritime Port Quarantine Servicing Station
      - Sape Crossing Port Quarantine Servicing Station
      - Badas Port Quarantine Servicing Station
      - Kayangan Maritime Port Quarantine Servicing Station
      - Poto Tano Maritime Port Quarantine Servicing Station
    - East Nusa Tenggara Animal, Fish, and Plants Quarantine Office, Kupang
      - El Tari Airport Quarantine Servicing Station
      - Ende Maritime Port Quarantine Servicing Station
      - Reo Maritime Port Quarantine Servicing Station
      - Waingapu Maritime Port Quarantine Servicing Station
      - Sabu Maritime Port Quarantine Servicing Station
      - Rote Maritime Port Quarantine Servicing Station
      - Atapupu Maritime Port Quarantine Servicing Station
      - Alor Maritime Port Quarantine Servicing Station
      - Waikelo Maritime Port Quarantine Servicing Station
      - Labuan Bajo Maritime Port Quarantine Servicing Station
      - Maumere Maritime Port Quarantine Servicing Station
      - Wini Indonesia-Timor Leste Border Checkpoint Post Quarantine Servicing Station
      - Motaain Indonesia-Timor Leste Border Checkpoint Post Quarantine Servicing Station
      - Motaasin Indonesia-Timor Leste Border Checkpoint Post Quarantine Servicing Station
    - West Kalimantan Animal, Fish, and Plants Quarantine Office, Pontianak
      - Supadio Airport Quarantine Servicing Station
      - Rahadi Usman Airport Quarantine Servicing Station
      - Entikong Indonesia-Malaysia Border Checkpoint Post Quarantine Servicing Station
      - Aruk Indonesia-Malaysia Border Checkpoint Post Quarantine Servicing Station
      - Nanga Badau Indonesia-Malaysia Border Checkpoint Post Quarantine Servicing Station
      - Jagoi Babang Indonesia-Malaysia Border Checkpoint Post Quarantine Servicing Station
    - South Kalimantan Animal, Fish, and Plants Quarantine Office, Banjarmasin
      - Syamsuddin Noor Airport Quarantine Servicing Station
      - Batu Licin Maritime Port Quarantine Servicing Station
      - Kotabaru Maritime Port Quarantine Servicing Station
    - Central Kalimantan Animal, Fish, and Plants Quarantine Office, Palangkaraya
      - Tjilik Riwut Airport Quarantine Servicing Station
      - Pangkalan Bun Maritime Port Quarantine Servicing Station
      - Sampit Maritime Port Quarantine Servicing Station
    - North Kalimantan Animal, Fish, and Plants Quarantine Office, Tarakan
      - Juwata Airport Tarakan Quarantine Servicing Station
      - Tanjung Selor Maritime Port Quarantine Servicing Station
      - Sebatik Indonesia-Malaysia Border Checkpoint Post Quarantine Servicing Station
      - Nunukan Indonesia-Malaysia Border Checkpoint Post Quarantine Servicing Station
    - Southeast Sulawesi Animal, Fish, and Plants Quarantine Office, Kendari
      - Halu Oleo Airport Quarantine Servicing Station
      - Betoambari Airport Quarantine Servicing Station
      - Kendari Maritime Port Quarantine Servicing Station
      - Kolaka Maritime Port Quarantine Servicing Station
      - Raha Muna Maritime Port Quarantine Servicing Station
      - Wanci Wakatobi Maritime Port Quarantine Servicing Station
    - Central Sulawesi Animal, Fish, and Plants Quarantine Office, Palu
      - Mutiara Sis Al-Jufri Airport Quarantine Servicing Station
      - Port Pantoloan Quarantine Servicing Station
      - Luwuk Banggai Maritime Port Quarantine Servicing Station
      - Toli-toli Maritime Port Quarantine Servicing Station
    - West Sulawesi Animal, Fish, and Plants Quarantine Office, Mamuju
      - Tampa Padang Airport Quarantine Servicing Station
      - Pasang Kayu Maritime Port Quarantine Servicing Station
      - Majene Maritime Port Quarantine Servicing Station
    - North Sulawesi Animal, Fish, and Plants Quarantine Office, Manado
      - Sam Ratulangi Airport Quarantine Servicing Station
      - Bitung Maritime Port Quarantine Servicing Station
      - Tahuna Maritime Port Quarantine Servicing Station
    - Gorontalo Animal, Fish, and Plants Quarantine Office, Gorontalo
      - Jalaluddin Airport Quarantine Servicing Station
    - North Maluku Animal, Fish, and Plants Quarantine Office, Ternate
      - Sultan Babullah Airport Quarantine Servicing Station
      - Tobelo Maritime Port Quarantine Servicing Station
      - Bacan Maritime Port Quarantine Servicing Station
      - Sanana Maritime Port Quarantine Servicing Station
      - Morotai Maritime Port Quarantine Servicing Station
    - Maluku Animal, Fish, and Plants Quarantine Office, Ambon
      - Pattimura Airport Quarantine Servicing Station
      - Tual Maritime Port Quarantine Servicing Station
      - Kobisadar Port Quarantine Servicing Station
      - Namlea Maritime Port Quarantine Servicing Station
      - Dobo Maritime Port Quarantine Servicing Station
    - West Papua Animal, Fish, and Plants Quarantine Office, Manokwari
      - Bintuni Maritime Port Quarantine Servicing Station
      - Wasior Maritime Port Quarantine Servicing Station
    - Southwest Papua Animal, Fish, and Plants Quarantine Office, Sorong
      - Kaimana Maritime Port Quarantine Servicing Station
      - Fakfak Maritime Port Quarantine Servicing Station
    - Central Papua Animal, Fish, and Plants Quarantine Office, Mimika
      - Nabire Maritime Port Quarantine Servicing Station
    - Highlands Papua Animal, Fish, and Plants Quarantine Office, Jayawijaya
    - South Papua Animal, Fish, and Plants Quarantine Office, Merauke
      - Mopah Airport Quarantine Servicing Station
      - Sungai Bade Riverine Port Quarantine Servicing Station
      - Sota Indonesia-Papua New Guinea Border Checkpoint Post Quarantine Servicing Station
      - Yetetkun Boven Digoel Indonesia-Papua New Guinea Border Checkpoint Post Quarantine Servicing Station
  - Indonesian Institute for Animal, Fish, and Plants Quarantine Testing Standardization, Jakarta
  - Indonesian Center for Animal, Fish, and Plants Quarantine Techniques and Methods Development, Jakarta
