= Research Organization for Health =

Indonesian research organization

- Organisasi Riset Kesehatan (OR Kesehatan)

Agency overview
- Formed: 1 March 2022
- Preceding agencies: National Institute of Health Research and Development of Ministry of Health; Eijkman Molecular Biology Research Center of Life Sciences Research Organization; Indonesian Research Center for Veterinary Sciences of Ministry of Agriculture
- Jurisdiction: Indonesia
- Agency executive: Ni Luh Putu Indi Dharmayanti, Head of OR Kesehatan
- Parent agency: National Research and Innovation Agency
- Website: https://brin.go.id/ork/

The Research Organization for Health (Indonesian: Organisasi Riset Kesehatan, OR Kesehatan) is one of Research Organizations under the umbrella of the National Research and Innovation Agency (Badan Riset dan Inovasi Nasional, BRIN). The organization is transformation of National Institute of Health Research and Development (Badan Penelitian dan Pengembangan Kesehatan, Balitbangkes) of Ministry of Health (Kementerian Kesehatan, Kemenkes).

On 24 January 2022, it is announced that the organization extended with fusion of elements from Eijkman Molecular Biology Research Center, and Indonesian Research Center for Veterinary Sciences from Ministry of Agriculture. OR Kesehatan formation is finalized on 1 March 2022 and is functional since 4 March 2022.

== History ==
In response of formation of National Research and Innovation Agency as independent agency under the President of Indonesia, the Ministry of Health rearranged their research and development activities which had been organized thru its Balitbangkes. In the plan, Balitbangkes will be transformed into Agency for Health Policies Development (Badan Kebijakan Pembangunan Kesehatan, BKPK), a regulatory agency intended to provide only policies and standards making for state health activity, no longer doing research as the research part will be relinquished to BRIN.

On 7 November 2021, the Ministry issued order to Balitbangkes and its child agencies to halt their activities per 31 December 2021 as unit under auspices of Ministry of Health, effectively started the dismantlement of Balitbangkes. In the order, Balitbangkes will split into three parts: one part (which is the most) relinquished to BRIN, one part to become BKPK, and the rest of the Balitbangkes part in regional level will be relinquished to local government where the Balitbangkes branch formerly existed for being transformed into local-government run public health laboratories for being integrated as part of state public health laboratories system.

In 30 November 2021, BRIN announced that ORKG (tentative name of the future OR Kesehatan, as the organization yet to be formed formally at that time), transformation of the previously from Balitbangkes of will be activated and operated soon. On 24 January 2022, it is announced that the organization extended with Eijkman Molecular Biology Research Center and Indonesian Research Center for Veterinary Sciences from Ministry of Agriculture. It is announced that the organization expected to be formed on 1 February 2022 and named as OR Kesehatan instead of ORKG.

On 4 March 2022, OR Kesehatan is fully functional with inauguration of its first head, Ni Luh Putu Indi Dharmayanti.

== Structure ==
The structure of OR Kesehatan is as follows:

1. Office of the Head of OR Kesehatan
2. Research Center for Biomedical Research
  1. Research Group for Diagnostics and Biomedical Techniques
  2. Research Group for Clinical Macrobiology and Clinical Microbiology
  3. Research Group for Stem Cells, Animal Models, and Biological Markers
  4. Research Group for Lab-based Population Studies
3. Research Center for Preclinical and Clinical Medicine
  1. Research Group for Clinical Medicine
  2. Research Group for Regenerative Medicine
  3. Research Group for Medical Technology
4. Research Center for Public Health and Nutrition
  1. Research Group for Human Infectious Vectors and Zoonosis
  2. Research Group for Non-communicable Diseases and Mental Health
  3. Research Group for Health Services and Public Emergency Services
  4. Research Group for Public Health
  5. Research Group for Family Health and Reproductive Health
  6. Research Group for Healthcare in Rural and Marginal Areas
  7. Research Group for Environmental Health, Climate Change, and Occupational Health and Safety
5. Research Center for Pharmaceutical Ingredients and Traditional Medicine
  1. Research Group for Bioprospecting and Chemoprospecting
  2. Research Group for Chemical Medicine and Artificial Intelligence
  3. Research Group for Natural Resources Bioactivity
  4. Research Group for Natural Products Chemistry
  5. Research Group for Ethnopharmacology and Natural Products Development
  6. Research Group for Pharmacology and Toxicology
  7. Research Group for Standardization of Traditionally Manufactured Medicine
6. Research Center for Vaccine and Drug
  1. Research Group for Adjuvants, Drugs, and Gene Delivery
  2. Research Group for Monoclonal Antibodies
  3. Research Group for Cell Biology and Disease Mechanisms
  4. Research Group for Computer-aided Drug Discovery and Development
  5. Research Group for Insulin Research
  6. Research Group for Marine Natural Products
  7. Research Group for Nanomedicine
  8. Research Group for Stem Cells
  9. Research Group for Vaccine
7. Eijkman Research Center for Molecular Biology
  1. Research Group for Molecular Pathogens
  2. Research Group for Malaria and Vectors Resistance
  3. Research Group for Pathobiology of Emerging Diseases and Infectious Vectors
  4. Research Group for Natural Products Chemistry
  5. Research Group for Human Genetics Diversity and Diseases
  6. Research Group for Structural Biology and Cell Signaling
8. Research Center for Veterinary Science
  1. Research Group for Zoonosis, and Veterinary Emerging, Re-emerging, and Neglected Diseases
  2. Research Group for Animal Diseases and Vectors Detection Development and Control
  3. Research Group for Veterinary Medicine and Vaccine
  4. Research Group for Cattle Health and Veterinary Public Health
  5. Research Group for Veterinary Toxicology and Pathology
  6. Research Group for Aquatic Animal Diseases
  7. Research Group for Veterinary Sciences

== List of heads ==
No.	Head	Took office	Left office	Title
1	Ni Luh Putu Indi Dharmayanti	4 March 2022	Incumbent	Head of OR Kesehatan
