= Research Organization for Life Sciences and Environment =

Indonesian research organization

- Organisasi Riset Ilmu Pengetahuan Hayati dan Lingkungan (ORIPHL/ORHL)

Agency overview
- Formed: 1 September 2021; 1 March 2022 (current form)
- Preceding agencies: Life Sciences Research Organization of National Research and Innovation Agency; FORDA-MOF
- Jurisdiction: Indonesia
- Agency executive: Andes Hamuraby Rozak, Head of ORIPHL
- Parent agency: National Research and Innovation Agency

The Research Organization for Life Sciences and Environment (Indonesian: Organisasi Riset Ilmu Pengetahuan Hayati dan Lingkungan, ORIPHL but also known as ORHL) is one of Research Organizations under the umbrella of the National Research and Innovation Agency (Badan Riset dan Inovasi Nasional, BRIN). It was founded on 1 September 2021 as the Research Organization for Life Sciences (Organisasi Riset Ilmu Pengetahuan Hayati, ORIPH) transformation of Deputy II (Life Sciences) of Indonesian Institute of Sciences (Lembaga Ilmu Pengetahuan Indonesia, LIPI) after the liquidation of LIPI into BRIN.

On 24 January 2022, it was announced that the organization extended with a fusion of the ORIPH with FORDA-MOF of the Ministry of Environment and Forestry, resulting in the formation of ORIPHL. The fusion is expected to turn ORIPH to ORIPHL officially on 1 February 2022. ORIPHL formation is finalized on 1 March 2022 and has been functional since 4 March 2022.

== History ==
Founded on 1 September 2021 as ORIPH, ORIPH was the transformation of Deputy II (Life Sciences) of LIPI after the liquidation of LIPI into BRIN. As research organizations of BRIN, as outlined in Article 175 and Article 176 of Chief of BRIN Decree No. 1/2021, every Research Organization under BRIN is responsible and answers to the Chief of BRIN. It also prescribed that the Research Organizations consisted of Heads of Research Organizations, Centers, and Laboratories/Study Groups. For the transitional period, as Article 210 of Chief of BRIN Decree No. 1/2021 mandated, the structure of ORIPH follows the preceding structure that was the structure of ORIPH follows the preceding structure that already established during its time in LIPI. Due to this, the structure of ORIPH largely follows the Chief of LIPI Decree No. 24/2020. In addition to the preexisting research centers, ORIPH also housed the Eijkman Institute for Molecular Biology after BRIN acquired it on 22 September 2021. The name of Eijkman Institute later changed to Eijkman Molecular Biology Research Center, under the Life Sciences Research Organization of National Research and Innovation Agency. On 22 September 2021, the ORIPH constituting document, Chief of BRIN Decree No. 8/2021, was signed by Laksana Tri Handoko and was finally published on 8 October 2021.

As ORIPH, the organization briefly served as a temporary house of the Eijkman Molecular Biology Research Center. After controversy over Eijkman demotion and split, Eijkman was later restructured by BRIN, but they reorganized and transferred to the Health Research Organization, no longer under ORIPH anymore.

On 24 January 2022, it was announced that the organization extended with a fusion of the former FORDA-MOF. The fusion will officially turn ORIPH to ORIPHL on 1 February 2022. The reorganization also transferred the Eijkman Molecular Biology Research Center to the Health Research Organization.

On 4 March 2022, ORIPHL was fully functional with the inauguration of its first head, Iman Hidayat.

== Structure ==
As the latest Chairman of BRIN Decree No. 9/2025, the structure of ORIPHL is as follows:

1. Office of the Head of ORIPHL
2. Research Center for Genetic Engineering
3. Research Center for Biosystematics and Evolution
4. Research Center for Ecology
5. Research Center for Biotic Systems
6. Research Center for Applied Microbiology
7. Research Center for Applied Zoology
8. Research Center for Applied Botany
9. Research Groups

== List of heads ==
No.	Head	Took office	Left office	Title
1	Iman Hidayat	1 September 2021	4 March 2022	Acting Head of ORIPH
1	Iman Hidayat	4 March 2022	6 July 2024	Head of ORIPHL
2	Andes Hamuraby Rozak	6 July 2024	Incumbent	Head of ORIPHL
