= FORDA-MOF =

Indonesian governmental agency

Forest and Environment Research, Development and Innovation Agency
- Badan Penelitian, Pengembangan, dan Inovasi (BLI)
- Seal of Ministry of Environment and Forestry, used by units and agencies under the Ministry of Environment and Forestry, including BLI

Agency overview
- Formed: 16 May 1913
- Preceding agencies: Het Boswezen van Nederlandsch Oost Indie; Proefstation Voor Het Boswezen; Bosbouwproefstation; Ringyoo Sikenzyoo; Badan Penyelidikan Kehutanan
- Dissolved: 14 September 2020 (de jure); 1 July 2021 (de facto)
- Superseding agencies: Life Sciences and Environmental Research Organization of National Research and Innovation Agency; Environment and Forestry Instrumentation Standardization Agency of Ministry of Environment and Forestry
- Jurisdiction: Indonesia
- Agency executive: Agus Justianto, Director General of BLI/FORDA-MOF
- Parent agency: Ministry of Environment and Forestry

The Forest and Environment Research, Development and Innovation Agency (literal Indonesian: Badan Penelitian, Pengembangan, dan Inovasi Hutan dan Lingkungan Hidup), officially named the Research, Development, and Innovation Agency (Indonesian: Badan Penelitian, Pengembangan, dan Inovasi or BLI) of the Ministry of Environment and Forestry (Indonesian: Kementerian Lingkungan Hidup dan Kehutanan or Kemen LHK), was a supporting unit of the Ministry of Environment and Forestry, responsible for performing research on environmental sciences, climate change, its mitigation, and forestry in Indonesia. The agency was known nationally as BLI, and internationally as FORDA-MOF.

The agency was disbanded and replaced with the National Research and Innovation Agency (Indonesian: Badan Riset dan Inovasi Nasional or BRIN). The agency had been disbanded de jure after the issuance of Presidential Decree No. 92/2020 on 14 September, 2020, which ordered the research units of BLI/FORDA-MOF to be relinquished to BRIN, and a large part of the agency to be converted into the Environment and Forestry Instrumentation Standardization Agency (Indonesian: Badan Standarisasi Instrumen Lingkungan Hidup dan Kehutanan or BSI LHK). Despite that, the transitional provision of the decree permitted the research centers under the former BLI/FORDA-MOF to be temporarily operated and supervised by BSI LHK until the integration to BRIN was finalized. On 1 July, 2021, the agency was confirmed to be dissolved de facto and was replaced by BSI LHK through the Ministry of Environment and Forestry Decree No. 15/2021.

== History ==
=== Foundation ===
The foundation of BLI can be traced back to late 19th century during the Dutch colonial era. On 1 July, 1897, the Forest Service of Netherlands West Indies Government (Dutch: Het Boswezen van Nederlandsch Oost Indie) was founded, as one of the 16 child agencies of the Dutch colonial government's Departement van Landbouw, Nijverheid en Handel (Department of Agriculture, Industry, and Trade). This department was the colonial predecessor of the current Indonesian Ministry of Agriculture, Ministry of Industry, and Ministry of Trade. The department was, at that time, a large quasi-governmental agency within the Dutch colonial government, which possessed vast powers and responsibilities. It regulated, provided, and researched various subjects in agriculture, agricultural extension, agricultural education, management of the Bogor Botanical Gardens, fishery, husbandry, ranch and pasture management, veterinary services and education, state coffee plantations, forestry, industries, trades and metrology. It also managed and coordinated local government agricultural services and units, as well as the control, supervision, regulation, and registration of Dutch East Indies natural societies. The Forest Service was a unit founded within the department to regulate and manage Indonesian forests, although activity was focused on forests on Java and Madura. However, forestry at that time was used by the colonial government as a tool for exploiting natural resources and their activities were very industry-oriented. Despite that, the agency's research in hydrology, orology, and climatology contributed to early research on these topics, which later became the foundational basis of earth sciences and environmental sciences in Indonesia.

=== Colonial history ===
On 16 May, 1913, the Proefstation Voor Het Boswezen (Forestry Research Station) was formed within Het Boswezen van Nederlandsch Oost Indie through Gouvernement Besluit (Government Decree) No. 58. The unit was initially consisted of 4 research centers: the Forestry Research Division, the Plantation Division, the Forest Exploration and Prospecting Division, and the Wood Technology Division. In 1927, the Proefstation Voor Het Boswezen was renamed to Bosbouwproefstation (Forestry Research Station). The agency expanded throughout the colonial era and finally had six divisions: the Wild Forest Wood Business Division, the Forest Exploration Station, the Experimental Forest Products Development Division, the Forest Plants Experimental Division, the Water Research Division, and the Propaganda for Forest Products Utilization and Promotion Division.

In 1942, during World War II, Japan occupied the Dutch East Indies. At that time, the Empire of Japan's government sent Professor Ryozo Kanehira to the Dutch East Indies and set him up as Director of Bosbouwproefstation. The Bosbouwproefstation was renamed Japanese: 林業試験場, romanized: Ringyo Shikenjo (Forestry Research Station) under his leadership.

During his time, the agency's research was shifted to war purposes and researching wood technologies for supporting war. This included techniques for using teak in ship repair, the development of gunpowder and explosives, inventorying wood species for use in shipbuilding, airplane building, gunpowder, charcoal and match production, inventorying trees that produced tannins, and techniques for gun manufacture using wood, leather and fruit.

When Japan finally surrendered on 15 August 1945, the agency was relinquished to the Indonesian government on 17 August, 1945, the same day as the Indonesian Proclamation of Independence.

=== Post-independence ===
The first Indonesian director was M. Soetarmo Hardjowarsono, who renamed the agency Badan Penyelidikan Kehutanan (Forestry Research Agency).

The agency later went through many names and was attached to many ministries until, in 2015, it became the Badan Penelitian, Pengembangan, dan Inovasi (Research, Development, and Innovation Agency) or BLI, after the issue of Ministry of Environment and Forestry Decree No. P. 18/MENLHK-II/2015.

=== Dissolution ===
After the passage of the Law of National Science and Technology System (Law No. 11/2019) and the Omnibus Law on Job Creation (Law No. 11/2020), Siti Nurbaya Bakar, the Minister of Environment and Forestry announced, on 16 July, 2020, that the BLI would be phased out. The research units of BLI would be relinquished to the newly formed BRIN, and a large part of the former BLI would turn into BSI LHK. On 14 September, 2020, the agency was dissolved de jure by Presidential Decree No. 92/2020 and replaced by BSI LHK. The ministry confirmed the dissolution again through Ministry of Environment and Forestry Decree No. 15/2021.

=== Integration to BRIN ===
Despite the dissolution, the transitional provision of the decree permitted the research centers of the former BLI/FORDA-MOF to be temporarily operated and supervised by BSI LHK, until the integration to BRIN finalized. As of 2021, the integration progress is still ongoing.

== Structure ==
The Structure of the agency was outlined by Ministry of Environment and Forestry Decree No. P. 18/MENLHK-II/2015:

1. Office of the Head of BLI
2. BLI Secretariat
  1. Division of Programs and Cooperation
    1. Subdivision of Programs
    2. Subdivision of Financial Planning
    3. Subdivision of Cooperation
  2. Division of Evaluation, Dissemination, and Book Affairs
    1. Subdivision of Data and Information
    2. Subdivision of Evaluation and Reporting
    3. Subdivision of Dissemination, Publication, and Library Affairs
  3. Division of Employee, Law, Organization, and Administration Affairs
    1. Subdivision of Employee Administration
    2. Subdivision of Functionaries Affairs
    3. Subdivision of Law, Organization, and Administration Affairs
  4. Division of Finance and General Affairs
    1. Subdivision of Administration Affairs
    2. Subdivision of Financial Administration Affairs
    3. Subdivision of Equipment
3. Center for Forestry Research and Development
4. Center for Forest Product Research and Development
5. Center for Environmental Quality Development and Environmental Laboratories Research and Development
6. Center for Social, Economy, Policies and Climate Change Research and Development

Besides these centers, the agency has several branch units. After the BLI/FORDA-MOF dissolution, these units were temporarily under BSI LHK.

1. Research and Development Institute of Forest Plants Fiber Technology, based in Kuok, Riau.
2. Research and Development Institute of Agroforestry Technology, based in Ciamis, West Java.
3. Research and Development Institute of Biotechnology Research and Plant Breeding, based in Yogyakarta.
4. Research and Development Institute of Watershed Management and Technology Development, based in Solo, Central Java.
5. Research and Development Institute of Environment and Forestry, based in Banjarbaru, South Kalimantan.
6. Research and Development Institute of Natural Resources Conservation Technology, based in Samboja, East Kalimantan.
7. Research and Development Institute of Dipterocarps Rainforest Ecosystem, based in Samarinda, East Kalimantan.
8. Research and Development Institute of Technology for Non-timber Forest Product, based in Mataram, West Nusa Tenggara.
9. Research and Development Institute for Environment and Forestry, based in Aek Nauli, North Sumatra.
10. Research and Development Institute for Environment and Forestry, based in Palembang, South Sumatra.
11. Research and Development Institute for Environment and Forestry, based in Makassar, South Sulawesi.
12. Research and Development Institute for Environment and Forestry, based in Kupang, East Nusa Tenggara.
13. Research and Development Institute for Environment and Forestry, based in Manado, North Sulawesi.
14. Research and Development Institute for Environment and Forestry, based in Manokwari, West Papua.
