= Agency for Agricultural Assemblies and Modernization =

Government agency of Indonesia

- Badan Perakitan dan Modernisasi Pertanian
- Seal of Ministry of Agriculture, used by units and agencies under the Ministry of Agriculture, including BrMP

Agency overview
- Formed: 21 September 2022 (as BSIP); 8 November 2024 (as BrMP)
- Jurisdiction: Indonesia
- Employees: 4170 (2025)
- Agency executive: Fadjry Djufry, Head of Agency for Agricultural Assemblies and Modernization
- Parent agency: Ministry of Agriculture
- Website: brmp.pertanian.go.id

The Agency for Agricultural Assemblies and Modernization (Indonesian: Badan Perakitan dan Modernisasi Pertanian, officially abbreviated as BrMP), formerly Agricultural Instruments Standardization Agency (Indonesian: Badan Standardisasi Instrumen Pertanian, BSIP), is the supporting unit of the Ministry of Agriculture which is responsible for the engineering, assembly, testing, dissemination, and application of modern agriculture in Indonesia. When it was established as BSIP, the agency was formerly tasked to establish state standards for developing products and innovation in the field of agriculture in Indonesia.

== History ==
The Indonesian Agency for Agricultural Research and Development (Indonesian: Badan Penelitian dan Pengembangan Pertanian, Balitbangtan) was the research arm of the Ministry of Agriculture until it formally dissolved on 21 September 2022 by Presidential Decree No. 117/2022. As a replacement, BSIP was formed within the Ministry of Agriculture as an agricultural regulatory and standardization agency. At the time of the dissolution of Balitbangtan, some of the Balitbangtan researchers transferred to the National Research and Innovation Agency (Indonesian: Badan Riset dan Inovasi Nasional, BRIN) and placed under the Research Organization for Agriculture and Food (Indonesian: Organisasi Riset Pertanian dan Pangan, ORPP). Around 3000 staff, including administrators and researchers, chose to remain in Balitbangtan. The remaining part of Balitbangtan became the BSIP. While around 1300 Balitbangtan researchers and engineers moved to BRIN.

On 8 November 2024, BSIP was dissolved and replaced by the BrMP by Presidential Decree No. 192/2024. The Presidential Decree relinquished agricultural standardization functions formerly tasked to BSIP to the responsible Directorate Generals within the Ministry of Agriculture. However, the research and engineering functions formerly owned by the agency during the Balitbangtan period were partly revived. According to the Ministry of Agriculture, only 25% of the research functions of the original Balitbangtan are restored in the BrMP but with a higher level of advanced technologies and applications than the ORPP, as ORPP performed much of the basic agricultural research.

== BrMP - BRIN Relations ==
On 25 June 2024, there was request from DPR to return 1200 remaining former Balitbangtan researchers and engineers from BRIN to then BSIP to return the former researchers back to their original laboratories under the Ministry of Agriculture because massive neglect of Ministry of Agriculture labs and genetic resources facilities that will result in massive waste on biological collection of the former Balitbangtan. The request also repeated in December 2024.

Not only from legislators, even from the executive ministers also voiced return of research functions of original Balitbangtan to current BrMP citing BRIN lack of supporting research facilities for agricultural research.

On 9 June 2026, Minister of Agriculture Amran Sulaiman and Chairman of BRIN Arif Satria signed MoU that allow all BRIN researchers to utilize all of Ministry of Agriculture research labs and genetic resources facilities for free access and free of charge. Minister Amran also pledged around 40 trillion rupiahs to be allocated for agricultural research and farmer fostering programs.

== Major Structural Changes ==
=== Institutional Development ===
On 18 December 2025, due to changes in province numbers in Indonesia become 38, thru Ministry of Agriculture Decree No. 37/2025, the organization of BrMP updated with formation of these agricultural engineering institutes:

- East Kalimantan Institute for Application of Agricultural Modernization, Samarinda split into 2:
  - East Kalimantan Institute for Application of Agricultural Modernization, Samarinda (itself)
  - North Kalimantan Institute for Application of Agricultural Modernization, Bulungan
- West Papua Institute for Application of Agricultural Modernization, Manokwari, split into 4:
  - West Papua Institute for Application of Agricultural Modernization, Manokwari (itself)
  - Central Papua Station for Application of Agricultural Modernization, Nabire
  - Highland Papua Station for Application of Agricultural Modernization, Wamena
  - Southwest Papua Station for Application of Agricultural Modernization, Sorong
- Papua Institute for Application of Agricultural Modernization, Jayapura, split into 2:
  - Papua Institute for Application of Agricultural Modernization, Jayapura (itself)
  - South Papua Institute for Application of Agricultural Modernization, Merauke

On 30 December 2025, by issuance of Ministry of Agriculture Decree No. 39/2025, all provincial branches of BrMP being pulled out from Indonesian Center for Development and Application of Agricultural Modernization, Bogor coordination and being placed directly under the head of BrMP. Except novel branches in North Kalimantan, Central Papua, Highland Papua, Southwest Papua, and South Papua that retained their echelon designation, all older provincial branches of BrMP are elevated from Balai (Institute-level) to Balai Besar (Center-level).

On 18 May 2026, by issuance of Ministry of Agriculture Decree No. 12/2026, all remaining testing stations except in Southwest Papua, Central Papua, and Highlands Papua elevated to Balai (Institute-level). In addition, Indonesian Center for Development of Agricultural Modern Systems replaced Indonesian Center for Development and Application of Agricultural Modernization.

=== Return of research mandate ===
Research mandate of former Balitbangtan also gradually returned to BrMP by Ministry of Agriculture Decree Nos. 37/2025 and 39/2025. By these decrees, several units of BrMP currently possess research functions again, not only just testing and/or establish state standards for developing agriculture products and innovation when the agency turned into BSIP. Several BrMP units that regained its research functions are:

- Indonesian Agricultural Assemblies and Modernization Center for Agricultural Post-Harvest, Tangerang (by Ministry of Agriculture Decree No. 37/2025)
- Indonesian Agricultural Assemblies and Modernization Center for Agricultural Biotechnology and Genetic Resources, Bogor (by Ministry of Agriculture Decree No. 39/2025)

By Ministry of Agriculture Decree No. 12/2026, now research mandate of BrMP fully returned. On 9 June 2026, the ministry allowed all BRIN researchers to be posted and utilize all of Ministry of Agriculture research labs and genetic resources facilities for free access and free of charge.

== Organization Structure ==
According to Ministry of Agriculture Decree No. 02/2025 and Ministry of Agriculture Decree No. 12/2026, the agency is structured as follows:

- Office of the Head of Agency for Agricultural Assemblies and Modernization
  - Indonesian Agricultural Assemblies and Modernization Center for Agricultural Mechanics, Tangerang
  - Indonesian Agricultural Assemblies and Modernization Center for Agricultural Post-Harvest, Tangerang
  - Indonesian Agricultural Assemblies and Modernization Center for Agricultural Biotechnology and Genetic Resources, Bogor
  - Indonesian Center for Development of Agricultural Modern Systems, Bogor
  - Aceh Center for Application of Agricultural Modernization, Banda Aceh
  - North Sumatera Center for Application of Agricultural Modernization, Medan
  - West Sumatera Center for Application of Agricultural Modernization, Solok
  - Riau Center for Application of Agricultural Modernization, Pekanbaru
  - Jambi Center for Application of Agricultural Modernization, Kotabaru
  - South Sumatera Center for Application of Agricultural Modernization, Palembang
  - Bengkulu Center for Application of Agricultural Modernization, Bengkulu
  - Lampung Center for Application of Agricultural Modernization, Bandar Lampung
  - Bangka Belitung Islands Center for Application of Agricultural Modernization, Pangkal Pinang
  - Riau Island Center for Application of Agricultural Modernization, Tanjung Pinang
  - Jakarta Center for Application of Agricultural Modernization, South Jakarta
  - West Java Center for Application of Agricultural Modernization, Lembang
  - Central Java Center for Application of Agricultural Modernization, Ungaran
  - Yogyakarta Center for Application of Agricultural Modernization, Yogyakarta
  - East Java Center for Application of Agricultural Modernization, Malang
  - Banten Center for Application of Agricultural Modernization, Serang
  - Bali Center for Application of Agricultural Modernization, Denpasar
  - West Nusa Tenggara Center for Application of Agricultural Modernization, Mataram
  - East Nusa Tenggara Center for Application of Agricultural Modernization, Kupang
  - West Kalimantan Center for Application of Agricultural Modernization, Pontianak
  - Central Kalimantan Center for Application of Agricultural Modernization, Palangkaraya
  - South Kalimantan Center for Application of Agricultural Modernization, Banjarbaru
  - East Kalimantan Center for Application of Agricultural Modernization, Samarinda
  - North Kalimantan Institute for Application of Agricultural Modernization, Bulungan
  - North Sulawesi Center for Application of Agricultural Modernization, Manado
  - Central Sulawesi Center for Application of Agricultural Modernization, Palu
  - South Sulawesi Center for Application of Agricultural Modernization, Makassar
  - Southeast Sulawesi Center for Application of Agricultural Modernization, Kendari
  - Gorontalo Center for Application of Agricultural Modernization, Gorontalo
  - West Sulawesi Center for Application of Agricultural Modernization, Mamuju
  - Maluku Center for Application of Agricultural Modernization, Ambon
  - North Maluku Center for Application of Agricultural Modernization, Ternate Selatan
  - West Papua Center for Application of Agricultural Modernization, Manokwari
  - Central Papua Station for Application of Agricultural Modernization, Nabire
  - Highland Papua Station for Application of Agricultural Modernization, Wamena
  - Southwest Papua Station for Application of Agricultural Modernization, Sorong
  - Papua Center for Application of Agricultural Modernization, Jayapura
  - South Papua Institute for Application of Agricultural Modernization, Merauke
- Office of the Secretary of Agency for Agricultural Assemblies and Modernization
  - Management Center for Agricultural Assemblies and Modernization Utilization, Bogor
- Center for Agricultural Assemblies and Modernization of Food Crops, Bogor
  - Indonesian Agricultural Assemblies and Modernization Center for Rice, Subang
  - Indonesian Agricultural Assemblies and Testing Institute for Legumes, Malang
  - Indonesian Agricultural Assemblies and Testing Institute for Cereals, Maros
  - Indonesian Agricultural Assemblies and Testing Station for Tuber Crops, Sidenreng Rappang
- Center for Agricultural Assemblies and Modernization of Horticulture, Bogor
  - Indonesian Agricultural Assemblies and Testing Institute for Vegetables, West Bandung
  - Indonesian Agricultural Assemblies and Testing Institute for Tropical Fruits, Solok
  - Indonesian Agricultural Assemblies and Testing Institute for Ornamental Plants, Cianjur
  - Indonesian Agricultural Assemblies and Testing Institute for Citrus and Subtropical Fruits, Batu
- Center for Agricultural Assemblies and Modernization of Plantations, Bogor
  - Indonesian Agricultural Assemblies and Testing Institute for Spices, Medicinal Plants, and Aromatics, Bogor
  - Indonesian Agricultural Assemblies and Testing Institute for Industrial Crops and Freshener Crops, Sukabumi
  - Indonesian Agricultural Assemblies and Testing Institute for Sweeteners and Fiber Crops, Malang
  - Indonesian Agricultural Assemblies and Testing Institute for Palms, North Minahasa
- Center for Agricultural Assemblies and Modernization of Animal Husbandry and Veterinary, Bogor
  - Indonesian Agricultural Assemblies and Modernization Center for Veterinary, Bogor
  - Indonesian Agricultural Assemblies and Testing Institute for Fowls and Cattles, Bogor
  - Indonesian Agricultural Assemblies and Testing Institute for Large Ruminants, Pasuruan
  - Indonesian Agricultural Assemblies and Testing Institute for Small Ruminants, Deli Serdang
- Indonesian Agricultural Assemblies and Modernization Center for Agricultural Land Resources, Bogor
  - Indonesian Agricultural Assemblies and Testing Institute for Land and Fertilizers, Bogor
  - Indonesian Agricultural Assemblies and Testing Institute for Agricultural Environment, Pati
  - Indonesian Agricultural Assemblies and Testing Institute for Wetland Agriculture, Banjarbaru
  - Indonesian Agricultural Assemblies and Testing Institute for Agroclimatic and Hydrology, Bogor
