= Iman Hidayat =

Indonasian scientist (born 1978)

Acting Head of Life Sciences Research Organization
- Incumbent
- Assumed office 1 September 2021
- Preceded by: Agus Haryono (as Head of Indonesian Institute of Sciences)

Personal details
- Born: Iman Hidayat; 19 January 1978 (age 48) Bandung, West Java, Indonesia
- Education: Padjadjaran University (B.Sc); Chiang Mai University (Ph.D.)

Iman Hidayat (born 19 January 1978, in Bandung) is an Indonesian scientist and public official specialized in mycology, microbiology, and plant pathology. Prior his appointment as Acting Head of the Life Sciences Research Organization (Indonesian: Organisasi Riset Ilmu Pengetahuan Hayati, ORIPH), he was a researcher at Research Center for Biomaterial, Indonesian Institutes of Sciences since 1 December 2002. He completed his bachelor's degree in biology at Faculty of Mathematics and Natural Sciences, Padjadjaran University in 2002, and his doctoral degree in Plant Pathology at Faculty of Agriculture, Chiang Mai University in 2009. During his time as researcher, he completed various courses on ascomycetes taxonomy, plant pathological microorganisms, and molecular phylogenetics.

He was appointed as Acting Head of ORIPH since 1 September 2021.
