= Directorate General of Nature Resources and Ecosystem Conservation (Indonesia) =

Government agency of Indonesia

Directorate General of Biodiversity Conservation
- Direktorat Jenderal Konservasi Sumber Daya Alam dan Ekosistem
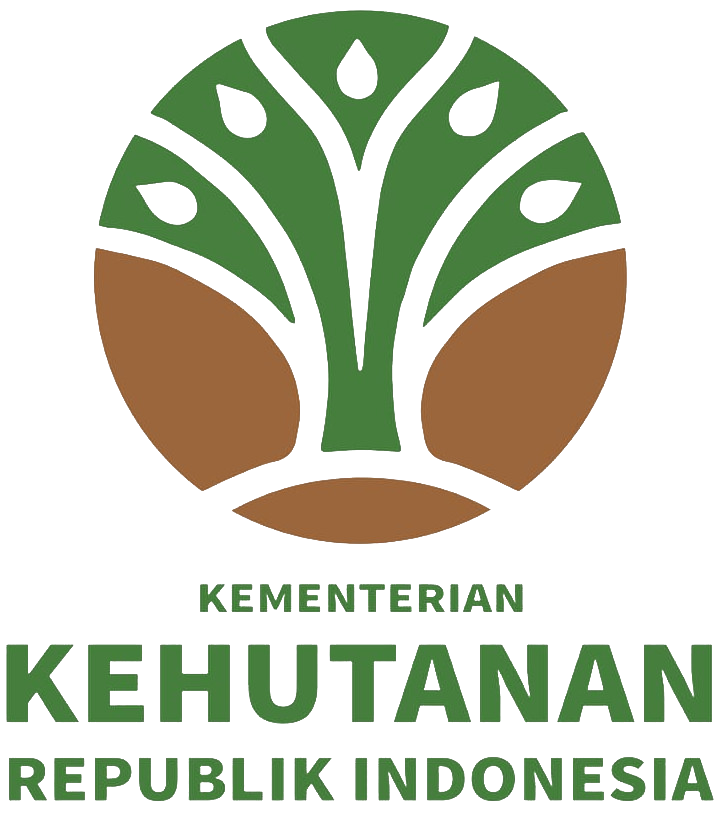

Agency overview
- Jurisdiction: Government of Indonesia
- Headquarters: Gedung Manggala Wanabakti Block I, 8th Floor Jalan Jenderal Gatot Subroto Jakarta Pusat 10270 Jakarta, Indonesia
- Agency executives: Wiratno, Director General (2017-2022); Satyawan Pudyatmoko, Director General (2023-now)
- Parent Agency: Ministry of Forestry
- Website: ksdae.kehutanan.go.id

The Directorate General of Biodiversity Conservation (Indonesian: Direktorat Jenderal Konservasi Sumber Daya Alam dan Ekosistem, also known as Direktorat Jenderal KSDAE) is a directorate general under the Ministry of Environment and Forestry of the Republic of Indonesia. Its tasks and functions include planning and implementation of policy in the field of forest protection and biodiversity conservation, including forest protection, forest fire, protected area management, wildlife conservation, ecosystem restoration, OECMs/habitat corridor preservation, and natural recreation and environment. This conservation scheme was designed to benefit those local communities which neighbour Indonesian forestry and to help the most endangered species living in these threatened habitats.

Prior to 2015, it was named Directorate General of Forest Protection and Nature Conservation (Direktorat Jenderal Perlindungan Hutan dan Konservasi Alam – PHKA). Its current name was taken into effect due to the merger of Ministry of Environment and Ministry of Forestry in 2014.
