= Research Organization for Agriculture and Food =

Indonesian research organisation

- Organisasi Riset Pertanian dan Pangan (ORPP)

Agency overview
- Formed: 1 March 2022
- Preceding agency: Indonesian Agency for Agricultural Research and Development of Ministry of Agriculture
- Jurisdiction: Indonesia
- Agency executive: Puji Lestari, Head of ORPP
- Parent agency: National Research and Innovation Agency

The Research Organization for Agriculture and Food (Indonesian: Organisasi Riset Pertanian dan Pangan, ORPP) is one of Research Organizations under the umbrella of the National Research and Innovation Agency (Badan Riset dan Inovasi Nasional, BRIN). The organization is transformation of Indonesian Agency for Agricultural Research and Development (Badan Penelitian dan Pengembangan Pertanian, Balitbangtan) of Ministry of Agriculture (Kementerian Pertanian, Kementan). On 24 January 2022, it is announced that the organization expected to be formed on 1 February 2022. ORPP formation is finalized on 1 March 2022 and is functional since 4 March 2022 with inauguration of its first head, Puji Lestari.

== Structure ==
As the latest Chairman of BRIN Decree No. 11/2025, the structure of ORPP is as follows:

1. Office of the Head of ORPP
2. Research Center for Food Technology and Processing
3. Research Center for Food Crops
4. Research Center for Horticulture
5. Research Center for Estate Crops
6. Research Center for Animal Husbandry
7. Research Center for Marine Aquaculture
8. Research Center for Freshwater Aquaculture
9. Research Groups

== List of heads ==
No.	Head	Took office	Left office	Title
1	Puji Lestari	4 March 2022	Incumbent	Head of ORPP
