= Satyawan Pudyatmoko =

Indonesian forester (born 1971)

Chief of the National Peatland and Mangrove Management Agency
- Incumbent
- Assumed office 15 October 2026
- President: Prabowo Subianto
- Deputy: Sriyanto
- Preceded by: Hartono Prawiraatmadja (as Chief of the Peatland and Mangrove Restoration Agency)

Director General of Natural Resources Conservation and Ecosystem
- In office 2 May 2023 – 15 October 2026
- Preceded by: Wiratno; Bambang Hendroyono (acting)

Deputy for Planning and Evaluation, Peatland and Mangrove Restoration Agency
- In office 9 April 2021 – 2 May 2023

Personal details
- Born: 9 August 1971 (age 55) Boyolali, Central Java, Indonesia
- Children: 3
- Education: Gadjah Mada University (S.Hut., Prof. Ir.); University of Göttingen (M.Sc., Dr.)

Academic background
- Thesis: Field studies on the ecology and habitat use of wild bantengrinder (Bos javanicus d'Alton 1823) in Baluran National Park in East Java, Indonesia (2005)

Academic work
- Discipline: Forestry
- Sub-discipline: Wildlife management Forest management

Satyawan Pudyatmoko (born 9 August 1971) is an Indonesian forester that is currently serving as the chief of the National Peatland and Mangrove agency since 15 October 2026. A professor of forestry in the Gadjah Mada University (UGM), Satyawan held a number of academic positions within the university, including as the dean of UGM's forestry faculty from 2012 to 2016, before transitioning to the government. He held senior executive roles in the Peatland and Mangrove Restoration Agency and the Ministry of Forestry and Environment prior to his current appointment.

== Early life and education ==
Born on 9 August 1971 in Boyolali, Satyawan graduated in forestry from UGM in 1995. He continued further studies at the University of Göttingen with scholarship from the German Academic Exchange Service, receiving his master's degree in tropical forestry in 2001 and his doctorate in 2005. His researches for the final assignments of his degrees were entirely conducted at the Baluran National Park, with focus on plant communities for his bachelor's degree, kingfishers for his master's degree and on banteng for his doctorate.

== Career ==
Satyawan began teaching at UGM's forestry faculty after obtaining his doctorate, lecturing on wildlife management and forest conservation. Aside from his teaching duties, Satyawan conducted research activities at Baluran and Mount Merapi, as well as on the conservation of endangered Sumatran tiger and Sumatran elephants. He was a member of the International Union of Forest Research Organizations and the IUCN SSC Afro- Asian Wild Cattle Specialist Group, and chaired the Association of Indonesian Climate Change and Forestry Experts with 300 subject expert members. Within his faculty, Satyawan was the head of the wildlife laboratory and chaired the forest resources conservation major. He was appointed as the faculty's deputy dean for research, business development, student, and alumni relations in 2008, where he oversaw a field research program conducted by international students from the University of Göttingen at UGM's campus forest.

Satyawan was elected by the faculty's academic senate as its dean on 31 September 2012, with 43 votes out of 75 in the second round of election. He was installed along with deans from other UGM faculties on 8 October 2012. During this period, Satyawan continued his academic activities, where he blamed the recurring forest fires in Indonesia's islands of Kalimantan and Sumatra on land mismanagement and encouraged the government to be more selective in issuing forest management permits. Satyawan's term ended on 7 October 2016. He was promoted to a full professorship in wildlife on 25 February 2020, with his inaugural speech discussing human-wildlife relations. Satyawan received his professional engineering degree (Ir.) on 12 July 2022, earning the distinction as the best graduate of his cohort with a GPA of 3.96.

On 9 April 2021, Satyawan took office as deputy for planning and evaluation in the Peatland and Mangrove Restoration Agency. Satyawan was the first official to occupy the post since the agency was formed in 2020 as a merger of the Peat Restoration Agency and the Mangrove Restoration Team. In 2022, Satyawan announced his plans to conduct inter-agency data agency as means to accelerate mangrove rehabilitation, and pointed out the huge amount of cost required and the low rate of success in mangrove rehabilitation. During Indonesia's G20 presidency, Satyawan highlighted a number of achievements the agency has made, including the Bali Ngurah Rai People's Forest Park, which was formed by rehabilitating former pond to a mangrove forest.

Satyawan at the inauguration of the Tengger Caldera Ring Route, 2026

Satyawan was installed as the director general of natural resources conservation and ecosystem within the ministry of forestry and environment on 2 May 2023. On 24 September 2026, following a meeting with academics specializing in peatland, Prabowo approved the establishment of the National Peatland and Mangrove Management Agency. Its predecessor, the Peatland and Mangrove Restoration Agency was dissolved by Prabowo a year prior, with its responsibilities being distributed to different ministries. Unlike its predecessor agency, which was under the forestry ministry, the new agency was to be directly responsible to the president. On 12 October 2026, shortly after a meeting on the handling of the ongoing forest fire crisis, coordinating minister for politics and security Dudung Abdurachman announced Satyawan as the president's nominee for the head of the agency. Satyawan was installed three days later, on 15 October, along with his deputy Sriyanto.

== Personal life ==
Satyawan is married and has two daughters and a son.
