= Indonesian Agency for Agricultural Research and Development =

Government agency of Indonesia

- Badan Penelitian dan Pengembangan Pertanian
- Seal of Ministry of Agriculture, used by units and agencies under the Ministry of Agriculture, including Balitbangtan

Agency overview
- Formed: 26 August 1974
- Dissolved: 21 September 2022
- Superseding agencies: Research Organization for Agriculture and Food of the National Research and Innovation Agency; Agricultural Instruments Standardization Agency of the Ministry of Agriculture
- Jurisdiction: Indonesia
- Agency executive: Fadjry Jufry, Head of Indonesian Agency for Agricultural Research and Development
- Parent agency: Ministry of Agriculture
- Website: https://www.litbang.pertanian.go.id/ (Indonesian) https://en.litbang.pertanian.go.id/ (English)

The Indonesian Agency for Agricultural Research and Development (Indonesian: Badan Penelitian dan Pengembangan Pertanian, abbreviated as Balitbangtan) abbreviated in English as IAARD was a supporting unit of the Ministry of Agriculture which is responsible for state research, development, and innovation in the field of agriculture in Indonesia.

== History ==
=== Formation ===
The agency was founded by President Suharto, on 26 August 1974 through issuance of Presidential Decision No. 45/1974. There were eleven research and development agencies founded by this Decision.

=== Dissolution ===
During the hearing with Commission IV of People's Representative Council on 25 August 2021, Syahrul Yasin Limpo, Minister of Agriculture expressed his concern about the future BRIN plan of liquidation of ministerial research agencies and turning the agency to become part of BRIN. The Ministry of Agriculture's Balitbangtan is one of ministerial research agencies targeted to be liquidated and fused into BRIN. While the agency's performances are largely not known at large and publicly known as other research agencies, Indonesian Agency for Agricultural Research and Development is a much larger research agency with established networks of state agriculture research institutes responsible with state agricultural research activities with more than 707.4 million hectares under their responsibility, and possessed large manpower powering it even larger than all Indonesian Institute of Science manpower totaled. Endang S. Thohari, former Ministry of Agriculture scientist and one of founder of Balitbangtan who is currently a Gerindra politician sitting in Commission IV also lamented the government decision to liquidate the agency she founded with Indonesian agricultural scientists. In the hearing, Limpo asked the support of the Commission IV to spare Balitbangtan from the liquidation, or if even it is liquidated, only parts of basic research divisions are relinquished to BRIN, while specialized agricultural research are still performed by Balitbangtan.

Earlier on 20 August 2021, Research Professor Communication Forum of Balitbangtan also voiced the same concern. Tahlim Sudaryanto, Agriculture professor and Head of Research Professor Communication Forum of Balitbangtan submitted the report compiled by the forum to the Ministry of State Apparatus Utilization and Bureaucratic Reform and Ministry of State Secretariat. In the report, the forum performed analysis and concluded that it is very hard to fuse such a large Balitbangtan to BRIN body smoothly without disturbance. The forum offered two options that are possible: (1) soft integration, and (2) partial integration. If soft integration is chosen, BRIN will lack power to control Balitbangtan, as Balitbangtan is still attached to the Ministry of Agriculture, but Balitbangtan programs and funding are controlled and supervised by BRIN. While the option is not advantageous to BRIN, the option is to strengthen BRIN and Balitbangtan in collaboration to succeeding National Plan of National Research Priorities of the 2020–2024 period. If partial integration is chosen, part of Balitbangtan would be relinquished to BRIN, and what remained of Balitbangtan will be reformed into a non-research institution under the Ministry of Agriculture with tasks and assignments to be determined in the future. While this option is advantageous to BRIN, the execution of the option must not be rushed and pushed into a fixed 31 December 2022 deadline as mandated in the Circular No. B/295/M.SM.02.03/2021. The report also urged the government to change their deadline on liquidation if the second option is chosen.

On 21 September 2021, the Ministry of Agriculture set up plans to disband their own Balitbangtan despite previous ministry reluctance to disband it and relinquished all the units from Balitbangtan to BRIN. As replacement of Balitbangtan, the ministry set up the new agency tentatively named "Agricultural Standardization and System Agency" (Indonesian: Badan Standardisasi dan Sistem Pertanian, BSSP) at that time, a regulatory and standardization agency. Along with Balitbangtan disbandment, parts of the Ministry's Food Security Agency are also relinquished to BRIN, while other parts are expected to become an embryo of another agency, the National Food Agency.

The Balitbangtan formally dissolved on 21 September 2022 by Presidential Decree No. 117/2022. As replacement, Agricultural Instrumentation Standardization Agency (Indonesian: Badan Standardisasi Instrumentasi Pertanian, BSIP) formed within the Ministry of Agriculture as agricultural regulatory and standardization agency. The research arms of Balitbangtan were relinquished to National Research and Innovation Agency and transformed into Research Organization for Agriculture and Food previously on 1 March 2022.

== Structure ==
Based from the latest constituting document of Balitbangtan, Ministry of Agriculture Decree No.44/2020, Balitbangtan consists of extensive state laboratories and institutes under its umbrella. Balitbangtan consisted with 1 Office of the Head, 1 Agency Secretariat, and 5 Divisions. In total, there are 59 institutes under Balitbangtan umbrella and scattered to 27 branches of Balitbangtan. Aside of these institutes, Balitbangtan also has more than 100 laboratories, experimental stations, animal stations, pastures, and research facilities scattered across 34 provinces of Indonesia.

1. Office of the Head of Balitbangtan
  1. Indonesian Center for Agricultural Biotechnology and Genetic Resource Research and Development, Bogor BB Biogen
  2. Indonesian Center for Agricultural Post Harvest Research and Development, Bogor
  3. Indonesian Center for Agricultural Engineering Research and Development, Tangerang
  4. Indonesian Center for Agricultural Technology Assessment and Development, Bogor
    1. Aceh Assessment Institute for Agricultural Technology, Banda Aceh
    2. North Sumatera Assessment Institute for Agricultural Technology, Medan
    3. West Sumatera Assessment Institute for Agricultural Technology, Solok
    4. Riau Assessment Institute for Agricultural Technology, Pekanbaru
    5. Jambi Assessment Institute for Agricultural Technology, Kotabaru
    6. South Sumatera Assessment Institute for Agricultural Technology, Palembang
    7. Bengkulu Assessment Institute for Agricultural Technology, Bengkulu
    8. Lampung Assessment Institute for Agricultural Technology, Bandar Lampung
    9. Kepulauan Bangka Belitung Assessment Institute for Agricultural Technology, Pangkal Pinang
    10. Riau Island Assessment Institute for Agricultural Technology, Tanjung Pinang
    11. Jakarta Assessment Institute for Agricultural Technology, South Jakarta
    12. West Java Assessment Institute for Agricultural Technology, Lembang
    13. Central Java Assessment Institute for Agricultural Technology, Ungaran
    14. Yogyakarta Assessment Institute for Agricultural Technology, Yogyakarta
    15. East Java Assessment Institute for Agricultural Technology, Malang
    16. Banten Assessment Institute for Agricultural Technology, Serang
    17. Bali Assessment Institute for Agricultural Technology, Denpasar
    18. West Nusa Tenggara Assessment Institute for Agricultural Technology, Mataram
    19. East Nusa Tenggara Assessment Institute for Agricultural Technology, Kupang
    20. West Kalimantan Assessment Institute for Agricultural Technology, Pontianak
    21. Central Kalimantan Assessment Institute for Agricultural Technology, Palangkaraya
    22. South Kalimantan Assessment Institute for Agricultural Technology, Banjarbaru
    23. East Kalimantan Assessment Institute for Agricultural Technology, Samarinda
    24. North Sulawesi Assessment Institute for Agricultural Technology, Manado
    25. Central Sulawesi Assessment Institute for Agricultural Technology, Palu
    26. South Sulawesi Assessment Institute for Agricultural Technology, Makassar
    27. South East Sulawesi Assessment Institute for Agricultural Technology, Kendari
    28. Gorontalo Assessment Institute for Agricultural Technology, Gorontalo
    29. West Sulawesi Assessment Institute for Agricultural Technology, Mamuju
    30. Maluku Assessment Institute for Agricultural Technology, Ambon
    31. North Maluku Assessment Institute for Agricultural Technology, Ternate Selatan
    32. West Papua Assessment Institute for Agricultural Technology, Manokwari
    33. Papua Assessment Institute for Agricultural Technology, Jayapura
2. Office of the Secretary of Balitbangtan
  1. Office for Agricultural Technology Transfer And Intellectual Property Management, Bogor
3. Indonesian Center for Food Crops Research and Development, Bogor
  1. Indonesian Center for Rice Research, Subang
  2. Indonesian Legumes and Tuber Crops Research Institute, Malang
  3. Indonesian Cereals Research Institute, Maros
  4. Tungro Diseases Research Station, Lanrang (Sidrap, South Sulawesi)
4. Indonesian Center for Horticulture Research and Development, Bogor
  1. Indonesian Vegetables Research Institute, Lembang
  2. Indonesian Fruits Research Institute, Solok
  3. Indonesian Ornamental Crops Research Institute, Cianjur
  4. Indonesian Citrus and Subtropical Fruits Research Institute, Malang
5. Indonesian Center for Estate Crops Research and Development, Bogor
  1. Indonesian Spice and Medicinal Crops Research Institute, Bogor
  2. Indonesian Sweetener and Fiber Crops Research Institute, Malang
  3. Indonesian Palm Research Institute, Manado
  4. Indonesian Industry and Freshener Crops Research Institute, Sukabumi
6. Indonesian Center for Animal Research and Development, Bogor
  1. Indonesian Research Center for Veterinary Sciences, Bogor
  2. Indonesian Research Institute for Animal Production, Bogor
  3. Beef Cattle Research Station, Pasuruan
  4. Goats Research Station, Sei Putih (Galang, Deli Serdang, North Sumatera)
7. Indonesian Center for Agricultural Land Resources Research and Development, Bogor
  1. Indonesian Wetland Research Institute, Banjarbaru
  2. Indonesian Soil Research Institute, Bogor
  3. Indonesian Agroclimate and Hydrology Research Institute, Bogor
  4. Indonesian Agricultural Environment Research Institute, Pati

Former institutes under Balitbangtan are:

1. Indonesian Center for Agricultural Library and Technology Dissemination, Bogor (currently moved to the Ministry of Agriculture's General Secretariat)
2. Indonesian Center for Agriculture Socio Economic and Policy Studies, Jakarta (currently moved to the Ministry of Agriculture's General Secretariat)
