= National Institute of Health Research and Development (Indonesia) =

Biomedical research institute, government agency in Jakarta, Indonesia

- Badan Penelitian dan Pengembangan Kesehatan
- Logo of Ministry of Health, used by units and agencies under the Ministry of Health, including Balitbangkes

- Logo of Balitbangkes

Agency overview
- Formed: 12 December 1975
- Preceding agencies: Institute for People's Food of Department of Health; Central Institute for Investigation and Eradication of Venereal Diseases of Department of Health; Tawangmangu Hortus Medicus of Department of Health; National Research Institute of Department of Health
- Dissolved: 31 December 2021
- Superseding agencies: Health Research Organization of National Research and Innovation Agency; Agency for Health Policies Development, Ministry of Health; Directorate General of Public Health, Ministry of Health
- Jurisdiction: Indonesia
- Agency executive: Andi Saguni, Acting Head of Balitbangkes
- Parent agency: Ministry of Health
- Website: https://www.litbang.kemkes.go.id/ (Indonesian only)

The National Institute of Health Research and Development (Indonesian: Badan Penelitian dan Pengembangan Kesehatan, abbreviated as Balitbangkes) was a supporting unit of the Ministry of Health which is responsible for state research, development, and innovation in the field of health and medical sciences. The agency dissolved and liquidated into National Research and Innovation Agency (BRIN) on 31 December 2021 as part of BRIN state research activity integration plan.

== History ==
=== Formation ===
Before Balitbangkes existed, the agency was preceded by four Health Laboratories under the Indonesian Department of Health formed in 1950-1960s, three were soon founded after the end of Indonesian National Revolution: Institute for People's Food in Bogor (researched human nutrition), Central Institute for Investigation and Eradication of Venereal Diseases in Surabaya (researched transmission and eradication of sexually transmitted diseases and venereal diseases), and Tawangmangu Hortus Medicus in Karanganyar (researched traditional herbal medicines and remedies and collection of medicinal plants), and the last was 1969 founded National Research Institute of Department of Health. The National Research Institute of Department of Health was the direct preceding agency of the current Balitbangkes after consolidating three 1950s founded Health Laboratories and expanded it with additional laboratories that subsequently formed.

By decree, the agency was founded by President Suharto, on 26 August 1974 through issuance of Presidential Decision No. 45/1974, along with other ten research and development agencies founded by this Decision. However, at that time, the agency was still existed on paper and physically inexistent. After procuring enough resources and assets, the agency finally came into being on 12 December 1975 thru Ministry of Health Decree No. 114/1975 and named as Badan Penelitian dan Pengembangan Kesehatan or colloquially abbreviated as Balitbangkes.

=== Role in COVID-19 Pandemic Situation in Indonesia ===
Balitbangkes play significant role in COVID-19 pandemic situation in Indonesia. Balitbangkes play roles in development measures and policies to control COVID-19, and surveilling local variants and SARS-CoV-2 viral evolution in Indonesia thru Whole Genome Sequencing equipments owned by the agency. Balitbangkes and its child agencies also performed 24 ongoing nation-wide multidisciplinary COVID-19 observation studies across Indonesia.

=== Integration to BRIN and Dissolution ===
In response of formation of National Research and Innovation Agency as independent agency under the President of Indonesia, the Ministry of Health rearranged their research and development activities which had been long exercised by its Balitbangkes. In the plan, announced on 23 September 2021, Balitbangkes will be transformed into Agency for Health Policies Development (Indonesian: Badan Kebijakan Pembangunan Kesehatan, BKPK), a regulatory agency intended to provide only policies and standards making for state health activity, no longer doing research as the research part will be relinquished to BRIN.

On 7 November 2021, the Ministry issued order to Balitbangkes and its child agencies to halt their activities per 31 December 2021 as unit under auspices of Ministry of Health, effectively started the dismantlement of Balitbangkes. In the order, Balitbangkes will split into three parts: one part (which is the most) relinquished to BRIN, one part to become BKPK, and the rest of the Balitbangkes part in regional level will be relinquished to local government where the Balitbangkes branch formerly existed for being transformed into local-government run public health laboratories for being integrated as part of state public health laboratories system.

In 30 November 2021, BRIN announced that a research organization tentatively named Health and Nutrition Research Organization (Indonesian: Organisasi Riset Kesehatan dan Gizi, ORKG), transformation of the previously from Balitbangkes of will be activated and operated. The successor of Balitbangkes, later named as Health Research Organization (Indonesian: Organisasi Riset Kesehatan, OR Kesehatan) formed officially on 1 March 2022 and functional on 4 March 2022.

=== Fate of remnants of Balitbangkes ===
All research centers remnants of former Balitbangkes subsequently subsumed into Directorate General of Public Health of the Ministry of Health and converted into its units. Despite the integration to BRIN, some health research activities that not relinquished to BRIN still performed by Ministry of Health. Research in human genome sequencing and biobank, biorepository, and bioinformatics development and management currently performed by Indonesian Institute for Biomedics and Human Genomics. Lab-based diagnostics, modelling, early warning, and fast response system development and utilization for disease surveillance and responding plagues and/or other health incidents performed thru Indonesian public health laboratories system, which absorbed all former Balitbangkes regional branches. Public health inspection and referral system development and counter-bioterrorism response development performed by Indonesian Institute for Health Biology. Research and maintenance of biorepository of disease vectors, reservoir, and zoonotic agents, and research in environmental health and counter-CBRN response development performed by Indonesian Institute for Environmental Health Laboratory.

== Structure ==
The Structure of Balitbangkes is as follows:

1. Office of the Head of Balitbangkes
2. Office of the Secretary of Balitbangkes
  - Subdivision of General Administration Affairs
3. Center for Biomedical and Basic Medical Technologies Research and Development (Center No.1)
  - Division of General Administration Affairs
    - Subdivision of Programs and Cooperation
    - Subdivision of Finance, Employment, and General Affairs
  - Division of Biomedical Sciences
    - Subdivision of Communicable Diseases
    - Subdivision of Non-Communicable Diseases
  - Division of Health Basic Technologies
    - Subdivision of Biological-based Products
    - Subdivision of Instruments and Diagnostic Products
  - Bacteriology Laboratory
  - BSL-3 Laboratory
  - Immunology Laboratory
  - Virology Laboratory
  - Stem Cell Laboratory
  - Nutrition and Food Laboratory
  - Pharmaceutical Chemistry Laboratory
  - Parasitology Laboratory
  - Testing Animal Laboratory
4. Center for Health Resources and Health Service Research and Development (Center No. 2)
  - Subdivision of General Administration Affairs
  - Division of Administration Development
    - Subdivision of Development for Human Resources and Financing of Health Researches, Developments, and Assessments
  - Division of Health Resources Development
    - Subdivision of Health Resources Development
    - Subdivision of Pharmaceuticals and Medical Devices
    - Subdivision of Health Human Resource Development
  - Division of Health Services Development
    - Subdivision of Primary Health Services and Health Referral Services
    - Subdivision of Traditional Health Services and Health Supporting Services
5. Center for Public Health Efforts Research and Development (Center No. 3)
  - Division of Diseases Prevention and Control
    - Subdivision of Non-Communicable Diseases and Mental Health
    - Subdivision of Communicable Diseases
  - Division of Public Health
    - Subdivision of Nutrition and Family Health
    - Subdivision of Community Health
  - Division of General Administration Affairs
    - Subdivision of Finance, Employment, and General Affairs
    - Subdivision of Programs and Cooperation
6. Center for Humanities and Health Management Research and Development (Center No. 4)
  - Division of Health Humanities
    - Subdivision of Law and Ethics
    - Subdivision of Social and Cultural Affairs
  - Division of Health Management
    - Subdivision of Funding
    - Subdivision of Policy Analysis
  - Division of General Administration Affairs
    - Subdivision of Finance, Employment, and General Affairs
    - Subdivision of Programs and Cooperation
7. Indonesian Center for Research and Development of Disease Vectors and Reservoirs
  - Subdivision of General Administration Affairs
  - Division of Administration Development
    - Subdivision of Development for Human Resources and Financing of Health Researches, Developments, and Assessments
  - Division of Programs, Cooperation, and Information Networking
    - Subdivision of Programs and Evaluation of Researches, Developments, and Assessments Activities
    - Subdivision of Cooperation and Networking
  - Division of Experimental Services and Equipment
    - Subdivision of Technical Support
    - Subdivision of Research and Development Equipment
  - Virology Laboratory
  - Bacteriology Laboratory
  - Parasitology Laboratory
  - Disease Vectors Reference Collection Laboratory
  - Disease Reservoirs Reference Collection Laboratory
  - Histopathology Laboratory
  - Insecticide Testing Laboratory
  - Botanical Pesticide Testing Laboratory
  - Health Behavior and Health Promotion, Epidemiology, GIS, and Biostatistical Laboratory
  - Environmental Laboratory
  - Testing Animal Laboratory
  - Hybridoma Technology Laboratory
  - Insectarium and Biocontrol Laboratory
8. Indonesian Center for Research and Development of Medicinal Plants and Traditional Medicine
  - Division of General Administration Affairs
    - Subdivision of General Affairs
    - Subdivision of Finance
  - Division of Programs, Cooperation, and Information Networking
    - Subdivision of Programs and Evaluation
    - Subdivision of Cooperation and Information Networking
  - Division of Experimental Services and Equipment
    - Subdivision of Technical Support
    - Subdivision of Research and Development Equipment
  - Plant Systematic Laboratory
  - Galenic Formulation Laboratory
  - Phytochemistry Laboratory
  - Formulation Laboratory
  - Microbiology Laboratory
  - Plant Tissue Culture Laboratory
  - Biomolecular Laboratory
  - Jamu Scientification Clinic Laboratory
  - Postharvest Laboratory
  - Pest and Plant Disease Control Laboratory
  - Pharmacology Laboratory
  - Medicinal Plants Cultivation Laboratory
9. Class I Center for Health Research and Development Magelang (Nutrition Science)
10. Class I Center for Health Research and Development Donggala (Schistosomiasis Investigation and Control)
11. Class I Center for Health Research and Development Banjarnegara (Leptospirosis Investigation and Control)
12. Class II Center for Health Research and Development Tanah Bumbu (Fasciolopsis Investigation and Control)
13. Class II Center for Health Research and Development Papua (Leprosy Investigation and Control)
14. Class II Center for Health Research and Development Baturaja (Filariasis Investigation and Control)
15. Class II Center for Health Research and Development Aceh (Tuberculosis Investigation and Control)
16. Pangandaran Malaria Research Station, Pangandaran
17. Waikabubak Arbovirosis Research Station, Waikabubak, East Nusa Tenggara
