= Sriyanto =

Indonesian army officer

Deputy Chief of the National Peatland and Mangrove Management Agency
- Incumbent
- Assumed office 15 October 2026
- Preceded by: office established

Personal details
- Spouse: Rizki Oktavia
- Education: Indonesian Military Academy; Macquarie University (M.I.R); King's College London (M.A.); Indonesian Defence University (M.Han.); Sriwijaya University (Dr., ongoing)

Military service
- Allegiance: Indonesia
- Branch/service: Indonesian Army
- Years of service: 1998–present
- Rank: Major general
- Unit: Engineering

Sriyanto is an Indonesian army officer who is currently serving as the deputy chief of the National Peatland and Mangrove Management Agency, in office since 15 October 2026. An officer of the army engineering corps, Sriyanto has held various command and staff positions in the army and the National Resilience Agency, including as the commander of the Buton and the Jambi city military district. Sriyanto is a graduate of the Taruna Nusantara High School and the Indonesian Military Academy.

== Early life, education, and personal life ==
Sriyanto graduated from the Taruna Nusantara semi-military boarding high school in 1995 and continued his education at the Indonesian Military Academy. He graduated in 1998 and was commissioned as a second lieutenant of the army engineering corps. He received his master's degree in international relations from the Macquarie University in 2007, in defence studies from King's College London in 2013, and in military campaign and strategy from the Indonesian Defence University in 2023. Sriyanto is currently pursuing a doctorate in public administration at the Sriwijaya University.

Sriyanto is married to Rizki Oktavia.

== Military career ==
Sriyanto was assigned to the army engineering directorate upon graduating, progressing from a CBRN platoon commander to company commander. He was deployed to Congo as a surveyor in 2003, before taking part in Indonesia's first MONUSCO army engineering taskforce as a logistics officer until 2004. After completing an advanced course for army engineering officers in 2008, Sriyanto was appointed as the head of patriotic knowledge subdepartment in the army engineering training center. He was assigned to the armed forces headquarters in 2009 as a mid-level assistant officer for foreign education. In 2010, he was recalled to the army headquarters, where during this period he attended a number of international conferences and training programs in the United States, Australia, and Turkey. He received the Colin East Award from the Indonesia-Australia Defence Alumni Association in 2012. Upon finishing Joint Services Command and Staff College in 2013, he was assigned to the Indonesian Army Command and General Staff College, where he took on assistant officer roles for the research and development of operation strategy and on education selection, consecutively, until 2015.

On 11 March 2015, Sriyanto, with the rank of major, was installed as the commander of the 8th Combat Engineering Battalion, based in Maros, South Sulawesi. In 2016, Sriyanto decided to held the battalion's 50th anniversary at its headquarters instead of the ceremonial grounds as usual in order to shed light on the condition of the road surrounding the headquarters. On the same year, the battalion was designated as the main contributor of troops for Indonesia's 13th (M) army engineering taskforce for MONUSCO. As the battalion was the main contributor for the task force, Sriyanto was designated as the task force's commanding officer, marking his second tour in Congo.

The task force departed Jakarta in January 2016 with armed forces chief of staff Didit Herdiawan leading the sent off ceremony. Prior to their departure, the unit underwent a one-month training at the Indonesian peacekeeping center. The 175-strong unit was stationed at Dungu and Bunia, two small towns located near DRC's border with South Sudan. During its one-year deployment, the task force managed to increase Indonesia's reimbursement from UN missions and reportedly impressed UN inspectors by being able to repair a Land Rover Defender broken for 5 years in just a night. The task force also took part in the maintenance and construction of a number of infrastructure and trained the Moroccan contingent on bomb disposal. The task force earned the distinction as the best contingent during the midterm evaluation and at the end of its duty in January 2017 Sriyanto received the UN medal on behalf of the task force.

After commanding the battalion for two years, on 21 March 2017 Sriyanto was appointed as the commander of the Buton military district. During his tenure, Sriyanto organized the screening of the Pengkhianatan G30S/PKI movie in accordance with the directions of armed forces commander Gatot Nurmantyo. He relinquished his command of the military district less than a year later on 30 January 2018 and was reassigned to the armed forces peacekeeping center, where he took part in peacekeeping preparations and inspecting peacekeeping missions. Between 2019 and 2020, Sriyanto was reassigned to the armed forces academy as assistant officer for operations security.

Newsreel reporting on Sriyanto's inauguration ceremony as the commander of Jambi city military district, 2021

Upon completing the armed forces joint command and staff college in 2021, on 25 October of that year he became the Jambi city military district commander. At his inauguration, he expressed his positive impression of the city's Malay culture and pledged to accelerate COVID-19 pandemic in his jurisdiction. In the wake of protests in the city, Sriyanto directed troops under his command to assist the police force in safeguarding the protests. After half a year of service in Jambi, Sriyanto moved to the Sriwijaya (Southern Sumatra) regional military command in Palembang as logistics assistant on 1 April 2022 and handed over his command over the Jambi military district to a new officeholder on 22 April 2022. Shortly after taking office, the military command faced protests from heritage preservationists who was concerned that the expansion of the army's A.K. Gani hospital would damage the nearby Benteng Kuto Besak (BKB) cultural heritage area. Sriyanto, on behalf of the regional military commander, signed an agreement pledging that the hospital's expansion would continue with the preservation of the BKB cultural heritage area in mind.

He was replaced from his assistantship on 31 May 2023 and was sent to Jakarta as deputy director for strategic studies evaluation and documentation within the National Resilience Institute. He attended the National Resilience Institute's short-term leadership course in 2025 as its 68th cohort. In August 2025, the army underwent a massive organizational overhaul, with the formation of six new regional military commands. Among these regional military commands were the Radin Inten regional military command, covering the Lampung and Bengkulu province, with Sriyanto's senior in high school Kristomei Sianturi in command over the territory. Sriyanto was appointed by Kristomei as the coordinator of the commander's advisory group, a one-star position, on 15 August 2025. He conducted supervision on the construction of government cooperatives building in January 2026. Less than a year later, on 15 October 2026 Sriyanto was appointed as the deputy chief of the newly formed National Peatland and Mangrove Management Agency and was promoted to the rank of major general on the same day.

== Dates of rank ==
Brigadier general	2025
Major general	15 October 2026
