= Eijkman Molecular Biology Research Center =

Laboratory in Indonesia

Eijkman Center for Molecular Biology
- Pusat Riset Biologi Molekuler Eijkman
- Logo of Eijkman Molecular Biology Research Center. The logo had not changed since 31 December 1938 when the institute still named as Eijkman Institute

Agency overview
- Formed: 15 January 1888; 31 July 1992 (current form)
- Preceding agencies: Geneeskundig Laboratorium; Eijkman Instituut; Lembaga Eijkman; Lembaga Biologi Molekuler Eijkman
- Dissolved: 1 January 2022 (special status stripped)
- Superseding agencies: Eijkman Center for Molecular Biology; Deputy IV of National Research and Innovation Agency
- Jurisdiction: Indonesia
- Agency executive: Elizabeth Farah Novita Courtier, Chief
- Parent agency: Research Organization for Health

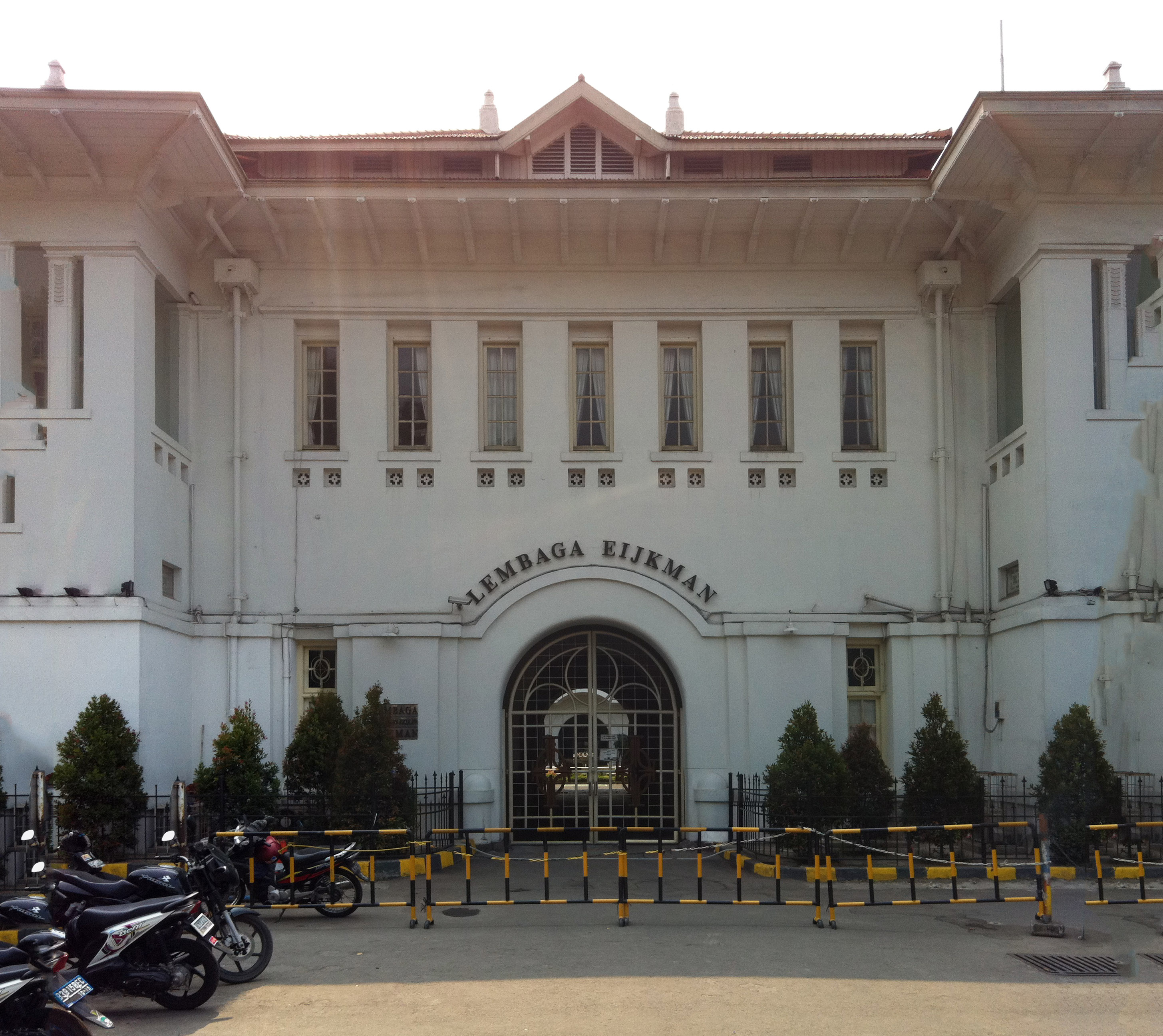
The institute in 2011

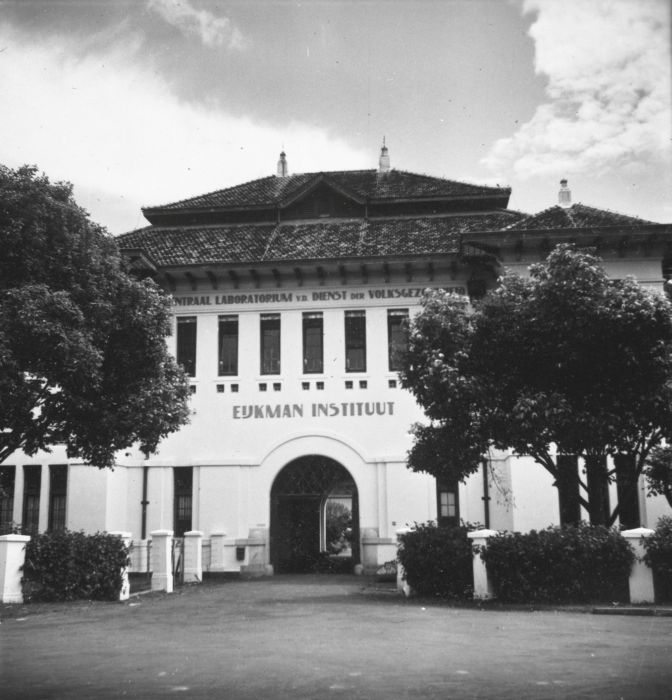
The institute in 1939

The Eijkman Molecular Biology Research Center, formerly Eijkman Institute for Molecular Biology is a laboratory in Jakarta, Indonesia. It is most known for the discovery by Christiaan Eijkman that Beriberi was caused by a lack of thiamine in the human body.

== History ==
Founded as the Geneeskundig Laboratorium, or Medical Laboratory, at Jalan Diponegoro No. 69 in Central Jakarta in 1888, Christiaan Eijkman was stationed there as its first director. During his time there, he discovered that Beriberi, which was commonly believed to be caused by external forces, was caused by a lack of thiamine in the human body. This led to a Nobel Prize for Physiology or Medicine for Eijkman in 1929. In 1938, the laboratory was renamed the Eijkman Instituut (Eijkman Institute) in honor of Eijkman.

During World War II, Japanese occupiers accused the center's first Indonesian director, Achmad Mochtar, of poisoning a batch of vaccine that was to be delivered to slave laborers. After Mochtar and his researchers were tortured and interrogated, he made a deal with the Japanese that he would plead guilty if his researchers were released. He was then executed and buried in an unmarked grave. It is possible that Mochtar was a scapegoat for a failed Japanese experiment designed to validate a conjured tetanus toxoid vaccine for their troops.

During the 1960s, the institute closed due to upheaval in the country and was absorbed into the Cipto Mangunkusomo Hospital. It remained closed for the next thirty years until 1992, when B.J. Habibie, the Minister of Research and Technology, decided to reopen the institute. The institute opened formally by Ministry of Research and Technology Decree No. 475/M/Kp/VII/1992. By 1993, it was fully operational, but ran into further troubles in 1998 due to the Asian financial crisis.

In 2004, the institute identified the suicide bomber who blew himself up in front of the Australian Embassy, which drew recognition to the practical benefits of molecular biology. Today, the institute houses one of the few Biosafety Level 3 laboratories in the country, which is equipped with a gas decontamination chamber.

For a long time since its re-formation in 1992, the Eijkman Institute was subordinate of Ministry of Research and Technology. However, Eijkman Institute somewhat enjoyed unique status within the ministry. The most important was, despite being a government-run institute, their recruitment of their human resources mostly by contract similar to a private company recruitment. As result, the Eijkman Institute researchers and staffs having unusual status in Indonesia government employment system and cannot be categorized as one, they are not a government civil servant but having their salary paid by government. Not only that they do not have proper career track as Indonesian government scientists and government staffs.

== Demotion, strippage, and institutional split ==
Since 22 September 2021, the Eijkman Institute had officially become subordinate under the National Research and Innovation Agency (Indonesian: Badan Riset dan Inovasi Nasional, BRIN) instead of the Ministry of Education, Culture, Research, and Technology. The name of the institute was then changed to Eijkman Molecular Biology Research Center, operating under the Life Sciences Research Organization of National Research and Innovation Agency. Due to its absorption by the National Research and Innovation Agency, the institute was stripped from its unique status, being demoted into a research center, and placed under BRIN supervision and scrutiny for its unusual practice in recruiting researchers and staffs.

=== Controversy on Liquidation ===
On 1 January 2022, there is information that BRIN started the termination of most of Eijkman Molecular Biology Research Center researchers. The information confirmed to be true. BRIN offered them to become government scientists of BRIN thru available government civil servant selection processes, although BRIN returned the choice to the terminated Eijkman researchers and staffs. About 113 Eijkman staffs terminated, with 71 researchers and 42 non-researcher staffs affected by this rationalization. At the same day, it is announced that current Eijkman Molecular Biology Research Center split into several parts, the Eijkman Molecular Biology Research Center itself, one part to Deputy IV (Research and Innovation Infrastructure) of BRIN, and rest will be relinquished to Ministry of Health.

The move criticized strongly by both ruling coalition and opposition. People's Representative Council, officially requested BRIN for information and explanation for the Eijkman staff's termination in response of the issues.

The Ministry of State Apparatus Utilization and Bureaucratic Reform confirmed the BRIN's move as legal move. Tjahjo Kumolo, the minister, further broke down that from 71 terminated researchers, 68 are research assistants with bachelor's and master's degree, 2 junior researchers (below 40) with PhD degree, and 1 senior researcher (over 40) with PhD degree. He revealed, either BRIN liquidated it or not, the Eijkman Molecular Biology Research Center eventually will be reformed by government due the past mismanagement of personnel and other irregularities when the institution still existed as Eijkman Institute.

== Building ==
From the outside, the building has been described as looking like a museum, although the inside has not been renovated in an attempt to keep the building looking as it did when Eijkman was working there. This includes a visitor's lounge which is still furnished with wood and rattan chairs and other furnishings that have not been changed since the opening of the building. The building will be relinquished to Ministry of Health and will be replaced to a new building at Cibinong.
