= Ministry of Agriculture (Indonesia) =

Government ministry of Indonesia

- Kementerian Pertanian
- Seal of the Ministry of Agriculture

- Flag of the Ministry of Agriculture

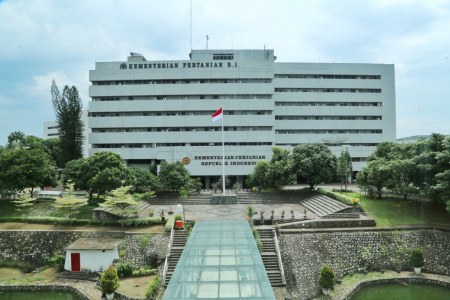
- Ministry of Agriculture headquarters

Ministry overview
- Formed: 19 August 1945
- Jurisdiction: Government of Indonesia
- Headquarters: Jalan Harsono R.M. No. 3 Jakarta Selatan 12550 Jakarta, Indonesia
- Minister responsible: Amran Sulaiman, Minister of Agriculture
- Deputy Minister responsible: Alim Setiawan, Deputy Minister of Agriculture
- Parent department: Coordinating Ministry for Food Affairs
- Website: www.pertanian.go.id

The Ministry of Agriculture (Indonesian: Kementerian Pertanian) is a government ministry overseeing agriculture development in Indonesia. It is headed by a Minister of Agriculture, who is directly responsible to the President.

== History ==
The Department of Agriculture was established on 1 January 1905 by the Dutch East Indies Government as Department of Agriculture (Dutch: Departement van Landbouw) in 1905. It was later renamed the Department of Agriculture, Industry, and Trade (Dutch: Departement van Landbouw, Nijverheid en Handel) in 1911 and the Department of Economic Affairs (Dutch: Departement van Ekonomische Zaken) in 1934. During the Japanese occupation, agriculture affairs were handled by the Department of Industry, Military Government (Japanese: 軍政官武 産業部, romanized: Gunseikanbu Sangyobu).

After Indonesian independence, agriculture, trade, and industry were under the Department of Welfare in Indonesia's first cabinet. The first Welfare Minister was Soerachman Tjokroadisoerjo. The Ministry of Agriculture was officially formed on 6 September 1950. On the First Working Cabinet, the "Ministry of Agriculture" was renamed "Department of Agriculture". The name was reverted into the "Ministry of Agriculture" in 2009.

== Organization ==
The Ministry of Agriculture structure followed its permanent constituting document, Presidential Decree No. 192/2024 and as expanded by Ministry of Agriculture Decree No. 02/2025, 07/2025, 08/2025, 09/2025, 10/2025, 11/2025, 37/2025, 39/2025, and 1/2026.

- Office of the Minister of Agriculture
- Office of the Deputy Minister of Agriculture
- General Secretariat
  - Bureau of Planning
  - Bureau of Organization, Apparatuses, and Human Resources
  - Bureau of Legal Affairs
  - Bureau of Finance and State Properties
  - Bureau of General Affairs and Procurement
  - Bureau of Foreign Partnerships
  - Bureau of Communication and Information Services
  - Centers (attached to the General Secretariat)
    - Center for Agricultural Data, Information, and Technology
    - Center for Plant Varieties Protection and Agriculture Licensing
    - Center for Agricultural Social, Economic, and Policies
- Directorate General for Agricultural Lands and Irrigation (Directorate General I)
  - Office of the Directorate General I
  - Office of the Secretary of Directorate General I
  - Directorate of Agricultural Land and Irrigation Mapping
  - Directorate of Land Protection and Optimization
  - Directorate of Land Procurement
  - Directorate of Agricultural Irrigation
  - Directorate of Agricultural Water Resources Conservation and Development
  - Medan Class I Institute for Agricultural Lands and Irrigation, Medan
  - Palembang Class I Institute for Agricultural Lands and Irrigation, Palembang
  - Bandung Class I Institute for Agricultural Lands and Irrigation, Bandung
  - Makassar Class I Institute for Agricultural Lands and Irrigation, Makassar
  - Jayapura Class I Institute for Agricultural Lands and Irrigation, Jayapura
  - Banjarbaru Class II Institute for Agricultural Lands and Irrigation, Banjarbaru
  - Mataram Class II Institute for Agricultural Lands and Irrigation, Mataram
- Directorate General for Agricultural Facilities and Infrastructure (Directorate General II)
  - Office of the Directorate General II
  - Office of the Secretary of Directorate General II
  - Directorate of Pre-harvest Tools and Machinery
  - Directorate of Post-harvest Tools and Machinery
  - Directorate of Fertilizers
  - Directorate of Pesticides
  - Directorate of Agricultural Funding
- Directorate General for Food Crops (Directorate General III)
  - Office of the Directorate General III
  - Office of the Secretary of Directorate General III
  - Directorate of Food Crops Seeding
  - Directorate of Cereals
  - Directorate of Legumes and Tubers
  - Directorate of Food Crops Protection
  - Directorate of Food Crops Products Downstreaming
  - Indonesian Center for Plant Disturbing Organisms Forecasting, Karawang
  - Indonesian Center for Seed Quality Testing Development of Food Crops and Horticulture, Depok
  - Indonesian Institute for Plant Products Testing, South Jakarta
- Directorate General for Horticulture (Directorate General IV)
  - Office of the Directorate General IV
  - Office of the Secretary of Directorate General IV
  - Directorate of Horticulture Seeding
  - Directorate of Fruits and Floriculture
  - Directorate of Vegetables and Medicinal Plants
  - Directorate of Horticulture Protection
  - Directorate of Horticulture Products Downstreaming
- Directorate General for Plantations (Directorate General V)
  - Office of the Directorate General V
  - Office of the Secretary of Directorate General V
  - Directorate of Estate Crops Seeding
  - Directorate of Oil Palm and Palms
  - Directorate of Annuals and Perennials
  - Directorate of Plantation Protection
  - Directorate of Estate Crops Products Downstreaming
  - Indonesian Center for Estate Crops Seeding and Protection "BBPPTP Surabaya", Jombang
  - Indonesian Center for Estate Crops Seeding and Protection "BBPPTP Medan", Medan
  - Indonesian Center for Estate Crops Seeding and Protection "BBPPTP Ambon", Ambon
  - Indonesian Institute for Estate Crops Protection "BPTP Pontianak", Pontianak
- Directorate General for Livestock and Animal Health (Directorate General VI)
  - Office of the Directorate General VI
  - Office of the Secretary of Directorate General VI
  - Directorate of Animal Stocks and Production
  - Directorate of Animal Feed
  - Directorate of Animal Health
  - Directorate of Veterinary Public Health
  - Directorate of Animal Products Downstreaming
  - Indonesian Center for Veterinary Pharmaceuticals "PUSVETMA", Surabaya
  - Indonesian Center for Veterinary Medicine Quality Testing and Certification, Bogor
  - Indonesian Center for Veterinary Services, Wates
  - Indonesian Center for Veterinary Services, Maros
  - Indonesian Center for Veterinary Services, Denpasar
  - Indonesian Center for Artificial Insemination, Singosari
  - Indonesian Center for Good Breeding Practice and Green Animal Fodders, Baturaden
  - Indonesian Institute for Artificial Insemination, Lembang
  - Indonesian Institute for Cattle Embryo Bank, Bogor
  - Indonesian Institute for Animal Products Quality Testing and Certification, Bogor
  - Indonesian Institute for Animal Feed Quality Testing and Certification, Bekasi
  - Indonesian Institute for Veterinary Services, Medan
  - Indonesian Institute for Veterinary Services, Bukittinggi
  - Indonesian Institute for Veterinary Services, Lampung
  - Indonesian Institute for Veterinary Services, Banjarbaru
  - Indonesian Institute for Veterinary Services, Subang
  - Indonesian Institute for Veterinary Services, Jayapura
  - Indonesian Institute for Good Breeding Practice and Green Animal Fodders, Indrapuri
  - Indonesian Institute for Good Breeding Practice and Green Animal Fodders, Padang Mangatas
  - Indonesian Institute for Good Breeding Practice and Green Animal Fodders, Siborongborong
  - Indonesian Institute for Good Breeding Practice and Green Animal Fodders, Sembawa
  - Indonesian Institute for Good Breeding Practice and Green Animal Fodders, Pelaihari
  - Indonesian Institute for Good Breeding Practice and Green Animal Fodders, Denpasar
- General Inspectorate
  - General Inspectorate Administration
  - Inspectorate I
  - Inspectorate II
  - Inspectorate III
  - Inspectorate IV
  - Investigation Inspectorate
- Agency for Agricultural Assemblies and Modernization
  - Office of the Head of Agency for Agricultural Assemblies and Modernization
    - Indonesian Agricultural Assemblies and Modernization Center for Agricultural Mechanics, Tangerang
    - Indonesian Agricultural Assemblies and Modernization Center for Agricultural Post-Harvest, Tangerang
    - Indonesian Agricultural Assemblies and Modernization Center for Agricultural Biotechnology and Genetic Resources, Bogor
    - Indonesian Center for Development and Application of Agricultural Modernization, Bogor
    - Aceh Center for Application of Agricultural Modernization, Banda Aceh
    - North Sumatera Center for Application of Agricultural Modernization, Medan
    - West Sumatera Center for Application of Agricultural Modernization, Solok
    - Riau Center for Application of Agricultural Modernization, Pekanbaru
    - Jambi Center for Application of Agricultural Modernization, Kotabaru
    - South Sumatera Center for Application of Agricultural Modernization, Palembang
    - Bengkulu Center for Application of Agricultural Modernization, Bengkulu
    - Lampung Center for Application of Agricultural Modernization, Bandar Lampung
    - Bangka Belitung Islands Center for Application of Agricultural Modernization, Pangkal Pinang
    - Riau Island Center for Application of Agricultural Modernization, Tanjung Pinang
    - Jakarta Center for Application of Agricultural Modernization, South Jakarta
    - West Java Center for Application of Agricultural Modernization, Lembang
    - Central Java Center for Application of Agricultural Modernization, Ungaran
    - Yogyakarta Center for Application of Agricultural Modernization, Yogyakarta
    - East Java Center for Application of Agricultural Modernization, Malang
    - Banten Center for Application of Agricultural Modernization, Serang
    - Bali Center for Application of Agricultural Modernization, Denpasar
    - West Nusa Tenggara Center for Application of Agricultural Modernization, Mataram
    - East Nusa Tenggara Center for Application of Agricultural Modernization, Kupang
    - West Kalimantan Center for Application of Agricultural Modernization, Pontianak
    - Central Kalimantan Center for Application of Agricultural Modernization, Palangkaraya
    - South Kalimantan Center for Application of Agricultural Modernization, Banjarbaru
    - East Kalimantan Center for Application of Agricultural Modernization, Samarinda
    - North Kalimantan Institute for Application of Agricultural Modernization, Bulungan
    - North Sulawesi Center for Application of Agricultural Modernization, Manado
    - Central Sulawesi Center for Application of Agricultural Modernization, Palu
    - South Sulawesi Center for Application of Agricultural Modernization, Makassar
    - Southeast Sulawesi Center for Application of Agricultural Modernization, Kendari
    - Gorontalo Center for Application of Agricultural Modernization, Gorontalo
    - West Sulawesi Center for Application of Agricultural Modernization, Mamuju
    - Maluku Center for Application of Agricultural Modernization, Ambon
    - North Maluku Center for Application of Agricultural Modernization, Ternate Selatan
    - West Papua Center for Application of Agricultural Modernization, Manokwari
    - Central Papua Station for Application of Agricultural Modernization, Nabire
    - Highland Papua Station for Application of Agricultural Modernization, Wamena
    - Southwest Papua Station for Application of Agricultural Modernization, Sorong
    - Papua Center for Application of Agricultural Modernization, Jayapura
    - South Papua Institute for Application of Agricultural Modernization, Merauke
  - Office of the Secretary of Agency for Agricultural Assemblies and Modernization
    - Management Center for Agricultural Assemblies and Modernization Utilization, Bogor
  - Center for Agricultural Assemblies and Modernization of Food Crops, Bogor
    - Indonesian Agricultural Assemblies and Modernization Center for Rice, Subang
    - Indonesian Agricultural Assemblies and Testing Institute for Legumes, Malang
    - Indonesian Agricultural Assemblies and Testing Institute for Cereals, Maros
    - Indonesian Agricultural Assemblies and Testing Station for Tuber Crops, Sidenreng Rappang
  - Center for Agricultural Assemblies and Modernization of Horticulture, Bogor
    - Indonesian Agricultural Assemblies and Testing Institute for Vegetables, West Bandung
    - Indonesian Agricultural Assemblies and Testing Institute for Tropical Fruits, Solok
    - Indonesian Agricultural Assemblies and Testing Institute for Ornamental Plants, Cianjur
    - Indonesian Agricultural Assemblies and Testing Institute for Citrus and Subtropical Fruits, Batu
  - Center for Agricultural Assemblies and Modernization of Plantations, Bogor
    - Indonesian Agricultural Assemblies and Testing Institute for Spices, Medicinal Plants, and Aromatics, Bogor
    - Indonesian Agricultural Assemblies and Testing Institute for Industrial Crops and Freshener Crops, Sukabumi
    - Indonesian Agricultural Assemblies and Testing Institute for Sweeteners and Fiber Crops, Malang
    - Indonesian Agricultural Assemblies and Testing Institute for Palms, North Minahasa
  - Center for Agricultural Assemblies and Modernization of Animal Husbandry and Veterinary, Bogor
    - Indonesian Agricultural Assemblies and Modernization Center for Veterinary, Bogor
    - Indonesian Agricultural Assemblies and Testing Institute for Fowls and Cattles, Bogor
    - Indonesian Agricultural Assemblies and Testing Station for Large Ruminants, Pasuruan
    - Indonesian Agricultural Assemblies and Testing Station for Small Ruminants, Deli Serdang
  - Indonesian Agricultural Assemblies and Modernization Center for Agricultural Land Resources, Bogor
    - Indonesian Agricultural Assemblies and Testing Institute for Land and Fertilizers, Bogor
    - Indonesian Agricultural Assemblies and Testing Institute for Agricultural Environment, Pati
    - Indonesian Agricultural Assemblies and Testing Institute for Wetland Agriculture, Banjarbaru
    - Indonesian Agricultural Assemblies and Testing Institute for Agroclimatic and Hydrology, Bogor
- Agency for Agricultural Extension and Human Resource Development
  - Office of the Head of Agency for Agricultural Extension and Human Resource Development
  - Office of the Secretary of Agency for Agricultural Extension and Human Resource Development
  - Center for Agricultural Extension
  - Center for Agricultural Education
    - Indonesian Agricultural Engineering Polytechnic "PEPI", Tangerang
    - Medan Agricultural Development Polytechnic, Medan
    - Bogor Agricultural Development Polytechnic, Bogor
    - Yoma Agricultural Development Polytechnic, Yogyakarta-Magelang
    - Malang Agricultural Development Polytechnic, Malang
    - Gowa Agricultural Development Polytechnic, Gowa
    - Manokwari Agricultural Development Polytechnic, Manokwari
    - Sembawa State Agricultural Development Vocational High School, Sembawa
    - Banjarbaru State Agricultural Development Vocational High School, North Banjarbaru
    - Kupang State Agricultural Development Vocational High School, Kupang
  - Center for Agricultural Training
    - Indonesian Training Center for Agricultural Management and Leadership, Ciawi
    - Indonesian Training Center for Agriculture, Lembang
    - Indonesian Training Center for Agriculture, Kupang
    - Indonesian Training Center for Agriculture, Ketindan
    - Indonesian Training Center for Agriculture, Binuang
    - Indonesian Training Center for Agriculture, Batangkaluku
    - Indonesian Training Center for Animal Husbandry, Batu
    - Indonesian Training Center for Veterinary Health, Cinagara
    - Indonesian Training Institute for Agriculture, Jambi
    - Indonesian Training Institute for Agriculture, Lampung
  - Center for Agricultural Officers Competency Assessment and Development
  - Indonesian Center for Agricultural Library and Agricultural Literacy, Central Bogor
  - Indonesian Museum of Soils and Agriculture "Mustani", Central Bogor
- Board of Experts
  - Senior Expert to the Minister on Agricultural Infrastructure
  - Senior Expert to the Minister on Trade and International Relationship
  - Senior Expert to the Minister on Agricultural Investment
  - Senior Expert to the Minister on Agricultural Environment
  - Senior Expert to the Minister on Interinstitutional Relationship, Regulation, and Bureaucracy Reform

== Gallery ==
Logo of Department/ Ministry of Agriculture (1978–2018)

Logo of Ministry of Agriculture(2018–present)
