= Science and technology in Indonesia =

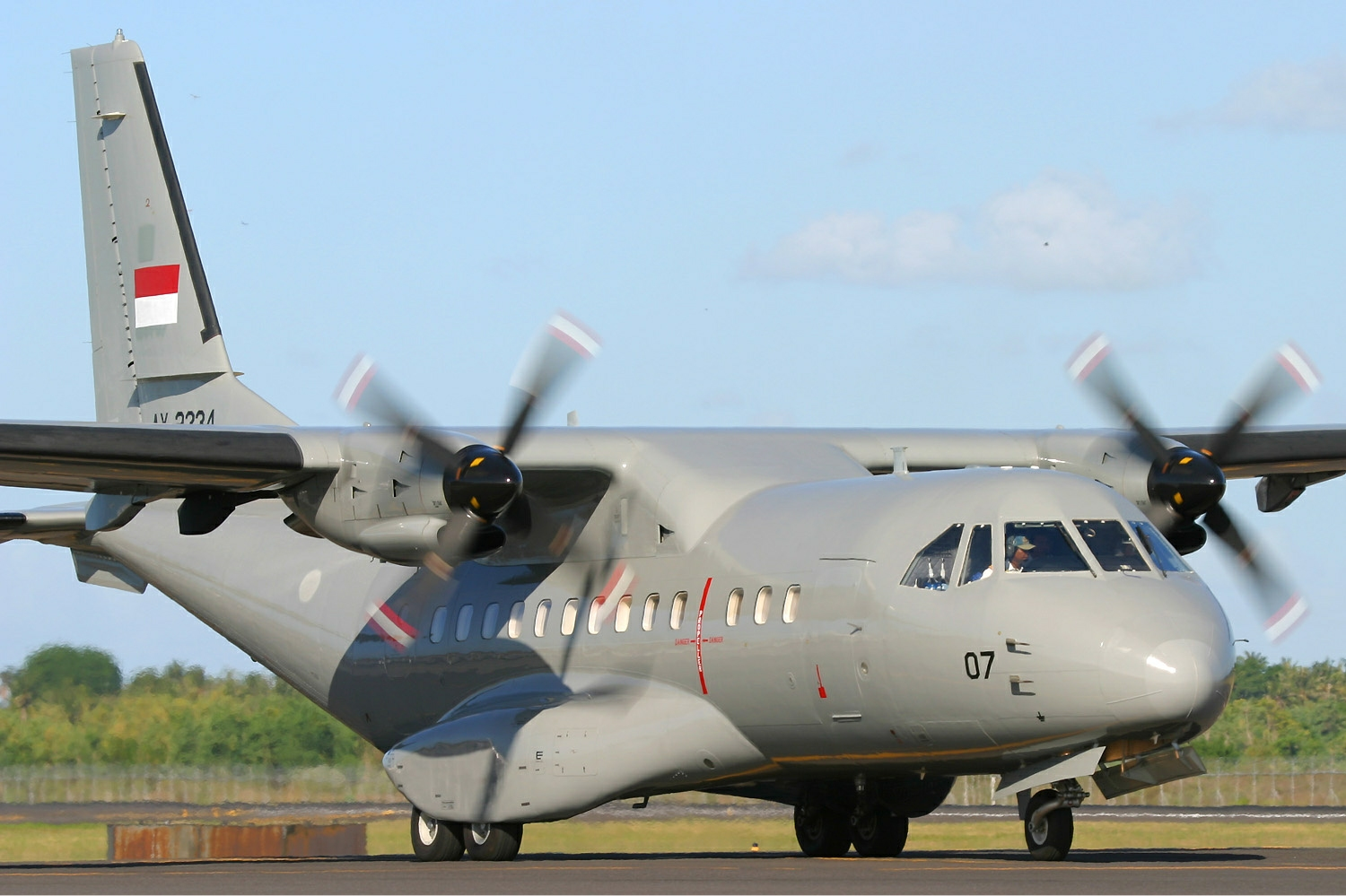
The CASA/IPTN CN-235 is a medium-range twin-engined transport plane that was jointly developed by CASA of Spain and IPTN of Indonesia as a regional airliner and military transport.

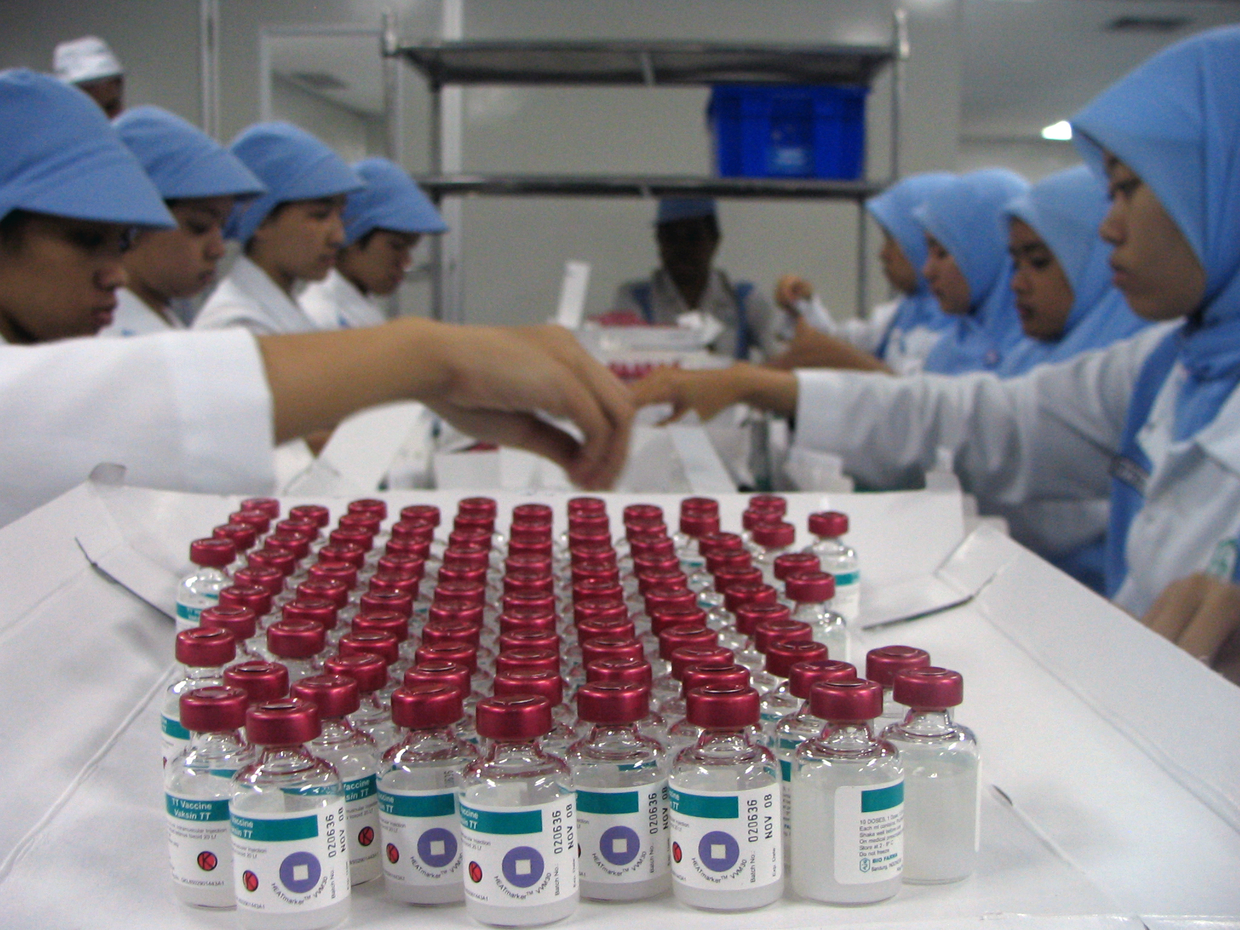
Vaccine vials in Bio Farma, Bandung

Although Indonesia is not considered one of the leading countries in science and technology developments, there are numerous scientific and technological innovations, developments, and achievements contributed by Indonesians. Despite being a developing country, Indonesia is one of a handful nations that have developed their own aerospace technology.

Since the Joko Widodo administration, scientific and technological development in Indonesia became one aspect subjected to reform. Currently, after the 2021 reform in Indonesia's scientific and technological affairs, the republic's Ministry of Education, Culture, Research and Technology is the official body in charge of scientific and technological development in the nation after the disbandment of the Ministry of Research and Technology. The government of Joko Widodo also established the National Research and Innovation Agency (BRIN), as the country's sole multidisciplinary sciences, research, and technological development superagency, replacing the Indonesian Institute of Sciences (LIPI) and other state research and development agencies.

Since 2018, the Indonesian government increased their research and development allocation. In 2018, the government allocated Rp33 trillion (approximately US$2,317,985,439 as on 6 September 2021). In 2019, the government allocated Rp35 trillion (approximately US$2,458,469,405 as on 6 September 2021). In 2020, the government allocated Rp36 trillion (approximately US$2,528,712,000 as on 6 September 2021) for research and development. While it has increased over years, it still holds a very small share of roughly 0.31% of Indonesia's gross domestic product. Not only that, the private sector's contributions to Indonesia research are very low. In 2020, 83.88% of research funding relied on the government, followed by universities (2.65%), business companies (9.15%), and private non-profit groups (4.33%).

== History ==
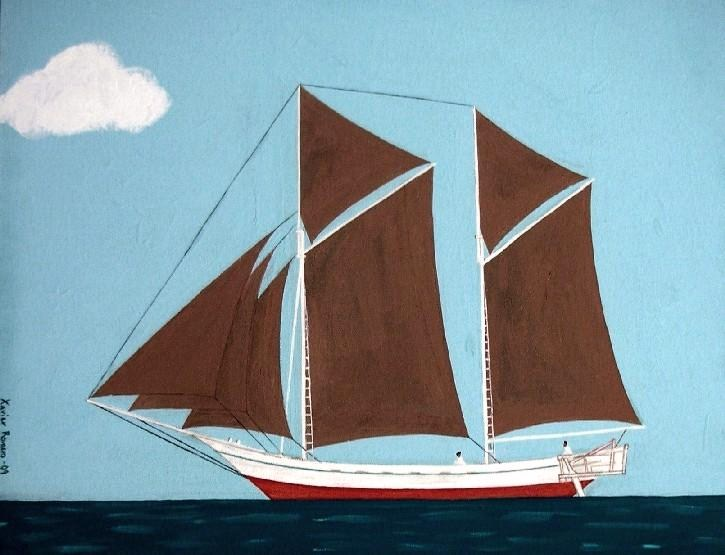
Drawing of a Pinisi-rigged lamba

Living in an agrarian and maritime culture, the people of the Indonesian archipelago have become well-known in some traditional technologies, particularly in agriculture. In agriculture for instance, Indonesia and many other Southeast Asian countries are famous for paddy cultivation and techniques such as terracing. Local systems of complex irrigation and water management have been developed in the archipelagos. An exceptional example is Subak, the irrigation system of Bali.

The Austronesian people from Nusantara have already been accomplished sailors since at least 1500 BC. During that era, the distribution of kapur Barus already reached ancient Egypt.

The Austronesians also reached Madagascar in the early 1st millennium AD and colonized it. By the 8th or 9th century A.D., ancient Indonesian ships may have already reached as far as Ghana, likely using the outrigger Borobudur ship and the K'un-lun po or jong. A Chinese record in 200 AD, describes the K'un-lun Po (meaning "ship/perahu from K'un-lun" — Either Java or Sumatra) as being capable of carrying 600–700 people and 250–1000 tons of cargo.

The Konjo, Ara and Lemo-Lemo people from the island of Sulawesi in eastern Indonesia are also well known for their shipbuilding technology. They are renowned for making a wooden sailing vessel called the palari, using a sail system (rigging) known as pinisi. It is a common misunderstanding that the Buginese, Makassar, and Bira people built these vessels, in reality they are just sail them, not the builder.

The Javanese and Malay people, like other Austronesian ethnicities, use a solid navigation system: Orientation at sea is carried out using a variety of different natural signs, and by using a very distinctive astronomical technique called "star path navigation". Basically, the navigators determine the bow of the ship to the islands that are recognized by using the position of rising and setting of certain stars above the horizon. In the Majapahit era, compasses and magnets were used, and cartography was developed: The use of maps full of longitudinal and transverse lines, rhumb lines, and direct route lines traveled by ships were recorded by Europeans, to the point that the Portuguese considered the Javanese maps to be the best maps in the early 1500s.

In architecture, native Indonesians have developed their own vernacular architecture. Some examples of architecturally significant Indonesian buildings are Rumah Gadang of Minangkabau, Tongkonan of Toraja, and omo sebua of Nias. The Omo Sebua is noted for its sturdy yet flexible design which allows it to resist earthquakes.

Half cross-section of Borobudur

By the 8th century, the Javanese kingdom of Medang Mataram developed an advanced stone mason architectural technology in candi (temple) building. This includes the Borobudur temple, the Prambanan temple, and many other temples. Architectural techniques that have been developed include knobs, indentations and dovetails used to form joints between stones and bind them without mortar. Other significant architectural advancements include roofs, niches, and arched gateways constructed in the corbelling method.

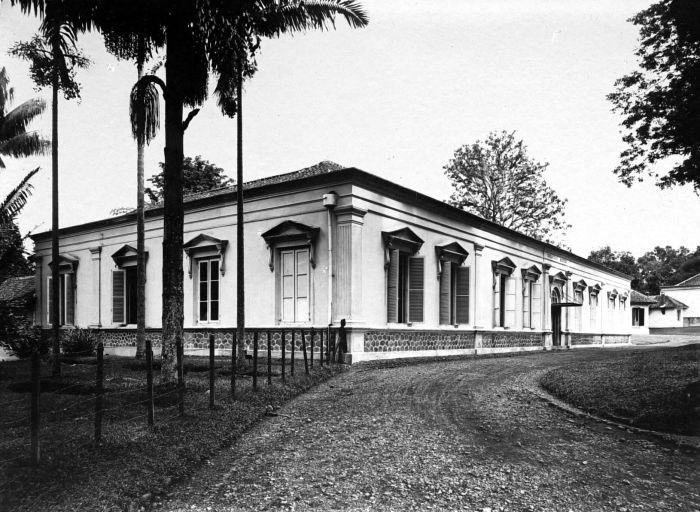
Museum and lab of the Buitenzorg Plantentuin

The scientific quest and systematic research in accordance to the modern scientific method began to develop and flourish in Indonesia during the Dutch East Indies period, started in the 19th century. The Dutch East Indies has attracted intellectuals, scientists and researchers. Some notable scientists that conducted most of their important research in the East Indies archipelago are Teijsmann, Junghuhn, Eijkman, Dubois and Wallace. Many important art, culture and science institutions were established in Dutch East Indies. For example, the Bataviaasch Genootschap van Kunsten en Wetenschappen, (Royal Batavian Society of Arts and Sciences), the predecessor of the National Museum of Indonesia, was established in 1778 with the aim to promote research and publish findings in the field of arts and sciences, especially history, archaeology, ethnography and physics. The Bogor Botanical Gardens with Herbarium Bogoriense and Museum Zoologicum Bogoriense was a major centre for botanical research established in 1817, with the aim to study the flora and fauna of the archipelago.

Java Man was discovered by Eugène Dubois in 1891. The Komodo dragon was first described by Peter Ouwens in 1912, after an aeroplane crash accident in 1911 and rumors about living dinosaurs in Komodo Island in 1910. Vitamin B_{1} and its relation to beriberi disease was discovered by Eijkman during his work in the Indies.

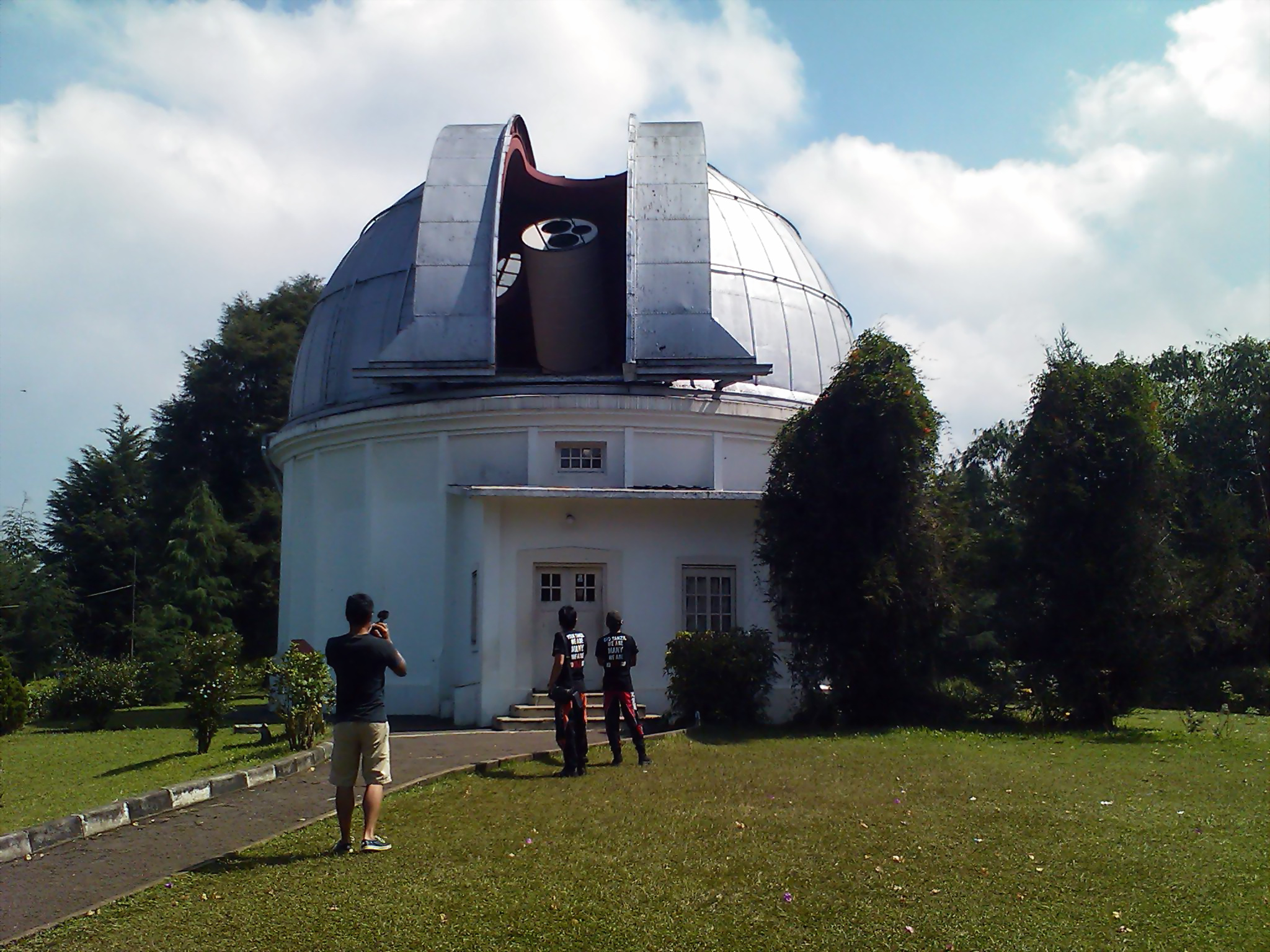
Bosscha Observatory built in 1923, today is operated by Bandung Institute of Technology

With growing interest in scientific research, the government of the Dutch East Indies established Natuurwetenschappelijke Raad voor Nederlandsch-Indië (Scientific Council of the Dutch East Indies) in 1928. It operates as the country's main research organization until the outbreak of Pacific War in 1942. In 1948 the institute was renamed Organisatie voor Natuurwetenschappelijk Onderzoek (OPIPA, Organization for Scientific Research).

After the independence of Indonesia, the government continued to nurture scientific development and pursuits through government institutions. In 1956, the OPIPA was nationalized as Majelis Ilmu Pengetahuan Indonesia (MIPI, Indonesian Sciences Council). In 1962, the government established the Departemen Urusan Riset Nasional (DURENAS, National Research Affairs Department), while MIPI are in charge of founding and operates various national research institutes. In 1966, the government changed the status of DURENAS into Lembaga Riset Nasional (LEMRENAS) (National Research Institute). In August 1967 the government dissolved LEMRENAS and MIPI and established the current Indonesian Institute of Sciences (LIPI), which runs the scientific efforts and operations that was previously conducted by LEMRENAS and MIPI.

One of four pillars of Vision of Indonesia 2045 is the "human development and the mastery of science and technology". This Indonesian ideal that set the goal for the country by its centennial in 2045, duly recognized and realized the importance of science and technology for the future of the nation.

In 2021, Indonesia experienced reform in the science and technology field with the formation of the Ministry of Education, Culture, Research, and Technology and the National Research and Innovation Agency as part of the government plan in consolidating science and research resources.

== Institutions ==
Indonesian Institute of Sciences building in Jakarta

Among the main research and development institutions in the country, are:

- The Ministry of Higher Education, Science, and Technology (Indonesian: Kementerian Pendidikan Tinggi, Sains, dan Teknologi Republik Indonesia, or Kemendiktisaintek), is a government ministry that has the task of conducting affairs in the field of research, science, and technology, aside of higher education affairs.
- The National Research and Innovation Agency (Indonesian: Badan Riset dan Inovasi Nasional, or BRIN) is the sole multidisciplinary sciences, research, and technology development superagency dedicated to science and research in the country. BRIN is, technically, the sole national research agency after liquidating many research agencies into its body. Despite that, some research subjects still remain outside BRIN jurisdiction.
- The Geospatial Information Agency (Indonesian: Badan Informasi Geospasial, or BIG), is responsible for surveys and mapping.
- The National Standardization Body (Indonesian: Badan Standardisasi Nasional, or BSN), member of the International Organization for Standardization.

Some specialized state agencies also performing research and development, but in much different level than previously mentioned before:

- The National Cyber and Crypto Agency (Indonesian: Badan Siber dan Sandi Negara, or BSSN), which tasked for research and development for the civilian, state-level cipher as one of its functions.
- The Agency for Agricultural Assemblies and Modernization (Indonesian: Badan Perakitan dan Modernisasi Pertanian, or BrMP), is responsible for agricultural applied research, engineering, assembly, testing, dissemination, and application of modern agriculture in Indonesia. The agency belongs to the Ministry of Agriculture.
- The Ministry of Defense possessed, several research institutions:
  - Defense Technology Agency, which tasked for research and development of warfare technologies of the army, navy, and air force.
  - Defense Facilities Maintenance and Healthcare Agency, which tasked for research and development of defense pharmaceuticals, biological products, and vaccine production as one of its functions.
  - Defense Information and Intelligence Communication Agency, which tasked for source collection for military research purposes as one of its functions.
  - Center for Data and Information, which tasked for research and development for the Ministry of Defense specialized cipher, information systems, and applications.
- The Mineral Industry Agency (Indonesian: Badan Industri Mineral, or BIM), is responsible for research and development of strategic minerals resources for clean energy and defense purposes. This agency is under the President directly and headed by the Minister of Higher Education, Science, and Technology.

Indonesia has many universities. Among the most renowned are the University of Indonesia, the Bandung Institute of Technology and Gadjah Mada University, which offer science courses. Indonesia ranked 55th on the 2025 Global Innovation Index report up from 87th in 2021.

== Main areas ==
=== Biotechnology ===
In October 1994, the State created the Biotechnology Consortium (IBC) whose aim is to develop and use the contributions of biotechnology for the benefit of the population, the country, and the conservation of the environment. Around 34 government institutions work in the biotechnology sector. In 2005, the country hosted the BINASIA-Indonesia National Workshop to promote investment in this sector.

=== Food processing technology ===
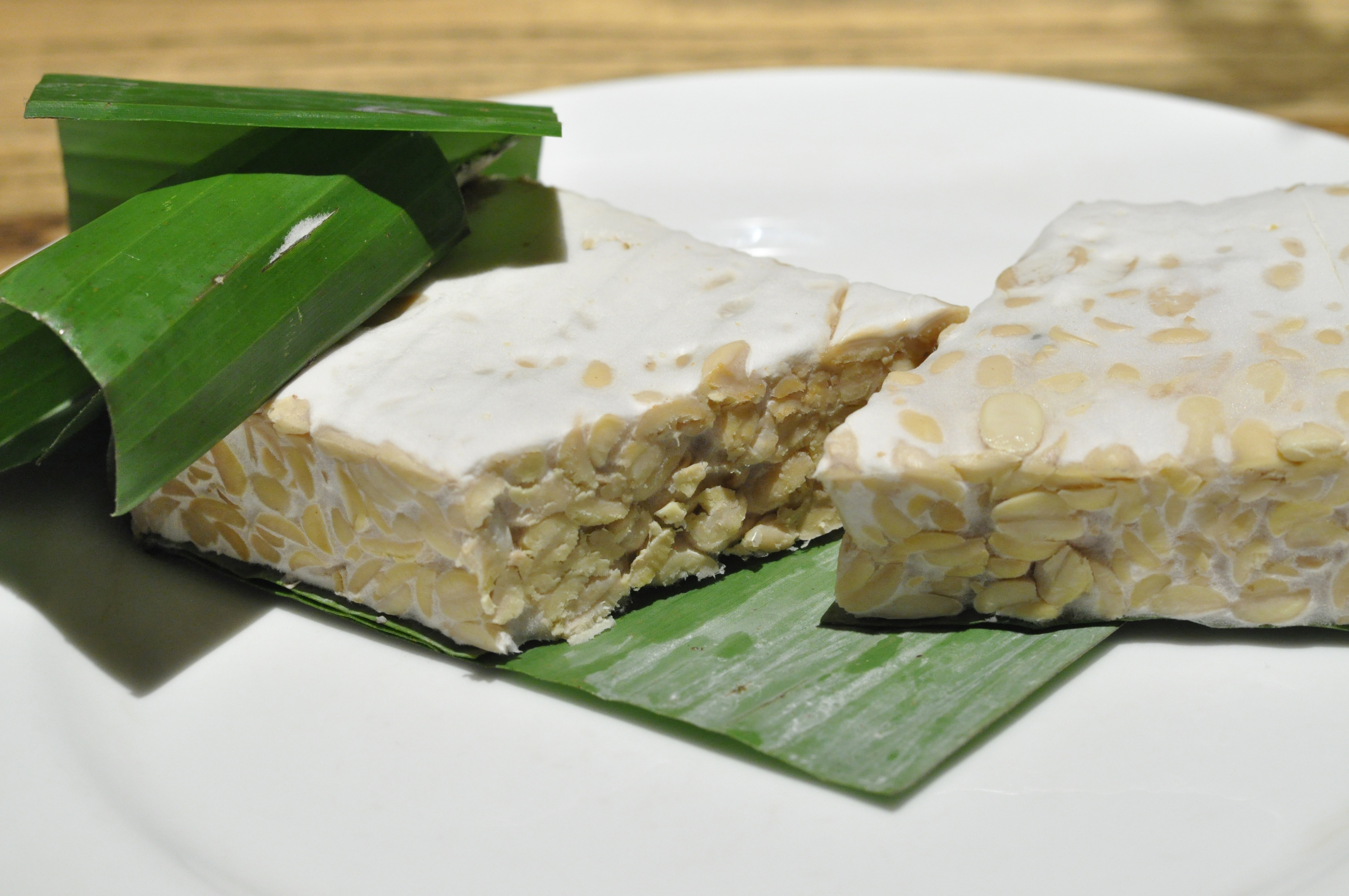
Indonesians has developed a long tradition of fermentation technique, among others are tempeh, oncom, tuak, brem and tapai.

Indonesians have also made various advances in food technology, due to the tropical climate in Indonesia teeming with various microbes. Indonesians have developed traditional knowledge in fermentation techniques, which resulted in the development of fermented foods such as tempeh, oncom, tapai, and also beverages like brem and tuak. Tempeh is made through natural culturing and a controlled fermentation process, which employs the fungi Rhizopus oligosporus or Rhizopus oryzae, The fungi binds soybeans into a cake form. It has higher content of protein, dietary fiber, and vitamins.

=== Construction technology ===
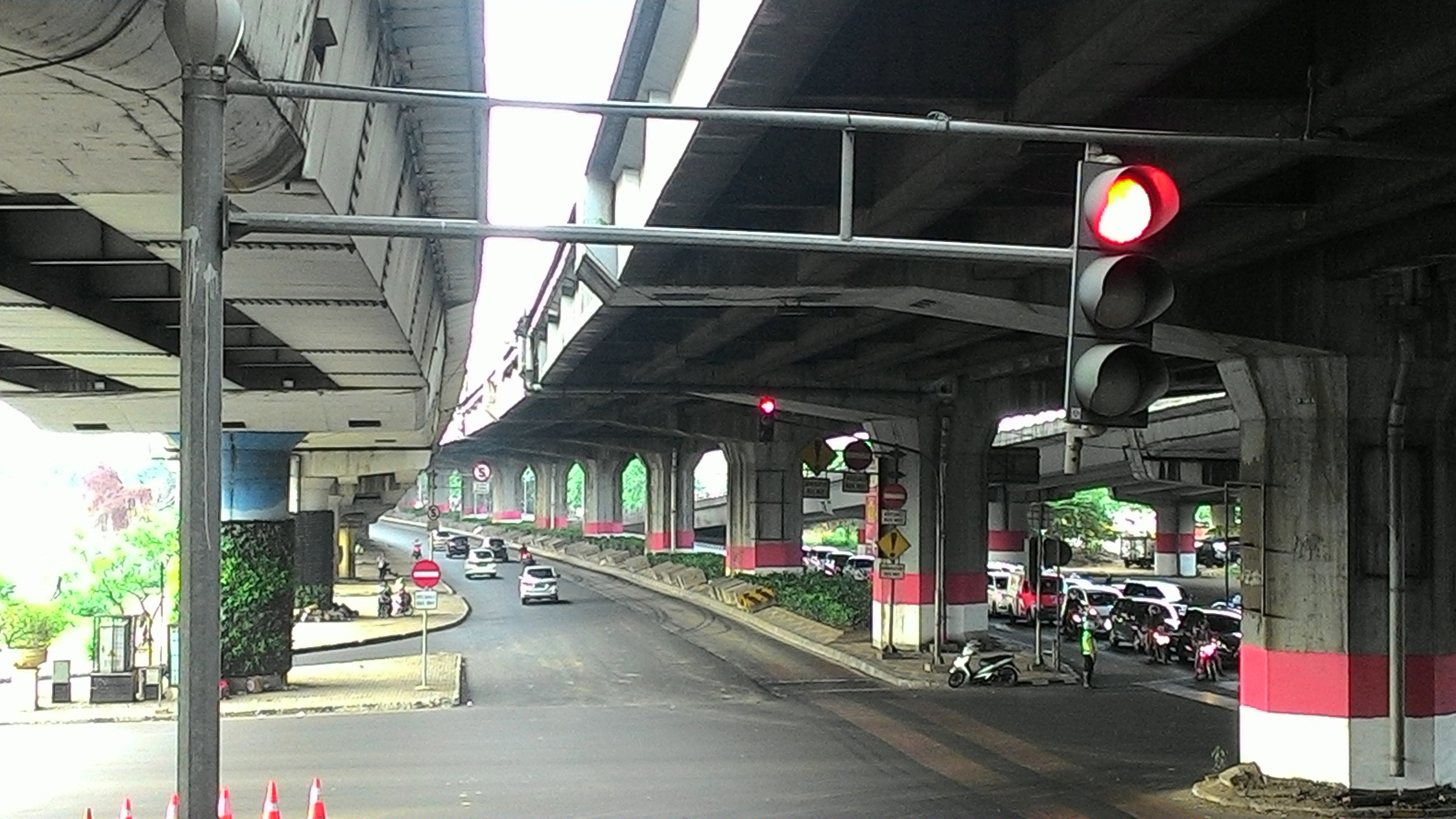
Elevated toll road on Jalan Ahmad Yani by pass, Jakarta, which employed the Sosrobahu construction technique that rotates the beam-supporting bar on each pylon

In the 1980s, Tjokorda Raka Sukawati, an Indonesian engineer, invented a road construction technique called Sosrobahu. It became popular afterwards and has since been widely used by many countries. The Sosrobahu technique allows long stretches of flyovers to be constructed above existing main roads and minimize disruptions to heavy traffic. It involves the construction of horizontal supports for the highway beside the existing road, which is then lifted and turned at a 90 degree angle before being placed on the top of the vertical supports. This forms the flyover pylons. The technology was exported to the Philippines, Malaysia, Thailand and Singapore. In 1995, a patent was granted to Indonesia.

The Cakar ayam construction, or literally means "chicken claw construction" is a technical engineering method for creating a more stable foundation that involves employing a concrete plate supported by pipes planted deep into the ground acted as "claws", invented by Ir. Sedijatmo in 1961. The technique can be applied on structures, roads and runways. The technical principle consists of a concrete plate foundation, which is supported and secured to the ground by pipes as "claws", which allows for a more stable construction and enables structures to be built on soft wet ground such as on swamps. The technique allows structures to be more rigid, stable and more durable against uneven weight distribution or uneven land declension.

The Konstruksi Sarang Laba-Laba (or Cobweb Construction in English) is a construction technique on the foundation of a building in the form of concrete with cobweb-shaped iron beams inside it. This construction technique was designed by Ir. Ryantori. The 4-story building that used the construction technique was proven to be earthquake-resistant during the earthquake in Aceh in 2004.

=== Aerospace and transportation ===
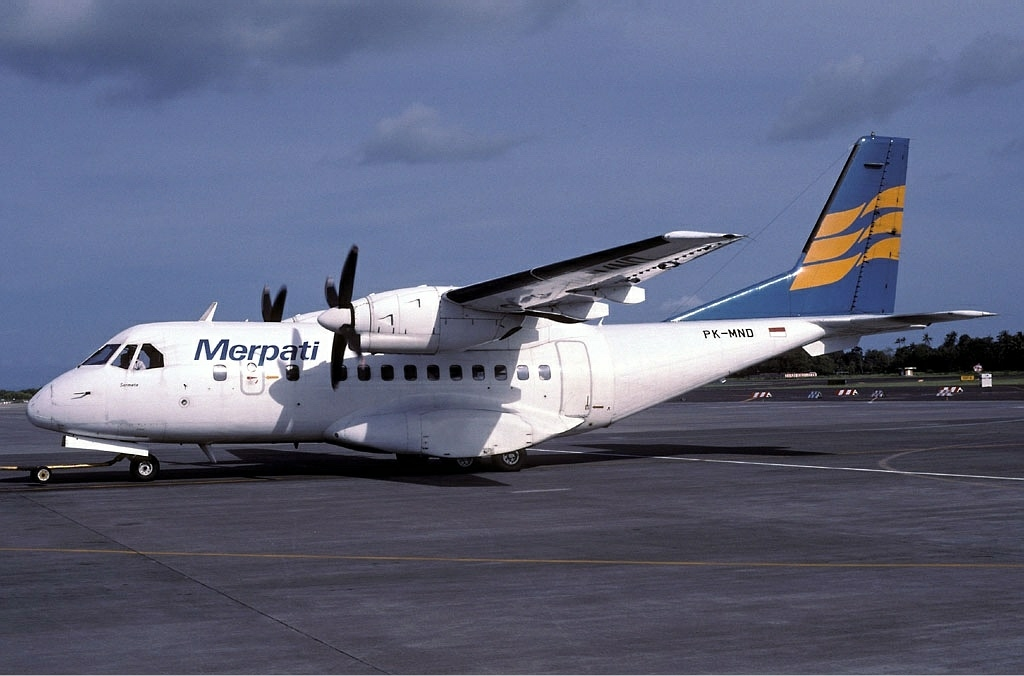
Merpati Nusantara's CN-235

Indonesia has a long history in developing military and small commuter aircraft. In fact, it is the only country in Southeast Asia to produce and develop its own aircraft. Its state-owned aircraft company (founded in 1976), Indonesian Aerospace (Indonesian: PT. Dirgantara Indonesia) has also produced aircraft components for Boeing and Airbus. Indonesian Aerospace, together with EADS CASA of Spain, also developed the CN-235 aircraft, which has been exported to many countries. B. J. Habibie, a former Indonesian president, played an important role in this achievement. While active as a professor in Germany, Habibie conducted many research assignments, producing theories on thermodynamics, constructions, and aerodynamics, known as the Habibie Factor, Habibie Theorem, and Habibie Method respectively. Indonesia also hopes to manufacture the South Korean KAI KF-X fighter. The latest development is N-219, a twin-engine 19-seater commuter airplane.

Wiweko Soepono, a former Garuda Indonesia director, is also known as inventor of the modern two-man cockpit design (Forward Facing Crew Cockpit/FFCC), for Garuda Indonesia Airbus A300 aircraft.

Furthermore, Indonesia has a railway industry with its state-owned train manufacturing company, the Indonesian Railway Industry (Indonesian: PT Industri Kereta Api), located in Madiun, East Java. Since 1982, the company has been producing passenger train wagons, freight wagons and other railway technologies, exporting to many countries such as Malaysia and Bangladesh.

=== Logistics technology ===
Indonesia has become a hub for disruptive technology in the logistics sector. Mobile app-based companies like GoTo and Deliveree have had a large impact on the way parcel, goods, and freight are transported around the country. Logistics technology adoption in the country has been substantial with GoTo reporting 100 million monthly active users across its multiple service lines including transportation services for passengers, food, parcels, goods, and freight.

=== Information, communication and digital technology ===
Indonesia was one of few countries during the 1970s to own their own communication satellite. Since 1976, a series of satellites named Palapa were built and launched in the United States for Indonesia's state-owned telecommunication company, Indosat. LAPAN, Indonesia's space agency, has expressed a desire to put satellites in orbit with native launch vehicles by 2040.

In Internet technology, an Indonesian information technology scientist, Onno W. Purbo developed RT/RW-net, a community-based internet infrastructure which provides affordable Internet access to people in rural areas.

In 2010s digital economy began to develop and continue to thrive in Indonesia. Notable example include Gojek; started in 2010 as a call center to connect consumers to courier delivery and two-wheeled ride-hailing services. Today, it grow into a Southeast Asian on-demand multi-service platform and digital payment technology group. Another digital economy and service developed in Indonesia includes online marketplaces such as Tokopedia and Blibli.

=== Robotics ===
Indonesian students have a good record of winning many international competitions in science and technology. In 2009, the robotics team from Indonesian Computer University won the gold medal in the "open fire-fighting autonomous robot" category at the Robogames in San Francisco, United States. In 2010, they successfully defended their title. Two years earlier, another robotics team from the Tenth of November Institute of Technology won third place in Robocon 2008, a robotics contest hosted by the Asia-Pacific Broadcast Union (ABU) in Pune, India.

== Notable people ==
- B. J. Habibie, German-trained professor in aerospace engineering. Produced theories known as the Habibie Theorem, Habibie Factor, and Habibie Method. Later he became the third president of Indonesia.
- Bambang Hidayat, former vice-president of the International Astronomical Union.
- Onno W. Purbo, Internet and information technology expert. Well known for his design on RT/RW-net, a community-based Internet solution for poor people.
- Yohanes Surya, physics scientist and professor.
- Moedomo Soedigdomarto, one of the first Indonesians to obtain a Ph.D. in mathematics.

== See also ==
- List of Indonesian inventions and discoveries
- Nuclear power in Indonesia
- Indonesian Institute of Sciences

== Bibliography ==
- The Science and Technology System of the Republic of Indonesia,, UNESCO.
