= Indonesian Cyber Force =

The Indonesian Cyber Force (Indonesian: Tentara Nasional Indonesia Angkatan Siber) is a proposed future branch of the Indonesian National Armed Forces (Tentara Nasional Indonesia, TNI). It will be the Cyberwarfare arm of the TNI. The formation of the branch was ordered by President Joko Widodo on 3 September 2024 and currently in preparation by the Commander of the Indonesian Armed Forces, General Agus Subiyanto.

Once fully established, the Indonesian Cyber Force will become the fourth branch of the TNI, restoring the number of TNI branches to four. Previously, during the New Order era, the Indonesian National Police served as the fourth branch of the TNI until its separation in 2000.

== History ==
On 7 August 2023, National Resilience Institute Governor Andi Widjajanto advised the government to establish a cyber force to reform and modernize the armed forces. This call was renewed on 18 September 2023, in response to cyberattacks by actors from four countries that posed significant disadvantages to Indonesia.

The need for a cyber force was raised again following a serious hack of the National Data Centers in 2024, which resulted in a ransomware infestation affecting the centers.

On 16 August 2024, the Speaker of the People's Consultative Assembly, Bambang Soesatyo, emphasized the need for the formation of a Cyber Force to address cyberattacks. He referenced similar units that already exist in other countries, such as Cyber and Electromagnetic Command (Malaysia), Digital and Intelligence Service (Singapore), and United States Cyber Command (USA).

Before the formation of the Indonesian Cyber Force, the National Cyber and Crypto Agency served as Indonesia's primary civilian cyber defense agency. On the military side, the TNI had several cyber units, including the Indonesian National Armed Forces Cyber Unit, Army Cyber Unit, Navy Cyber Unit, and Air Forces Cyber Unit. Additionally, the Ministry of Defense operated its own Center for Cyber Defense under the Defense Information and Communication Agency.

On 3 September 2024, President Joko Widodo instructed General Agus Subiyanto to establish the Indonesian Cyber Force. The following day, on 4 September 2024, the Coordinating Minister of Political, Legal, and Security Affairs Hadi Tjahjanto also affirmed the formation of the branch, highlighting the increasing threats posed by future unconventional and digital warfare. On the same day, General Agus Subiyanto announced that the planned Cyber Force would differ in structure from other branches of the TNI. He noted that the Cyber Force will likely recruit skilled civilians or civil servants with expertise in relevant fields. The TNI will prioritize individuals with advanced technology and information knowledge, particularly cybersecurity. This approach is considered practical, as training cybersecurity experts would require significant time and resources, making it a lengthy process for the TNI.

On 6 September 2024, lawmakers recognized that the addition of another branch to the TNI would require not only the creation of a law for the Cyber Force and revisions to the existing Armed Forces Law but also a constitutional amendment, as the number and names of the TNI branches are explicitly stated in the constitution.

On 12 September 2024, President Joko Widodo expressed that the Indonesian Cyber Force would be realized in Prabowo's administration.

On 25 November 2024, Prabowo's administration, through Minister of Defense Sjafrie Sjamsoeddin, chose not to form the Indonesian Cyber Force as a separate branch. However, the Indonesian Air Force is interested in developing a cyber subbranch and plans to create a Cyber and Space Defense Engineering Program within the Indonesian Air Force Academy, to train future cyber military officers.

On 18 November 2025, DPR requested an assessment to make possible of an amendment of the constitution to add additional branches of the military, including cyber force.
