= Indonesian Peace and Security Center =

The Indonesian Peace and Security Center (Indonesian: Pusat Perdamaian dan Keamanan Indonesia, IPSC) is an integrated office, training, research, and development complex of various Indonesian military and civilian agencies founded by President of Indonesia Susilo Bambang Yudhoyono from 2010 to 2014. The complex is the largest peacekeeping training centre in Southeast Asia, inaugurated on 7 April 2014 in Bogor, West Java. It aims to train officers for United Nations peacekeeping tasks and covers an area of nearly 270 hectares in Sentul, 30 kilometers from Jakarta. The complex also provides training in counterterrorism and disaster relief activities and includes facilities for standby military personnel awaiting emergency deployment. The establishment was funded by Indonesian government, with significant United States of America and Australia financial aid.

The facility owned by the Ministry of Defense and administered thru the ministry Defense Regional Management Center (Indonesian: Pusat Pengelolaan Kawasan, Puslola Kawasan).

== Tenants ==
- Ministry of Defence
  - Indonesia Defense University [id]
- Indonesian National Armed Forces
  - Center for Peacekeeping Mission
  - Center for Standby Forces and Deployment Readiness
  - Center for Military Sports
- National Agency for Disaster Countermeasure
  - Center for Disaster Countermeasure Education and Training
- National Counter Terrorism Agency
  - Center for Terrorism Eradication and Deradicalization
- Agency for Language Development and Cultivation, Ministry of Primary and Secondary Education
  - Center for Language Strategic Development and Language Diplomacy (disestablished 31 December 2019)
  - Center for Language and Literature Development and Protection
