= Robert G. Bartle =

American mathematician (1927–2003)

- Born: November 20, 1927; Kansas City, Missouri
- Died: September 18, 2003 (aged 75); Ann Arbor, Michigan
- Education: University of Chicago
- Known for: Real Analysis
- Scientific career
- Fields: Mathematics
- Workplaces: University of Illinois Urbana-Champaign, Eastern Michigan University
- Doctoral advisor: Lawrence Graves
- Doctoral students: Moedomo Soedigdomarto

Robert Gardner Bartle (November 20, 1927 – September 18, 2003) was an American mathematician specializing in real analysis. He is known for writing the popular textbooks The Elements of Real Analysis (1964), The Elements of Integration (1966), and Introduction to Real Analysis (2011) with Donald R. Sherbert, published by John Wiley & Sons.

Bartle was born in Kansas City, Missouri, and was the son of Glenn G. Bartle and Wanda M. Bartle. He was married to Doris Sponenberg Bartle (born 1927) from 1952 to 1982 and they had two sons, James A. Bartle (born 1955) and John R. Bartle (born 1958). He was on the faculty of the Department of Mathematics at the University of Illinois from 1955 to 1990.

Bartle was Executive Editor of Mathematical Reviews from 1976 to 1978 and from 1986 to 1990. From 1990 to 1999 he taught at Eastern Michigan University. In 1997, he earned a writing award from the Mathematical Association of America for his paper "Return to the Riemann Integral".
