= Moedomo Soedigdomarto =

Moedomo Soedigdomarto, also spelled Mudomo Sudigdomarto, (29 November 1927, Magetan – 5 November 2005, Bandung) was an Indonesian mathematician, educator and professor at the Bandung Institute of Technology, of which he was rector.

Soedigdomarto was one of the first Indonesians to obtain a Ph.D. in mathematics, which he earned from the University of Illinois Urbana-Champaign, with a dissertation titled "A Representation Theory for the Laplace Transform of Vector-Valued Functions", in 1959 at the age of 32, under the orientation of Robert Gardner Bartle.

Soedigdomarto was the first Indonesian to have a paper recorded in Mathematical Reviews (Moedomo and J. J. Uhl, Jr. "Radon-Nikodym theorems for the Bochner and Pettis integrals" published in the Pacific Journal of Mathematics in 1971).
