= Sosrobahu =

Road construction technique

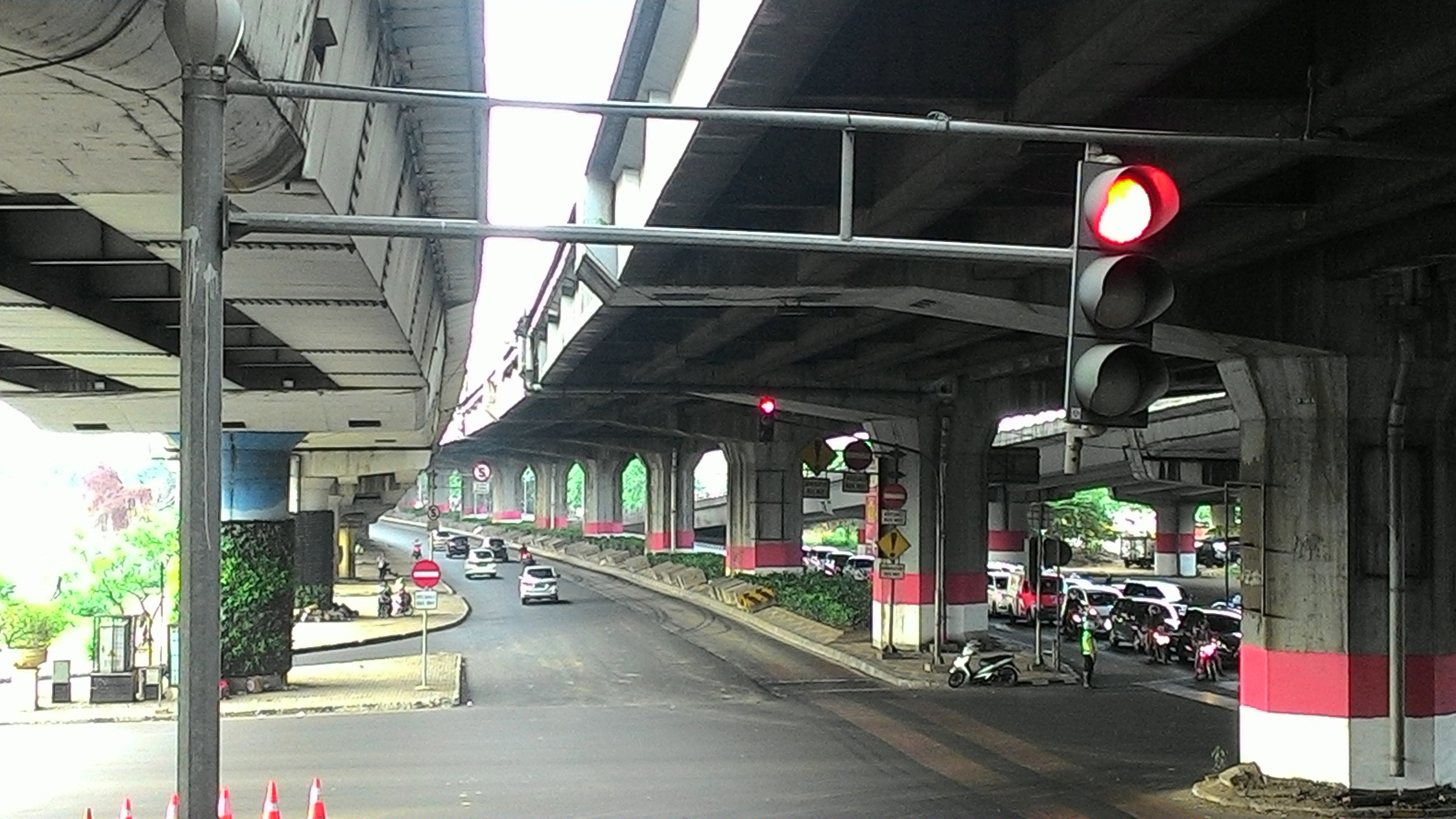
Elevated toll road on Jalan Ahmad Yani by pass, Jakarta, Indonesia. The elevated road used the Sosrobahu construction technique that rotates the beam-supporting bar on each pylon.

Sosrobahu is a construction technique that allows long stretches of elevated roadway to be constructed above existing major roads with minimum disruption to traffic. The technique was designed by Indonesian engineer Tjokorda Raka Sukawati and involves the construction of the horizontal supports for the highway beside the existing road, which are then lifted and turned 90 degrees before being placed on the top of the vertical supports to form the flyover pylons.

The term Sosrobahu was derived from Old Javanese; meaning "thousand shoulders".

== History ==
=== Creation ===
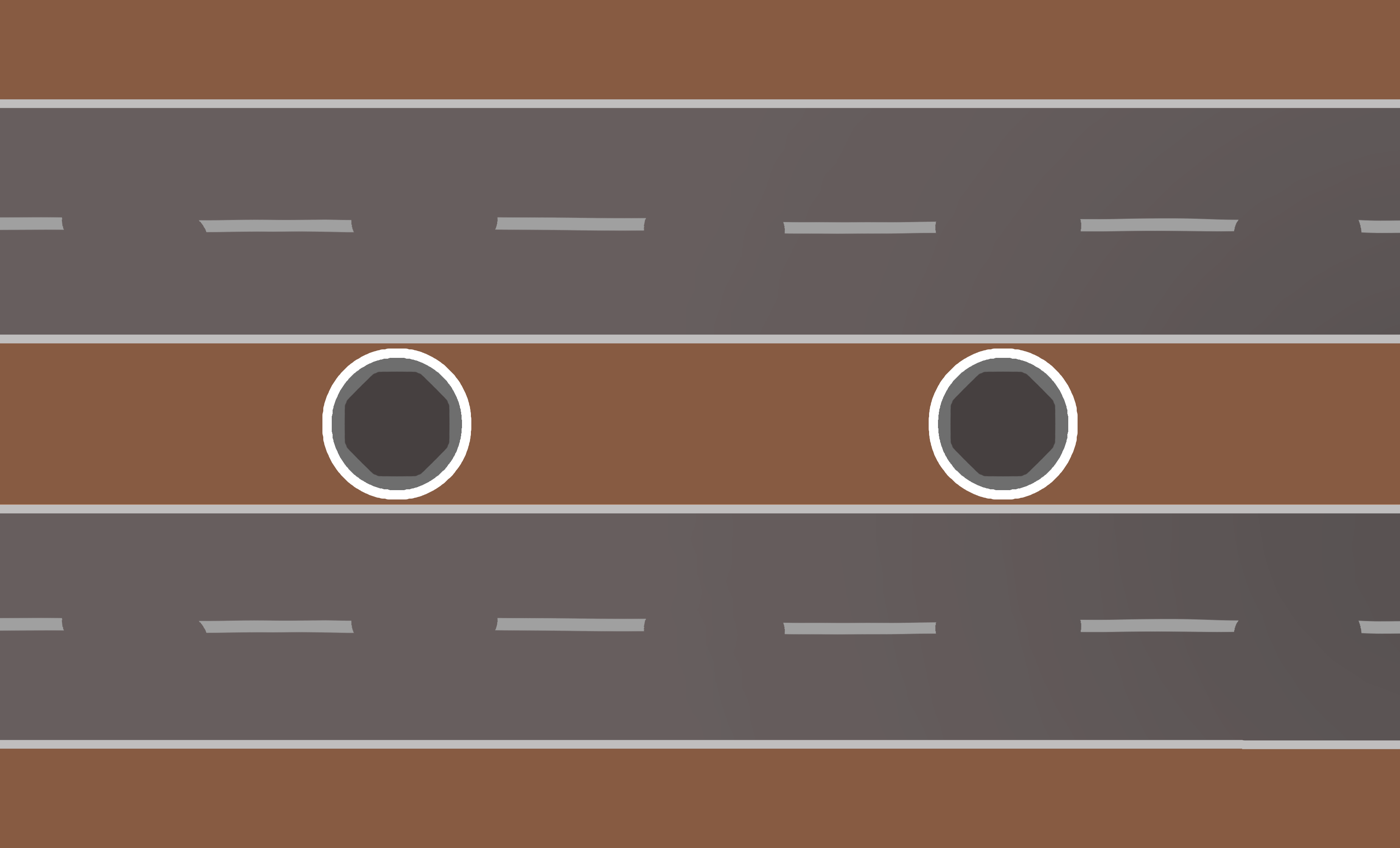
The vertical supports were built between two parallel roads.

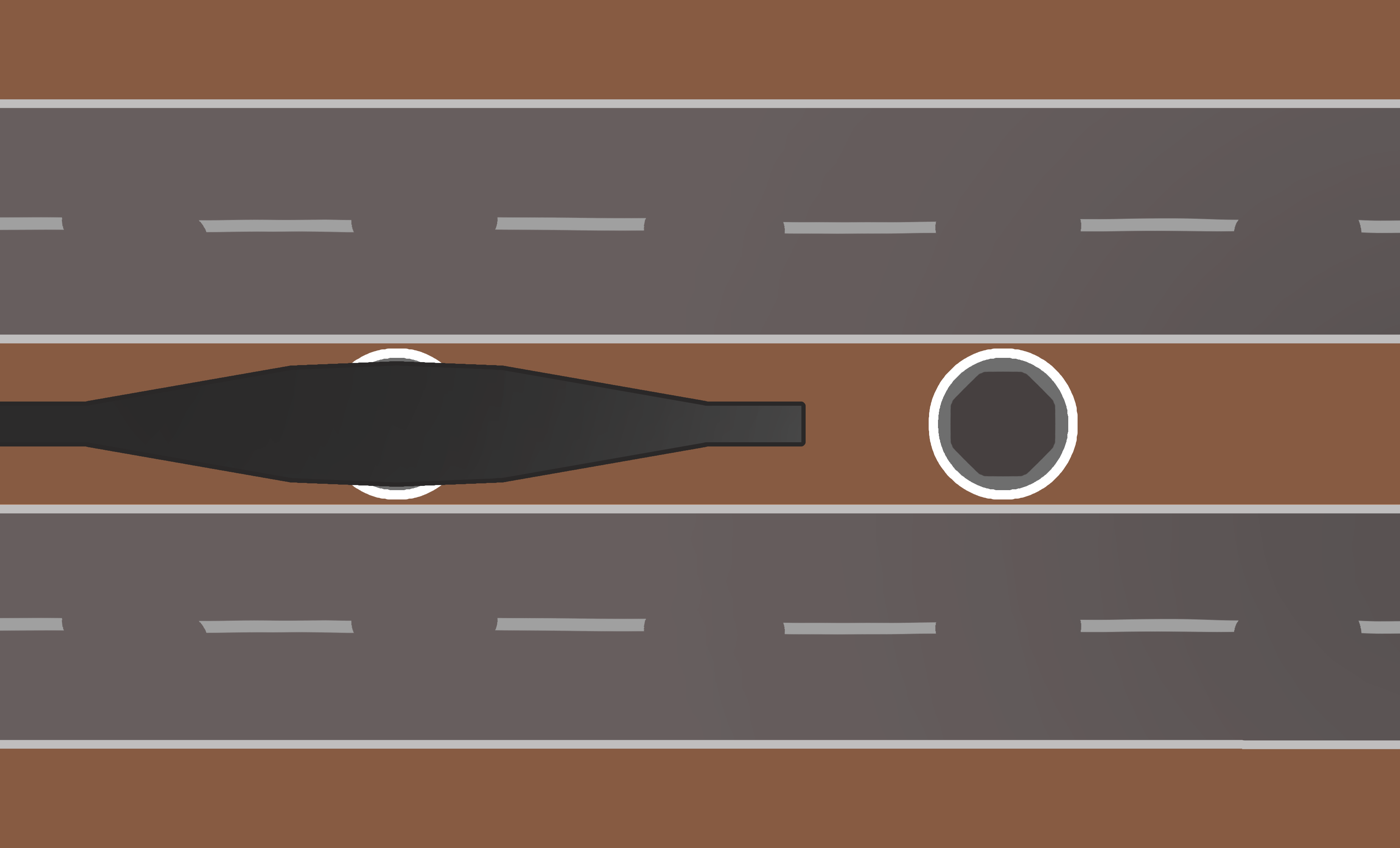
Horizontal supports were then placed.

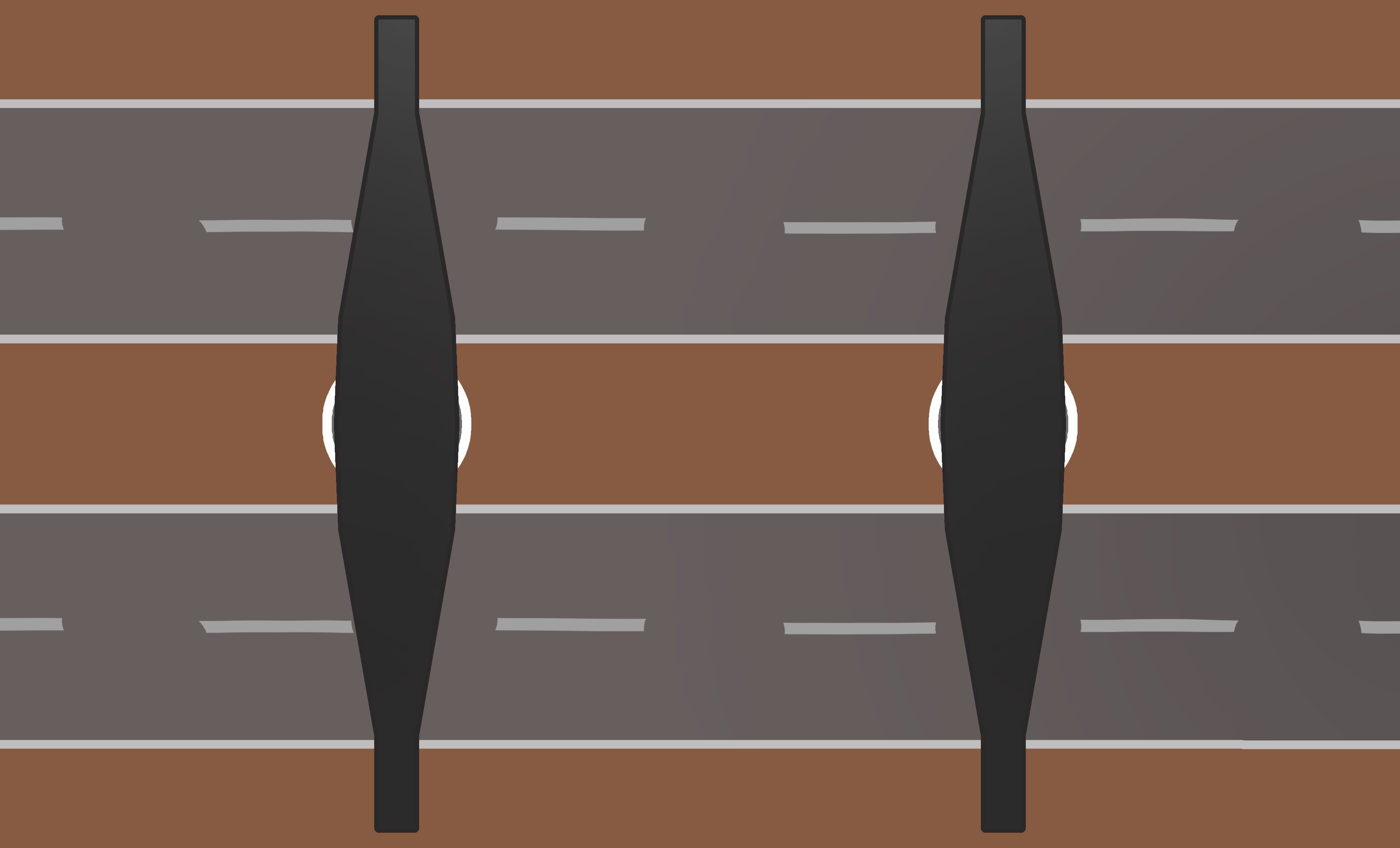
The pier head (on the vertical supports) were then rotated.

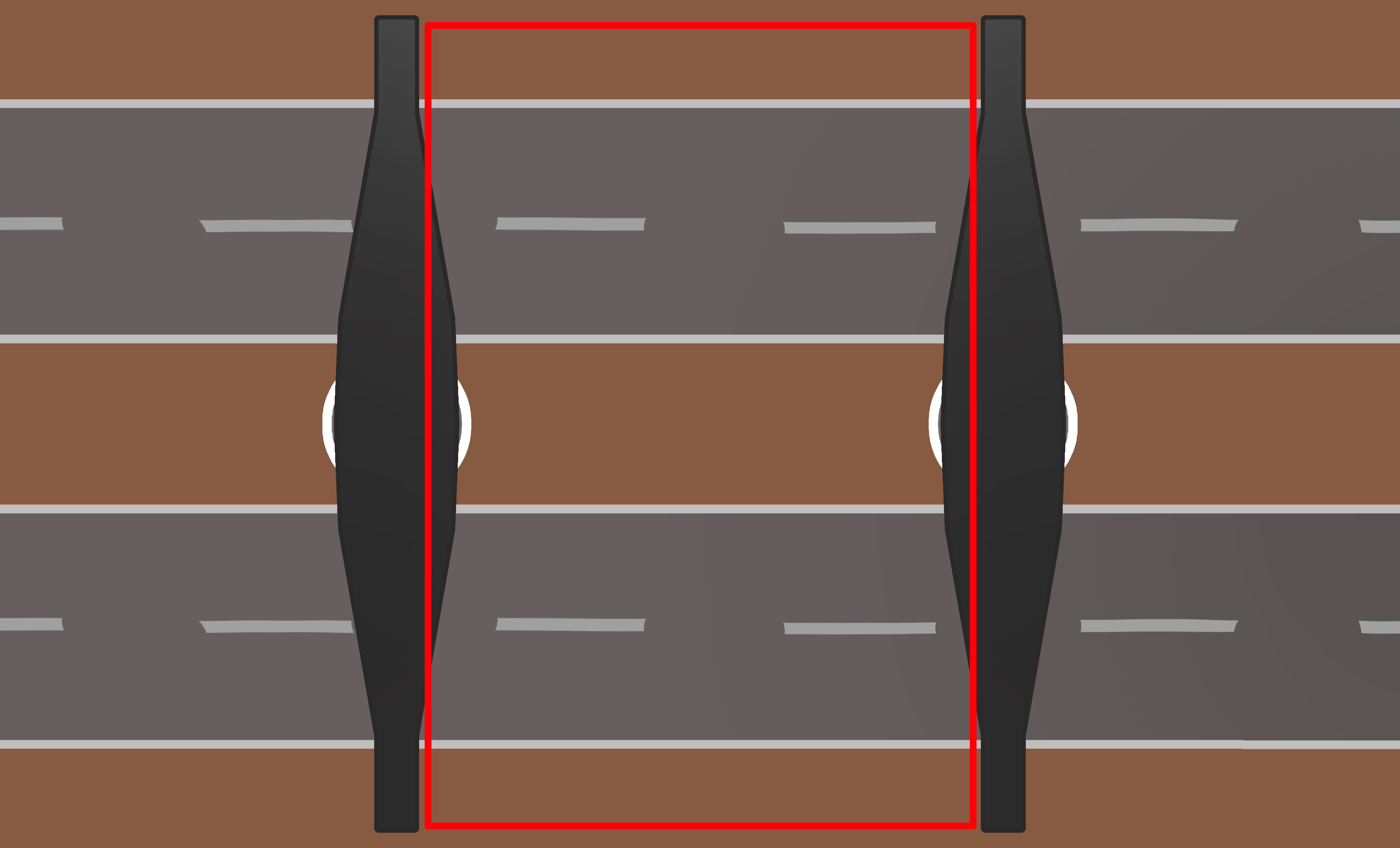
The red rectangle shows the supported area for the construction of the flyover; it can be filled with concrete girders. The flyover is usually built going parallel with the roads below it.

One day, Tjokorda was working on his 1974 Mercedes-Benz, which he had jacked up so that the back two wheels were supported on the slippery floor of the garage where some oil had been accidentally spilled. When the car was pushed, it pivoted with the jack as the axis. He noted that, when there is no friction, it is easy to move the heaviest of objects. This event made him realize that a hydraulic pump could be used to lift heavy objects.

Tjokorda conducted trials with cylinders 20 cm in diameter converted into a hydraulic lift and loaded with 80 tonnes of concrete. The weight was successfully lifted and turned slightly, but could not then be lowered as the position of the hydraulic jack had shifted. Later, Tjokorda revised the design; after testing, the hydraulic jack stayed stable even with the full weight of the concrete above it.

After the trials, Tjokorda finalised his design called the LBPH (Landasan Putar Bebas Hambatan; Free Moving Platform) which consisted of two concrete discs with a diameter of 80 cm enclosed in a container. Although only 5 cm thick, the discs are capable of supporting a weight of 625 tonnes each. Between the two plates is pumped lubricating oil. A rubber seal around the edges of the plates protected against the oil escaping under the high forces experienced during the lift. The oil in the container was connected to a hydraulic pump through a small pipe.

=== Usages ===
In the 1980s, during the construction of an elevated toll project above Jalan A. Yani. between Cawang and Tanjung Priok, Tjokorda had the idea of initially erecting the concrete pier shafts and then building the poured concrete pier heads in the centre lane, parallel to the existing roadway, and then raising and turning the pier heads 90 degrees into place. Though the pier heads weigh approximately 480 tonnes each.

On 27 July 1988, at 22:00 GMT+7, a 440-tonne concrete was moved using a hydraulic pump that was pressurized to 78 kgf/cm² (7.6 MPa). The pier head, despite a lack of iron supports, was lifted and placed on top of the pier shaft. The longest stretch of overpass built using this technique is in Metro Manila, Philippines, at the Metro Manila Skyway. In the Philippines, 298 supports have been erected, while in Kuala Lumpur, the figure is 135.

== Naming and patent ==
In November 1989, President Soeharto of Indonesia gave the name Sosrobahu. The name was taken from a character in the Ramayana, and means 'thousand shoulders' in Old Javanese. The Indonesian patent was granted in 1995, while the Japanese patent was granted in 1992. The technology has also been used in projects in the Philippines, Malaysia, Thailand, and Singapore.
