= Tjokorda Raka Sukawati =

- Born: 3 May 1931; Ubud, Gianyar, Bali, Dutch East Indies
- Died: 11 November 2014 (aged 83); Ubud, Gianyar, Bali, Indonesia
- Education: Bandung Institute of Technology (B.Eng.); Gadjah Mada University (Dr)
- Occupation: Engineer
- Known for: Invented Sosrobahu

Tjokorda Raka Sukawati (3 May 1931 – 11 November 2014) was an Indonesian engineer who invented Sosrobahu, a road engineering technique which facilitates the construction of overpasses without disrupting traffic flow during construction. He was born and died in Ubud, Bali, and in 2019 was conferred as an honorary T. Washington Fellow in science posthumously.

A biography about Sukawati titled Melangkah Tanpa Lelah (English: "Step Without Tiring") was released in 2021.

== Biography ==
Tjokorda Raka Sukawati was born in Ubud, Bali on 3 May 1931. He was the grandson of Tjokorda Gede Sukawati, who was once the ruler of Ubud.
