= Defense Information, Communication, and Intelligence Agency =

Defense Information and Communication Agency (Bainfokomhan)
- Badan Informasi dan Komunikasi Pertahanan

Agency overview
- Formed: 17 June 2022 (current form)
- Preceding agencies: Strategic Defense Installation Agency; Defense Data and Information Center
- Jurisdiction: Indonesia
- Agency executive: Major General Robi Herbawan, Head
- Parent department: Ministry of Defense
- Website: www.kemhan.go.id/bainstrahan/

The Defense Information, Communication, and Intelligence Agency (Indonesian: Badan Informasi dan Komunikasi Intelijen Pertahanan, BIK Intelhan) is a Ministry of Defense subordinate agency tasked with providing support for the ministry and other related agencies with performing military cyber defense, performing defense intelligence, collection of naval, army, and air force technological designs and specifications for aiding the Indonesian military research and development, and domestic and foreign military intelligence communication.

The agency, along with the Agency for Defense Technology, is one of the few state research and development agencies that not being liquidated to the National Research and Innovation Agency.

== History ==
Historically, prior the formation of the Bainfokomhan, there was Strategic Defense Installation Agency (Indonesian: Badan Instalasi Strategis Pertahanan, Bainstrahan), which tasked as managing agency responsible in managing strategic installations. The agency subsequently dismantled in favor of Bainfokomhan. Management of strategic installations subsequently transferred into smaller center, Regional Management Center, under the Ministry of Defense directly by Ministry of Defense Decree No. 1/2024. Large part of former Bainstrahan later combined with the Defense Data and Information Center (Indonesian: Pusat Data dan Informasi Pertahanan, Pusdatikhan), forming the Defense Information and Communication Agency (Indonesian: Badan Informasi dan Komunikasi Pertahanan, Bainfokomhan).

Major General Yudi Abrimantyo was the last head of the Bainstrahan, when he was appointed on 26 August 2021. He led Bainstrahan until Bainstrahan dismantlement on 17 June 2022 and subsequent transformation into Bainfokomhan. He led the Bainfokomhan until 2024 until his promotion.

On 9 July 2024, Major General Robi Herbawan replaced Lieutenant General Yudi Abrimantyo as Head of the Bainfokomhan, while Lieutenant General Yudi promoted to be Head of the Strategic Intelligence Agency.

On 5 August 2025, by Presidential Decree No. 85/2025, BIK Intelhan formed from Bainfokomhan. Center for Data and Information pulled out from BIK Intelhan coordination and placed to the ministry again.

== Organization ==
Following the Ministry of Defense Decrees No. 30/2025 and No. 13/2026, the full structure of BIK Intelhan is as follows:

- Office of the Head of BIK Intelhan
- Office of the Secretary of BIK Intelhan
  - Division of Programs and Reporting
  - Division of Information, Archives, and Administration
  - Division of General Affairs
- Center of Defense Intelligence Analysis
  - Division of Domestic Affairs
  - Division of Asia-Pacific Affairs
  - Division of America, Europe, and Africa Affairs
- Center of Cyber Defense and Defense Intelligence Technology
  - Division of Defense Cybersecurity
  - Division of Defense Cyberoperations
  - Division of Defense Technological Intelligence
- Center of Defense Intelligence Communication and Support
  - Division of Strategy and System
  - Division of Intelligence and Cyberintelligence Partnership
  - Division of Technical Intelligence Communication
