= Agency for Defense Technology =

Indonesian government agency

Agency for Defense Technology (Batekhan)
- Badan Pengembangan Kebijakan dan Teknologi Pertahanan

Agency overview
- Formed: 24 August 1967 (as Lalitbanghankam); 23 August 2000 (as Balitbanghan); 5 August 2025 (current form)
- Jurisdiction: Indonesia
- Agency executive: Major General Heru Sudarminto, Head
- Parent department: Ministry of Defense
- Website: www.kemhan.go.id/balitbang/

The Agency for Defense Technology (Indonesian: Badan Teknologi Pertahanan, Batekhan) is an agency subordinate to the Indonesian Ministry of Defense. The agency tasked to perform research and development in defense and military affairs.

The agency can be considered as military counterpart of the National Research and Innovation Agency (Badan Riset dan Inovasi Nasional, BRIN).

== History ==
=== 1967-1983 ===
On 24 August 1967, Suharto signed Presidential Decision No. 132/1967 (On Changes in Organization Fundamentals and Procedures in Field of Defense and Security). The decision reorganized the Republic of Indonesia Armed Forces. It was decided to form a military research institute within the Armed Forces, Defense and Security Research and Development Institute (Indonesian: Lembaga Penelitian and Pengembangan Pertahanan dan Keamanan, Lalitbanghankam). Lalitbanghankam was placed under the Armed Forces HQ. However, due to communication and command issues at that time due to Armed Forces and Department of Defense and Security were not integrated, Suharto later signed Presidential Decision No. 79/1969 on 4 October 1969, which amend the previous decision. The new decision combined the Department of Defense and Security with Armed Forces by stating that Armed Forces is organic part of Department of Defense and Security and core of National Defense and Security System formulated by Suharto. As result, Lalitbanghankam effectively integrated to Department of Defense and Security and become Research and Development Center (Indonesian: Pusat Penelitian dan Pengembangan, Puslitbang) under the Department of Defense and Security. On 18 February 1974, the Puslitbang become Research and Development Center for Defense and Security (Indonesian: Pusat Penelitian dan Pengembangan Pertahanan dan Keamanan, Puslitbang Hankam).

By passage of the Law No. 20/1982 (On State Defense and Security Fundamentals), the law reformed Department of Defense and Security/Republic of Indonesia Armed Forces by liquidating and reorganizing organization of the institution. Puslitbang Hankam was reorganized by the law. On 5 October 1983, Puslitbang Hankam fused with elements from Bureau of Data Collection and Processing (Indonesian: Biro Pengumpulan dan Pengolahan Data, Biro Pullahta) of Department of Defense and Security General Secretariat into a new agency, Agency for Industrial and Technology Research and Development of Department of Defense and Security (Indonesian: Badan Penelitian dan Pengembangan Industri dan Teknologi Departemen Pertahanan dan Keamanan, BPPIT Dephankam). BPPIT Dephankam was placed under Department of Defense and Security.

=== 1983-2009 ===
BPPIT Dephankam was operated for next 16 years. On 26 October 1999, Abdurrachman Wahid, issued Presidential Decision No. 355/M/1999 on inauguration of his cabinet. His cabinet separated Armed Forces and Department of Defense. The "Security" part was separated from the then Department of Defense name, likely to erase the uneasiness from memory of Suharto's New Order regime. Thus, BPPIT Dephankam become Agency for Industrial and Technology Research and Development of Department of Defense (Indonesian: Badan Penelitian dan Pengembangan Industri dan Teknologi Departemen Pertahanan, BPPIT Dephan). BPPIT Dephan later renamed to Agency Research and Development of Department of Defense (Indonesian: Badan Penelitian dan Pengembangan Departemen Pertahanan, Balitbang Dephan) on 23 August 2000.

With issuance of Presidential Decree No. 47/2009 by Susilo Bambang Yudhoyono on standardization of ministry names, "Department" word ditched and replaced with "Ministry". While the ministry now named Ministry of Defense, the agency now named Defense Research and Development Agency (Indonesian: Badan Penelitian dan Pengembangan Kementerian Pertahanan, lit. 'Ministry of Defense Research and Development Agency', Balitbang Kemhan or Balitbanghan).

=== 2009-2022 ===
Balitbanghan was operated until 2022, until finally the agency was also targeted to be liquidated by Indonesian government in favor of National Research and Innovation Agency (Indonesian: Badan Riset dan Inovasi Nasional, BRIN). In January 2022, BRIN decided only focused in research on civilian affairs for flexibility and easiness to get partner in research collaborations. Research in military affairs and defense and security affairs decided to be left out due to critical position and national security interests and reasons. As the result, only Balitbanghan that left out from the integration of ministerial research and development agencies into BRIN, although part of the researchers transferred into BRIN. The decision also left research and development agencies under Indonesian National Armed Forces not to be integrated. The decision also led into various units and research formerly owned by LAPAN and BPPT which focused on military research and defense and security affairs being left out and relinquished to Ministry of Defense.

There was a proposed plan to form Defense Acquisition Institute (Indonesian: Lembaga Akuisisi Pertahanan), a military counterpart of BRIN, which intended to integrate all military research and development agencies in response of the decision. On 2 March 2022, Ministry of Defense and BRIN signed the MoU for research collaboration to bridge and closing the gap between military and civilian researchers. While the MoU was signed, on 17 June 2022, the formation of such agency came into fruition with formation of BPKTP thru Presidential Decree No. 94/2022.

=== 2023 ===
On 2 February 2023, Air Marshal Hendrikus Haris Haryanto appointed as the first Head of the BPKTP. He replaced Air Vice Marshal Julexi Tambayong, the last Head of Balitbanghan. Air Marshal Hendrikus Haris Haryanto is former military aide-de-camp of the Vice President Boediono.

=== 2025 ===
On 5 August 2025, BPKTP replaced by Batekhan.

== Lineage ==
No	Date		Name	Parent Organization
No	Foundation Date	Dissolved	Name	Parent Organization
1	24 August 1967	4 October 1969	Lalitbanghankam	Republic of Indonesia Armed Forces HQ
2	4 October 1969	18 February 1974	Puslitbang	Department of Defense and Security
3	18 February 1974	5 October 1983	Puslitbanghankam	Department of Defense and Security
4	5 October 1983	26 October 1999	BPPIT Dephankam	Department of Defense and Security
5	26 October 1999	29 December 2000	BPPIT Dephan	Department of Defense
6	29 December 2000	3 November 2009	Balitbang Dephan	Department of Defense
7	3 November 2009	17 June 2022	Balitbanghan	Ministry of Defense
8	17 June 2022	5 August 2025	BPKTP	Ministry of Defense
9	5 August 2025		Batekhan	Ministry of Defense

== Organization ==
Following the Ministry of Defense Decrees No. 30/2025 and 13/2026, the full structure of Batekhan is as follows:

- Office of the Head of Batekhan
- Office of the Secretary of Batekhan
  - Division of Programs and Reporting
  - Division of Information, Archives, and Administration
  - Division of General Affairs
  - Division of Technological Partnership
- Center for Land Warfare Technology
  - Division of Vehicle Research
  - Division of Armament Research
  - Division of Logistic, Electronics, and Communication Research
- Center for Naval Warfare Technology
  - Division of Ship Research
  - Division of Electronic Armament Research
  - Division of Naval Logistics Research
- Center for Air Warfare Technology
  - Division of Airplane Research
  - Division of Air Weaponry System Research
  - Division of Logistics and Electronics Research

== Command, Coordination, and Limitation ==
In accordance with Ministry of Defense Decree No. 30/2025, despite being formally an agency reported directly to the Minister of Defense by the Ministry of Defense structure, Batekhan activities is under monitoring and supervision of Sub-directorate of Defense Research and Development Planning, Directorate of Defense Development Planning, General Directorate II (Defense Planning) of the Ministry of Defense. The research outputs of Batekhan must fulfilled Ministry of Defense's standards, which regulated by Sub-directorate of Defense Material Development, Directorate of Material, General Directorate IV (Defense Power) of the Ministry of Defense.

Batekhan research scope also not without limitation. Ministry of Defense Decree No. 30/2025 sets limits in several subjects that fall into different parts of the ministry. By Ministry of Defense Decree No. 30/2025, some parts of the ministry also have research functions:

1. Research and development of defense pharmaceuticals, biological products, and vaccine production is fall into Defense Facilities Maintenance and Sustainment Agency
2. Offensive cyber operations capability development and technology intelligence is fall into Defense Information, Communication, and Intelligence Agency
3. Research and development of Ministry of Defense cipher, information systems, and applications is fall into the Ministry's Center for Data and Information.

== Research Activities ==
As military research agency, much extent of Batekhan research activity is unknown. However, excerpt of its research products is available. The excerpt covered 2011-2018 research of Batekhan during Balitbanghan period. Batekhan research activities divided into 4 clusters: Strategic Defense Research, Defense Resource, Defense Science and Technology, and Equipment Development.

Some of publicly known Batekhan research activities are:

- Strategic Defense Research
  - Social studies in defense and military.
  - National security and defense threats analysis.
  - Studies in politics, social, economy, and cultures, and their relation to national defense and security.
  - Area studies related to national defense and security.
  - Studies in border politics, trans-national crimes, and border crimes.
  - Strategic studies in border affairs and outer islands.
  - Strategic studies in air defense.
  - Studies in conflict resolutions and peace.
  - Studies in strategic military maritime affairs.
  - Studies in civil defense.
  - Studies in climate change and its effects in warfare and national defense.
  - Studies in data security, cyber security, and cyber defense.
  - Studies in IED and delayed detonator for military purposes.
  - Strategic remote sensing and unmanned aerial vehicles application for military purposes.
- Defense Resource
  - National Defense Awareness Fostering Program.
  - Human resources studies to support national defense.
  - Strategic valuable mineral exploration and mining technology to support defense industries.
  - Thorium-based nuclear reactor for future nuclear-fueled naval ships.
  - Survey for strategic installations and rocket launching system.
  - Propellant research and development.
  - Energy studies for military purposes.
  - Food studies for military purposes.
  - Studies in military bureaucracy reform.
  - Disease surveillance for military purposes.
  - Bioterrorism research and natural biological resources exploration for national defense purposes.
  - Simulated warfare application development.
  - Military women's studies.
- Defense Science and Technology
  - Development of mission control system for unmanned surface vehicles.
  - Automation of heavy artilleries.
  - Rocket development.
  - Thorium-based nuclear reactor for defense purposes.
  - Sentry gun development.
  - Military satellite development.
  - Military communication system development.
  - Military software development.
  - Small jet engine development.
  - Smart bomb, and its guidance control system and seeker development.
  - IF-X development.
  - Warhead technology development.
  - Impact fuze rocket technology development.
  - Anti-radar ship coating technology development.
  - Night-vision device technology development.
  - Body armor technology development.
  - UAV technology development.
  - Military dynamic programming development.
  - Gauss cannon technology development.
  - Military ergonomics studies.
  - GPS research.
  - Tank technology development.
  - Unmanned submarine technology development.
- Equipment Development
  - Development of missile vehicles and launch vehicles.
  - Ground-to-ground 100 km-range rocket launcher.
  - Cruise missile development.
  - Man-portable air-defense system development.
  - Radar development.
  - Anti-tank weaponry development.
  - Mobile command control vehicle development.
  - Hyperbaric chamber development.
  - Mini submarine development.
  - Combat boat development for interception.
  - Amphibious vehicle development.
  - Armed patrol boat development.
  - Missiles development.
