= Ministry of Defense (Indonesia) =

Government ministry of Indonesia

- Kementerian Pertahanan
- Seal of the Ministry of Defense

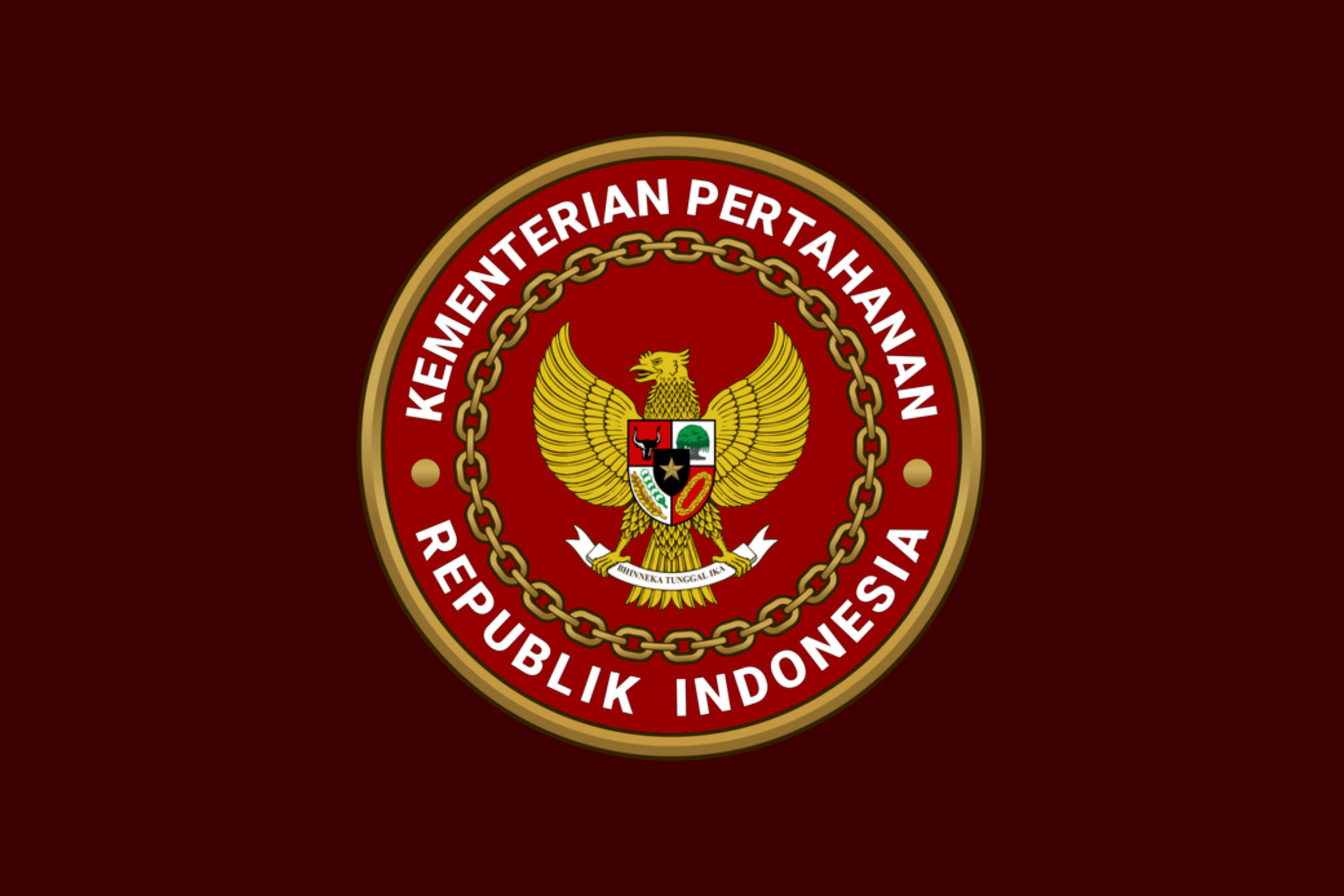
- Flag of the Ministry of Defense

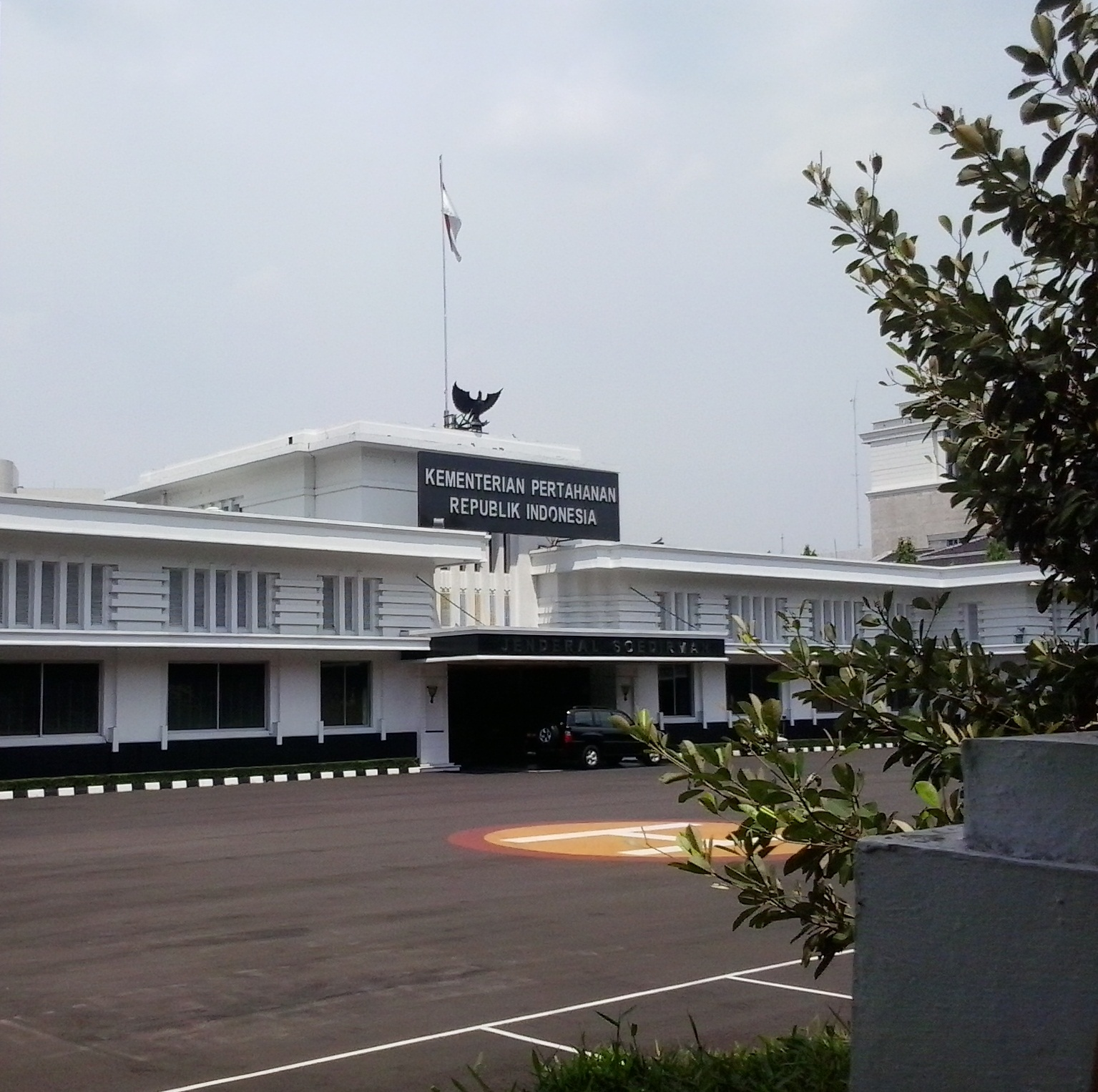
- Ministry of Defense headquarters

Ministry overview
- Formed: 18 August 1945; 81 years ago
- Jurisdiction: Government of Indonesia
- Headquarters: Jenderal Soedirman Building Central Jakarta, Jakarta, Indonesia
- Employees: 54,848 civilian employees 438,410 active duty military (2021 estimate)
- Annual budget: Rp 245.2 trillion rupiah (USD$15.1 billion, August 2025))
- Ministry executives: Sjafrie Sjamsoeddin, Minister of Defense; Donny Ermawan Taufanto, Deputy Minister of Defense
- Parent department: Coordinating Ministry for Political and Security Affairs
- Website: www.kemhan.go.id

The Ministry of Defense (Indonesian: Kementerian Pertahanan abbreviated Kemhan) is an Indonesian government ministry responsible for the defense of Indonesia. The ministry was formerly known as the Department of Defense (Departemen Pertahanan Republik Indonesia; Dephan) until 2009 when the nomenclature changed based on Act Number 39 of 2008 on State Ministries, the name of the Department of Defense was changed to the Ministry of Defense of the Republic of Indonesia. The currently-appointed minister is Sjafrie Sjamsoeddin, replacing Prabowo Subianto, who was elected President, on 21 October 2024.

The ministry is one of the three ministries (along with Ministry of Foreign Affairs and Ministry of Home Affairs) explicitly mentioned in the constitution of Indonesia, which means that it cannot be dissolved by the president.

If both the president and vice president were to die, resign, or are unable to perform their duties, the minister of defense, along with minister of foreign affairs and the minister of home affairs will jointly execute presidential duties until the succeeding president and vice President are elected by the People's Consultative Assembly within thirty days.

== History ==
=== Sukarno era ===
After the proclamation of Indonesian independence on 17 August 1945, the Preparatory Committee for Indonesian Independence (PPKI) immediately set up the first presidential cabinet which in the first cabinet didn't have a Minister of Defense. The function of the State Defense at that time was at the Minister of Public Security. On 6 October 1945, Supriyadi was declared Minister of Public Security. However, he never appeared, and was replaced on 20 October by interim minister Imam Muhammad Suliyoadikusumo.

During the time of the First Sjahrir Cabinet, the function of the state defense was also under the authority of the Minister of Public Security, held by Mr. Amir Sjarifuddin. However, in the Second Sjahrir Cabinet, the People's Security Minister was renamed as the Minister of Defense which was still held by Amir Sjarifuddin. At the time of Mr. Amir Sjarifuddin became prime minister, the defense minister is also held by the prime minister. In the period of the First Hatta Cabinet, when the Unitary State of the Republic of Indonesia was in an emergency state due to the pressure of the Dutch forces, the Vice President Mohammad Hatta served as interim minister of defense.

=== Suharto era ===
In the First Development Cabinet, the Minister of Defense and Security was held by the Indonesian President Gen. Suharto. Only later on the Second Development Cabinet and subsequently, the function of state defense was always united with the security function and was under the Ministry of Defense and Security where the Minister of Defense and Security would if needed serve concurrently as Commander of the Armed Forces (Panglima ABRI) (this was the case four times during Suharto's presidency). In 1985, as part of a wide reorganization of the armed forces, military appointments to the posts of ministers and below began to phased out, allowing retired officers and civilians to serve in the ministry, and operational control over the Armed Forces was passed directly to the office of the President.

=== Reformation ===
On 1 July 2000, the Ministry of Defense reformed itself with the separation of the TNI and the Polri and also a separation of positions, in which the Minister of Defense can be of a civilian background and can no longer concurrently serve as the TNI Commander (Panglima). Defense is regulated through Law no. 3 of 2002 on State Defense and Law no. 34 of 2004 on the Indonesian National Armed Forces. Law no. 3 of 2002 on State Defense Article 16 further stipulates the responsibilities of the Minister of Defense, as follows:

1. Minister leads the Ministry of Defense.
2. The Minister assists the President in formulating the general policy of state defense.
3. The Minister shall stipulate a policy on the implementation of state defense based on the general policy set by the President.
4. The Minister compiles the defense white paper and establishes bilateral, regional and international cooperation policies in its field.
5. The Minister formulates a general policy of using the power of the Indonesian National Armed Forces (TNI) and other defense components.
6. The Minister shall determine the policy of budgeting, procurement, recruitment, management of national resources, as well as the development of technology and defense industries required by the Indonesian Armed Forces and other defense force components.
7. The minister works with the heads of ministries and other government agencies and develops and implements strategic planning for the management of national resources for defense purposes.

Pursuant to Article 18 Paragraph 4, the Commander of the National Armed Forces shall be responsible to the President in the use of the state defense component and cooperate with the Minister in meeting the needs of the Indonesian National Armed Forces.

=== Naming history ===
Previous nomenclatures and their time period were:

1. Department of People's Security (Departemen Keamanan Rakyat) (1945–1946)
2. Department of Defense (Departemen Pertahanan) (1946–1962, 1999–2009)
3. Department of Defense and Security (Departemen Pertahanan dan Keamanan) (1962–1999)

== Task and Duties ==
The Ministry of Defense has the task of carrying out government affairs in the defense sector to assist the President in administering the country's government. In carrying out its duties, the Ministry of Defense performs the functions of:

1. Formulation, determination and implementation of policies in the fields of defense strategy, defense planning, defense potential and defense strength;
2. Coordinating the implementation of tasks, coaching and providing administrative support to all organizational elements within the Ministry of Defense;
3. Management of state property/wealth which is the responsibility of the Ministry of Defense;
4. Supervision over the implementation of tasks within the Ministry of Defense;
5. Implementation of defense facilities management;
6. Implementation of research and development in the defense sector;
7. Implementation of education and training in the defense sector;
8. Iimplementation of management of strategic defense installations;
9. Implementation of technical activities from the center to the regions; And
10. Implementation of substantive support to all organizational elements within the Ministry of Defense.

== Organization ==
The Minister of Defense, by Presidential Decree No. 85/2025, is the head of the Ministry of Defense, the principal assistant to the president in all matters concerning national defense, and has authority and control over the Ministry of Defense. Because the Constitution vests all military authority in the People's Representative Council and the president, the statutory authority in the Minister of Defense is derived from their constitutional authorities. Since it is impractical for the People's Representative Council and the president to participate in every piece of matters relating to national defense, the Minister of Defense, and the Minister's subordinate officials generally exercise national defense authority.

The organizational structure of the Ministry of Defense of the Republic of Indonesia according to Defense Ministerial Regulation No. 30/2025 and 13/2026 is as follows:

=== Leadership elements ===
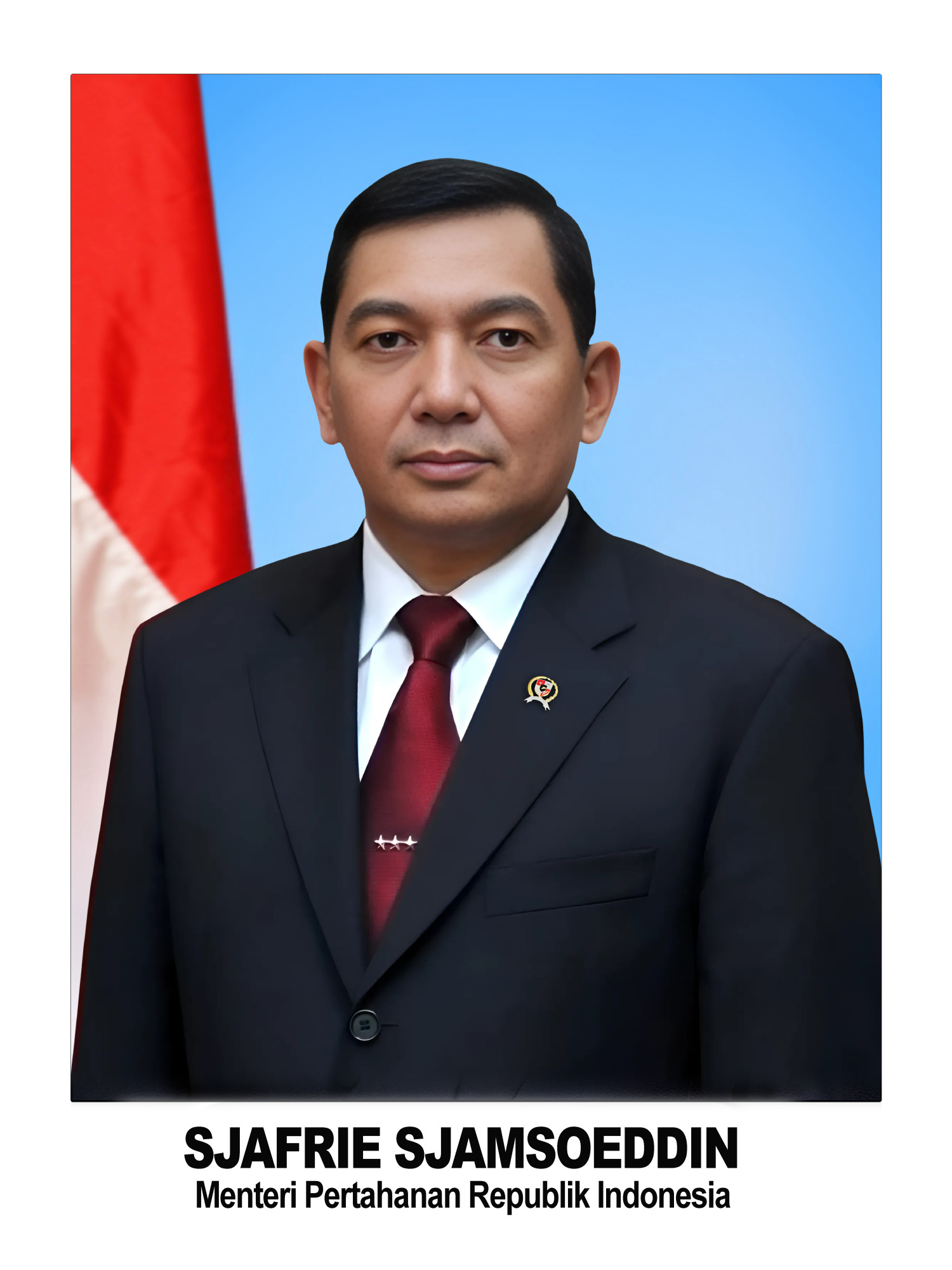
- The current minister of defense Lt. Gen. (Ret.) Sjafrie Sjamsoeddin
  Minister of Defense (Menteri Pertahanan); and
- Deputy Minister of Defense (Wakil Menteri Pertahanan)

=== Secretariat ===
- Secretariat General of Defense (Sekretariat Jenderal), headed by a Secretary General, tasked with coordinating duties, organizational management, and providing administrative support for the entire Ministry. The Secretariat General is organized into the following bureaus:
  - Office of the Secretary General of Defense
  - Bureau of Planning and Finance
  - Bureau of Human Resources
  - Bureau of Legal Affairs
  - Bureau of Administrative Affairs and Protocols
  - Bureau of General Affairs
  - Bureau of Defense Information
  - Bureau of Organization and Organizational Governance
  - Bureau of Defense Legislation

=== Inspectorate ===
- Inspectorate General of Defense (Inspektorat Jenderal), headed by an Inspector General, tasked with internal monitoring within the Ministry. The Inspectorate General headed several subsections, as follows:
  - Office of the Inspector General of Defense;
  - Secretariat of the Inspectorate-General;
  - Inspectorate I, overseeing Defense Planning, Defense Power, Defense Facilities, Education and Training, Strategic Defense Installations, Defense Worthiness, and western representative offices of the Ministry;
  - Inspectorate II, overseeing the Secretariat General, Defense Strategy, Defense Potential, Research and Development, Data and Information, Defense Finance, the Defense University, and eastern representative offices of the Ministry;
  - Inspectorate III, overseeing the finances of the Armed Forces General Headquarters and the Air Force;
  - Inspectorate IV, overseeing the finances of the Army; and
  - Inspectorate V, overseeing the finances of the Navy, the Defense Welfare, Education, and Housing Foundation (Yayasan Kesejahteraan Pendidikan dan Perumahan), and the Armed Forces insurance corporation.

=== Directorates-General ===
- Directorate General I (Defense Strategy) (Direktorat Jenderal Strategi Pertahanan), headed by a Director General, tasked with formulating and implementing Indonesian defense policy in the form of defense strategy of the state. The DG headed several subsections, as follows:
  - Secretariat of the Directorate General
    - Division of Program and Reporting
    - Division of Information, Archive and Administration
    - Division of General Affairs
    - Division of Management and Administration for State Defense Analyst Functionaries
  - Directorate of Strategic Defense Policies
    - Sub-directorate of Formulation of Basic Policies for State Defense
    - Sub-directorate of Formulation of Development Policies for State Defense
    - Sub-directorate of Evaluation of Strategic Defense Policies
    - Sub-directorate of Formulation of Policy Implementation of State Defense Policies
  - Directorate of Defense Components Mobilization
    - Sub-directorate of Military Defense Defense Mobilization
    - Sub-directorate of Non-military Defense Mobilization
    - Sub-directorate of Peacekeeping Missions
    - Sub-directorate of Strategic Analysis
  - Directorate of Defense International Cooperation
    - Sub-directorate of Asia Affairs
    - Sub-directorate of Americas and Pacific Affairs
    - Sub-directorate of Europe and Africa Affairs
    - Sub-directorate of Multilateral Co-operation
    - Sub-directorate of Military Attache and Permits
  - Directorate of Regional Defense
    - Sub-directorate of Defense Spatial Management
    - Sub-directorate of Land
    - Sub-directorate of Sea
    - Sub-directorate of Air
    - Sub-directorate of Survey and Mapping
- Directorate General II (Defense Planning) (Direktorat Jenderal Perencanaan Pertahanan), headed by a Director General, tasked with formulating and implementing Indonesian defense policy in the form of development planning and financial management of state defense. The DG headed several subsections, as follows:
  - Secretariat of the Directorate General
    - Division of Program and Reporting
    - Division of Information, Archive and Administration
    - Division of General Affairs
  - Directorate of Defense Development Planning
    - Sub-directorate of Formulation of Defense Development Planning
    - Sub-directorate of System and Methods
    - Sub-directorate of Analysis and Evaluation of Defense Development Planning
    - Sub-directorate of Planning for Defense Research and Development
  - Directorate of Defense Program and Budget Planning
    - Sub-directorate of Ministry of Defense and Indonesian National Armed Forces General Headquarters Program and Budget Planning
    - Sub-directorate of the Army, Navy, and Air Force Program and Budget Planning
    - Sub-directorate of Planning for Program and Budget of Operational Supports, Defense Industries, Project Assistance, and Loans
    - Sub-directorate of Analysis and Evaluation of Defense Program and Budget Planning
  - Directorate of Budget Implementation Administration
    - Sub-directorate of Budget Implementation Administration for Employees Spending and Goods Purchasing
    - Sub-directorate of Budget Implementation Administration for Capital Spending
    - Sub-directorate of Budget Implementation Administration of Foreign Loans, Domestic Loans, and Foreign Exchange
    - Sub-directorate of Evaluation of Program and Budget Implementation Reports
  - Directorate of Program and Budget Control
    - Sub-directorate of Program and Budget Control
    - Sub-directorate of Program and Budget Control System
    - Sub-directorate of Non-Tax State Revenue
    - Sub-directorate of Analysis and Evaluation of Budget Implementation Administration
- Directorate General III (Defense Potential) (Direktorat Jenderal Potensi Pertahanan), headed by a Director General, tasked with formulating and implementing Indonesian defense policy in the form of defense potentials. The DG headed several subsections, as follows:
  - Secretariat of the Directorate General
    - Division of Program and Reporting
    - Division of Information, Archive and Administration
    - Division of General Affairs
  - Directorate of Defense Technology
    - Sub-directorate of Management and Security of Technologies with Defense Potentials
    - Sub-directorate of Trade Returns, Local Contents, and Offsets
  - Directorate of Defense Industry
    - Sub-directorate of Licensing
    - Sub-directorate of Defense Industry Development
    - Sub-directorate of Defense Promotion and Defense Industries Cooperation
  - Directorate of Defense Potentials in Human Resources
    - Sub-directorate of Policies Formulation for National Defense and Fostering of Experts
    - Sub-directorate of Policies Formulation for National Reserve and Fostering of Militia
    - Sub-directorate of Policies Formulation for Veteran Affairs and Fostering of Public Miscellanea
  - Directorate of Defense Potentials in Natural and Artificial Resources
    - Sub-directorate of Strategic Materiel Reserves and Regional Logistics
    - Sub-directorate of Army, Health, and Storage Facilities and Infrastructures
    - Sub-directorate of Naval and Air Force Facilities and Infrastructures
- Directorate General IV (Defense Power) (Direktorat Jenderal Kekuatan Pertahanan), headed by a Director General, tasked with formulating and implementing Indonesian defense policy in the form of defense power. The DG headed several subsections, as follows:
  - Secretariat of the Directorate General
    - Division of Program and Reporting
    - Division of Information, Archive and Administration
    - Division of General Affairs
  - Directorate of Human Resources
    - Sub-directorate of Manpower Planning and Career System
    - Sub-directorate of Development and Education
    - Sub-directorate of Personnel Maintenance
    - Sub-directorate of Separation and Distribution
  - Directorate of Materials
    - Sub-directorate of Material Utilization Planning
    - Sub-directorate of Systems and Methods
    - Sub-directorate of Material Management
    - Sub-directorate of Firearms, Ammunitions, and Explosives Licensing
  - Directorate of Facilities and Services
    - Sub-directorate of Bases and Training Areas Facilities
    - Sub-directorate of Electrical, Gas, and Water Services and Infrastructures
    - Sub-directorate of Fuels and Lubricants Services and Infrastructures
    - Sub-directorate of Information and Communication System and Electronics
    - Sub-directorate of Land and Buildings
  - Directorate of Health
    - Sub-directorate of Health Power
    - Sub-directorate of Health Manpower
    - Sub-directorate of Health Materials and Facilities
    - Sub-directorate of Health Supports

=== Agencies ===
- Defense Logistics Agency (Badan Logistik Pertahanan), headed by a chief, tasked with the management of defense logistics.
  - Secretariat
    - Division of Programs and Reporting
    - Division of Information, Archives, and Administration
    - Division of General Affairs
    - Division of Retrieval and Transfer
  - Center for Funding
    - Division of Domestic and Foreign Loans Funding
    - Division of Full Rupiahs and State Sharia Bonds and Securities
  - Center for Defense Equipment
    - Division of Army Equipment
    - Division of Naval Equipment
    - Division of Air Force Equipment
  - Center for Construction
    - Division of Construction Planning
    - Division of Construction Procurement
    - Division of Construction Supervision, Monitoring, and Evaluation
  - Center for Codification
    - Division of Codex Administration, Development, and System Information
    - Division of Codex Operation
    - Division of Codex Technical Support
  - Center for State Properties
    - Division of State Properties Management I
    - Division of State Properties Management II
    - Division of State Properties Management III
- Defense Facilities Maintenance and Sustainment Agency (Badan Pemeliharaan dan Perawatan Pertahanan), headed by a chief, tasked with the (1) management and maintenance of defense equipment and facilities and (2) research, development, and management of defense pharmaceuticals, biological products, and vaccine production. The agency consisted of:
  - Secretariat
    - Division of Programs and Reporting
    - Division of Information, Archives, and Administration
    - Division of General Affairs
  - Center for Defense Equipment Maintenance and Care Planning
    - Division of Planning and Maintenance of Army Defense Equipment
    - Division of Planning and Maintenance of Naval Defense Equipment
    - Division of Planning and Maintenance of Air Force Defense Equipment
  - Center for Defense Infrastructures Maintenance and Care Planning
    - Division of Planning and Maintenance of Army Defense Infrastructure
    - Division of Planning and Maintenance of Naval Defense Infrastructure
    - Division of Planning and Maintenance of Air Force Defense Infrastructure
  - Center for Defense Pharmacy Management
    - Division of Production, Distribution, and Development
    - Division of Partnership, Planning, and Quality Assurance
    - Army Pharmacy Institute
    - Navy Pharmacy Institute
    - Air Force Pharmacy Institute
    - Army Biological and Vaccine Institute
- National Reserve Agency (Badan Cadangan Nasional), headed by a chief, tasked with the management of the Indonesian National Armed Forces Reserve Component program. The agency consisted of:
  - Secretariat
    - Division of Programs and Reporting
    - Division of Information, Archives, and Administration
    - Division of General Affairs
  - Center for Reserve Command
    - Division of Planning of National Reserve Procurement and Formation
    - Division of Fostering of National Reserve
  - Center for National Defense
    - Division of Education
    - Division of Work
    - Division of Public
  - Center for Veteran Affairs
    - Division of Veteran Administration
    - Division of Welfare
    - Division of Partnership and Social Communication
- Defense Technology Agency (Badan Teknologi Pertahanan), headed by a chief, tasked with research and development in defense warfare technologies. The agency consisted of:
  - Secretariat
    - Division of Programs and Reporting
    - Division of Information, Archives, and Administration
    - Division of General Affairs
    - Division of Technological Partnership
  - Center for Land Warfare Technology
    - Division of Vehicle Research
    - Division of Armament Research
    - Division of Logistic, Electronics, and Communication Research
  - Center for Naval Warfare Technology
    - Division of Ship Research
    - Division of Electronic Armament Research
    - Division of Naval Logistics Research
  - Center for Air Warfare Technology
    - Division of Airplane Research
    - Division of Air Weaponry System Research
    - Division of Logistics and Electronics Research
- Defense Human Resource Development Agency (Badan Pengembangan Sumber Daya Manusia Pertahanan), headed by a chief, tasked with implementing defense education and training. The agency consisted of:
  - Secretariat
    - Division of Programs and Reporting
    - Division of Competency Development Standard
    - Division of Data, Information, and Partnership
    - Division of General Affairs
  - Center for Defense Leadership and Management Education and Training
    - Division of Competency Development Planning
    - Division of Competency Development Operation
    - Division of Competency Development Evaluation and Quality Improvement
  - Center for Defense Language
    - Division of Competency Development Planning
    - Division of Competency Development Operation
    - Division of Competency Development Evaluation and Quality Improvement
  - Center for National Defense Education
    - Division of Competency Development Planning
    - Division of Competency Development Operation
    - Division of Competency Development Evaluation and Quality Improvement
  - Center for Defense Human Resources Competency Management
    - Division of Talent Acquisition and Valuation
    - Division of Talent Mapping and Retention
    - Division of Talent Succession Planning and Evaluation
- Defense Information, Communication, and Intelligence Agency (Badan Informasi dan Komunikasi Intelijen Pertahanan), headed by a chief, tasked with performing military cyber defense, performing defense intelligence, collection of naval, army, and air force technological designs and specifications, and domestic and foreign military intelligence communication. The agency consisted of:
  - Secretariat
    - Division of Programs and Reporting
    - Division of Information, Archives, and Administration
    - Division of General Affairs
  - Center of Defense Intelligence Analysis
    - Division of Domestic Affairs
    - Division of Asia-Pacific Affairs
    - Division of America, Europe, and Africa Affairs
  - Center of Cyber Defense and Defense Intelligence Technology
    - Division of Defense Cybersecurity
    - Division of Defense Cyberoperations
    - Division of Defense Technological Intelligence
  - Center of Defense Intelligence Communication and Support
    - Division of Strategy and System
    - Division of Intelligence and Cyberintelligence Partnership
    - Division of Technical Intelligence Communication

=== Advisors ===
- Advisor to the Minister on Defense and Political Affairs (Staf Ahli bidang Politik), advises the Minister on matter of political affairs
- Advisor to the Minister on Economic Affairs and Defense Industry (Staf Ahli bidang Ekonomi), advises the Minister on matter of economic affairs
- Advisor to the Minister on Social Affairs (Staf Ahli bidang Sosial), advises the Minister on matter of social affairs
- Advisor to the Minister on Security Affairs (Staf Ahli bidang Keamanan), advises the Minister on matter of security affairs

=== Centers ===
- Defense Worthiness Center (Pusat Kelaikan), headed by a chief, tasked with providing support for the Ministry and other related agencies on design certification, product worthiness, and quality control and assurances. The Center headed several subsections, as follows:
  - Administration Division
  - Indonesian Military Landworthiness Authority
  - Indonesian Military Seaworthiness Authority
  - Indonesian Military Airworthiness Authority
- Center for Data and Information (Pusat Data dan Informasi), headed by a chief, tasked with providing support for the Ministry and other related agencies on data and information and management of IT infrastructures, as well research and development of Ministry of Defense cipher, information systems, and applications.
  - Administration Division
  - Division of Defense Information System Development and Management
  - Division of IT and Communication Infrastructures
  - Division of Information System Security and Cipher
- Defense Health Center (Pusat Kesehatan Pertahanan), headed by a chief, tasked with providing support for the Ministry and other related agencies on medical rehabilitation, vocational rehabilitation, social rehabilitation, and hospitalization of veterans and wounded personnel of the Armed Forces. It also managed the Ministry of Defense Hospitals. The Center headed several subsections, as follows:
  - Administration Division
  - Social and Vocational Rehabilitation Division
  - Medical and Psychological Rehabilitation Division
  - Health Partnership and Contingence Division
  - Dr. Suyoto Medical Rehabilitation Hospital
  - Soedirman National Defense Central Hospital
- Defense Regional Management Center (Pusat Pengelolaan Kawasan), headed by a chief, tasked with providing support for the Ministry and other related agencies management of Indonesian Peace and Security Center campuses. The Center headed several subsections, as follows:
  - Administration Division
  - Security Division
  - Building Management Division
  - Partnership and Installation Development Division
- Defense Financial Monitoring and Management Center (Pusat Pelaporan dan Pembinaan Keuangan Pertahanan), headed by a chief, tasked with providing support for the Ministry and other related agencies on financial management and administration. The Center headed several subsections, as follows:
  - Administration Division
  - Accounting and Financial Reporting Division
  - Treasury Administration Division
  - Financial Verification and Control Division
  - Chief Analysts of the Defense Financial Monitoring and Management Center

== Seal ==
Seal of the Ministry of Defense (c. 2005–20 January 2022)

Flag of the Ministry of Defense (????–20 January 2022)

Seal of the Ministry of Defense (from 20 January 2022)

== See also ==
- Government of Indonesia
- Indonesian National Armed Forces (TNI)
