= 2023 in Indonesia =

- Centuries: 20th; 21st
- Decades: 2000s; 2010s; 2020s
- See also: History of Indonesia; Timeline of Indonesian history; List of years in Indonesia

2023 (MMXXIII) was a common year starting on Sunday of the Gregorian calendar, the 2023rd year of the Common Era (CE) and Anno Domini (AD) designations, the 23rd year of the 3rd millennium and the 21st century, and the 4th year of the 2020s decade.

The year was mostly marked by political events in the country as the nation was preparing for the 2024 general election in which a new leader would be chosen as the 8th President of Indonesia. Former Indonesian General and incumbent Minister of Defence Prabowo Subianto, Former Governor of Jakarta Anies Baswedan and incumbent governor of Central Java Ganjar Pranowo were the candidates for the Indonesian presidential race. However, several controversies were reported regarding some aspects of the election and its preparation. The Palestinian - Israeli conflict had also significantly affected the nation. In March, Indonesia lost its host status for the 2023 FIFA U-20 World Cup due to its opposition to Israel's participation. Subsequently, the country also actively voiced its concerns following the outbreak of the Gaza war.

The year also marked the end of the COVID-19 pandemic in Indonesia as the disease had entered its endemic stage. The mask mandate was lifted and mask was not required to be worn in public anymore.

== Incumbents ==
=== President and Vice President ===
President	Vice President
Joko Widodo	Ma'ruf Amin

=== Ministers and Coordinating Ministers ===
==== Coordinating Ministers ====
Photo	Position	Name
	Coordinating Minister of Political, Legal, and Security Affairs	Mahfud MD
	Coordinating Minister of Economic Affairs	Airlangga Hartarto
	Coordinating Minister of Maritime Affairs and Investment	Luhut Binsar Pandjaitan
	Coordinating Minister of Human Development and Culture	Muhadjir Effendy

==== Ministers ====
Photo	Position	Name
	Minister of State Secretariat	Pratikno
	Minister of Home Affairs	Tito Karnavian
	Minister of Foreign Affairs	Retno Marsudi
	Minister of Defence	Prabowo Subianto
	Minister of Law and Human Rights	Yasonna Laoly
	Minister of Finance	Sri Mulyani
	Minister of Energy and Mineral Resources	Arifin Tasrif
	Minister of Industry	Agus Gumiwang Kartasasmita
	Minister of Trade	Zulkifli Hasan
	Minister of Agriculture	Syahrul Yasin Limpo
	Minister of Environment and Forestry	Siti Nurbaya Bakar
	Minister of Transportation	Budi Karya Sumadi
	Minister of Marine Affairs and Fisheries	Sakti Wahyu Trenggono
	Minister of Manpower	Ida Fauziyah
	Minister of Public Works and Public Housing	Basuki Hadimuljono
	Minister of Health	Budi Gunadi Sadikin
	Minister of Education, Culture, Research and Technology	Nadiem Makarim
	Minister of Agrarian Affairs and Spatial Planning	Hadi Tjahjanto
	Minister of Social Affairs	Tri Rismaharini
	Minister of Religious Affairs	Yaqut Cholil Qoumas
	Minister of Communication and Information Technology	Budi Arie Setiadi
	Minister of Research and Technology	Bambang Brodjonegoro
	Minister of Cooperatives and Small & Medium Enterprises	Teten Masduki
	Minister of Women's Empowerment and Child Protection	I Gusti Ayu Bintang Darmawati
	Minister of Administrative and Bureaucratic Reform	Abdullah Azwar Anas
	Minister of Villages, Development of Disadvantaged Regions and Transmigration	Abdul Halim Iskandar
	Minister of National Development Planning	Suharso Monoarfa
	Minister of State-Owned Enterprises	Erick Thohir
	Minister of Tourism and Creative Economy	Sandiaga Uno
	Minister of Youth and Sports	Dito Ariotedjo
	Minister of Investment	Bahlil Lahadalia

== Events ==
=== January ===
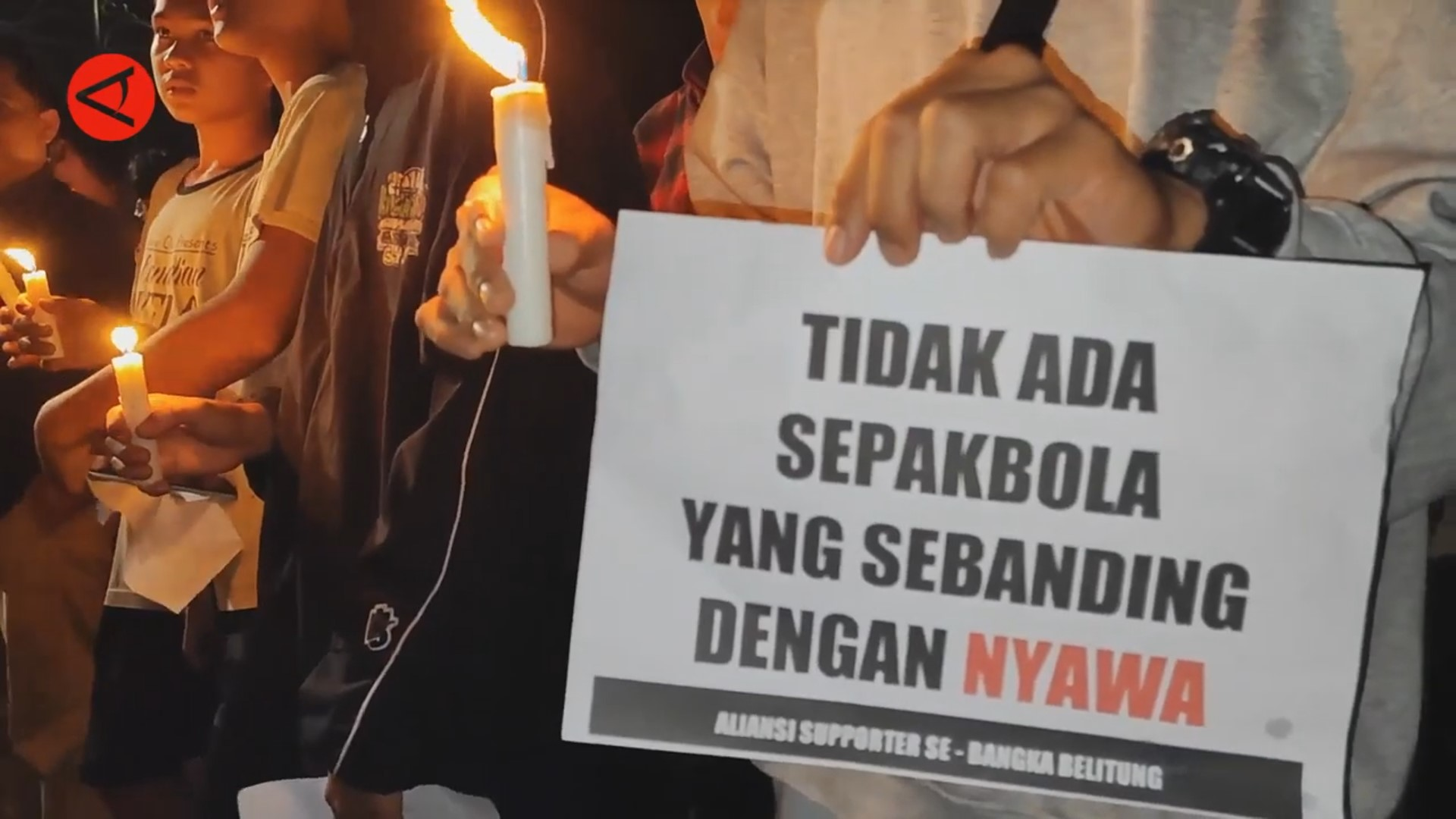
First public hearing for the victims of the 2022 Kanjuruhan disaster is held in East Java

- 7–12 January – Papuan separatist rebels launches multiple attacks in Oksibil, sparking evacuations of civilians.
- 10 January
  - Papuan governor Lukas Enembe is arrested for alleged corruption case.
  - A magnitude 7.5 earthquake strikes Maluku, damaging dozens of buildings.
- 11 January – Government acknowledges 12 major human rights violations in the past.
- 16 January – Indonesian court holds the first public hearing for the 2022 Kanjuruhan disaster.
- 21 January – More than 100 are displaced after riots erupt in Dogiyai Regency, Highland Papua.
- 29 January – Protest following slow response of Kanjuruhan disaster turns violent in Malang, injuring 3.
- Starting from early January to February – A series of chain messages and rumours regarding child abduction became widespread.

=== February ===
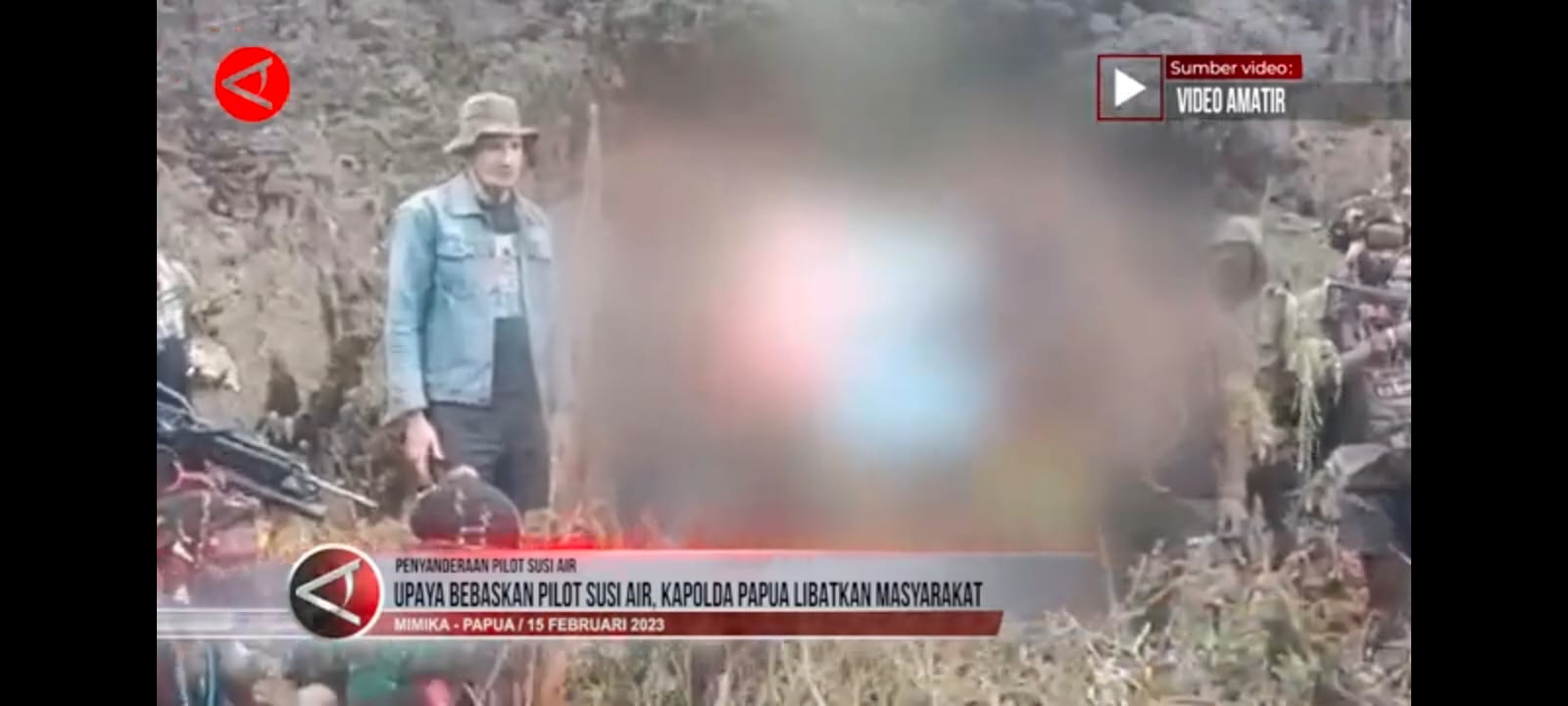
Image of the New Zealand pilot who was taken hostage by Papuan rebels

- 5 February – Motorcycle gang attacks and kills 1 citizen in Cimahi, then destroys a hotel.
- 7 February – Papuan rebels take a New Zealand national hostage in Nduga, demanding the official recognition of Papua's independence from Indonesia.
- 9 February – Four people are killed and several houses and buildings are destroyed by a 5.4 magnitude earthquake in Papua.
- 13 February – Murder of Nofriansyah Yosua Hutabarat: Ferdy Sambo is found guilty of killing his adjutant, Nofriansyah Yosua Hutabarat, and is sentenced to death.
- 20 February - At least 4 are killed after a house storing fireworks explodes in Blitar, East Java.
- 23 February – The Indonesian Prosperous Justice Party (PKS) officially endorses Anies Baswedan as a presidential candidate for the 2024 general elections.
- 25 February – At least 12 are killed during a riot in Wamena, Highland Papua.

=== March ===
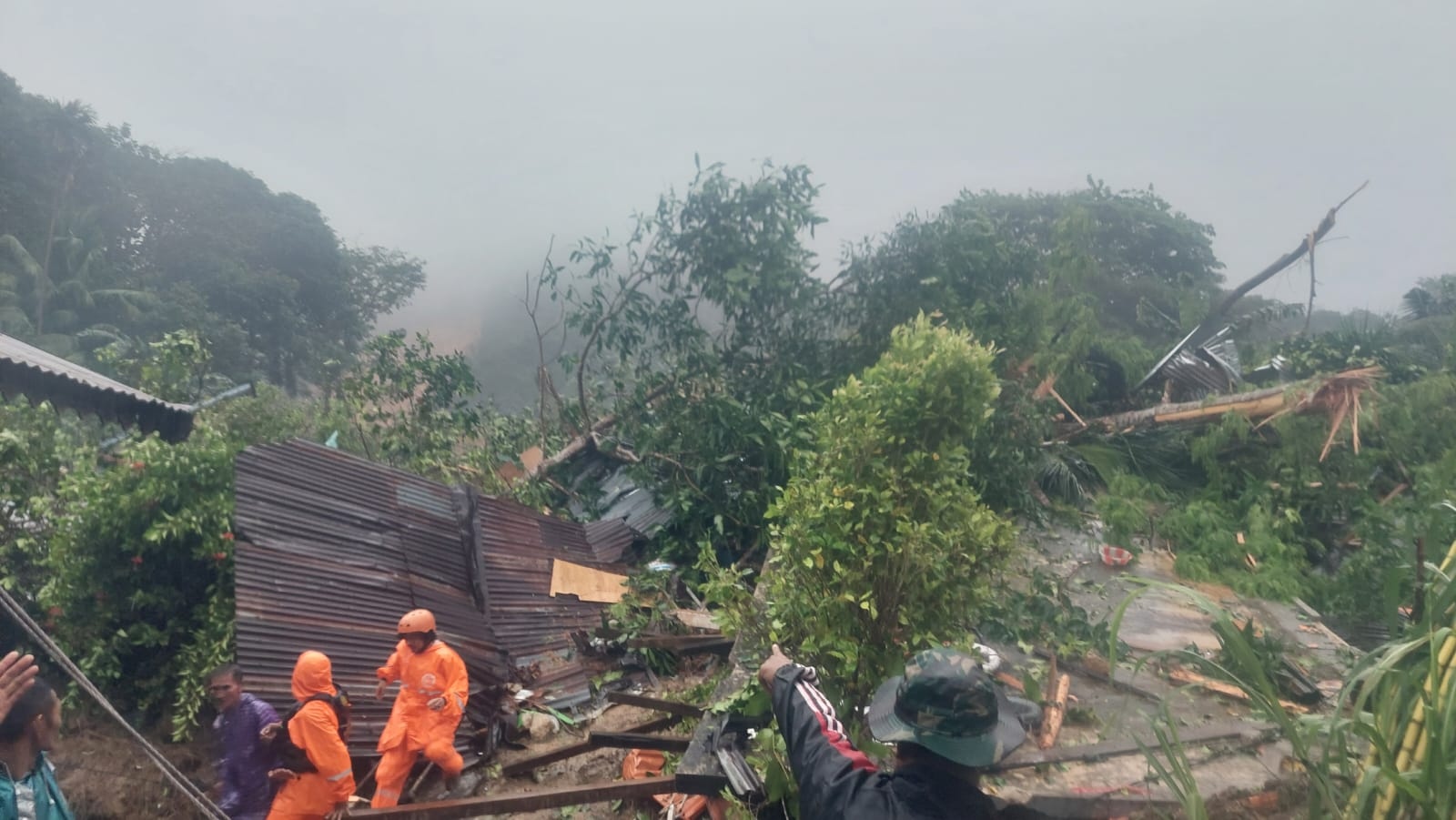
Entire village was wiped out following a massive landslide in Serasan, burying dozens of residents

- 2 March
  - Democratic Party officially endorses Anies Baswedan as a presidential nominee for the 2024 elections.
  - District court of Central Jakarta ordered postponement of 2024 elections.
- 3 March – 2023 Plumpang oil depot fire: Seventeen people are killed and fifty others are injured by a fire in a fuel storage station in Koja, Jakarta.
- 6 March – A series of landslide was triggered in Natuna Regency, resulting in 50 people missing.
- 11 March
  - Merapi erupts. Eight villages are affected by volcanic ash.
  - Jakarta High Court overturns Jakarta's Lower Court's order to postpone 2024 elections.
- 24 March – Jakarta's local government announces that the death toll from the oil depot fire in Plumpang has risen to 33.
- 28 March – Kapuas regent Ben Brahim S.Banat is arrested by the Corruption Eradication Commission (KPK).
- 29 March
  - Indonesia has been canceled from hosting the U-20 World Cup by FIFA, due to several parties rejecting the arrival of the U-20 Israel National Team to compete in Indonesia.
  - Indonesian House of Representatives summons incumbent coordinating minister Mahfud MD for questioning following accusations of alleged money laundering of more than 300 trillion rupiah within Indonesia's Ministry of Finance.

=== April ===
- 3 April – President Joko Widodo appoints Dito Ariotedjo as Minister of Youth and Sports and Rycko Amelza Dahniel as Head of the National Counter Terrorism Agency.
- 4 April – KPK has arrested Director General of Taxes, Rafael Alun Trisambodo, on charges of gratification.
- 11 April – Police names M. Iman Mahlil Lubis, a former employee of a state-owned bank, as suspect in a case of pasting fake QRIS codes on charity boxes at a number of mosques in Jakarta.
- 16 April
  - Papuan rebels announce the deaths of 9 Indonesian soldiers after claiming that the operation to rescue a New Zealand hostage from the Papuan jungles has been botched.
  - Indonesian military refuses the statement and only acknowledges one death from the ambush. The military admits that 5 people have been MIA.
- 17 April – Armed Forces admits that 5 soldiers have been killed during the botched rescue operation in Papua.
- 21 April – Indonesian Democratic Party of Struggle endorses incumbent Central Java Governor Ganjar Pranowo as presidential hopeful of the 2024 general elections.
- 22 April – People's Conscience Party endorses Ganjar Pranowo as presidential nominee of 2024 elections.
- 24 April – Government evacuates hundreds of Indonesian nationals from Sudan after conflict erupts throughout the country.
- 26 April – United Development Party officially endorses Ganjar Pranowo as presidential nominee of the 2024 elections.
- 27 April – SB Evelyn Calisca capsizes within the waters of Indragiri Hilir in Riau, killing 12 people.

=== May ===
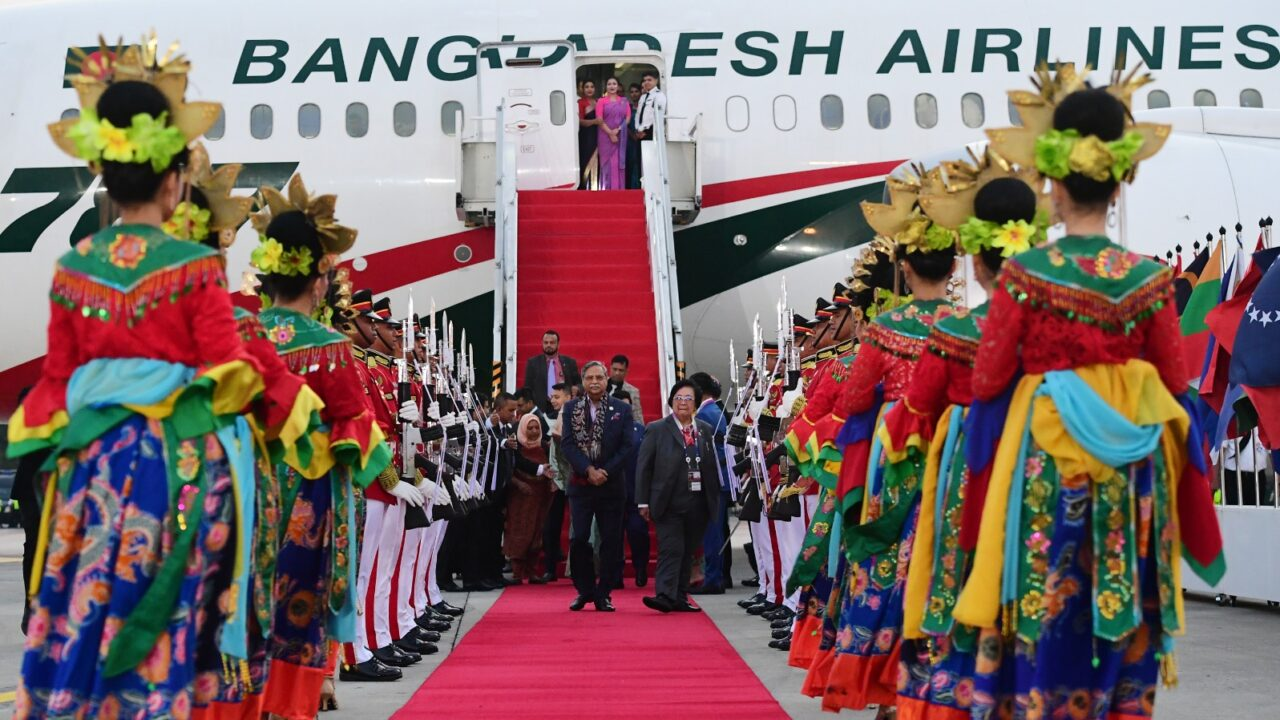
Arrival of Bangladeshi President Shahabuddin during the 2023 ASEAN Summit in Jakarta

- 1 May – BRIN researchers Andi Pangerang Hasanuddin, who wanted to threaten Muhammadiyah were arrested by Bareskrim officials, claiming they were tired of arguing over the difference in the determination of Eid al-Fitr.
- 2 May – A shooting occurred at the Central Indonesian Ulema Council (MUI) Office in Central Jakarta. The perpetrator died in the attack.
- 7 May – At least 3 people are killed and more than 30 are injured after a bus plunges into a river in Tegal.
- 10–11 May – First 2023 ASEAN Summit is held in Ballroom Komodo, Meruorah Convention Center, Labuan Bajo, East Nusa Tenggara.
- 12 May – Papuan rebels launch an attack on workers in Okbibab, four of whom are held as hostages.
- 14 May – President Joko Widodo keeps the names of the presidential and vice-presidential candidates for the 2024 Presidential Election as a result of the People's Consultation (Musra).
- 17 May
  - The Minister of Communication and Information Technology, Johnny G. Plate has officially become a suspect in the Rp. 8 trillion Base Transceiver Station (BTS) 4G.
  - With 276 medals, Indonesia finishes 3rd in the 2023 Southeast Asian Games.
- 20 May – President Joko Widodo appointed Mahfud MD as Acting Minister of Communication and Information Technology, temporarily.
- 28 May – An Indonesian Armed Forces helicopter crashes during a flight training in Bandung. All aboard survives the crash.
- 30 May – President Joko Widodo announced a new logo for new Capital city of Nusantara, with Aulia Akbar winning the competition with a Tree of Life (Pohon Hayat) theme.

=== June ===
- 3 June – KRI Teluk Hading (538) caught fire in the waters of the Selayar Islands.
- 7 June – BPOM has arrested the sale of illegal drugs through one of the online shops, Shopee. The evidence secured is estimated to have an economic value of Rp. 10 billion.
- 15 June
  - Indonesian Constitutional Court decides to continue the use of Open Proportional System for the 2024 general elections.
  - There has been a demonstration at the Al-Zaytun Islamic boarding school, Indramayu, West Java, and asked the Ministry of Religion to investigate heretical teachings in it.
- 19 June
  - The Ministry of Communication and Information Technology has launched the Republic of Indonesia Satellite (SATRIA-1), which is located from Cape Canaveral, Florida, United States using SpaceX's Falcon 9 rocket. The presence of this satellite will make it easier for Indonesians to access the internet and connect with one another.
  - The Indonesian national team lost against Argentina with a score of 0-2 at the GBK stadium.
- 21 June – President Joko Widodo announces that the COVID-19 pandemic in Indonesia has officially entered its endemic phase.
- 23 June
  - A SAM Air Cessna 208 carrying 6 people goes missing while flying over the Papuan jungles in Yalimo Regency.
  - FIFA officially appointed Indonesia as the new host of 2023 FIFA U-17 World Cup.
- 24 June – A tornado strikes more than a hundred homes in Batam, Riau Islands. At least 7 people are injured.
- 26 June – The Islamic Brotherhood Front held a demonstration to demand the disbandment of the Al-Zaytun Islamic Boarding School and demand that its leader, Panji Gumilang be arrested.
- 30 June – Moderate 5.8 magnitude earthquake strikes Yogyakarta, killing one and injuring more than 20. Hundreds of structures are reportedly damaged across the region.

=== July ===
- 1 July – Bank Indonesia has started imposing a QRIS Service Fee or Merchant Discount Rate (MDR) for merchants of 0.3%.
- 7 July – At least 7 are dead and 2 are critically injured following an elevator accident in Lampung.
- 8 July – Lumajang Regency declares emergency after a massive lahar flood from nearby Mount Semeru forces more than 500 residents to evacuate.
- 11 July – Despite criticisms from multiple medical professionals, Indonesian House of Representatives passes the landmark health bill into law.
- 17 July – President Joko Widodo carried out a cabinet reshuffle for several ministers and deputy ministers. Budi Arie, as Minister of Communication and Informatics who replaced Johnny G Plate. Then, Nezar Patria as Deputy Minister of Communication and Information Technology, Prof. Paiman Raharjo as Deputy Minister of Villages, Pahala Mansury as Deputy Minister of Foreign Affairs, Rosan Roeslani as Deputy Minister of BUMN, and Saiful R Dasuki as Deputy Minister of Religion.
- 18 July – The Coordinating Ministry for Political, Legal and Security Affairs Mahfud MD ensures that the Government does not disband the Al Zaytun Islamic Boarding School (Ponpes), Indramayu, West Java. The government will conduct coaching for the Santri's.
- 24 July – A boat carrying 48 people sinks within the waters of Central Buton Regency, killing 15 people.
- 31 July – Head of the National Search and Rescue Agency Marsdya TNI Henri Alfiandi is declared by KPK as a suspect in a purported bribery case.

=== August ===
- 5 August – President Joko Widodo has officially dissolved the Committee for Handling COVID-19 and National Economic Recovery (KPC-PEN) to end the handling of the COVID-19 pandemic in Indonesia.
- 8 August – Murder of Nofriansyah Yosua Hutabarat: The Indonesian Supreme Court decides to change the sentences of the accused perpetrators in the murder case of Nofriansyah Yosua Hutabarat, sparking shocks and criticisms from the public.
- 13 August – The Golkar, PAN, PKB parties forms a coalition with Gerindra Party to endorse Prabowo Subianto as a presidential candidate in the 2024 election.
- 17 August - A pedestrian suspension bridge in Sekadau Regency collapses during 17 August celebrations, injuring 32 people.

=== September ===
- 1 September – Five people are killed when an outdoor lift cable snaps and falls into a ravine at a resort in Ubud, Bali.
- 2 September – Anies Baswedan from the NasDem Party and National Awakening Party (PKB) General Chair Muhaimin Iskandar have been officially declared as of Presidential Candidates and Vice Presidential Candidates in the 2024 Election.
- 6 September – One of the largest fires occurs in Mount Bromo, East Java, following recklessly ignited flares.
- 11 September - More than 3,500 people evacuates in Central Sulawesi following a strong 6.3 earthquake that struck the region.
- 16 September – The National Museum in Jakarta caught on fire in the Gedung Gajah section of the museum, causing the roof and the back walls of the building to collapse.
- 21 September – Pohuwato regent office in Gorontalo is set alight by protesters who are demanding compensation for a gold mining. Previously, protesters have raided the office PT Puncak Tani Emas Sejahtera on the same day.
- 23 September - At least 3 are dead and more than a dozen are injured after a truck collides with multiple vehicles at a traffic intersection in Semarang.
- 25 September – TikTok Shop has been officially banned by the Ministry of Trade for trading in Indonesia.

=== October ===
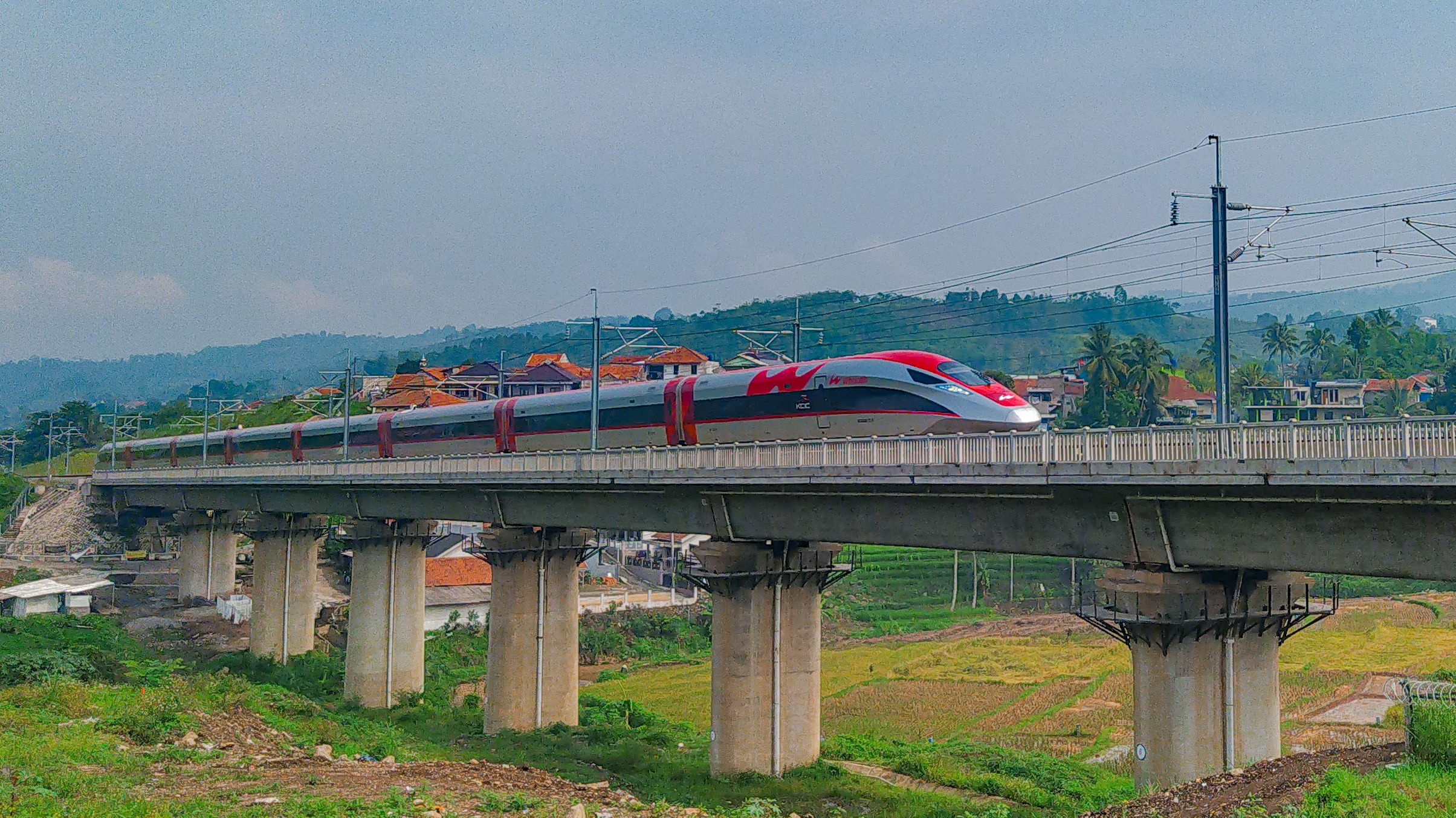
The first high-speed train in Southeast Asia is officially opened by President Joko Widodo

- 2 October - The Jakarta-Bandung Fast Train (KCJB) WHOOSH, the first high-speed train in Indonesia and Southeast Asia, is inaugurated by President Joko Widodo.
- 3 October - The Draft Law on State Civil Apparatus is passed by members of Indonesian House of Representatives and prohibits Government Agencies from recruiting Honorary Personnel.
- 13 October – The Corruption Eradication Commission names the Minister of Agriculture Syahrul Yasin Limpo as a suspect of a money laundering scheme within the Ministry of Agriculture.
- 16 October – The Constitutional Court of Indonesia rules that regional leaders under 40 may run for president or vice president, thus paving the path for President Joko Widodo's son, Gibran Rakabuming Raka, who is the mayor of Surakarta, to run as Vice President candidate in the next presidential election.
- 17 October – At least 31 are injured after a passenger train collides with a derailed train in Kulonprogo, Yogyakarta.
- 18 October – Mahfud MD has been officially selected as vice presidential candidate to accompany presidential candidate Ganjar Pranowo in the 2024 Presidential Elections.
- 21 October - A tornado strikes a residential area in Sukabumi Regency, affecting over 300 residents and damaging more than 70 structures.
- 22 October – Prabowo Subianto has officially announced Gibran Rakabuming as vice presidential candidate in the 2024 Presidential Elections.
- 24 October – Bali declares state of emergency over extreme drought and wildfires.
- 25 October – President Joko Widodo carries out a cabinet reshuffle with Arman Sulaiman as Minister of Agriculture, and also Lt. Gen. TNI Agus Subianto as Army Chief of Staff.

=== November ===
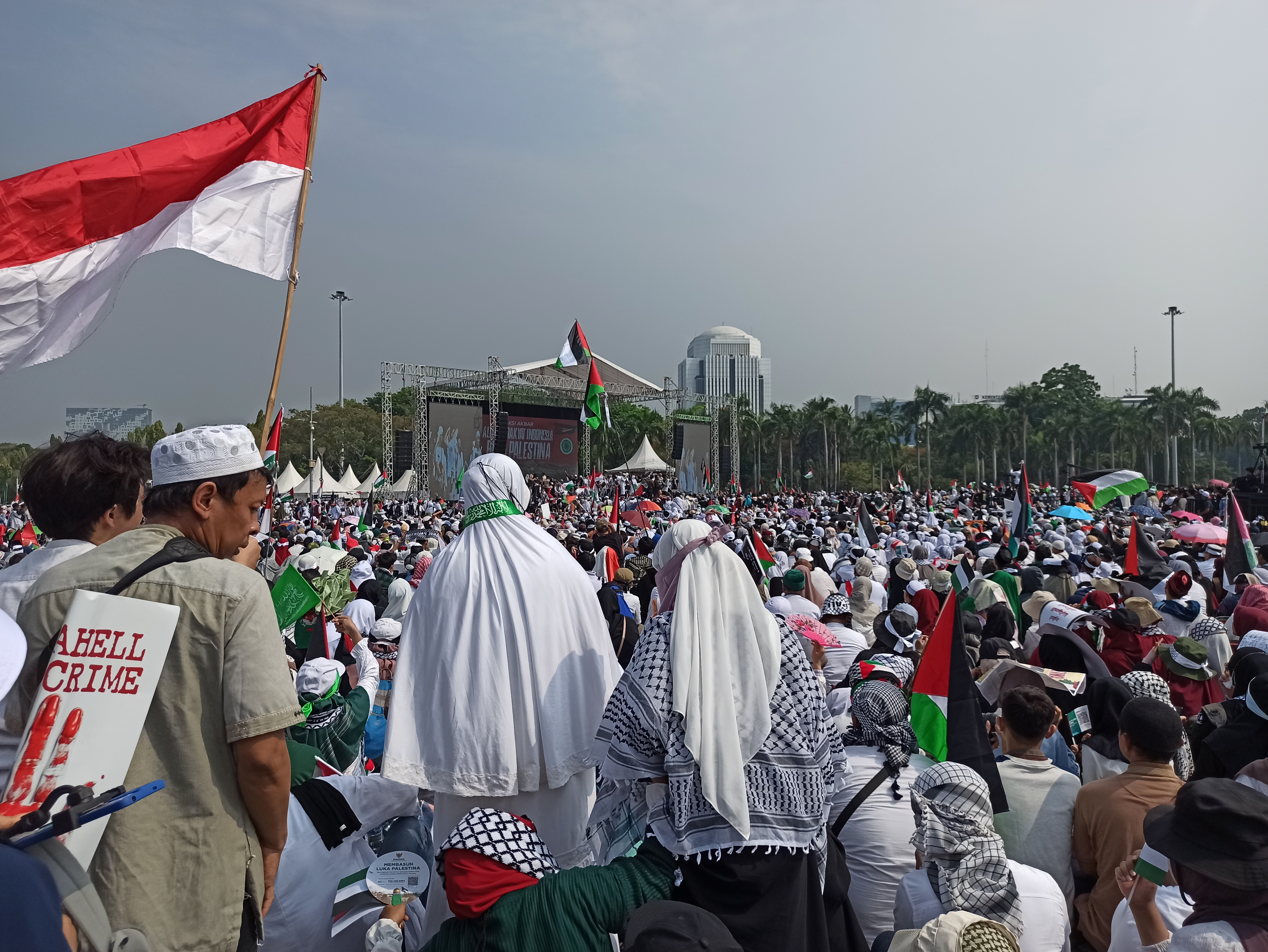
A massive rally to show solidarity with Palestine in Jakarta's National Monument (Monas).

- 5 November – Following the blockade of Gaza by Israeli forces in response to the October 7 attack, multiple organizations, with support from the Indonesian government, hold a massive rally at Monas, Central Jakarta to show solidarity with the Palestinian cause.
- 7 November – The Honorary Council of the Constitutional Court (MKMK) has decided to dismiss Anwar Usman as Chief Justice of the Constitutional Court for violating the Code of Ethics.
- 9 November – Suhartoyo is elected to become Chief Justice replacing Anwar Usman, who is also the brother-in-law of President Joko Widodo, after the Honor Council's decision to remove the latter from his position. This decision follows a controversial ruling regarding the age limit for presidential and vice-presidential candidates.
- 10 November – 2023 FIFA U-17 World Cup commences, with President Joko Widodo attending the opening ceremony.
- 12 November – Acting Sorong regent Yan Piet Mosso along with three officials of the Sorong Regency and two BPK examiners representative of Southwest Papua are arrested by the Corruption Eradication Commission.
- 20 November – Indonesian language has been designated as the 10th Official Language at the General Conference of the United Nations (UN) Educational, General Scientific and Cultural Organization by UNESCO.
- 23 November – Corruption Eradication Commission Chairman Firli Bahuri has been named a suspect in the alleged extortion case against former Minister of Agriculture Syahrul Yasin Limpo.
- 25 November – Pro-Palestinian and Pro-Israeli protesters violently clashes in Bitung City, North Sulawesi Province, killing one person and injuring two others.

=== December ===
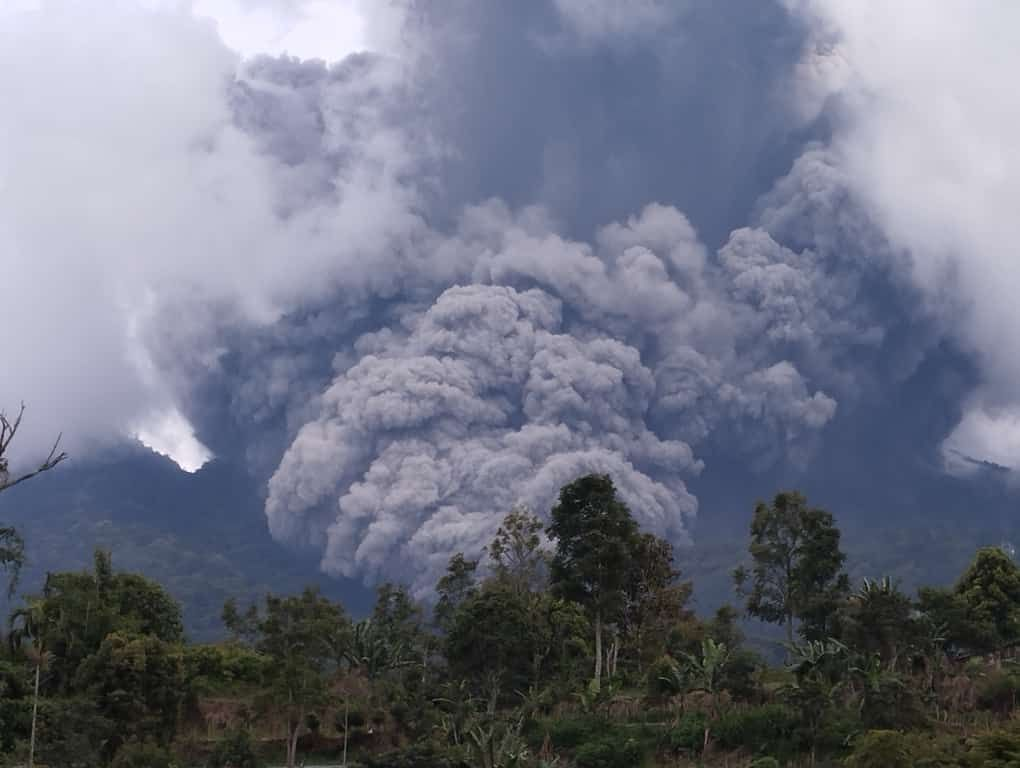
Sudden eruption of Mount Marapi in West Sumatra killed more than a dozen hikers

- 3 December – 2023 eruption of Mount Marapi: Eleven hikers are found dead and thirteen more are missing after Mount Marapi's eruption in West Sumatra.
- 24 December – Thirteen workers are killed and 46 others are injured in a fire at a nickel smelter plant in Sulawesi.
- 27 December – Hundreds of students from multiple universities across Aceh storms a shelter for Rohingya refugees and forces them out of a convention centre in the city of Banda Aceh, demanding them to be deported while chanting anti-refugee slurs. Following the incident, multiple international human rights organizations raises concerns on the matter.

== Deaths ==
=== January ===
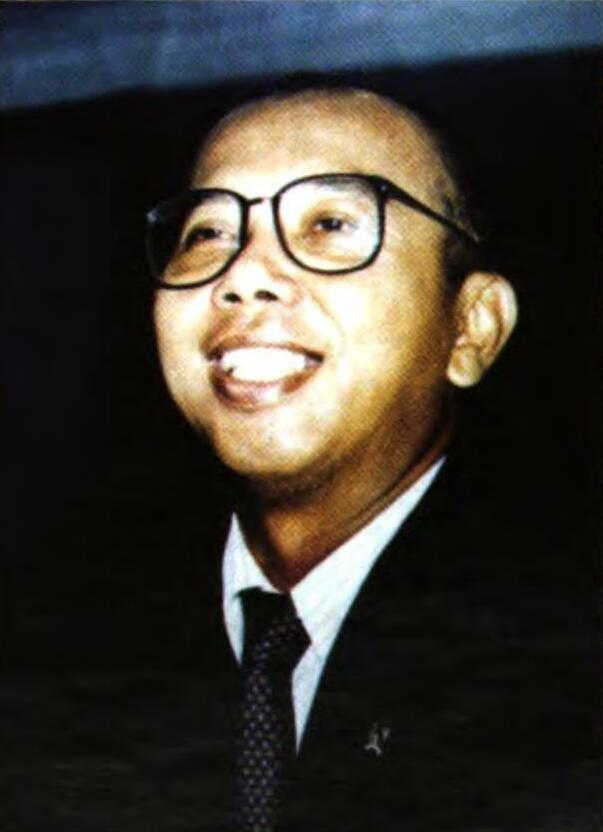
Muhammad Prakosa

- 7–12 January – Hasanuddin Beruh, former regent of Southeast Aceh.
- 17 January – Muhammad Prakosa, the 21st Indonesian Ambassador to Italy, former minister of agriculture & minister of forestry in the Gotong Royong Cabinet.
- 20 January
  - Nano Riantiarno, Indonesian playwright, actor.
  - Harunata, Regent of Lahat
- 25 January – Lieus Sungkharisma, activist and politician.

=== February ===
- 1 February – Benny Dollo, coach of the Indonesian national football team.
- 11 February - Erwan Kurtubi, Indonesian politician, former regent of Pandeglang
- 20 February - Husnie Hentihu, Indonesian politician
- 25 February - Ali Yafie, Leader of Indonesian Ulema Council

=== March ===
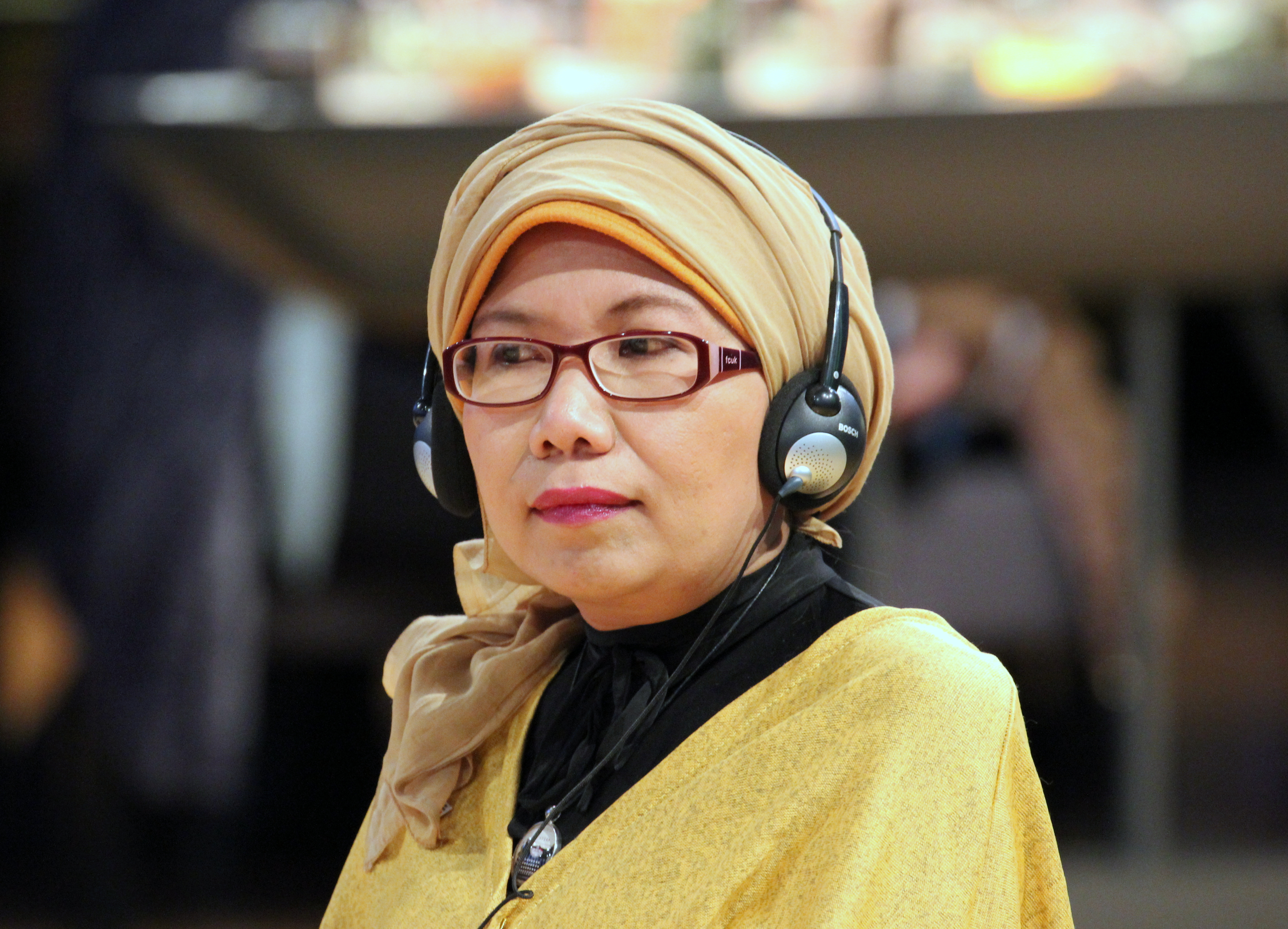
Lily Yulianti Farid

- 5 March - Azwar Anas, politician
- 6 March - Ikranagara, actor
- 9 March - Lily Yulianti Farid, writer, cultural activist
- 15 March - Nomo Koeswoyo, musician
- 16 March - Nani Widjaja, actress
- 20 March - Syabda Perkasa Belawa, badminton athlete
- 25 March - Novie Chandra, actor
- 28 March - Alis Marajo, politician

=== April ===
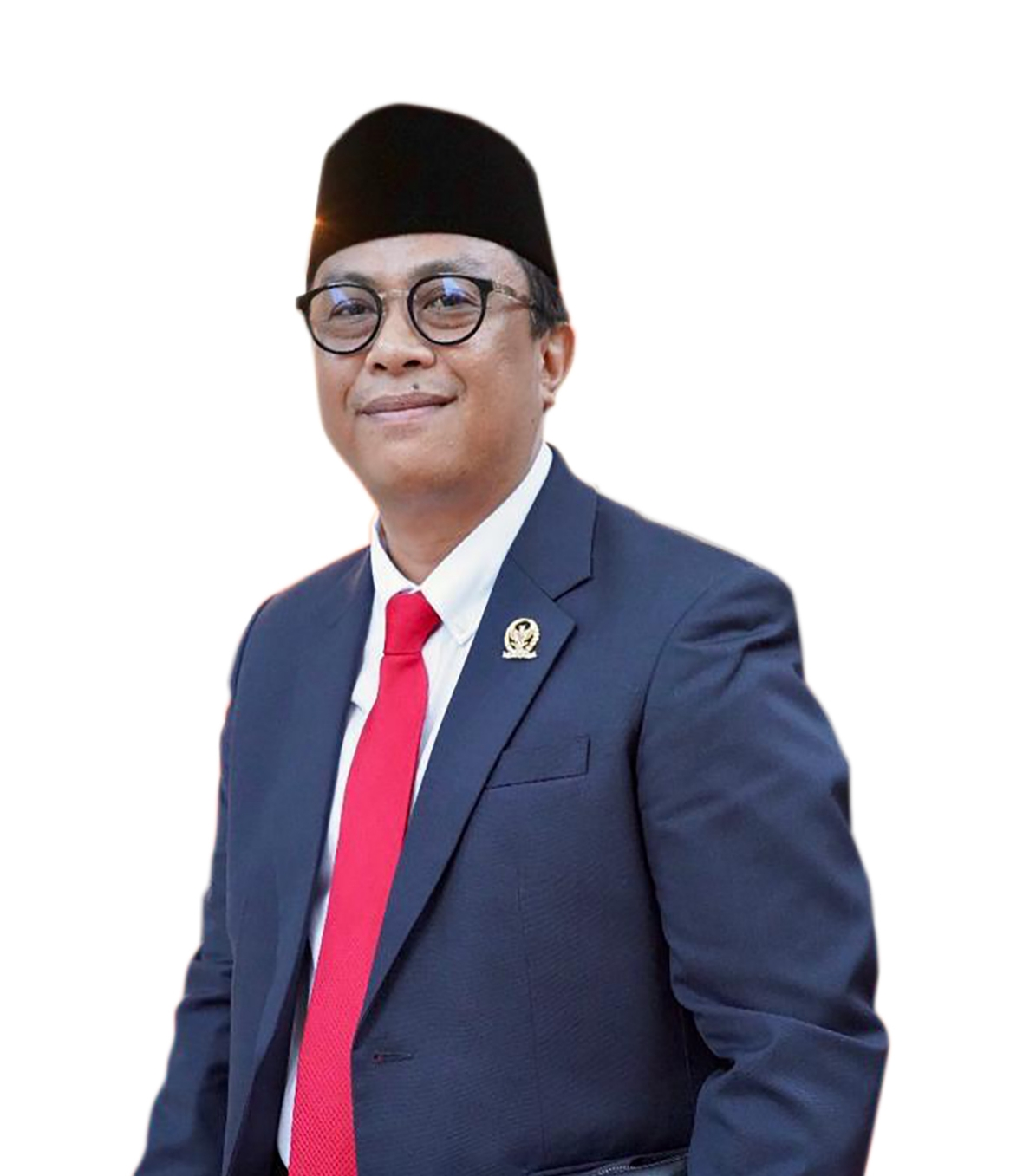
Muhammad Rapsel Ali

- 4 April - Ahyar Abduh politician
- 9 April - Muhammad Rapsel Ali, member of Indonesian House of Representatives
- 19 April - Carlo Saba, singer
- 23 April - Petrus Carnisius Tarcisius Salassa, politician
- 25 April - Iqbal Pakula, actor
- 28 April - David Jacobs, table tennis player

=== May ===
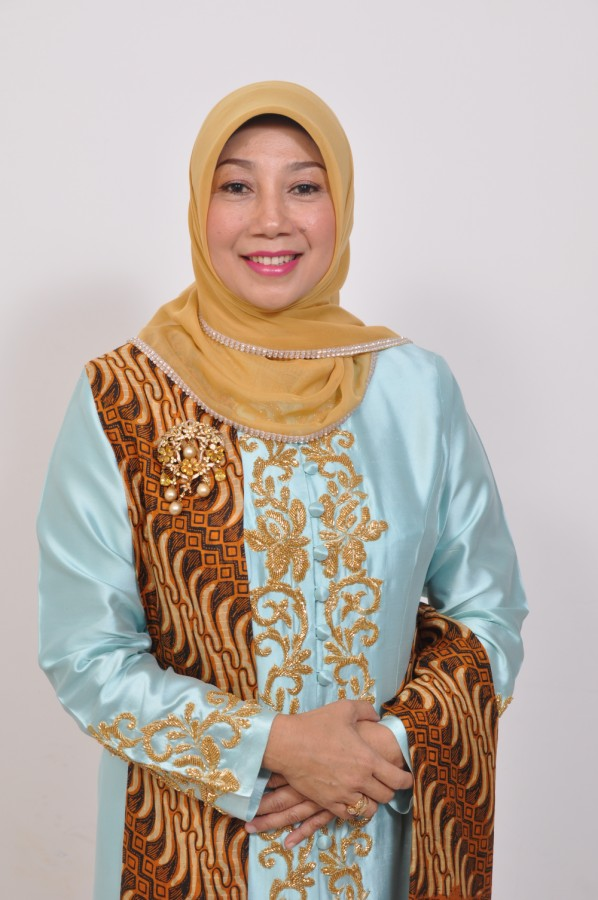
Norbaiti Isran Noor

- 2 May - Achmad Sujudi, former Minister of Health
- 3 May - Razie Jachya, former governor of Bengkulu
- 4 May - Achmad Mubarok, academian, politician
- 6 May -Paulus Moa, politician, former Regent of Sikka
- 7 May - Imran Duru, Deputy Regent of Alor
- 11 May - Taufik Imansyah, news anchor
- 18 May
  - Syafrianto Rusli, football coach
  - Hasanuddin Murad, politician
- 22 May -Eeng Saptahadi, actor
- 24 May - Norbaiti Isran Noor, politician
- 26 May -Sarwono Kusumaatmadja, former Indonesian minister
- 28 May -Whisnu Sakti Buana, politician

=== June ===
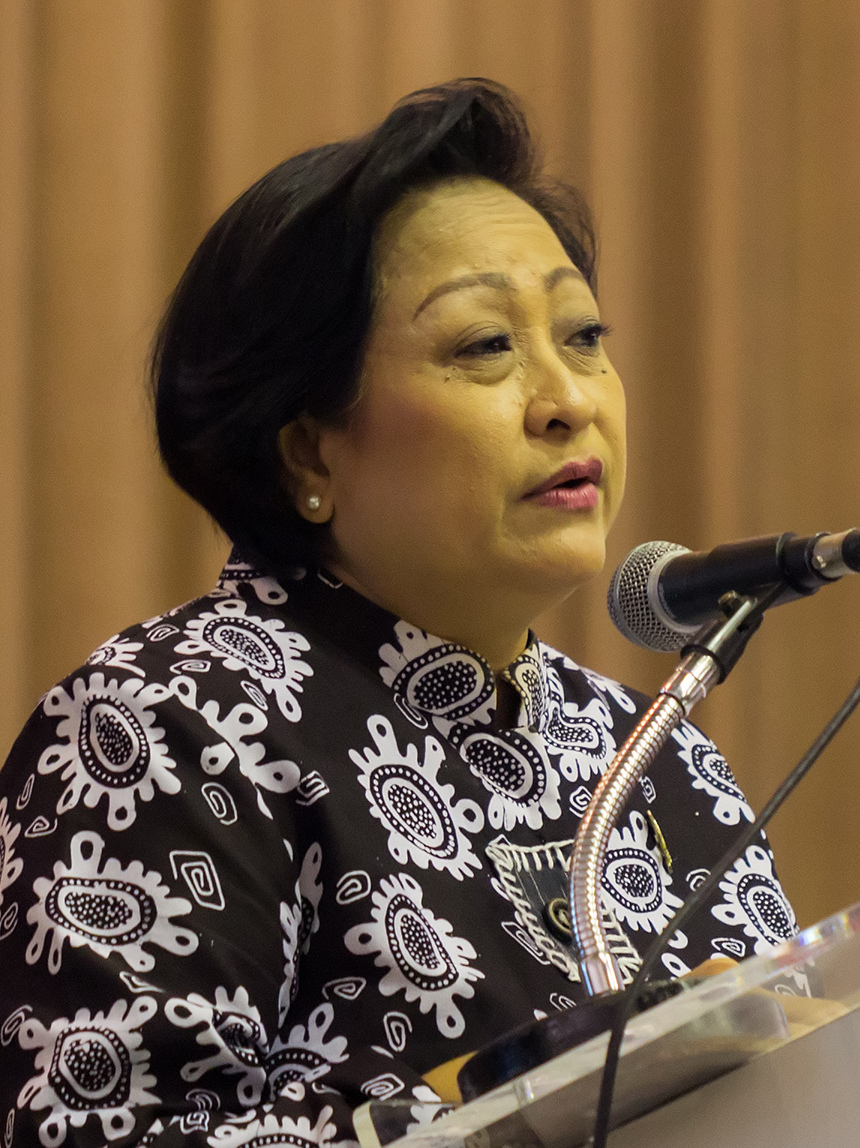
Sri Adiningsih

- 1 June - Rachmat Djoko Pradopo, writer
- 4 June - Mochtar Pabottingi, essayist, political science researcher
- 8 June - Nugroho Wisnumurti, diplomat, former Indonesian Permanent Representative to the United Nations
- 17 June - Sri Adiningsih, politician, former chairperson of President Advisory Council
- 22 June - Stevanus Vreeke Runtu, politician, former Regent of Minahasa
- 24 June – Desmond Junaidi Mahesa, politician
- 27 June - Rudolf Pardede, politician, former governor of North Sumatra

=== July ===
- 5 July - Eddy Bakar Pare, actor
- 19 July - Bambang Kristiono, politician
- 30 July - Ichsan Loulembah, politician, journalist

=== August ===
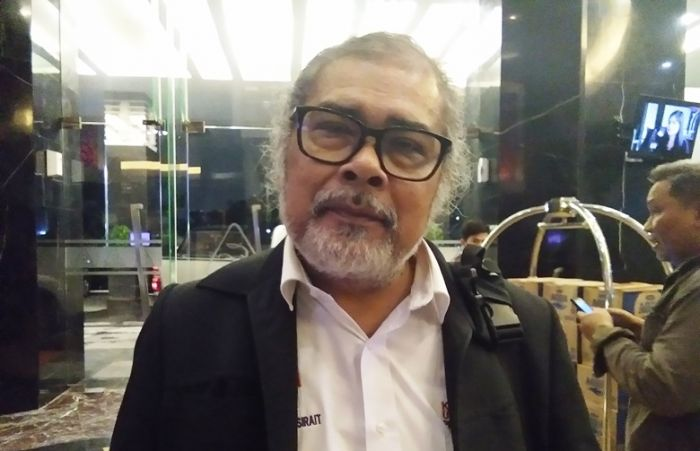
Arist Merdeka Sirait

- 6 August - Nirwan Ahmad Arsuka, literary activist
- 8 August - Raharja Waluya Jati, pro-democracy activist
- 11 August - Roem Rowi, Islamic scholar
- 12 August - Djoko Pekik, painter
- 17 August - Marga T, writer
- 25 August - Ismet Ahmad, academic, politician
- 26 August - Arist Merdeka Sirait, activist, Head of Indonesian Child Protection Commission (KPAI)

=== September ===
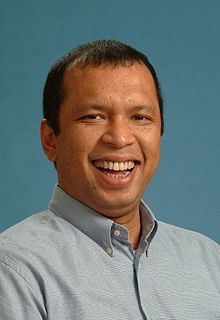
Handry Satriago

- 1 September - Amin Syam, politician, former governor of South Sulawesi
- 4 September - Yunus Bandu, politician, former Regent of Sidenreng Rappang
- 8 September - Adi Winarso, politician, former mayor of Tegal
- 13 September - Eko Agus Prawoto, architect
- 15 September - Theo Toemion, politician
- 16 September - Handry Satriago, businessman

=== October ===
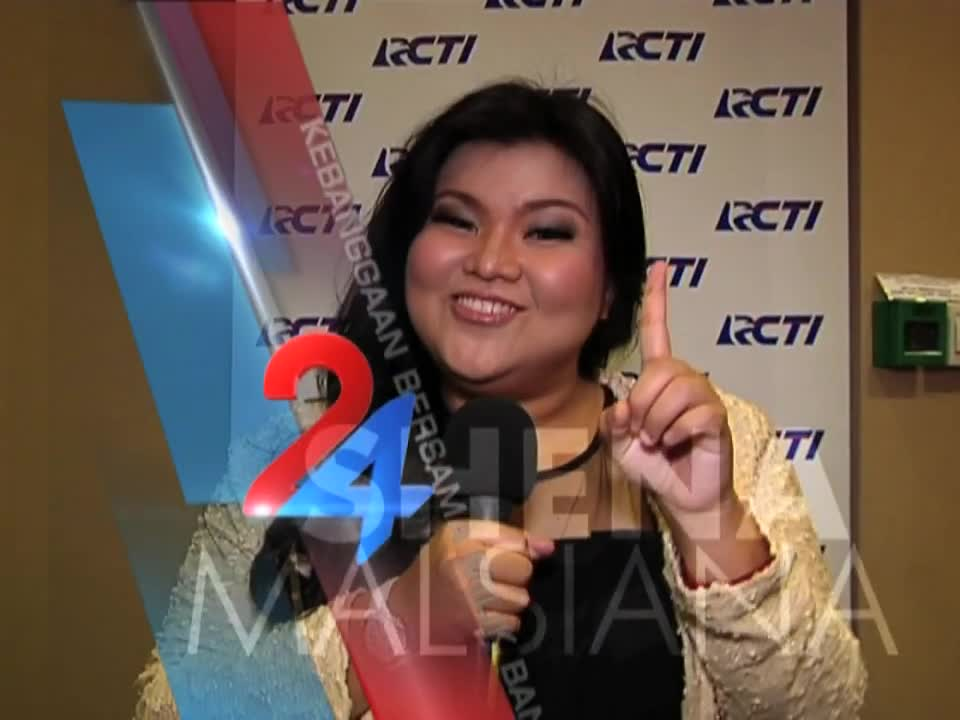
Shena Malsiana

- 14 October - Gembong Warsono, politician
- 17 October - Syamsul Arifin, politician, former governor of North Sumatra
- 25 October - Shena Malsiana, singer, radio host
- 28 October - Ali Mukhni, politician, former Regent of Pariaman

=== November ===
- 5 November - Usman Sidik, Regent of South Halmahera
- 10 November - Muhammad Sodiqin, campursari singer
- 12 November - Kusuma Wardhani, archer
- 13 November
  - T. B. Silalahi, politician, military officer
  - Sjachrani Mataja, politician
- 24 November - Eko Londo, comedian, member of Srimulat
- 30 November - Eddy Rumpoko, politician, former mayor of Batu

=== December ===
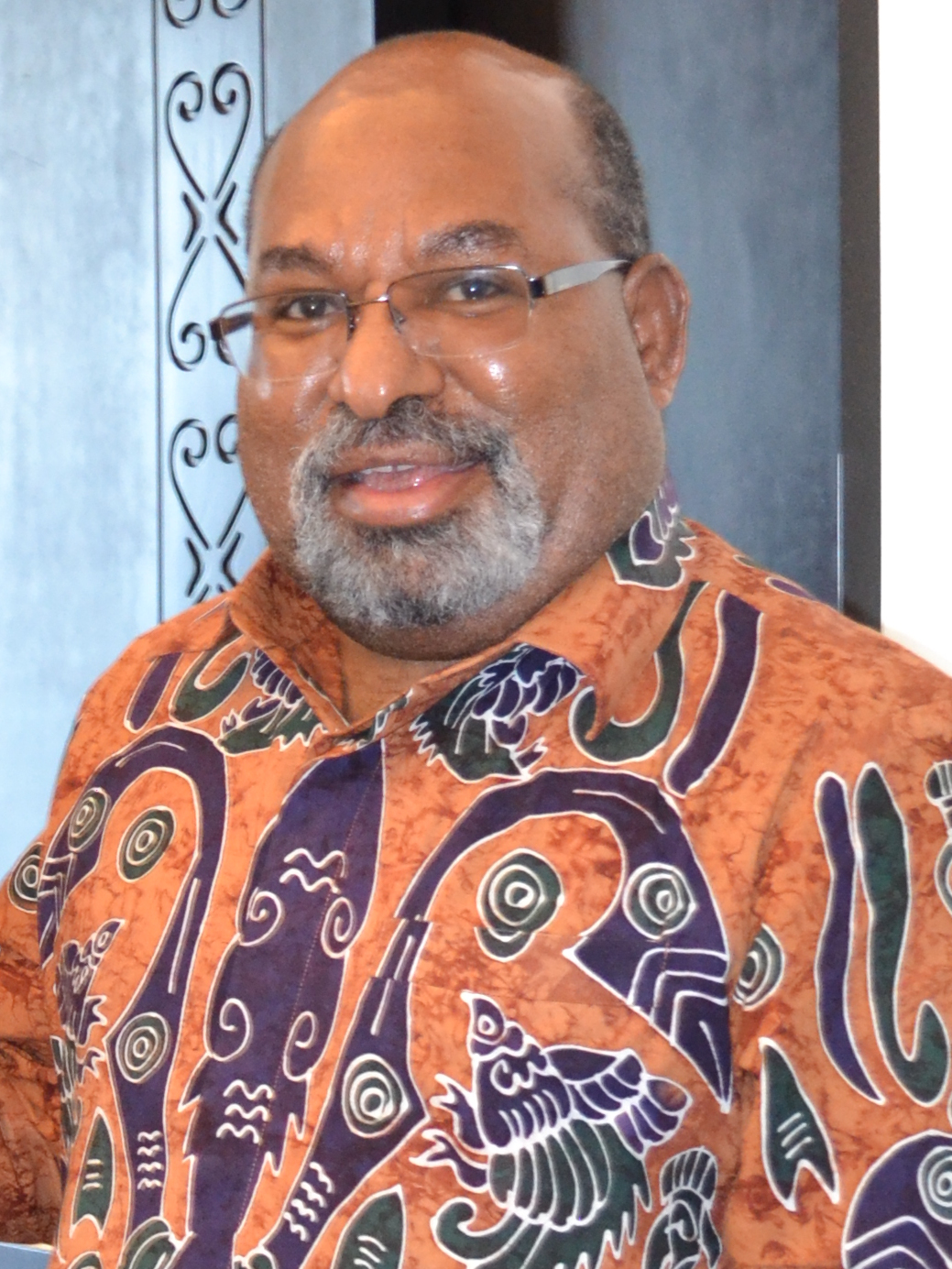
Lukas Enembe

- 1 December - Kiki Fatmala, actress
- 3 December – Doni Monardo, Former Chair of BNPB, TNI AD, and COVID-19 Task Force.
- 6 December - Nur Yasin, politician
- 7 December - Hamka Haq, politician
- 8 December - Yayu Unru, actor, acting coach
- 17 December - Kuntoro Mangkusubroto, former Minister of Mines and Energy
- 25 December - Yudo Paripurno, politician
- 26 Desember – Lukas Enembe, Former Governor of Papua
- 28 December - Hardi, painter
