= Ismet Ahmad =

Indonesian academic and politician (1945–2023)

Ismet Ahmed

Member of the People's Representative Council
- In office 1 October 2009 – 1 October 2014
- Constituency: South Kalimantan I

Personal details
- Born: 26 February 1945 Hulu Sungai Selatan, South Kalimantan, Japanese-occupied Dutch East Indies
- Died: 25 August 2023 (aged 78) Banjarbaru, South Kalimantan, Indonesia
- Party: PAN
- Spouse: Fauthyda Ismet
- Children: 2
- Education: Lambung Mangkurat University (Ir.); University of the Philippines Los Baños (M.Sc.); University of Florida (Ph.D.)

Ismet Ahmed (26 February 1945 – 25 August 2023) was an Indonesian academic, bureaucrat, and politician. He was a member of the People's Representative Council from 2009 until 2014. He also served as a bureaucrat in the South Kalimantan government and as a professor of agricultural economics at Lambung Mangkurat University.

== Education and academic career ==
Ismet Ahmad was born in Negara, a small town in the South Hulu Sungai locality, on 26 February 1945, as the son of Ahmad and Majehan. Upon completing his primary education at a local state elementary school in 1957, he moved to Barabai in Central Hulu Sungai, where he attended a state junior high school. He then moved to Banjarbaru and enrolled at a state agricultural high school. He received his high school diploma in 1963 and continued to study agriculture at the Lambung Mangkurat University (ULM) in Banjarbaru. During his time in the university, Ismet joined the Suryanata student regiment, a paramilitary student organization.

Ismet graduated from the university in 1970 and began teaching at his alma mater. Four years later, in 1974 Ismet received a scholarship from the Ford Foundation to pursue postgraduate studies at the University of the Philippines Los Baños. After completing his postgraduate studies in 1976, Ismet became the vice dean of ULM's agriculture faculty. He resigned from the position two years later after receiving scholarship to study at the University of Florida from the Rockefeller Foundation's Agricultural Development Council. He became a member of a Muslim student union in the university and received his Ph.D. in economic development in 1982.

Upon returning from the United States, ULM's rector appointed him as the dean of the agriculture faculty. During his tenure as faculty dean, he founded the agricultural socioeconomics major (later renamed to agribusiness). Ismet retained his position as dean until 1989.

== Bureaucratic and political career ==
Ismet began his career in the government as the deputy chief of South Kalimantan's investment board in 1989. He consequently held several high ranking position in South Kalimantan provincial government, such as the chief of investment board in 1993, head of the development agency in 1996, and assistant to the provincial secretary in 2001. In 2003, governor Sjachriel Darham appointed him as provincial secretary, the most senior bureaucratic office in the provincial government.

Ismet's stint as provincial secretary did not last long, as on 15 October 2004 the governor issued a decree which dismissed him from the position. Ismet challenged the decree and brought the case to the administrative court. The court later ordered Ismet to retain his position as provincial secretary. The court's decision was further reinforced by a formal request from the Minister of Home Affairs to the governor. As a result, Ismet held the office of provincial secretary until his retirement in 2006.

In 2005, Ismet was nominated as the governor of South Kalimantan by the National Mandate Party and the Prosperous Justice Party. He was paired with Aboe Bakar Al-Habsyi, a Muslim cleric and politician from the Prosperous Justice Party. During the campaign period, Ismet's campaign team reported Rudy Ariffin—another candidate who was supported by the National Awakening Party and the United Development Party—for bribing voters in the Tanah Laut Region. Ismet, who obtained 28% of the votes, lost the election to Rudy Ariffin.

In the 2009 Indonesian legislative election, Ismet was elected to the parliament as a representative of the South Kalimantan I electoral district. He served as a member of commission XI, which oversees finance, national development planning, banking, and non-bank financial institutions. Ismet also joined the National Financial Accountability Agency (BAKN) and recommended that the Audit Board of Indonesia conduct risk-based audits to improve national financial oversight. Ismet also proposed a railway system for South Kalimantan, which would connect isolated regions in the province. He expressed disappointment with the local community, especially in South Kalimantan, for flocking to Java while neglecting their own land.

== Personal life and death ==
Ismet was married to Fauthyda and had two children. He died at the Idaman Hospital in Banjarbaru, on 25 August 2023, at age 78.
