= Al-Habsi =

Al-Habsi (Arabic: الحبسي) is an Omani surname. Notable people with the surname include:

- Ali Al-Habsi (born 1981), Omani footballer
- Juma Al-Habsi (born 1996), Omani footballer
- Mohammed Al-Habsi (born 1991), Omani swimmer
- Shinoona Salah Al-Habsi (born 1993), Omani runner
- Aboe Bakar Al-Habsyi (born 1964), Indonesian politician ("Abu Bakar" means "father of lad camels" in Arabic and "burnt ash" in Indonesian)
