= Hasanuddin Murad =

Indonesian politician (1957–2023)

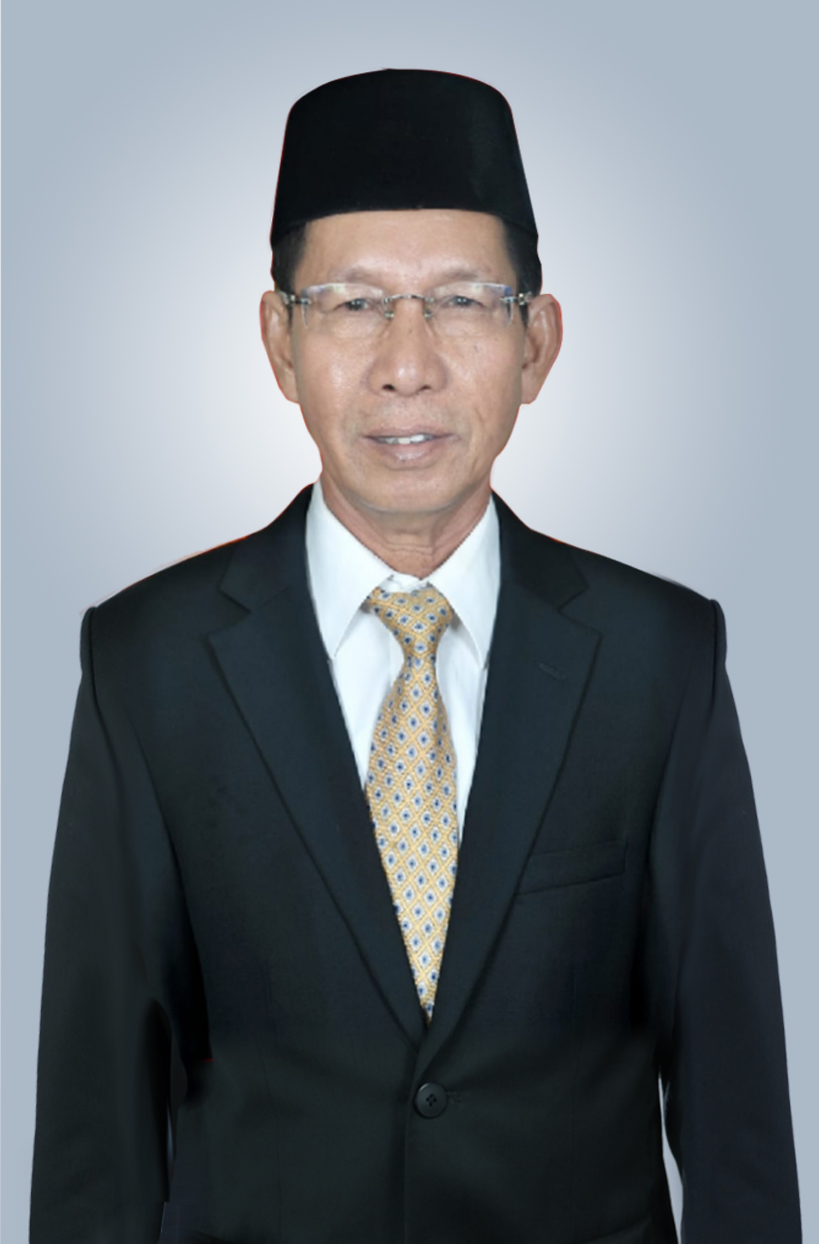

Member of the South Kalimantan Regional People's Representative Council
- In office 9 September 2019 – 18 May 2023
- Constituency: South Kalimantan 3

Regent of Barito Kuala
- In office 3 November 2007 – 4 November 2017
- Governor: Rudy Ariffin; Sahbirin Noor
- Lieutenant: Sukardhi; Makmun Kaderi
- Preceded by: Eddy Sukarma
- Succeeded by: Noormiliyani Aberani Sulaiman

Member of the People's Representative Council
- In office 1 October 1999 – 2004
- Constituency: Barito Kuala
- In office 2004 – 1 October 2009
- Constituency: South Kalimantan

Personal details
- Born: 10 October 1957 Marabahan, Barito Kuala, South Kalimantan, Indonesia
- Died: 18 May 2023 (aged 65) Kuala Lumpur, Malaysia
- Party: Golkar
- Spouse: Noormiliyani Aberani Sulaiman

Hasanuddin Murad (10 October 1957 – 18 May 2023) was an Indonesian politician affiliated with the Golkar Party. He had served in the legislature as a member of the People's Representative Council (DPR) from 1999 until 2007 and the South Kalimantan Regional People's Representative Council (DPRD) from 2019 until his death in 2023. Murad also served as the regent in his birthplace, Barito Kuala, from 2007 until 2017.

== Early life and education ==
Hasanuddin Murad was born on 10 October 1957 in Marabahan, Barito Kuala, South Kalimantan, from the couple Abdul Murad and Badariah. Both of his parents were of Bakumpai ethnicity and worked as farmers. Murad completed his basic education at the Banjarmasin 7th State Junior High School (1971–1973) and Banjarmasin 28th Vocational Junior High School (1975–1977). During his time at the vocational junior high school, Murad became the chairman of Banjarmasin's social youth association and the school's student council.

Upon completing junior high school, Murad continued his education at a Muhammadiyah-run high school in Banjarmasin. He then began studying law at the Lambung Mangkurat University (Unlam) from 1978 until 1986. Murad began working during his time in the university, being the director of the Cipta Guna Marabahan company from 1982 until 1986 and the chairman of the student senate of Unlam's law faculty.

Murad completed his law education in 1986 and began teaching law at the Lambung Mangkurat University. Murad continued to study during his teaching career. He attended a post-graduate course on classic and contemporary social science theory at the Gadjah Mada University in 1986. He also attended non-degree postgraduate studies at the Satyagama University from 1999 until 2000.

== Political career ==
Murad's political career began after his graduation from the university. He joined Kosgoro, a mass organization related to the state-sponsored Golkar Party. He became the youth chief of the organization in 1986. He later joined the National Youth Committee (KNPI, Komite Nasional Pemuda Indonesia) and became the deputy leader of KNPI in South Kalimantan for seven years. After being involved in youth organizations for several years, Murad eventually joined Golkar, becoming a staff member in the research and development section of the party. He became the chief of the party's organization bureau in South Kalimantan in 1999.

Murad's involvement in the Golkar Party led to his positions in the national legislative bodies. He was elected to the DPR in the 1999 Indonesian legislative election, representing Barito Kuala Regency. During his first term, Murad was seated in Commission IV of the People's Representative Council, which handles transport and infrastructure. He was involved in several special committees in DPR, such as the special committee on Aceh and the special committee on the protection and development of manpower.

Murad was nominated again for a seat in the People's Representative Council in 2004. He was nominated by Golkar for the South Kalimantan constituency and obtained 40,399 votes, thus allowing him a seat in DPR for a second term. During his second term, Murad continued to handle transport and infrastructure. He was seated in the lawmaking body of the DPR and was involved in formulating several bills, such as the bill on Aceh, manpower development and protection, building, industrial dispute settlement, water resources, pornography, information and electronic transactions, the elimination of racial and ethnic discrimination, spatial planning, railways, shipping, aviation, and traffic and highways.

In 2007, Murad resigned from the People's Representative Council after being elected as the Regent of Barito Kuala, his birthplace. He was re-elected for the same position in 2012. During his tenure, Murad frequently met with farmers and engaged in the construction of roads, bridges, and irrigation to support local agriculture. At the end of his second term, in 2016 nine villages in the regency began receiving electricity from the local power grid. Murad was succeeded by Noormiliyani Aberani Sulaiman, his wife, in 2017. Noormiliyani previously served as the speaker of the South Kalimantan Regional People's Representative Council.

After the end of his term as regent, Murad was nominated for the South Kalimantan Regional People's Representative Council in the 2019 Indonesian general election, representing Barito Kuala. Murad initially wanted to run as a senator, but his wish was rejected by the Golkar party, who instructed him to ran for the local legislature instead. Murad obtained 40,482 votes in the election and obtained a seat. He was a strong candidate for the speaker of the council but lost the political bidding. He then became the chairman of the council's commission for development and infrastructure.

== Personal life and death ==
Hasanuddin Murad was married to Noormiliyani Aberani Sulaiman. The couple has a child.

Murad died on the afternoon of 18 May 2023 at the Gleneagles Hospital Kuala Lumpur. He was 65. His body arrived in Indonesia later that night, and was buried at the Taman Bahagia Cemetery the next day.
