= Kerukunan Waria dan Bissu Sulawesi Selatan =

Kerukunan Waria dan Bissu Sulawesi Selatan was a transgender organization located in South Sulawesi.

== History ==
The member of organization was already gathered in 1992 in an informal setting by holding Sports and Arts Week. Then, they planned to initiate the organization after Sports and Arts Week 1996 in Bulukumba. After the initiiotion, they regularly held the Sports and Arts Week annually. IA year later, at one of the members' houses, Haji Nur's in Amparita, they called themselves Kerukunan Waria Sulawesi Selatan (KWRSS), which means South Sulawesi Waria Association. Then, in 1998, during the Sports and Arts Week in Bola Soba, Bone Regency, they appointed Mami Fitri as the chairperson of the organization. The organization was officially recognized in 1999. In 2015, they changed their name to Kerukunan Waria Bissu Sulawesi Selatan to include the Bissu in their organization.

== Sports and Arts Week and cancellation ==
As they held the Sports and Arts Week annually, they also had the opportunity to invite Amin Syam to attend their event in Pinrang. In 2017, their regular Sports and Arts Week, which was planned to be held in Soppeng, was forcibly disbanded by the local police due to a lack of permission from the Ministry of Religious Affairs. This situation was also caused by the rejection of a local religious organization called Forum Umat Islam Soppeng, which reported it to the Soppeng Regency Regional People's Representative Council. The organization regarded this disbandment as a limitation of freedom of expression. Next year, the event was held once again in Dua Boccoe, but it was disbanded and became the last time it was held.

== Works ==
The organization is helding research project called "Project Budaya Bone" as partnership with researcher from Bone since 2022.
