= Manulife Indonesia =

Indonesian insurance company

Manulife Indonesia is an Indonesian insurance company. Stevanus Vreeke Runtu was employed there as the company's assistant manager from 1999 to 2002.
