= Yunus Bandu =

Indonesian military officer and politician (1942–2023)

Regent of Luwu
- In office 1994–1999
- Preceded by: Muh. Dahlan Jampu
- Succeeded by: Kamrul Kasim

Regent of Sidenreng Rappang
- In office 28 July 1988 – 1993
- Preceded by: Opu Sidik
- Succeeded by: A. Salipolo Pallaloi

Personal details
- Born: 14 July 1942 Kalosi, Enrekang Regency, Japanese-occupied Dutch East Indies
- Died: 4 September 2023 (aged 81) Makassar, Indonesia
- Party: Golkar

Military service
- Allegiance: Indonesia
- Branch/service: Indonesian Army
- Years of service: 1966–1999
- Rank: Colonel
- Unit: Infantry

Yunus Bandu (14 July 1942 – 4 September 2023) was an Indonesian military officer and politician. A member of Golkar, he served as regent (district chief) of Sidenreng Rappang from 1988 to 1993 and regent of Luwu from 1994 to 1999.

== Career ==
Yunus was born in Kalosi, a small town in South Sulawesi, on 14 July 1942. Upon completing high school, he entered the Indonesian Military Academy. He joined the military as a second lieutenant in 1966 and ascended the ranks until he became a lieutenant colonel. He briefly became the commander of the Cianjur military district for several months in 1983. He was reassigned to Central Sulawesi, where he became chief of staff of the province's military area.

Several years into his office as chief of staff, he was voted into office by the local council as the regent of Sidenreng Rappang. He was installed on 28 July 1988, replacing Opu Sidik. During his tenure, Yunus Bandu established a forum known as 'tudang sipulung' (lit. 'sitting together'). This forum served as a platform for agricultural officials, farmers, and elders to discuss agricultural matters.

Yunus' term as regent in Sidenreng Rappang ended in 1993. The central government nominated him for the same position in the Luwu Regency. His nomination faced strong opposition from local groups, with demands to reject his candidacy. The government rejected the demands and Yunus was elected as regent. During his term in Luwu, Yunus proposed the construction of an Islamic centre; this plan was not realized till after the end of his term as regent.

Also in 1993, the South Sulawesi branch of Golkar held a local conference to elect a new chairman. Yunus, alongside Regent of Enrekang Amin Syam, were the strongest candidates for the post. After Yunus withdrew his candidacy, Amin Syam was elected without any opposition.

Yunus died on 4 September 2023 at the Wahidin Sudirohusodo hospital in Makassar. He was 81.
