= Stevanus Vreeke Runtu =

Indonesian politician (1958–2023)

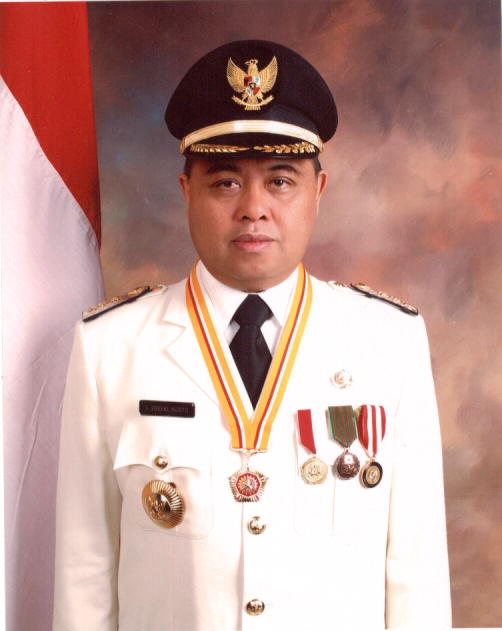

Regent of Minahasa
- In office 17 March 2003 – 17 March 2013
- Preceded by: Dolfie Tanor
- Succeeded by: Jantje Wowiling Sajow

Member of Minahasa Regional People's Representative Council
- In office 1987–2002

Personal details
- Born: 22 December 1958 Tondano, Minahasa, Indonesia
- Died: 22 June 2023 (aged 64) Manado, North Sulawesi, Indonesia
- Party: Golkar
- Spouse: Norma Zeny Luntas
- Children: 2
- Education: Merdeka School of Political and Social Sciences

Stevanus Vreeke Runtu (22 December 1958 – 22 June 2023) was an Indonesian politician. He was the Regent of Minahasa from 2003 until 2013. Prior to becoming a regent, Runtu was a longtime member of the Minahasa Regional People's Representative Council, having served in the council from 1987 until 2002.

== Education and career ==
Runtu was born in Tondano, the capital of Minahasa, on 22 December 1958. Upon completing high school, he studied at the Merdeka School of Political and Social Sciences (STISIP, Sekolah Tinggi Ilmu Sosial dan Ilmu Politik), a college established by the North Sulawesi (Merdeka) Regional Military Command. During his studies in the college, he joined the Panca Marga Youth Organization and the Amateur Radio Organization of Indonesia. He also chaired the school's student senate from 1984 until 1986.

After graduating from the Merdeka STISIP, Runtu worked in the private sector and became the manager of several companies. He worked as the deputy director and director of the Dwi Karya limited partnership business, the manager of the Inspirasi village cooperative from 1991 until 1993, commissioner of the Vidar Abadi Perkasa company from 1992 until 2000, and the assistant manager of Manulife Indonesia insurance from 1999 until 2002.

== Political career ==
Runtu began to be involved in politics while he was in college. He was elected as the deputy chairman of AMPI, the youth wing of the then-government's party Golkar, in 1985. The next year, Runtu was elected for the same position in KNPI, the umbrella organization for all state-sanctioned youth organizations, and Kosgoro, another Golkar wing. He was elected to Minahasa's Regional Representative Council in the 1987 Indonesian legislative election from Golkar and was reelected in 1992, 1997, and 1999. His career began to rise in the Golkar, with him being the deputy chairman of the Golkar party in Minahasa from 1993 until 1998.

Runtu was elected as the Regent of Minahasa by an indirect election held by the Minahasa's Regional Representative Council in 2002. Runtu successfully ran for a second term in December 2007 and served as regent until 2013. During his tenure, Runtu began reducing the number of civil servants in Minahasa's regional government by not holding a yearly civil servant recruitment. The amount of civil servants at that time numbered around eight thousand, twice above the recommended amount. Vreeke stated that the excessive amount of civil servants resulted in an unclear job assignment for civil servants and a waste of government expenditure. In education, Runtu initiated the construction of a college for civil servants and allocated scholarship funds for Minahasa citizens who were studying overseas.

Runtu's career in Golkar slowly rose along with his position as regent. He became the chairman of Minahasa's Golkar from 1998 until 2008 and the chairman of North Sulawesi's Golkar from 2009 until 2015. Runtu decided to name his son, Careig Runtu, as the chairman of Minahasa's Golkar, which sparked protests from political observers and Golkar members.

In 2010, Runtu decided to run as a gubernatorial candidate with Marlina Moha Siahaan, the regent of Bolaang Mongondow, as his running mate. Runtu lost the election in August 2010 and the pair was investigated by the North Sulawesi police as a witness for a corruption case relating to the procurement of firetrucks in October.

Runtu announced his intention to run as a candidate in the 2020 North Sulawesi gubernatorial election, but failed to secure his candidacy.

== Personal life and death ==
Runtu was married to Norma Zeny Luntas. The couple has two children.

Runtu died on the morning of 22 June 2023 at the Prof. Kandou Hospital in Manado. He was 64.
