= Nur Yasin =

Indonesian politician (1954–2023)

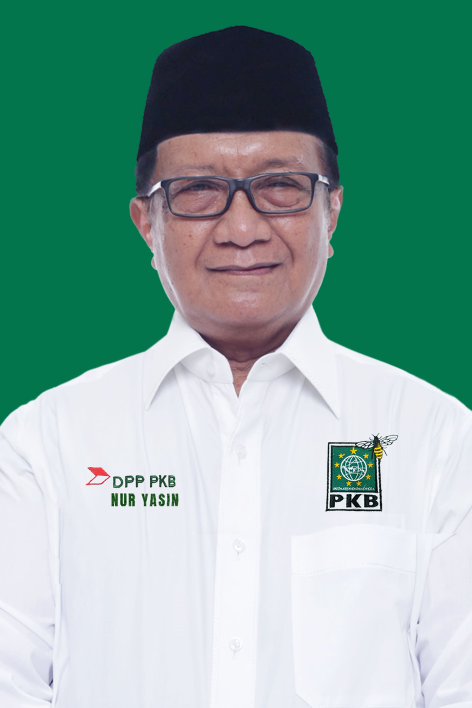
- Yasin in 2023

Member of the House of Representatives of Indonesia for East Java IV
- In office 1 October 2009 – 30 September 2014
- In office 2018 – 6 December 2023

Personal details
- Born: 7 August 1954 Jember Regency, Indonesia
- Died: 6 December 2023 (aged 69)
- Party: PKB
- Education: Bandung Institute of Technology; University of Indonesia

Nur Yasin (7 August 1954 – 6 December 2023) was an Indonesian politician from East Java. He served as a DPR-RI legislator representing Jember Regency and Lumajang Regency for a total of about 10 years, between 2009 and his death in December 2023.

== Career and death ==
Nur Yasin was born on 7 August 1954 in Jember Regency, East Java, Indonesia.

A member of the National Awakening Party, he served in the House of Representatives from 2009 to 2014 and again from 2018 until his death.

Yasin died on 6 December 2023, at the age of 69.
