= Indonesian Ulema Council shooting =

2023 mass shooting in Jakarta, Indonesia

- Location: Indonesian Ulema Council Headquarters, Menteng, Central Jakarta, Jakarta, Indonesia
- Date: 2 May 2023; 3 years ago 11:00 WIB (UTC+7)
- Target: Indonesian Ulema Council officials Government officials
- Attack type: Shooting
- Weapon: Glock Modified airgun
- Deaths: 1 (perpetrator)
- Injuries: 2
- Perpetrator: Lone wolf
- Motive: Messiah complex Attracting public and government officials' attention to the perpetrator's claim of prophethood

On 2 May 2023, at around 11:00 Western Indonesia Time (UTC+7), a shooting occurred at the Indonesian Ulema Council (Indonesian: Majelis Ulama Indonesia, MUI) headquarters in Central Jakarta, Jakarta, Indonesia. A male assailant attacked Indonesian Ulema Council headquarters with a modified airsoft gun, but it was later revealed that the weapon used by the attacker was an airgun. The assailant reportedly died, while two Indonesian Ulema Council employees were injured.

== Attack ==
The attack involved a lone male attacker that attempted to meet Kyai Haji Miftachul Achyar, one of the leaders of MUI. He approached the reception area and asked to meet Achyar. Suddenly, the attacker drew an airgun and fired several shots. The shots hit glass doors. It was later revealed that three shots were randomly fired by the attacker. During the panic, one employee was hit by a ricocheted bullet, and another one was injured due to hitting broken glass during their escape. At the time of the attack, MUI leadership was holding a special meeting.

After firing, the attacker attempted to flee the scene, but was pursued by MUI guards and employees. Suddenly, the attacker fainted and collapsed, and was subsequently neutralized by the guards. The attacker was then brought to Menteng police station, and later transferred to Menteng Health Center. Police announced that the attacker died there. Police emphasized that the attacker died at the Health Center, and that they did not cause the attacker's death.

== Perpetrator ==
The perpetrator was later identified as a man named Mustofa or Mustopa NR, a 60-year-old resident of Sukajaya Village, Pesawaran Regency, Lampung. He had claimed prophethood. Police later released a statement that the perpetrator had been convicted in 2016 for vandalism by the Lampung Regional Representative Council office and had already served his sentence. Police revealed that during this period, he often claimed that he was a "representative of Muhammad". The attacker's family had acknowledged the identity of the attacker. The Sukajaya village head, Tarmizi, acknowledged that the attacker was one of his villagers, and said that the attacker was a cocoa farmer along with his wife. He also said that the attacker had not joined any religious group to his knowledge. However, the neighboring locals reported that the attacker often claimed to his neighbors that he was a prophet. The locals, however, paid little attention and had gotten used to his claims. Despite his beliefs and claims, locals were not irritated or annoyed by him due to his kindness and generous gift-giving.

Anwar Abbas, Vice General Secretary of MUI, revealed that the attacker had previously attempted to meet Achyar and tried to discuss his teaching with him. He revealed that the attacker also sent several inflammatory and threatening letters to MUI. Cholil Nafis, one of the leaders of MUI, also revealed that in the last two letters, the attacker had expressed his frustration caused by the lack of attention t of his teaching and later threatened to attack MUI with guns and knives. MUI later revealed that the attacker had sent letters to MUI six times. However, all six letters were ignored as the contents were considered jumbled, incoherent, unspecified, and without focus. During the attack, another MUI official Ikhsan Abdullah stated that the attacker claimed to be God himself.

== Investigation ==
Police discovered several letters written by the perpetrator in his bag. The police confiscated the letters and his other belongings for investigation. One of the letters asked the MUI to acknowledge his prophethood, and the perpetrator claimed that he was a prophet sent by Allah to unify Indonesian Muslims. The perpetrator believed and claimed that by accepting him as the prophet, MUI would have facilitated a greater good. Another discovered letter directed his frustration to the Chief of Metro Jaya Police for not helping him to meet the MUI officials to fulfill his so-called prophethood mission, and asked the Chief to arrest or execute him as the attacker considered himself "useless" for not fulfilling his mission. A bank account book under the name of the attacker was also discovered. Various heart medications and asthma medications were also discovered in the perpetrator's bag, which fit his family's account of his illnesses and health records. However, the police waited for the autopsy results from the coroner. On 5 May 2023, the coroner reported that the perpetrator suffered a massive heart attack after the attack, which contributed to his death.

Police also investigated the attacker's potential connection to a terrorist organization. Later investigation revealed no detectable links to any terrorist organization. The investigation revealed that the attacker was motivated solely by his desire for the MUI to acknowledge his position as a "vice prophet" and "representative of God", based on his skewed interpretation of hadiths on apocalypse and afterlife salvation. Police also uncovered some planning documents authored by the attacker dated back to 2018 revealing a desire to attack MUI and several other government officials if his demands were not fulfilled.

On 9 May 2023, three people were arrested by the police for aiding the perpetrator by providing a weapon for the perpetrator. Police revealed that the perpetrator was also scammed by the weapon's provider, as they provided the perpetrator with a modified air gun instead of the real gun he requested. The main weapon provider was a ranger of the Lampung Province Department of Forestry. He was illegally sold unregistered weapons prior the incident. Eventually, as the facts related to the incident were uncovered, the weapon provider was burdened by the guilt and surrendered himself.

== Responses ==
=== Government reactions ===
Ma'ruf Amin, Vice President of Indonesia, ordered an investigation of the incident. Later, he issued a statement to the public urging Indonesian Muslims to not be provoked by the attack.

Yaqut Cholil Qoumas, Minister of Religious Affairs, condemned the incident and asked law enforcement for a speedy investigation to reveal the attacker's motives. After revelation of the attacker' motives, the minister emphasized the need to learn religion properly so as not to be misguided.

The Regional Representative Council issued a condemnation and emphasized the attack as "an attack against ulemas". A similar condemnation statement was issued by the People's Representative Council.

=== Reactions from religious groups ===
Two major Islamic organizations, Nahdhlatul Ulama and Muhammadiyah, separately issued condemnation statements. Another Islamic organization, PERSIS, also condemned the attack.

Condemnation was also issued by other religious groups, including Catholic Youth.

=== Opposition reactions ===
Prosperous Justice Party, despite condemning the attack, alleged that it was a "diversion" to divert the attention of the public, particularly that of Indonesian Muslims, from the 2024 Indonesian general election.

Din Syamsuddin of Action for Rescuing Indonesia Coalition also claimed that the attacker was infected by Islamophobia and claimed that a similar attack was committed against MUI during 2019 Indonesian general election. However, there was no such attack in 2019.
