= Sjachrani Mataja =

Indonesian politician (1948–2023)

Member of the House of Representatives of Indonesia
- In office 1 October 2014 – 30 September 2019
- Constituency: South Kalimantan II

Regent of Kotabaru
- In office 2000 – 10 August 2010
- Preceded by: Bektam
- Succeeded by: Irhami Ridjani

Personal details
- Born: 11 October 1948 Balikpapan, Dutch East Indies
- Died: 13 November 2023 (aged 75) Banjarbaru, Indonesia
- Party: Gerindra
- Education: STIE IPWIJA Jakarta

Sjachrani Mataja (11 October 1948 – 13 November 2023) was an Indonesian politician. A member of the Gerindra Party, he served in the House of Representatives from 2014 to 2019.

Mataja died in Banjarbaru on 13 November 2023, at the age of 75.
