= Rudy Ariffin =

Indonesian politician (1953–2026)

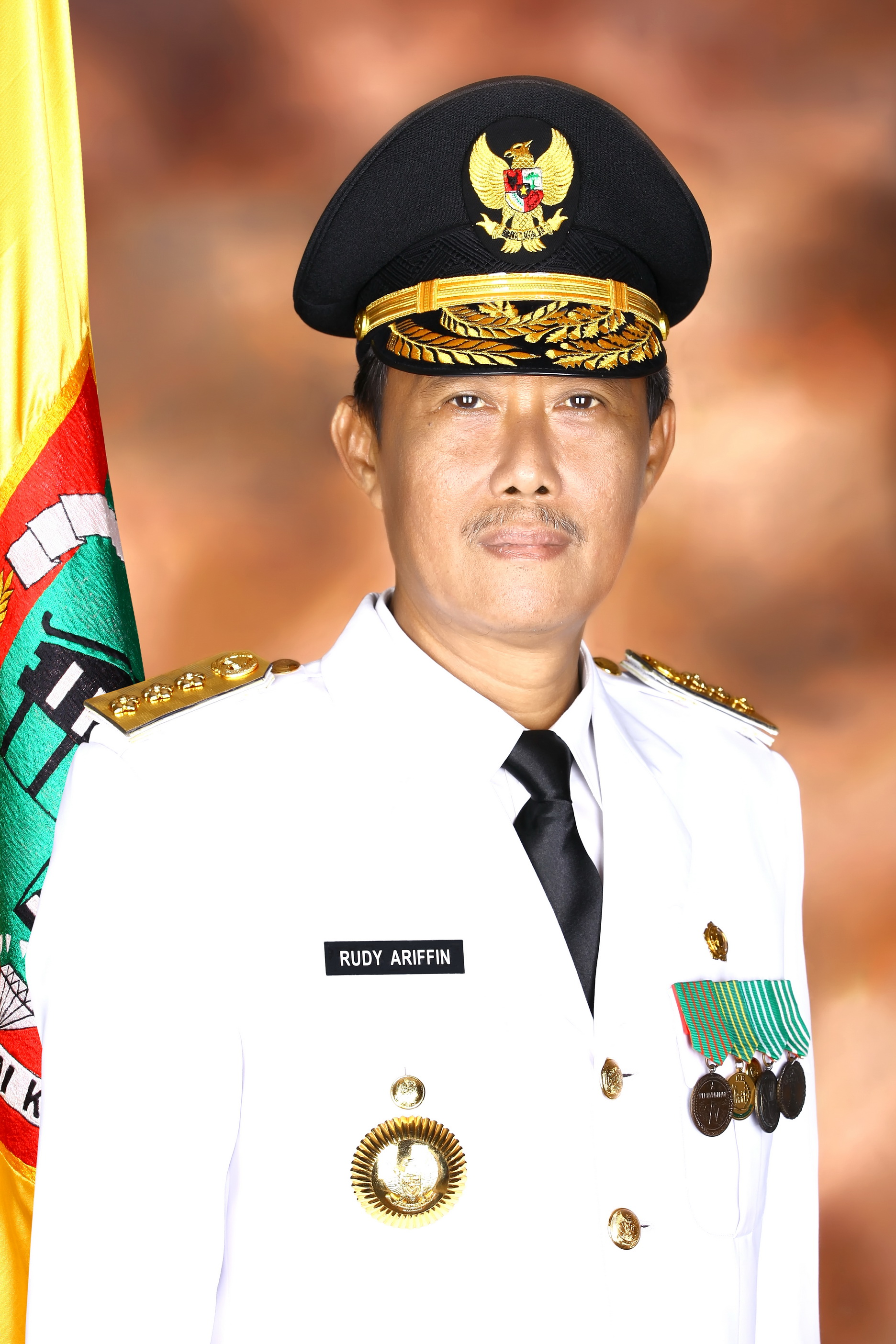
- Ariffin in 2010

Governor of South Kalimantan
- In office 5 August 2005 – 5 August 2015
- Preceded by: Sjachriel Darham
- Succeeded by: Sahbirin Noor

Personal details
- Born: 17 August 1953 Banjarmasin, Indonesia
- Died: 6 September 2026 (aged 73) Banjarmasin, Indonesia
- Party: PPP
- Education: Lambung Mangkurat University
- Occupation: Civil servant

Rudy Ariffin (17 August 1953 – 6 September 2026) was an Indonesian politician. A member of the United Development Party, he served as governor of South Kalimantan from 2005 to 2015.

Ariffin died in Banjarmasin on 6 September 2026, at the age of 73.
