= Theo Toemion =

Indonesian politician (1956–2023)

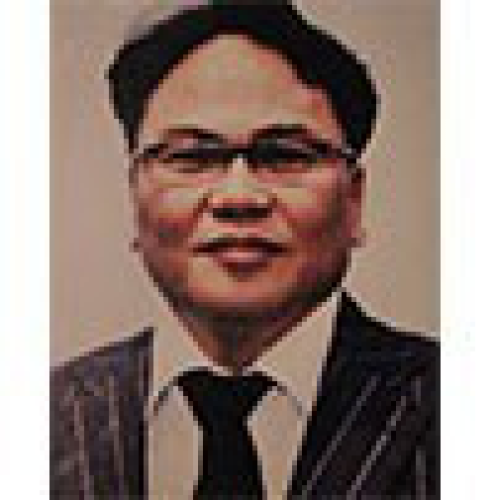
- Toemion in 2001

Member of the House of Representatives of Indonesia
- In office 7 June 1999 – 5 April 2004

Personal details
- Born: Theodorus Francisco Toemion; 21 September 1956
- Died: 15 September 2023 (aged 66)
- Party: PDI-P
- Occupation: Economist

Theodorus Francisco "Theo" Toemion (21 September 1956 – 15 September 2023) was an Indonesian economist and politician. A member of the Indonesian Democratic Party of Struggle, he served in the House of Representatives from 1999 to 2004.

Toemion died on 15 September 2023, at the age of 66.
