= PRIMA v. KPU =

Legal issues concerning Indonesian national elections in 2024

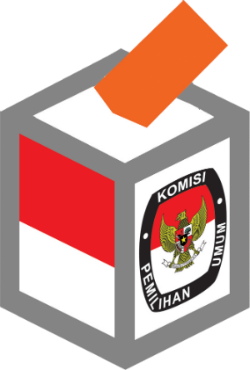
Logo of the elections held by KPU

Throughout March 2023, the Central Jakarta District Court and the General Election Supervisory Agency made separate rulings in favour of the Just and Prosperous People's Party (Indonesian: Partai Rakyat Adil Makmur, PRIMA) following the party's lawsuits against the General Elections Commission (KPU). The lawsuits were brought forth after PRIMA failed to qualify to participate in the 2024 Indonesian general election. One of the demands in PRIMA's court petitions was the postponement of the election, which was granted by the District Court.

The District Court's decision drew near-universal condemnation from Indonesia's political establishment, including President Joko Widodo, parliamentary leaders, and national politicians,. The KPU appealed the case to the higher court on 10 March after affirming that they will continue the election preparation process regardless of the court decision.

The Jakarta High Court, on 11 April 2023, decided to accept KPU's appeal and overruled South Jakarta District Court's decision to instruct the election delay.

== Background ==
The Just and Prosperous People's Party was formed through a merger of the People's Democratic Party (PRD) and numerous mass organizations. PRIMA's formation was announced on 27 May 2020, gained approval from the Ministry of Law and Human Rights on 29 September 2020, and officially founded on 1 June 2021.

Most of the party members and officials during its declaration were PRD cadres and its affiliates. The only exception is R Gautama Wiranegara, a retired major general of Indonesian Army and was a general secretary of National Counter Terrorism Agency.

== Court decisions ==
After failing to qualify to participate in the 2024 elections and exhausted all avenues within the electoral system to appeal their failure, PRIMA decided to file a lawsuit against the electoral commission, which they submitted to the Central Jakarta District Court 8 December 2022.

On their court petition, the party asked the District Court to declare them as the party aggrieved by the KPU, instruct the KPU to award the party Rp500 million as compensation for their failure to participate in the election, and postponement of the election. The party argued that the KPU was reckless in assessing submitted party documents as prerequisite for the election, which cost them the opportunity to participate in elections and appear in the ballot papers.

At the verdict reading on 2 March 2023, the Central Jakarta District Court unexpectedly ruled in favour to the party and fulfilled in entirety the party's petition. The judges ordered the KPU to suspend the remaining stages of the election and restart the election process from the early verification phase, which consequently postponed the election for at least two years, four months and seven days.

On 20 March 2023, the General Election Supervisory Agency (Bawaslu) also ruled in favour of PRIMA, although it did not order a postponement of the election and instead ordered KPU to grant PRIMA an additional ten 24-hour periods in order to amend its administrative documents. Rahmat Bagja, chairman of Bawaslu, stated that the body intended to not interfere with the election's preparations.

== Reactions ==
The verdict drew near-universal condemnation from Indonesia's political establishment, including most parties from both the government coalition and opposition camps. Only some individuals and parties, including PRIMA as the plaintiff, expressed their support to the decision.

According to an Executive Office of the President of the Republic of Indonesia deputy, President Joko Widodo is committed to abide by the constitution by ensuring the 2024 election proceeds according to the timetable, implicitly not welcoming the court decision. Meanwhile, Coordinating Minister for Political, Legal, and Security Affairs Mahfud MD said that the district court must "not create sensational decision".

=== Political parties ===
The main ruling party, Indonesian Democratic Party of Struggle (PDI-P), condemned the decision, which they believed "unusual", and asked the judges issuing the decision to be investigated.

The National Awakening Party, Indonesian Solidarity Party, NasDem Party, Democratic Party, and Prosperous Justice Party from both the governing coalition and opposition camps also voiced concern, primarily by denouncing the court decision as highly unusual. Besides issuing a condemnation, the Labour Party, who qualified for their very first election, also threatened to stage large-scale protest to oppose the decision.

Meanwhile, PRIMA commended the court decision, and party chairperson Agus Jabo Priyono said that the verdict proved that the KPU has committed major error in their verification process which cost the party opportunity to participate in 2024 elections despite fulfilling the criteria to do so. They also appealed all parties to respect the court decision. Few days later, PRIMA stated that they would withdraw their lawsuit if the party was qualified to participate on 2024 elections.

Moreover, Arief Poyuono, a politician from the Great Indonesia Movement Party from the governing coalition, welcomed the decision, as he believed Indonesia "still needs Jokowi". United Development Party politician Muhammad Romahurmuziy also stated that election postponement is "something legitimate in democracy". Berkarya Party also supported the decision.

=== Judiciary ===
Judicial Commission of Indonesia (KY) summoned the judges for investigation to their unusual decision on 3 March 2023. The judges, Tengku Oyong, H. Bakri, and Dominggus Silaban are in due to be presented themselves to the commission. Meanwhile, the Supreme Court of Indonesia stated that despite the irregularity of the decision, the judges cannot be wronged and asked the KPU to submit an appeal to the higher court instead.

KY recommend the suspension of the judges on 17 July 2023 and also requested the judges to be relieved from their judge duty for 2 years. Despite the recommendation, the Supreme Court, by its Overseer Body, which hold the law enforcement power over the judges, decided to punish the judges by transferred them to remote lower courts on 22 August 2023.

=== Others ===
Former minister Yusril Ihza Mahendra, former Constitutional Court Chief Judge Hamdan Zoelva, lecturer and election activist Titi Anggraeni, and university lecturer Feri Ansari all argued the decision both unlawful and unconstitutional, as the court have ruled beyond its jurisdiction, and suspected that the judges were incompetent. Political expert from Gadjah Mada University, Wawan Mas'udi said that the decision is highly irregular because the district court has no jurisdiction over election disputes.

Major Muslim organisation Muhammadiyah stated that the postponement violated the constitution, while preachers from Ahl as-Sunnah Students Volunteers of Nahdlatul Ulama (Anies) also voiced rejection.

== Aftermath ==
In response to the Bawaslu decision, KPU conducted a repeat verification of PRIMA on 1 April 2023 and declared that the party passed administrative verifications. However, on 19 April, the KPU deemed PRIMA not qualified to participate in 2024 elections after the party failed in its factual verification phase, where the KPU found the party's membership numbers below the required threshold. PRIMA proceeded to file a third lawsuit with Bawaslu, which was rejected.

Seeking to emulate PRIMA's success, Berkarya Party also launched a similar lawsuit demanding the postponement of the elections to the court.

=== Appeal ===
The Jakarta High Court, on 11 April 2023, decided to accept KPU's appeal and overruled South Jakarta District Court's decision to instruct the election delay. The high court also accepted the electoral commission's argument that the district court has no competency and jurisdiction over the case filed by PRIMA.
