= Achmad Mubarok =

Indonesian politician (1945–2023)

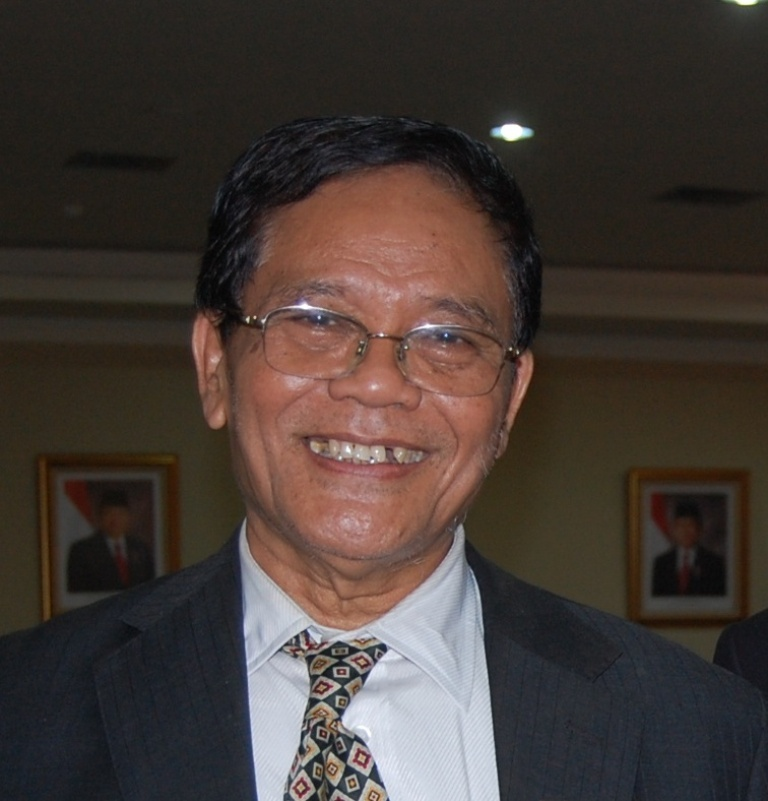
- Mubarok in 2014

Member of the People's Consultative Assembly
- In office 1 October 1999 – 1 October 2009

Personal details
- Born: 15 December 1945 Purwokerto, Dutch East Indies
- Died: 4 May 2023 (aged 77) Bekasi, Indonesia
- Party: Democratic Party
- Education: Syarif Hidayatullah State Islamic University Jakarta
- Occupation: Professor

Achmad Mubarok (15 December 1945 – 4 May 2023) was an Indonesian academic and politician. A member of the Democratic Party, he served in the People's Consultative Assembly from 1999 to 2009.

Mubarok died in Bekasi on 4 May 2023, at the age of 77.
