= Mochtar Pabottingi =

Indonesian researcher and writer (1945–2023)

- Born: 17 July 1945; Bulukumba, Celebes, Japanese-occupied Dutch East Indies
- Died: 4 June 2023 (aged 77); Jakarta, Indonesia
- Occupation: Author

Mochtar Pabottingi (17 July 1945 – 4 June 2023) was an Indonesian political science researcher, editor, essayist, novelist, and poet. He was a main researcher of national political development at the Indonesian Institute of Sciences (LIPI).

== Education and career ==
Pabottingi served as editor of Lighthouse and We Daily (both South Sulawesi editions), editor of Titian magazine, head of Indonesian Muslim Cultural Arts at Ujungpandang, and as LIPI researcher in Jakarta.

== Death ==
Pabottingi died from a heart attack on 4 June 2023, at the age of 77.

== Works ==
Pabottingi wrote poetry, essays, short stories, and articles. His writings were published in magazines and newspapers such as Pelopor Yogya, Base, Horison, Budaya Jaya, Prisma, and Tempo.

His novel Burung-burung Cakrawala (Birds of the Horizon) was published by Gramedia Pustaka Utama in 2013.

His published collections of poetry include:

- Dalam Rimba Bayang-Bayang (In the Forest of Shadows) (Kompas, 2003).
- Konsierto di Kyoto (Bentang Pustaka, 2015)

A number of his poems were selected by Linus Suryadi AG to be published in the poetry anthology Tonggak 3 (1987). His poetry was also translated into English in the poetry anthology On Foreign Shores: American Images in Indonesian Poetry (1990).

His works as an editor include:

- Islam: Between Vision, Tradition and Non-Muslim Hegemony (1986)
- Suara Waktu (Voice of Time; State power, people power, and nationalism in Indonesia) (Erlangga, 1999)
