= Ichsan Loulembah =

Indonesian politician (1966–2023)

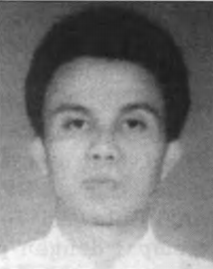
- Official Portrait, c. 2004

Member of the Regional Representative Council
- In office 1 October 2004 – 1 October 2009
- Constituency: Central Sulawesi
- Majority: 101,660 (9%)

Personal details
- Born: Ichsan Loulembah; 23 April 1966 Palu, Central Sulawesi, Indonesia
- Died: 30 July 2023 (aged 57) Jakarta, Indonesia
- Party: Non-partisan
- Education: Public Senior High School 57 Jakarta
- Occupation: Politician; journalist; editor

Ichsan Loulembah (23 April 1966 – 30 July 2023) was an Indonesian politician, journalist, and newspaper editor, who served as a member of the Regional Representative Council from 2004 until 2009. Born in Palu, Central Sulawesi, he only graduated from the Public Senior High School 57 Jakarta, before discontinuing his education. Instead, he became the Program Manager of Radio "Nebula FM " based in Palu. From 1990, he served as the editor of the National Suluh Weekly, also based in Palu.

From 2002 to 2004, he served as President Director of Ranah Multi Media Jakarta. In 2004, he ran for a seat in the upper Regional Representative Council (DPD) in the 2004 Indonesian legislative election. In the election, he placed third, with 101,660 votes, and received a seat, representing Central Sulawesi. As a senator, he viewed the DPD as a minimal response to the disparity between the central government and the outer regions. He left office in 2009, but he remained active in politics.

Loulembah died in Jakarta on 30 July 2023, at the age of 57.
