= Harunata =

Indonesian politician (1953–2023)

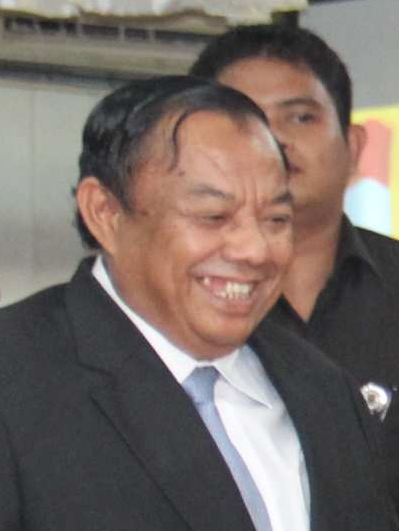
- Harunata in 2013

Regent of Lahat
- In office 1998–2008
- Governor: Rosihan Arsyad; Syahrial Oesman; Mahyuddin N. S.
- Deputy: Yulizar Dinoto; Zubir Ali
- Preceded by: Solichin Daud
- Succeeded by: Saifudin Aswari Rivai

Personal details
- Born: 28 July 1953 Lahat, South Sumatra, Indonesia
- Died: 20 January 2023 (aged 69) Bekasi, West Java, Indonesia
- Party: Democratic
- Spouse: Herlin (m. 1981)
- Children: 2
- Education: University of Birmingham (Dipl. DF); University of Jakarta (Drs.); Artha Bodhi Iswara Institute of Economic Science (MM)

Harunata (28 July 1953 – 20 January 2023) was an Indonesian bureaucrat and politician who served as the Regent of Lahat from 1998 until 2008. Previously, Harunata worked as a bureaucrat at the Department of Home Affairs. He resumed his career in the department after the end of his term as regent.

== Early life and education ==
Harunata was born on 28 July 1953 in Lahat. Harunata began his education at the 5th Lahat State High School from 1960 until 1966. Upon finishing his primary education, Harunata attended Saint Joseph school and graduated from there in 1972. He then studied at the University of Birmingham and obtained a diploma in development finance in 1975.

Harunata continued to pursue education during his career as bureaucrat and politician. He studied at the faculty of governance and administration in the Jakarta University and graduated in 1989. During his tenure as regent, Harunata undertook further studies at the Artha Bodhi Iswara Institute of Economic Science in Surabaya and at the National Resilience Institute, which he completed in 2002.

== Career ==
Harunata returned to Indonesia after his graduation from the University of Birmingham. He began his career as a staff in the Department of Home Affairs. Three years later, in 1978 Harunata was appointed the head of the provincial taxation section in the department. He would hold this position for almost two decades until 1996, when he was finally promoted to become the head of the regional taxation sub-directorate in the ministry. During this period, Harunata was frequently sent abroad to study taxation and administration.

In October 1998, the Lahat local council held an election for the region's regent. Harunata, who was nominated for the election, had to face the incumbent regent Solichin Daud. Harunata eventually won the election with 25 out of 44 votes. He was installed shortly afterwards. After his first term ended in 2003, he was reelected for a second term and served until 2008.

Under his leadership, the region suffered two consecutive major floods. The first one, which occurred in February 2004, caused the destruction of several houses. Harunata instructed the relocation of residences within the flood area to a safer region. The second one occurred in January 2007 and caused the destruction of the Sumatra Central Highway and several connecting bridges in the region. Several hours after the incident, Harunata conducted an inspection of the damages caused by the flood and the landslide.

At the end of his term, Harunata attempted to run as a candidate for the vice governor of South Sumatra from the Indonesian Democratic Party of Struggle. However, he failed to secure endorsement from the party and withdrew his candidacy.

Harunata resumed his career in the Department of Home Affairs after the end of his term. He was appointed by minister Gamawan Fauzi as his expert staff. In the middle of 2012, Harunata became the head of the department's education and training center. Under his leadership, the center began holding orientation courses for regional heads. In September 2012, Harunata arranged to send several regents in Indonesia to attend an executive education course at the Harvard Kennedy School. Due to his work in the department, Harunata was nominated as a member of the National Civil Service Commission.

== Later life ==
Harunata resided in Bekasi after his retirement from the government. In the 2018 South Sumatra gubernatorial election, Harunata publicly endorsed Herman Deru and became the coordinator of Deru's campaign team in Lahat. Later that year, Harunata announced his intentions to run as a candidate for the People's Representative Council in the 2019 Indonesian general election . He eventually secured a nomination from the Democratic Party, but failed to win a seat in the election.

== Personal life and death ==
Harunata was married to Herlin on 27 December 1981. The couple has two sons.

Harunata was a Muslim. He died at his residence in Bekasi on 20 January 2023, aged 69. He was buried at the San Diego Hills cemetery in Karawang a day after his death.
