= Handry Satriago =

Indonesian businessman (1969–2023)

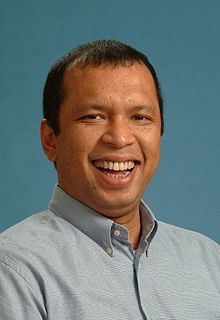

Personal details
- Born: Handry Satriago; 13 June 1969 Riau, Pekanbaru, Indonesia
- Died: 16 September 2023 (aged 54)
- Spouse: Dinar Sambodja
- Education: Universitas Indonesia; Institut Pertanian Bogor; Monash University
- Occupation: Businessman
- Known for: CEO of General Electric Indonesia

Handry Satriago (13 June 1969 – 16 September 2023) was an Indonesian businessman who was the CEO of General Electric Indonesia. He joined the company in 1997 as Business Development Manager. Prior to joining GE he worked for several local companies as head of business development.

Satriago was responsible for the development and the growth of GE's business in Indonesia. Over the 15 years of working at GE, Handry had been appointed to various positions of increasing responsibility such as GE International (Business Development Manager in Indonesia and Singapore); GE Lighting (General Manager Industrial Lighting for Indonesia and Brunei); GE Power Systems (Regional Black Belt Quality Leader Asia); GE Energy (Sales Director for Indonesia, Philippines, Vietnam region) before finally promoted as the CEO of GE Indonesia.

Satriago enjoyed reading, sports and travelling, and was described in the Indonesian media as "The First 'Made in Indonesia' GE Leader".

Born to a family of Minang nobility, Satriago was educated primarily in Indonesia. He was a member of the advisory boards of several educational institutions and in a Corporate University established by a state-owned enterprise. He was an active member (aside from being a founder and an ex-Champion) of GE Volunteer Indonesia Chapter, which had been honoured with several national and international awards for its contribution to society. Handry also served as a member of the Indonesia Committee of the US-ASEAN Business Council.

== Education ==
Handry Satriago received his bachelor's degree in 1993 from Bogor Agricultural Institute (IPB) majoring in Agroindustrial Technology, and obtained his master's degree in management (MM) from IPMI, Jakarta. He also earned dual MBA degrees from Monash University, Australia in 1997. Handry achieved his Ph.D. from the University of Indonesia in 2010, with a Doctorate in the field of Strategic Management.

His dissertation was entitled "The Influence of Leader's Followers to Performance: A Reverse Pygmalion Effect". In the dissertation, Handry explained how expectations from subordinates can influence the performance of their superiors, which is the opposite of the Pygmalion Effect whereas usually comes other way around (from superiors to subordinates).

In addition to his formal education, Handry also had the opportunity to receive informal executive education at acclaimed institutions such as Harvard Business School in Boston, USA in the field of Competitiveness of Microeconomics and training in management practices from GE Crotonville in New York, United States.

== Career ==
In 1997, he joined GE International as a Business Development Manager. In 1998, he moved to GE Lighting Indonesia and was assigned as the General Manager for Industrial Lighting and Systems. In mid-2001, he took the opportunity to become a Regional Black Belt in GE Power Systems Asia Pacific, and become Quality ACFC leader for GE Power Systems Asia in 2004. From 2005 until 2010, Handry led Power Generation business for GE Energy in Indonesia, Vietnam, Cambodia and Philippines. In July 2010, he was promoted as the CEO of GE Indonesia.

Handry was dedicated to education and volunteerism. He was a member of IPMI Business School Advisory Board and the Chairman of GE Volunteer Indonesia Chapter (GE Team Impact 2011 and Gerald Phillippe award winner). Handry also served as governor in America Chamber of Commerce (AmCham) Indonesia and a member of the Indonesian Committee on US-ASEAN Business Council. Handry was married to Dinar Sambodja, a former colleague at GE Lighting Indonesia, now a public notary in West Java. Handry recently resided in Jakarta.

== Death ==
Handry Satriago died on 16 September 2023, at the age of 54.
