= 2023 Plumpang oil depot fire =

2023 fire in Jakarta, Indonesia

- Still from a video showing one of the explosions
- Date: 3 March 2023
- Time: ~20:00 local time (WIB, UTC+07:00)
- Location: Jakarta, Indonesia; 6°8′4″S 106°53′48″E
- Cause: Oil fire
- Deaths: 33
- Injuries: 50

On 3 March 2023, a fire followed by an explosion occurred at a Pertamina oil depot in Plumpang, Koja, Jakarta. The fire spread to nearby residential areas, and at least thirty three people were killed.

== The depot ==
Pertamina's oil storage depot at Plumpang is often considered the most important fuel depot in Indonesia, having been established in 1974 and having a capacity of nearly 300 million liters of fuel. By itself, the depot handles around 20 percent of the country's fuel supply, primarily serving the Greater Jakarta area. It has previously experienced a fire in 2009, when one person was killed.

Residential areas were initially quite distant from the fuel depot, with a plot of land owned by Pertamina separating them. However, starting in 1998, locals had gradually encroached into the Pertamina plot, building houses illegally until thousands of residents were living in close proximity to the fuel depot. By the time of the fire, some houses were just one meter away from the depot's fencing, and the Pertamina plot had become a dense residential area. Pertamina intended for the minimum distance between the depot and residential areas to be 300 meters following the 2009 fire.

== Fire and explosion ==
Sometime around 8 PM local time (UTC+7), a fire broke out at the fuel depot. According to Pertamina's spokesperson, the fire had originated from the depot's receiving pipeline. It was suspected that a lightning strike had sparked the fire. Firefighters received a report of the fire at 20:11. The fire spread to a number of nearby houses, and local witnesses reported a loud explosion. Tens of local houses were burned, although by around 23:00 most of the residential fires had been put down.

Two firetrucks and ten firefighters were initially deployed, and this gradually increased to 52 firetrucks with 260 firefighters. By around 22:30, the fire had been localized and the blaze was put down by around midnight.

== Aftermath ==
Tens of burn victims were evacuated to nearby hospitals. By 23:00 local time, 17 people had been confirmed killed, including two children, with over fifty injured. This was later revised down to 13 killed as of the following day, with three children among the killed. A further four bodies were found in Saturday morning in the ruins, increasing the death toll to 17. The death toll was updated to 19 the following day, with another 3 teenagers still missing. Around 600 people were evacuated overnight to the North Jakarta mayoral office and nearby public buildings. By 24 March, as more victims in hospitals succumbed to injuries, the death toll had risen to 33.

Fueling operations resumed at the depot by 04:00 local time the following day. Pertamina utilized several other fuel depots in Greater Jakarta to make up for the disruption at Plumpang. State-owned enterprises minister Erick Thohir stated his intent to relocate the residents living close to the facility. President Joko Widodo visited an evacuee camp on 5 March, and floated the options of either relocating nearby residents or to move the Pertamina depot to a reclaimed island.
