= Hamka Haq =

Indonesian academic and politician (1952–2023)

- Born: 18 October 1952
- Died: 7 December 2023 (aged 71)

Hamka Haq (18 October 1952 – 7 December 2023) was an Indonesian academic and politician. He was an MP from 2014 to 2019. Haq died on 7 December 2023, at the age of 71.
