= Lily Yulianti Farid =

Indonesian writer and journalist (1971–2023)

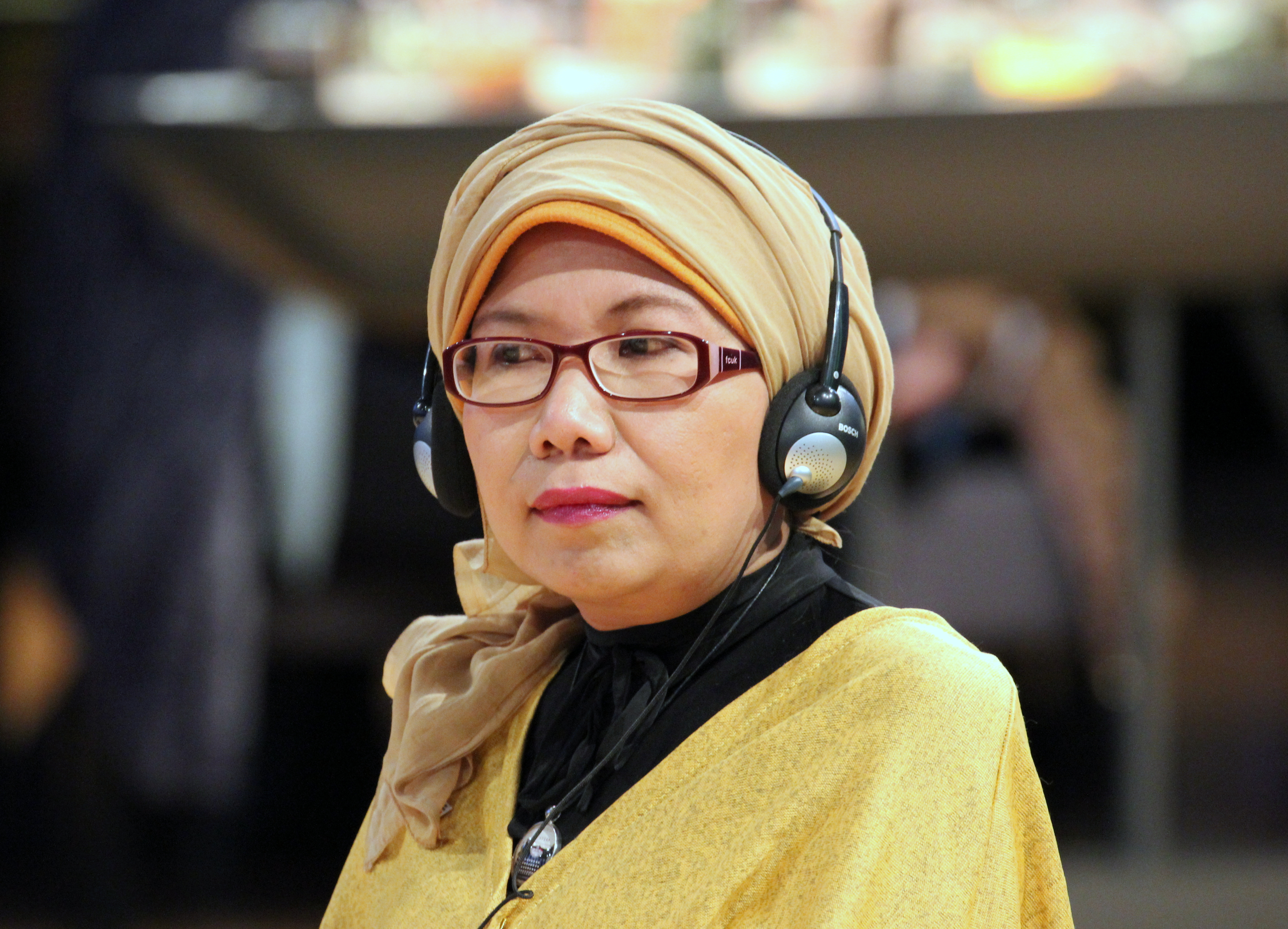
- Farid in 2015
- Born: Lily Yulianti; 1971; Makassar, South Sulawesi, Indonesia
- Died: 9 March 2023 (aged 51); Melbourne, Victoria, Australia
- Education: Hasanuddin University, University of Melbourne
- Occupations: Writer, scholar, cultural activist.
- Spouse: Farid Ma’ruf Ibrahim
- Children: Fawwaz Naufal Farid
- Writing career
- Language: Indonesian
- Period: 2007–2023
- Genre: short story
- Subjects: Gender, women, politics
- Notable work: Family Room
- Literary movement: 2000s

Lily Yulianti Farid (born Lily Yulianti; 1971 – 10 March 2023) was an Indonesian writer, researcher, educator and cultural activist.

== Early life and education ==
Farid was born and raised in Makassar, Indonesia. She later lived in Melbourne, Australia and worked at Monash Indigenous Studies Centre, Monash University as a post-doctoral research fellow for The Global Encounters and The First Nations Peoples : 1000 Years of Australian History. She joined Hasanuddin University, Makassar as an agricultural engineering student, where she began her literary career with the campus’ publication, "Identitas".

== Career ==
After graduation, she worked as a reporter of the "Kompas" daily from 1996 until 2000. In 2001, she went to the University of Melbourne for master's degree in "Gender and Development". In 2010 she registered for Ph.D. in "Gender and Media" from the same university and finished in 2015. While in Melbourne she continued her journalistic writing by working as producer of Radio Australia online during 2001–2004. From 2004 to 2009, Farid worked as a radio program specialist/producer of "Radio Japan NHK", Tokyo. During this period, in 2006 she also joined "Nytid News Magazine", Norway as a columnist.

Farid began her career in writing and journalism, and is now engaged in a number of independent projects also, namely: "Panyingkul!", which is Indonesia's first citizen journalism website launched on July 1, 2006, in Makassar to promote citizens' active participation in media; "Makkunrai Project", which is a gender awareness program through literature and stage performance launched in March 2008. Her first short stories compilation, Makkunrai, consisting of eleven stories based on the themes of gender, corruption, polygamy and politics from female perspective, was also released during the launch of Makkunrai Project, along with the active participation of seasoned writer and artist Luna Vidya. In September 2008, Maiasaura appeared as Farid's second collection of stories published by Panyingkul!. The stories are based on journals, news and documents of Women's NGOs, Human Rights Organizations’ Reports and various media outlets.

Farid later produced another short-story collection, entitled Family Room, which was translated into English, along with Makkunrai and Maiasaura by the Lontar Foundation, and selected for the "Modern Library of Indonesia" series. Her short story, "The Kitchen", was published in the January 2009 issue of the Chicago based journal, "Words without Borders". In 2009, she appeared as a featured speaker on a panel about "Global Journalism and Organizing" at the "Women, Action & The Media 2009 Conference" in Cambridge. In 2010, she also established a culture house, "Rumata Artspace" as a joint project with film director "Riri Riza". "Rumata", which is a Bugis-Makassar word for "our house" aims to serve as an independent forum for the development of arts and culture in Makassar and revival of South Sulawesi's literary tradition.

Farid was credited with the role of the initiator and director of the mid-June Makassar International Writers Festival (MIWF) in Makassar in 2011. Her strong belief in literary writing and reading tradition encouraged her to attend festivals of writers in several countries, including Singapore, Australia, France, the Netherlands and Hong Kong, as well as the Ubud Writers & Readers Festival in Bali, and at Utan Kayu, Jakarta.

== Death ==
Farid died in Melbourne, Australia on 10 March 2023. She had been living with ovarian cancer until her death.

== Publications ==
- Farid, Lily Yulianti (2007). Makassar di Panyingkul! (in Indonesian). Makassar: Panyingkul. ISBN 9789791644808. OCLC 271872121.
- Farid, Lily Yulianti (2008). Indonesia di Panyingkul (in Indonesian). Makassar: Panyingkul!. ISBN 978-979-16448-1-5. OCLC 312720672.
- Farid, Lily Yulianti (2008). Maiasaura (in Indonesian). Makassar: Panyingkul. ISBN 978-979-16448-1-5. OCLC 271738540.
- Farid, Lily Yulianti (2008). Makkunrai dan 10 kisah perempuan lainnya (in Indonesian). Makassar: Nala Cipta Litera. ISBN 978-602-8003-07-0. OCLC 271724563.
- Farid, Lily Yulianti (2009). Makassar dari jendela pete-pete : catatan seorang pengguna jalan (in Indonesian). Makassar: Panyingkul, Inninawa. ISBN 978-602-95231-0-2. OCLC 505131867.
- Farid, Lily Yulianti (2009). Semesta Galesong : senarai catatan seorang warga (in Indonesian). Makassar: Panyingkul, Inninawa. ISBN 978-979-98499-9-1. OCLC 505132309.
- Farid, Lily Yulianti (2010). Family room. Jakarta: Lontar. ISBN 978-979-8083-80-8. OCLC 689022058.
