= Abu Bakr Al-Habshi (b. 1964) =

Indonesian politician (born 1964)

Habib Abu Bakr Al-Habshi
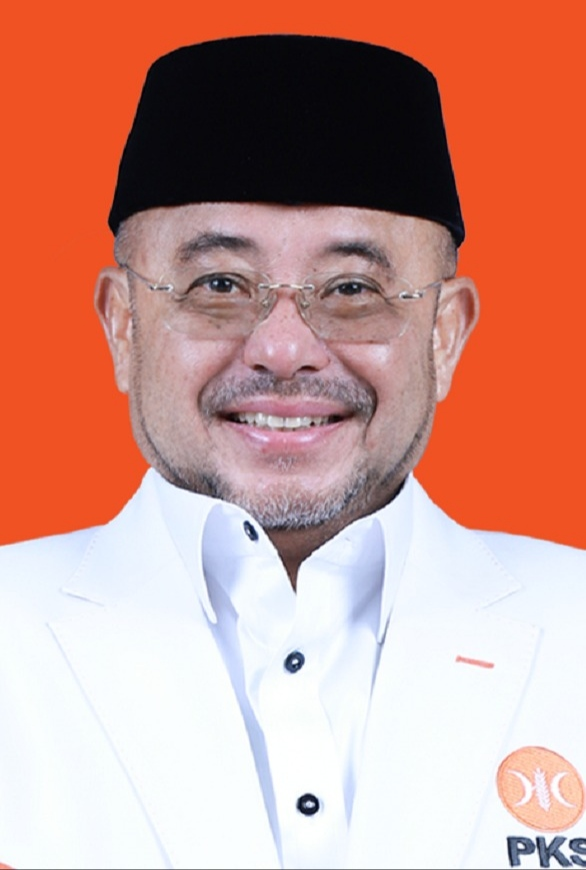

Secretary-General of the Prosperous Justice Party
- Incumbent
- Assumed office 5 October 2020
- Leader: Ahmad Syaikhu
- Preceded by: Mustafa Kamal

Member of the House of Representatives
- Incumbent
- Assumed office 1 October 2004
- Constituency: Kalimantan Selatan (2004-2009); Kalimantan Selatan I (2009-present)

Personal details
- Born: October 15, 1964 (age 61) Jakarta, Indonesia
- Party: Prosperous Justice Party
- Spouse: Fitrita
- Children: 4
- Education: STIE Bisnis Indonesia; King Saud University

Habib Abu Bakr Al-Habshi (Arabic: أبو بكر الحبشي, romanized: Abu Bakr Alhabshi, born 15 October 1964) is an Indonesian politician who fills the office of Secretary-General of the Prosperous Justice Party for the period 2020–2025. Al-Habshi is also a member of the House of Representatives of Indonesia, serving the terms 2004–2009, 2009–2014, 2014–2019, and 2019–2024.

== Biography ==
Al-Habshi was born in Jakarta and had elementary education in SD Negeri 03 Tanah Abang. He attended SMP Negeri 18 Jakarta and SMA Negeri 7 Jakarta for middle and high school, graduating in 1985. His is a member of the Ba 'Alawi sada tribe through his clan al-Habshi. He resides in Depok, West Java, and has three daughters and one son.

== Offices ==
- Director of Haji Ummul Qura Foundation
- Lieutenant Sec. Gen. of DPP PKS (1999–2004)
- Member of DPR-RI (2004–2019)
- Member of the Third Commission of the House of Representatives of Indonesia (Komisi III DPR-RI, 2014–2019)
