= Lambung Mangkurat University =

University in South Kalimantan, Indonesia

Coordinates: 3.2976°S 114.5860°E

- Universitas Lambung Mangkurat
- Motto: Waja Sampai Kaputing
- Type: Public
- Established: September 1, 1958
- Affiliations: ASAIHL
- Rector: Prof. Dr. Ahmad Alim Bachri S.E., M.Si
- Location: Banjarmasin and Banjarbaru, South Kalimantan, Indonesia
- Website: www.ulm.ac.id

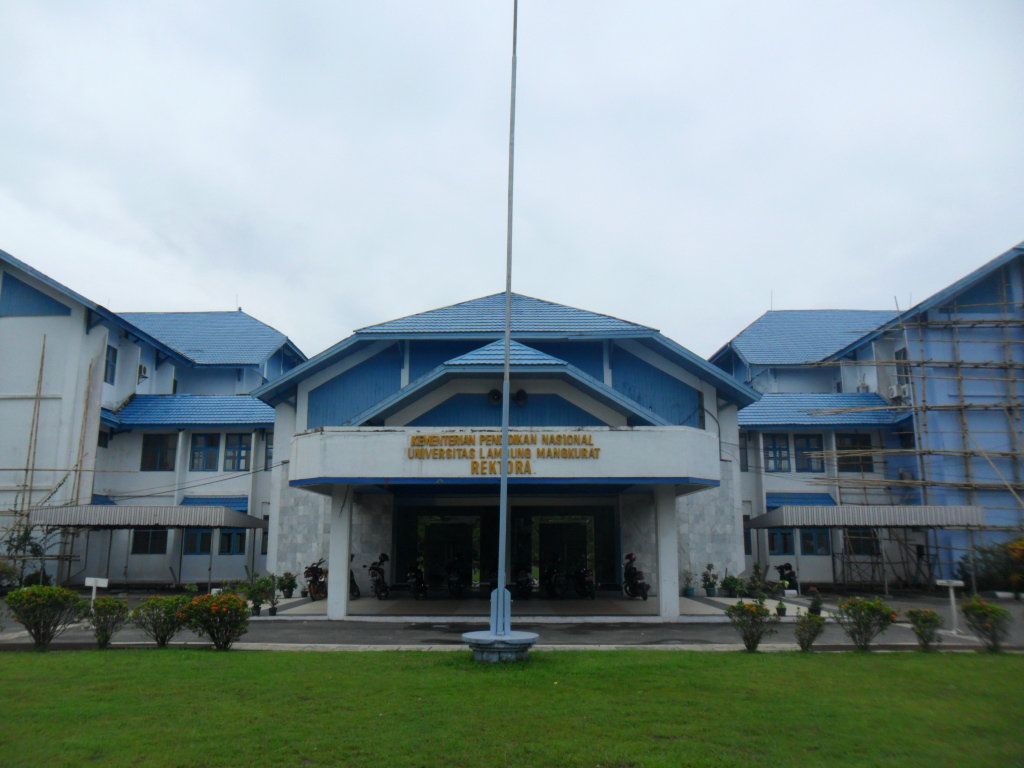
Rectorate building of Lambung Mangkurat University

Lambung Mangkurat University (Indonesian: Universitas Lambung Mangkurat) is a public university in Banjarmasin and Banjarbaru, South Kalimantan, Indonesia. It is established on September 1, 1958. Its current rector is Prof. Dr. Ahmad Alim Bachri. It is named after Lambung Mangkurat, the first Negara Dipa's patih (prime minister).

== Schools ==
The university has 10 faculties.

=== Banjarmasin campus ===
- Faculty of Education
- Faculty of Law
- Faculty of Economics
- Faculty of Social and Politics Sciences
- Faculty of Medicine (Departments of Medicine and Dentistry)
- Department of Architecture (under Faculty of Engineering)

=== Banjarbaru campus ===
- Faculty of Social and Political Sciences
- Faculty of Engineering (all departments include Architecture)
- Faculty of Agriculture
- Faculty of Forestry
- Faculty of Fishery
- Faculty of Medicine (Departments of Psychology, Public Health and Nursery)
- Faculty of Mathematics and Natural Sciences

Since 2011, the Department of Medicine and Dentistry (Faculty of Medicine) has been moved to a new campus in Banjarmasin, adjacent to Duta Mall.

== Academic fraud accusations ==
In 2024 it was revealed that 11 professors at the university had obtained their position partly by submission of papers in journals operating on a "pay-to-publish basis with minimal peer review and an acceptance rate of nearly 100 percent."

== See also ==
- List of forestry universities and colleges
