= Amin Syam =

Indonesian military officer and politician (1945–2023)

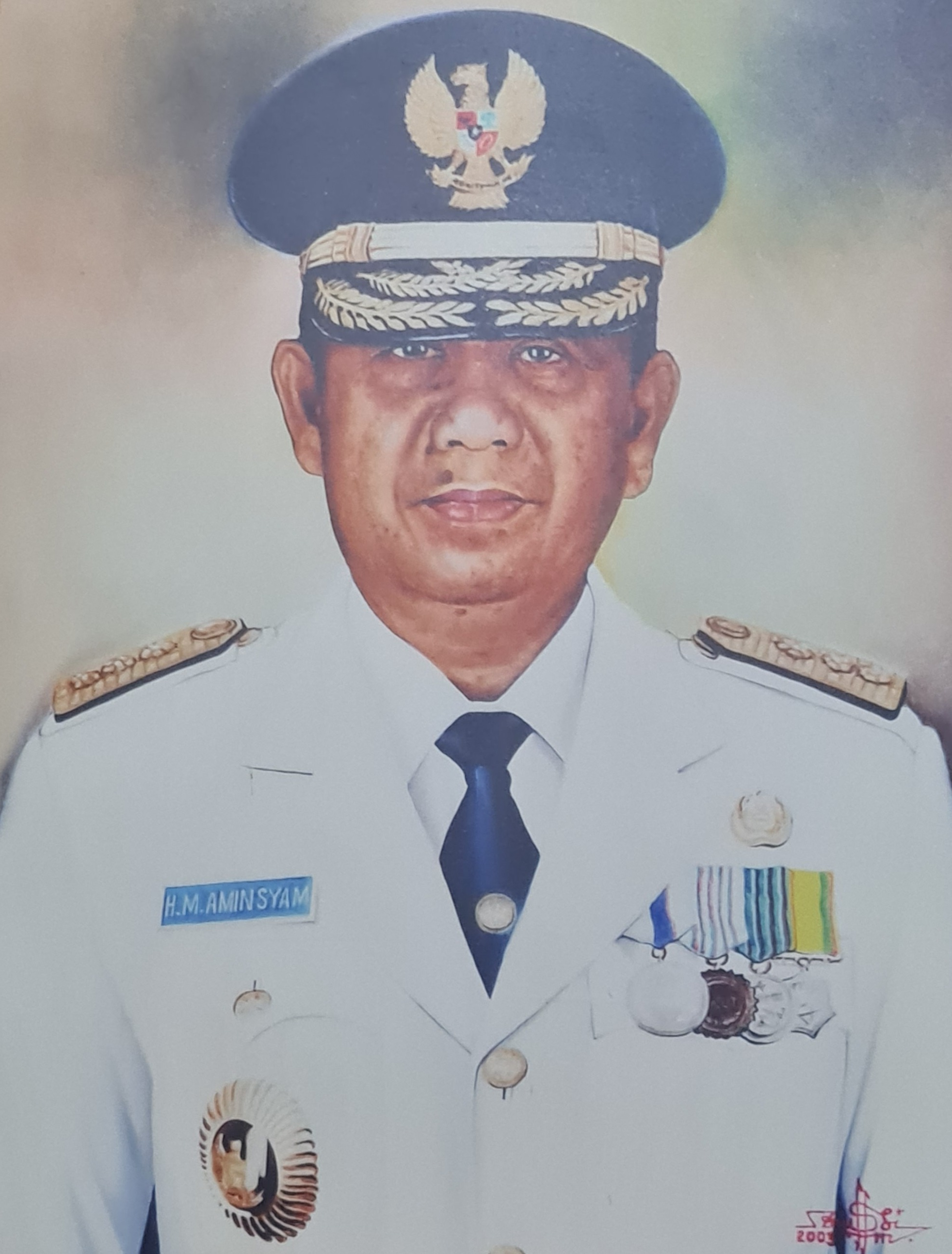

Governor of South Sulawesi
- In office 20 January 2003 – 19 January 2008
- Preceded by: Zainal Basri Palaguna
- Succeeded by: Tanribali Lamo (acting); Syahrul Yasin Limpo

Chairman of the Regional People's Representative Council of South Sulawesi Province
- In office October 1997 – 19 January 2003
- Preceded by: Alim Bachri
- Succeeded by: Eddy Baramuli

Personal details
- Born: 12 December 1945 Bone Regency, Dutch East Indies
- Died: 1 September 2023 (aged 77) Makassar, Indonesia
- Party: Golkar
- Education: Indonesian Military Academy
- Occupation: Military officer

Amin Syam (12 December 1945 – 1 September 2023) was an Indonesian military officer and politician. A member of Golkar, he served as governor of South Sulawesi from 2003 to 2008.

== Education and military career ==
Amin Syam was born in Bone, a locality in South Sulawesi, on 12 December 1945 as the son of Andi Syamsuddin Petta Wawo, a police officer, and Andi Bossa Daeng Matajang. Upon graduating from high school, he studied agriculture at the Hasanuddin University, but dropped out a few years later in favor of the Indonesian Military Academy. He graduated from the academy in 1965 and began his service in West Java as an instructor at the Artillery Education Center in Cimahi, West Java.

He was reassigned to the 6th Field Artillery Battalion in Makassar, South Sulawesi to fight against Islamic rebel groups in the region. After the rebellion toned down, he was sent to Takalar and became the commander of the military district. He was later transferred to the Wirabuana Regional Military Command—which covers the entire Sulawesi island—and held several important offices such as chief of information and deputy assistant for territorial affairs.

== Political career ==
Syam held various offices in the military and reached the rank of colonel. He was elected as the regent of Enrekang. During his tenure as regent, Syam established close relations with influential youth and religious figures in the region. He also launched family planning program for households in Enrekang.

Syam's term as regent ended in 1993 and he was elected as the chairman of Golkar in South Sulawesi. Shortly after becoming chairman, Syam was promoted to the rank of brigadier general. Under his leadership, Golkar obtained 91,6% of votes in the 1997 Indonesian legislative election, the highest number of votes compared to other provinces. He was then elected as the speaker of the Regional People's Representative Council of South Sulawesi and was appointed as a regional delegate to the People's Consultative Assembly. Syam's tenure as speaker of council was marred with protests against the Suharto regime, which he strongly opposed. He also had to face protests against the re-election of governor Zainal Basri Palaguna in early 1998.

Syam ran for the governorship of South Sulawesi in the 2003 indirect gubernatorial elections. He picked Syahrul Yasin Limpo, former regent of Gowa, as his running mate. The pair was nominated by the Golkar fraction inside the council and received approval from the home affairs department. Syam and Limpo won the election with 39 out of 75 votes. About than a year into his term, Syam was accused of being involved in the misuse of the South Sulawesi Regional Budget.

The West Sulawesi province, which was formed by splitting several regencies from South Sulawesi, was formed during Amin Syam's term. The South Sulawesi provincial government was required to assist the new province by giving eight trillion rupiahs, which Syam refused to provide. Syam brought the case to the court, requesting a judicial review on the legality of the West Sulawesi province. The constitutional court rejected the judicial review and obliged South Sulawesi to provide financial assistance to West Sulawesi.

== Death ==
Syam died of kidney failure in Makassar on 1 September 2023, at age 77. His body was interred at the Panaikang Heroes Cemetery the next day.
