= Muhammad Alim =

Indonesian judge (1945–2021)

- Alim in 2011

Justice on the Constitutional Court of Indonesia
- In office 26 June 2008 – 21 April 2015
- President: Susilo Bambang Yudhoyono

Personal details
- Born: 21 April 1945 Palopo, South Sulawesi, Sulawesi, Indonesia
- Died: 18 August 2021 (aged 76) Makassar, South Sulawesi, Sulawesi, Indonesia
- Citizenship: Indonesian
- Education: Hasanuddin University, Islamic University of Indonesia

Muhammad Alim (21 April 1945 ― 18 August 2021) was an Indonesian judge and a justice on the Constitutional Court of Indonesia. A career judge, Alim was appointed to the Constitutional Court by former Chief Justice of the Supreme Court of Indonesia Bagir Manan in 2008. Alim earned his undergraduate degree from Hasanuddin University in his home province of South Sulawesi, and his master's degree and PhD in constitutional law from the Islamic University of Indonesia in Yogyakarta.

Alim served on one of three panels set up by the Constitutional Court to investigate former presidential candidate Prabowo Subianto Djojohadikusumo's complaint in the Indonesian presidential election, 2014, serving on the panel alongside fellow justices Hamdan Zoelva (the panel chairman) and Wahiduddin Adams. Alim delivered the majority opinion of the court that the key claims of Subianto's claims were without merit, delivering a 4,300-page report after day-long hearings. He also delivered the court's opinion that the Government of Indonesia doesn't own customary forests, which are separate from state forests, and that the rights of indigenous peoples over customary forests must be protected.

Alim has also held dissenting opinions from the rest of the court. In 2009, he and two other justices held the minority opinion that cigarette advertisements should not be allowed on television channels or billboards due to the harm they can cause to children.
