= Anwar Usman =

6th Chief Justice of the Constitutional Court of Indonesia

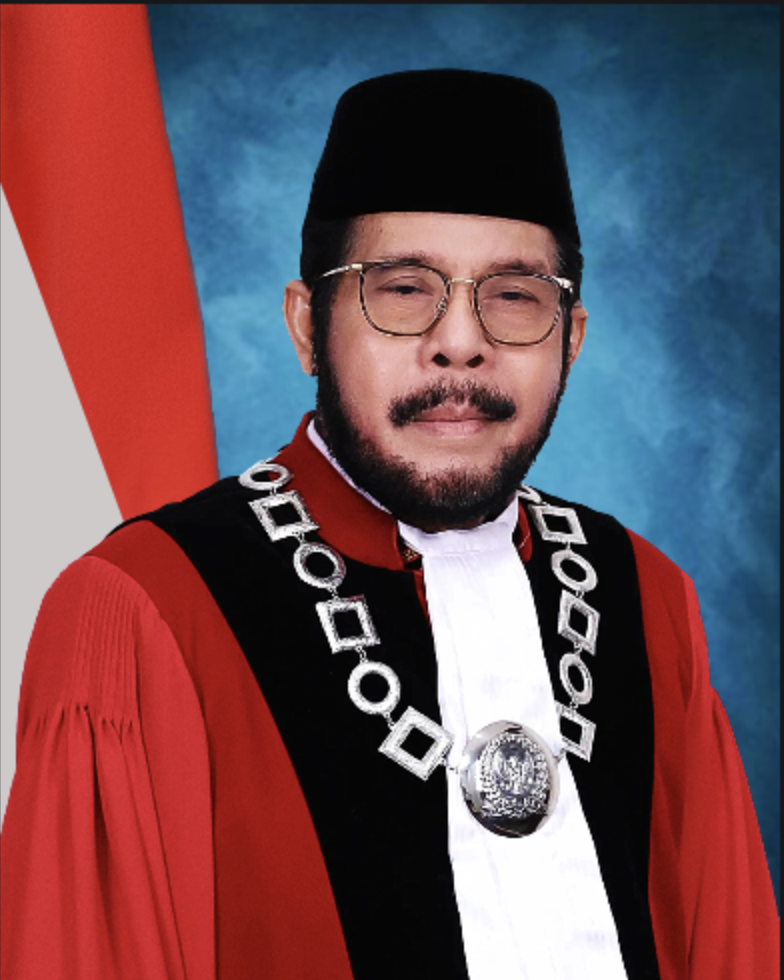
- Official portrait, 2018

6th Chief Justice of the Constitutional Court of Indonesia
- In office 2 April 2018 – 7 November 2023
- Appointed by: Joko Widodo
- Preceded by: Arief Hidayat
- Succeeded by: Suhartoyo

5th Deputy Chief of the Constitutional Court of Indonesia
- In office 14 January 2015 – 2 April 2018
- Appointed by: Joko Widodo
- Preceded by: Arief Hidayat
- Succeeded by: Aswanto

Personal details
- Born: 31 December 1956 (age 69) Bima, Indonesia
- Citizenship: Indonesian
- Spouse(s): Suhada (?–2021); Idayati (m. 26 May 2022)
- Education: Jakarta Islamic University (S.H.); Institute of Business Law and Management (M.H.); Gadjah Mada University (Dr)
- Occupation: Judge

Anwar Usman (born 31 December 1956) is an Indonesian jurist who served as the sixth Chief Justice of the Constitutional Court of Indonesia. He was elected to the position on 2 April 2018, replacing Arief Hidayat. Previously, he served as the fifth Deputy Chief Justice of the Constitutional Court.

Before his appointment as Deputy Chief Justice, Usman had served as a justice on the Constitutional Court for four years. He joined the court in April 2011, replacing Arsyad Sanusi. Prior to that, he was a high court judge in Jakarta and also held the position of Human Resources Manager at the Supreme Court of Indonesia.

== Early life, family, and education ==
=== Early life and family ===
Anwar Usman was born on 31 December 1956. His father was Usman A. Rahim, and his mother was Ramlah. He grew up in his home village of Rasabou, Bima, West Nusa Tenggara. He once mentioned that he had learned to live independently from a young age.

=== Education ===
He attended elementary school at SDN 03 Sila, Bima, and graduated in 1969. He then continued his education at the State Religious Teacher Education School (PGAN) for six years, completing his studies in 1975.

After graduating from PGAN in 1975, he moved to Jakarta and became an honorary teacher at SD Kalibarul, an elementary school. While working as a teacher, he continued his education and enrolled in the Faculty of Law at Jakarta Islamic University, graduating in 1984.

During his time as a student, he was active in theater under the guidance of Ismail Soebardjo. In 1980, he was invited to act in a film directed by Soebardjo, starring Nungki Kusumastuti, Frans Tumbuan, and Rini S. Bono. Although he played only a minor role, the film, Perempuan dalam Pasungan, went on to win several awards.

== Career ==
After earning his law degree in 1984, Anwar was appointed as a judge at the Bogor District Court in 1985.

=== Supreme Court ===
At the Supreme Court, he served as an Assistant to the Supreme Court Justices from 1997 to 2003. He was then appointed as Head of the Supreme Court Personnel Bureau, a position he held from 2003 to 2006. In 2005, while still serving as Head of the Personnel Bureau, he was also appointed as a judge at the Jakarta High Court.

=== Constitutional Court ===
Since the establishment of the Constitutional Court, he has closely followed its development under the leadership of Mahfud MD. Adapting to the environment of the Constitutional Court was not difficult for him.

"I adapted immediately. Moreover, the Chairman invited me to join a meeting shortly after I took the oath before the President. I also heard from friends at the Registrar's Office that hearings at the Constitutional Court sometimes last until midnight. Of course, I am ready for that," Anwar said.

As a judge, he carried out his duties by following the example of Prophet Muhammad. He often refers to a story about the Prophet:

"It is narrated in a hadith that the Prophet Muhammad was once visited by the leaders of the Quraysh, who asked for special treatment for the noble Quraysh children who had stolen. He wisely responded, 'By Allah, if my own daughter Fatimah stole, I would cut off her hand.' This means that law enforcement and justice must be applied to everyone without exception," he explained.

Anwar Usman was among the minority of judges who supported banning premarital sex and same-sex relations between consenting adults in the Constitutional Court's 2017 ruling.

=== Dismissal ===
Anwar Usman was removed from his position as Chief Justice of the Constitutional Court by the Constitutional Court's Honorary Council, chaired by Jimly Asshiddiqie, the Court's first Chief Justice. The Council found that Usman had committed a serious violation of the Constitutional Judge's Code of Ethics and Behavior, specifically breaching the principles of impartiality, integrity, competence, and appropriateness.

The controversy stemmed from his involvement in a ruling that allowed Gibran Rakabuming Raka, the mayor of Surakarta and the son of President Joko Widodo, to run for Vice President in the 2024 elections, despite Usman being the president's brother-in-law.

On 16 February 2024, the Jakarta State Administrative Court issued an interim decision to postpone the appointment of Usman’s replacement, Suhartoyo, while Usman's lawsuit challenging the appointment awaited a final ruling on 21 February.

== Personal life ==
He was married to Suhada until her death in February 2021. Together, they had three children. In May 2022, he married Idayati, the younger sister of the incumbent president, Joko Widodo.

== Filmography ==
Year	Film	Role	Notes
1980	Perempuan dalam Pasungan	Man at Cikini Market	Uncredited

Legal offices
Preceded by Arief Hidayat	Chief Justice of the Constitutional Court of Indonesia; 2018-2023	Succeeded by Suhartoyo
Preceded by Arief Hidayat	Deputy Chief Justice of the Constitutional Court of Indonesia; 2015-2018	Succeeded by Aswanto
