= I Dewa Gede Palguna =

Indonesian constitutional law academic

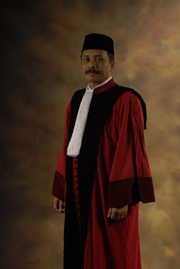

Justice on the Constitutional Court of Indonesia
- In office 16 August 2003 – 15 January 2008
- President: Susilo Bambang Yudhoyono
- Succeeded by: M. Akil Mochtar
- In office 7 January 2015 – 7 January 2020
- President: Joko Widodo
- Preceded by: Hamdan Zoelva
- Succeeded by: Daniel Yusmic P. Foekh

Personal details
- Born: 24 December 1961 (age 64) Bangli Regency, Bali, Indonesia
- Citizenship: Indonesian

I Dewa Gede Palguna is a constitutional law academic who served two terms as a justice of the Constitutional Court of Indonesia. He holds the record for having been the youngest ever justice of the Indonesian Constitutional Court. In February 2020, he was appointed to the ethics council of Indonesia's Child Protection Commission.

A Hindu from Bali, Palguna has said religious freedom is guaranteed by the Constitution and the state must protect any religion or belief regardless of whether they were formally recognized or not.

== First Constitutional Court term ==
Indonesia's Constitutional Court was established in 2001 but did not open its office until August 2003. Palguna served his first term in the court's first batch of justices between 2003 and 2008. The court has nine judges: three selected by the president, three selected by the Supreme Court and three selected by the House of Representatives (DPR). Palguna was among the three judges elected by DPR Commission II on legal affairs on 14 August 2003. The DPR factions had come up with a list of 12 candidates after two withdrew from the race. Most votes went to Jimly Asshiddiqie (nominated by Golkar Party and the Reform Faction), then to retired general and long-time legislator Achmad Roestandi (nominated by the United Development Party). Palguna, who was deputy secretary of the Indonesian Democratic Party of Struggle (PDI-P) faction in the People's Consultative Assembly (MPR), was the third DPR candidate elected. At the age of 41, he was the youngest ever justice of the Constitutional Court. He has kept that record after the minimum age for Constitutional Court justices was later raised to 47.

== Second Constitutional Court term ==
Palguna served his second term as a Constitutional Court justice from 2015 to 2020. This time, he was one of three appointees selected by President Joko Widodo. He replaced the outgoing justice Hamdan Zoelva. Palguna had been lecturing in law at Udayana University prior to his second term. Alongside his colleagues Patrialis Akbar and Manahan Sitompul, Palguna was investigated in relation to a graft scandal at the court in January 2017. Arief Hidayat, the Chief Justice, cleared Palguna and Sitompul of any wrongdoing but dismissed Akbar.

Upon completing his second term on 7 January 2020, Palguna welcomed his successor, Daniel Yusmic Pancastaki Foekh, by quoting the title of the Guns n' Roses song, Welcome to the Jungle. He advised Daniel to be strong and careful "because, if not, it is not impossible that a judge will become 'lost'."
