= Achmad Sodiki =

2nd Deputy Chief Justice of the Constitutional Court of Indonesia
- In office 19 August 2008 – 13 August 2013
- President: Susilo Bambang Yudhoyono
- Preceded by: Mohammad Laica Marzuki
- Succeeded by: Hamdan Zoelva

Personal details
- Citizenship: Indonesian

Achmad Sodiki was the second Deputy Chief Justice of the Constitutional Court of Indonesia. He is also a professor of law at University of Brawijaya, specializing in agrarian law.

At the end of Sodiki's term on the Constitutional Court of Indonesia, former President Susilo Bambang Yudhoyono attempted to replace him with Patrialis Akbar, though the Jakarta State Administrative Court blocked the appointment.

Legal offices
Preceded by Mohammad Laica Marzuki	Deputy Chief Justice of the Constitutional Court of Indonesia; 2008-2013	Succeeded by Hamdan Zoelva
