= Arief Hidayat =

5th Chief Justice of the Constitutional Court of Indonesia

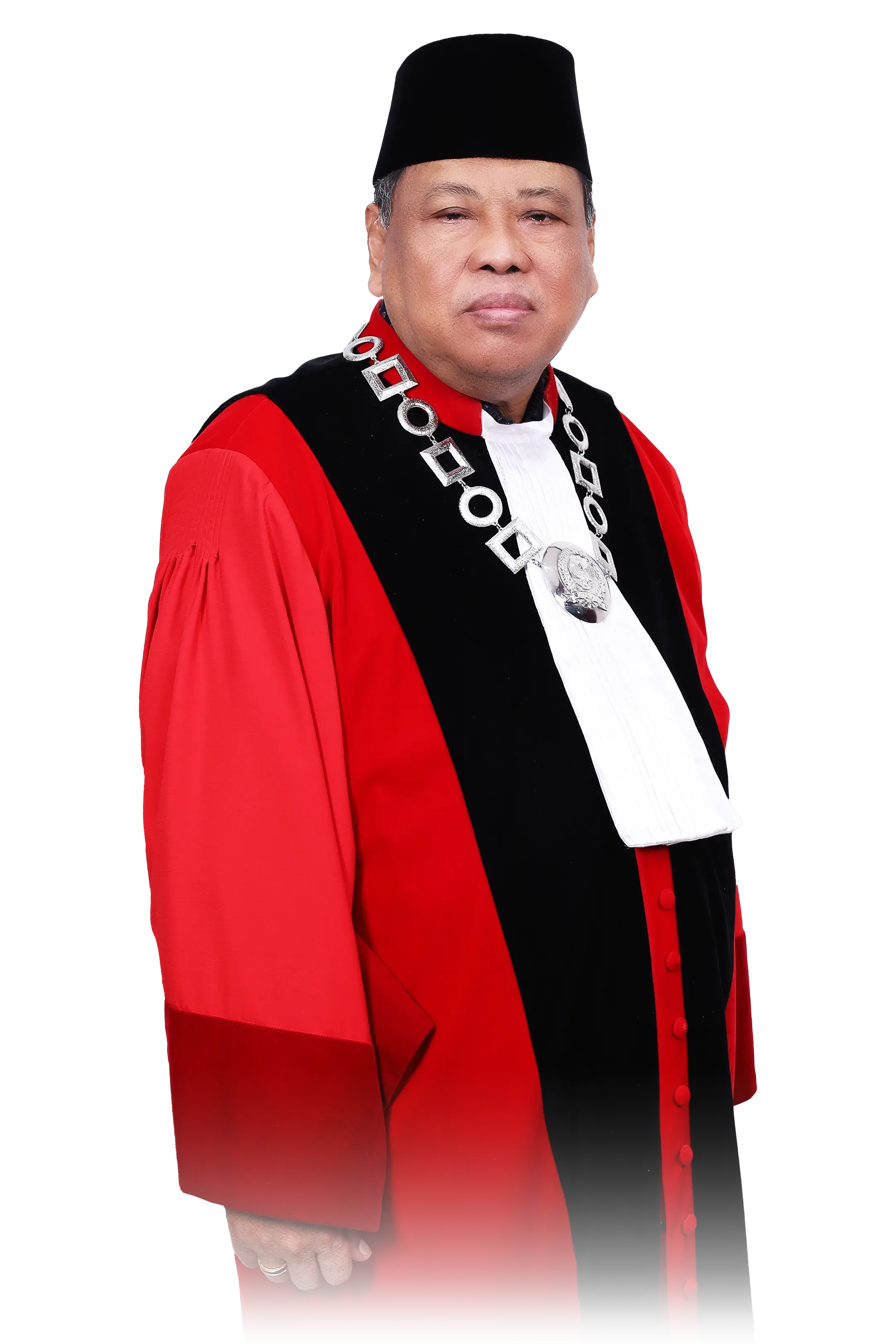

5th Chief Justice of the Constitutional Court of Indonesia
- In office 14 January 2015 – 2 April 2018
- Appointed by: Joko Widodo
- Preceded by: Hamdan Zoelva
- Succeeded by: Anwar Usman

4th Deputy Chief Justice of the Constitutional Court of Indonesia
- In office 6 November 2013 – 14 January 2015
- Appointed by: Susilo Bambang Yudhoyono
- Preceded by: Hamdan Zoelva
- Succeeded by: Anwar Usman

Personal details
- Born: 3 February 1956 (age 70) Semarang, Central Java, Indonesia
- Education: Diponegoro University
- Profession: Justice

Arief Hidayat (born 3 February 1956) was the fifth Chief Justice of the Constitutional Court of Indonesia. Previously, he was a professor of law at his alma mater, Diponegoro University.

In January 2017, Hidayat led an investigation of his colleagues relating to a graft scandal on the court. Hidayat cleared the names of two of his fellow justices, I Dewa Gede Palguna and Manahan Sitompul, but discovered evidence that led to the dismissal of (former) fellow justice Patrialis Akbar.

In December 2017, he denied committing an ethics violation by lobbying the House of Representatives for an extension of his term in office. He admitted to meeting legislators at a Jakarta hotel but denied doing any lobbying. He came under criticism over alleged backroom deals regarding the House's inquiry into the Corruption Eradication Commission (KPK) under the 2014 Legislative Institutions Law (MD3), which was under review by the Constitutional Court. Academicians in February 2018 demanded he step down for alleged ethical violations. He was re-elected to serve a second and final term until 2023 but he was replaced by Anwar Usman as the Chief Justice of the Indonesian Constitutional Court in April 2018. Arief Hidayat was one of the minority constitutional judges who ruled in favor of outlawing pre-marital sex and criminalizing consensual same-sex relations in the country in 2017.

Legal offices
Preceded by Hamdan Zoelva	Deputy Chief Justice of the Constitutional Court of Indonesia; 2013-2015	Succeeded by Anwar Usman
Preceded by Hamdan Zoelva	Chief Justice of the Constitutional Court of Indonesia; 2015-present	Succeeded by Incumbent
