= Deputy Chief Justice of Indonesia =

Chief Justice of Indonesia may refer to:

- Deputy Chief Justice of the Supreme Court Indonesia
- Deputy Chief Justice of the Constitutional Court of Indonesia
