= Aswanto =

Indonesian judge

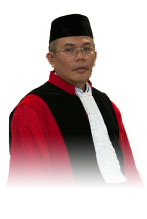

6th Deputy Chief Justice of the Constitutional Court of Indonesia
- In office 2 April 2018 – 23 November 2022
- Preceded by: Anwar Usman
- Succeeded by: Saldi Isra

Justice of the Constitutional Court of Indonesia
- In office 21 March 2014 – 23 November 2022
- President: Susilo Bambang Yudhoyono; Joko Widodo

Personal details
- Born: 17 July 1964 (age 62) Palopo, South Sulawesi, Indonesia
- Citizenship: Indonesian
- Education: Hasanuddin University; Gadjah Mada University; Airlangga University
- Occupation: Justice

Aswanto is an Indonesian Justice of the Constitutional Court of Indonesia, served until November 2022. He then replaced by Guntur Hamzah. He and Wahiduddin Adams were appointed by the People's Representative Council in March 2014. Aswanto graduated from Hasanuddin University, where he was serving on the Faculty of Law at the time of his appointment to the Constitutional Court, and also earned a Master's of Law from Gadjah Mada University and a doctorate in law from Airlangga University. Prior to his appointment to the court, he was active in judicial and electoral affairs of South Sulawesi, having served on the province's Justice and Human Rights Regional Office, General Election Supervisory Committee and as the ombudsmen of Makassar.

Aswanto was one of the minority judges who ruled in favor of outlawing premarital sex and criminalizing consensual same-sex acts in 2017. Aswanto also joined the rest of the Constitutional Court in opposition to total privatization of Indonesia's water resources, and in viewing challenges to Indonesia's tax amnesty law with suspicion. Aswanto also ruled against Omnibus Law concerning job creation.
