= Bahrain–Indonesia relations =

- Bahrain: Indonesia

Foreign relations between the Kingdom of Bahrain and the Republic of Indonesia were officially established in 1976. Bahrain sees Indonesia as an important market in ASEAN, while Indonesia sees Bahrain as one of the gate to enter Gulf Cooperation Council nations. Indonesia has an embassy in Manama since December 29, 2010, while Bahrain has an embassy in Jakarta. Both countries are the member of Organization of Islamic Cooperation.

== State visit ==
Indonesian President Abdurrahman Wahid paid an official state visit to Bahrain in June 2000.

== Trade ==
The trade volume between Bahrain and Indonesia has seen a significant increase, from about US$39 million in 2009 to more than US$140 million in 2011. Indonesian exports to Bahrain includes plywood and other wood products, charcoal, paper, garment, textile and furniture. While Indonesian imports from Bahrain includes iron ores, sodium sulphate, scrap metals such as iron, aluminum, copper, zinc, iron cables, and aluminum products.

== Cooperation ==
Both countries has agreed to foster cooperation in various sectors, include the bilateral inter-parliamentary cooperation, trade, industry, technology, and development of small and medium enterprises. Bahrain in particular are interested to ensure their food security and has shown the interest to invest in Indonesian food commodities.

== Migrant workers ==
Currently there are around 300 thousands Indonesians working in Bahrain.

== List of ambassadors ==
=== Indonesia to Bahrain ===
No.	Name	From	Until
1.	Chilman Arisman	October 2012	January 2017
