= Chief Justice of Indonesia =

Chief Justice of Indonesia may refer to:

- Chief Justice of the Supreme Court of Indonesia
- Chief Justice of the Constitutional Court of Indonesia
