= Mahfud MD =

2nd Chief Justice of the Constitutional Court of Indonesia

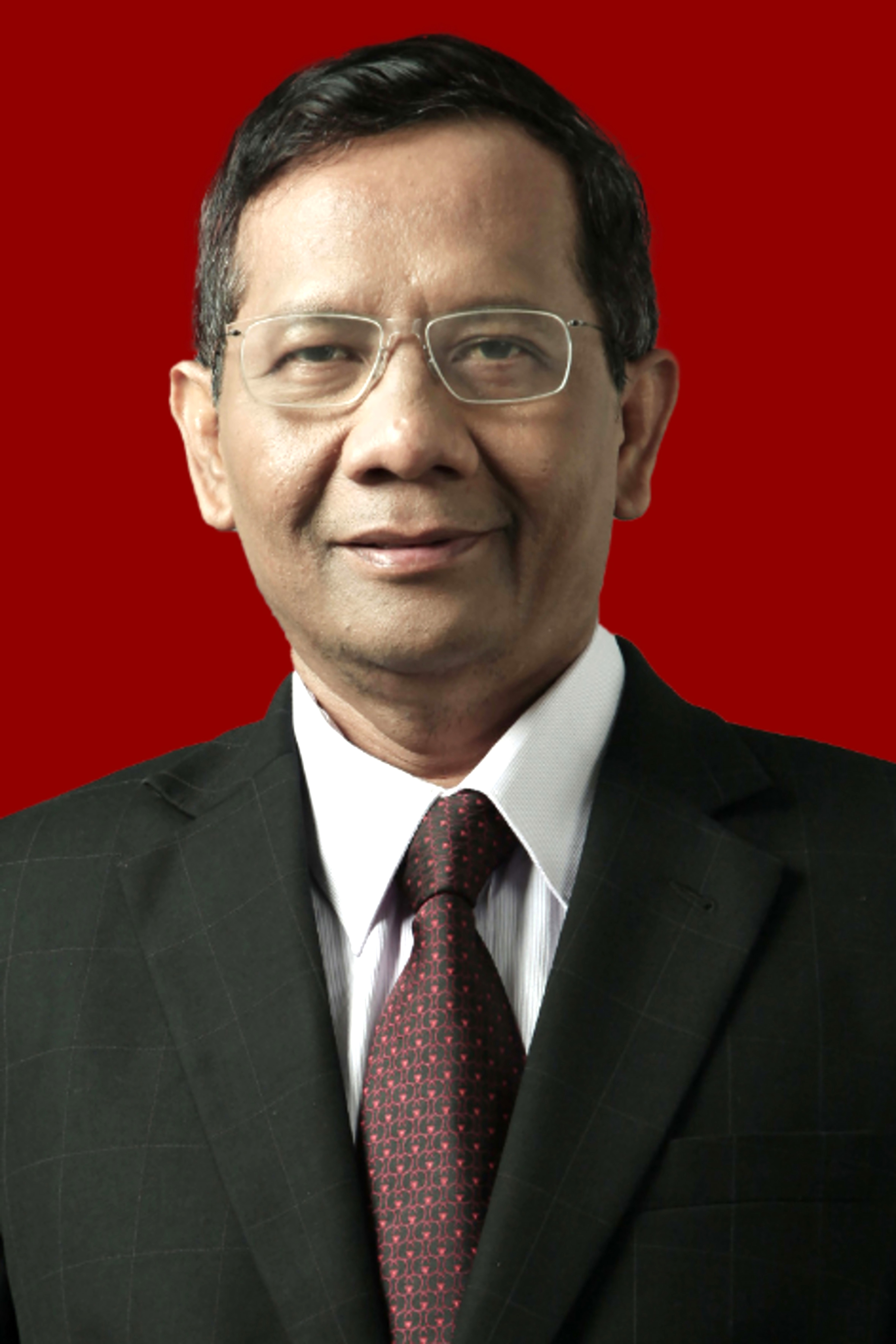
- Electoral portrait, 2023

14th Coordinating Minister for Political, Legal, and Security Affairs
- In office 23 October 2019 – 2 February 2024
- President: Joko Widodo
- Preceded by: Wiranto
- Succeeded by: Tito Karnavian (acting); Hadi Tjahjanto

2nd Chief Justice of the Constitutional Court
- In office 19 August 2008 – 3 April 2013
- Preceded by: Jimly Asshiddiqie
- Succeeded by: Akil Mochtar

24th Minister of Justice and Human Rights
- In office 20 July 2001 – 23 July 2001
- President: Abdurrahman Wahid
- Preceded by: Marsillam Simanjuntak
- Succeeded by: Yusril Ihza Mahendra

21st Minister of Defense
- In office 26 August 2000 – 20 July 2001
- President: Abdurrahman Wahid
- Preceded by: Juwono Sudarsono
- Succeeded by: Agum Gumelar

Roles of acting minister
- 2022: Acting Minister of State Apparatus Utilization and Bureaucratic Reform
- 2023: Acting Minister of Communication and Information Technology

Personal details
- Born: Mohammad Mahfud Madura; 13 May 1957 (age 69) Sampang Regency, East Java, Indonesia
- Party: Independent
- Other political affiliations: PKB (until 2008)
- Spouse: Zaizatun Nihayati (m. 1982)
- Children: 3
- Education: Islamic University of Indonesia (S.H.); Gajah Mada University (S.U., M.I.P., Dr.)
- Occupation: Politician; academician

Mohammad Mahfud Mahmodin (born 13 May 1957), commonly known as Mahfud MD, is an Indonesian politician, and legal academic who served as the 14th Coordinating Minister for Political, Legal, and Security Affairs of Indonesia from 2019 to 2024. He also previously served as the Chief Justice of the Constitutional Court of Indonesia, member of the People's Representative Council, Minister of Defense, and Minister of Law and Human Rights.

Born in Sampang, on 13 May 1957, he is of Madurese descent. He holds a master's degree in political science and a doctorate in constitutional law (1993) from Gadjah Mada University in Yogyakarta. He has taught constitutional law at the Faculty of Law at the Islamic University of Indonesia (UII) in Yogyakarta since 1984, though he has also taught in a number of other universities in Indonesia. In 2000, he was appointed Minister of Defense by president Abdurrahman Wahid, before being briefly appointed to the office of Minister of Law and Human Rights for three days. In 2004, he was elected to the People's Representative Council (DPR), as a member of the National Awakening Party.

In 2008, he was selected as a judge of the Constitutional Court. In the election for chief justice, he narrowly defeated the incumbent Jimly Asshiddiqie to become the second chief justice of the court. He resigned from the DPR upon taking the position, serving until his term ended in April 2013. The end of Mahfud's time as chief justice was subsequently followed by intention to run for the presidential seat in 2014, which was eventually won by former Jakarta governor, Joko Widodo.

In 2019, he was rumored to be Joko Widodo's running mate in 2019. As vice president Jusuf Kalla was not eligible to serve for another term, due to term limits, as Jusuf Kalla had already served another five-year term as vice-president under Susilo Bambang Yudhoyono from 2004 to 2009. Though he was passed up for the position, which instead went to Ma'ruf Amin. In 2019, following Joko Widodo's re-election, he was appointed the Coordinating Minister for Political, Legal, and Security Affairs.

Mahfud was a vice presidential candidate for 2024 Indonesian presidential election, together with Ganjar Pranowo who ran for president. They came in third place, being defeated by Prabowo Subianto and his vice presidential candidate Gibran Rakabuming Raka.

== Names and initials ==
=== Names ===
Mahfud MD was known by a number of different names throughout his life.

- Mahfud MD, is his most popular and well known name.
- Mohammad Mahfud MD, is his full name.
- Mohammad Mahfud, was his birth name.

=== Initials ===
The initials MD, behind his name is an abbreviation of his father's name, Mahmodin. The additional name began when he studied at the Religious Teacher Education (PGA), an educational institution equivalent to a junior high school, where in one class there were several students by the name of Mahfud. To distinguish him, the teacher asked all students named Mahfud to put their parents' names behind each of their names. With Mahfud MD using the initials of his father. Accidentally, the name was written in his diploma.

== Early life, family, and Education ==
=== Childhood and family ===
Mohammad Mahfud MD, originally born only as Mohammad Mahfud, was born on 13 May 1957, in a village in Omben District, Sampang, Madura. He is the fourth child of seven children. His father was Mahmodin (died 2006), an employee at the Omben District office, Sampang Regency. While his mother was a housewife named Siti Khadidjah (1929–2025). When Mahfud was two months old, his family moved to Pamekasan, where Mahfud would spend most of his childhood.

=== Education ===
==== Early education ====
When he was seven years old, he was sent to SD Negeri Waru Pamekasan, a public elementary school. While in the afternoon, he studied at the Madrasah Ibtida'iyyah, at the Al Mardhiyyah Islamic Boarding School. Mahfud was then sent to the Somber Lagah Islamic Boarding School in Tegangser Laok Village, now known as Pondok Pesantren al-Mardhiyyah, a salafi Islamic boarding school that is managed by Kyai Mardhiyyan. His parents enrolled him in the Pamekasan High School.

==== University ====
Mahfud was selected to continue his education to the Religious Teacher Education (PHIN), a leading vocational school belonging to the Ministry of Religion in Yogyakarta. In 1978, Mahfud graduated from PHIN. He then continued his education at the Faculty of Law, the Islamic University of Indonesia (UII). At the same time, he also studied Arabic Literature at the University of Gadjah Mada (UGM). At the Faculty of Law of the university, Mahfud majored in Constitutional Law. In fact, at the time his father had retire. To finance himself, Mahfud actively write in public newspapers such as the Kedaulatan Rakyat in order to get an honorarium. Mahfud won the UII Chancellor's scholarship, the Dharma Siswa Madura Foundation scholarship, and the Supersemar Foundation scholarship.

He graduated from the UII in 1983, becoming a lecturer. He later continued his postgraduate studies in political science, and graduating in 1989. He also graduated from Faculty of Law at UGM in 1993 with a law degree. His dissertation describes the causal relationship between political configuration and legal products in various periods, namely the period of Liberal Democracy, Guided Democracy, and the New Order.

=== Academic career ===
After graduating, he worked as a lecturer in a number of universities, including his alma mater UII, IAIN Sunan Kalijaga, and STIE Widya Wiwaha, Yogyakarta, and became a civil servant. He also held the academic position of Vice Chancellor of UII, from 1994 to 2000, Director/Professor of the Faculty of Law of UII, from 1996 to 2000, and Chancellor of the Kadiri Islamic University, from 2003 until 2006.

== Political career ==
=== Early political career ===
==== Cabinet minister ====
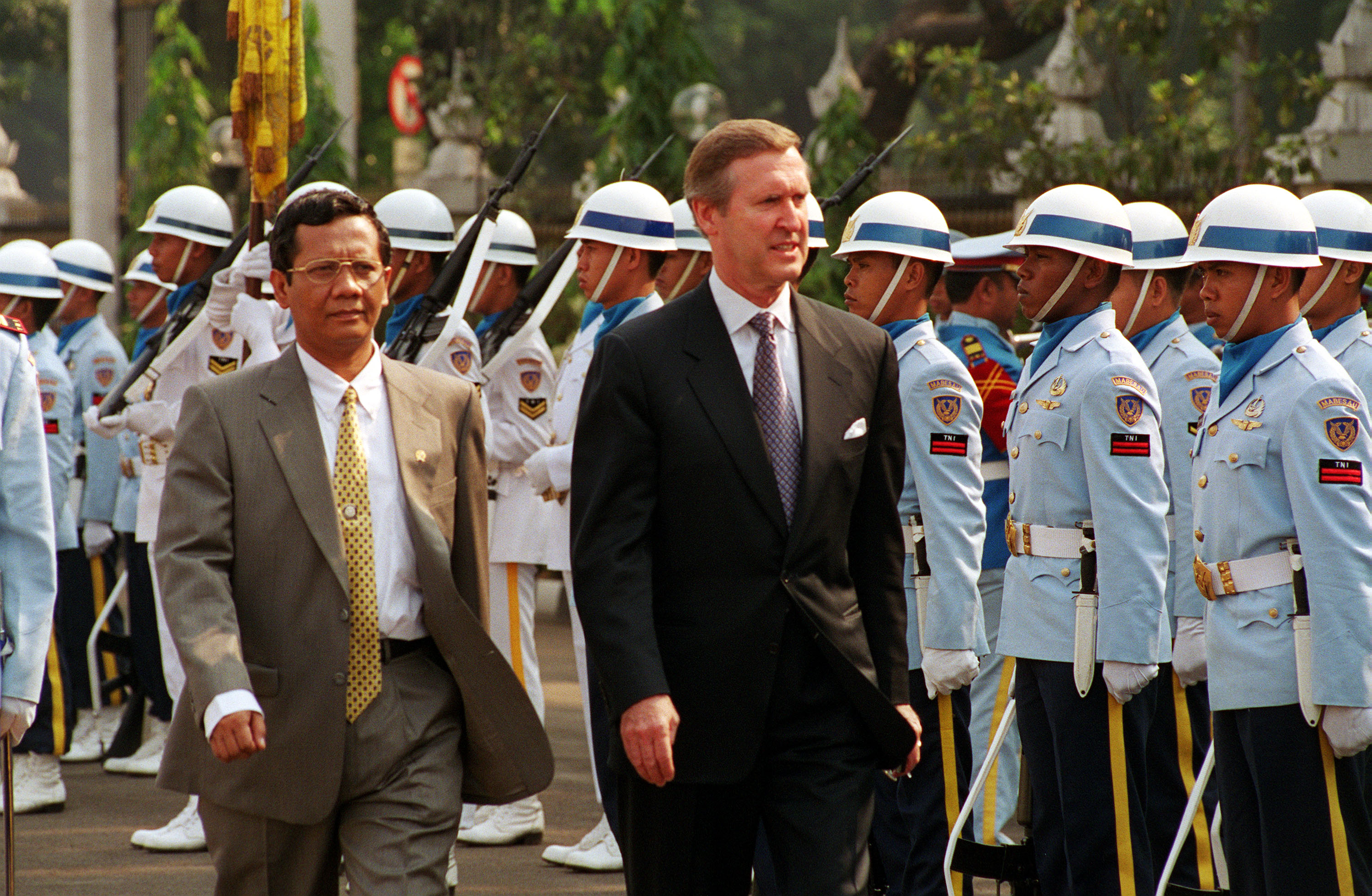
Minister of Defense Mahfud MD (left) escorts Secretary of Defense William S. Cohen (right) at the Defense Ministry in Jakarta, September 2000

Mahfud was appointed Minister of Defense by President Abdurrahman Wahid on 23 August 2000. The appointment of Mahfud as the Minister of Defense caused controversy, after being rumored that the appointment was disagreed by vice president Megawati Sukarnoputri, although Mahfud later admitted that he met Megawati in personal, and confirmed that she did not have any problems with his appointment. Following a cabinet reshuffle on 20 July 2001, Mahfud moved from the defense portfolio and was appointed Minister of Law and Human Rights. He held office briefly until Wahid's impeachment by the People's Consultative Assembly a few days later and the Mutual Assistance Cabinet's formation.

==== People's Representative Council ====
In 2004, Mahfud ran as a candidate for a seat in the People's Representative Council (DPR), as a member of the National Awakening Party. He ran in the East Java X electoral district, which includes the Lamongan and Gresik regencies. He was elected to the seat in the election. In the people's Representative Council, he served in the Third Commission of the People's Representative Council. In addition to the commission, Mahfud also served as Deputy Chairman of the Legislative Body of the DPR.

=== Constitutional Court Judge ===
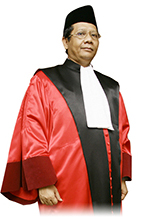
Mahfud MD portrait as a judge of the Constitutional Court

==== Appointment ====
In 2008, Mahfud was elected as a judge of the Constitutional Court, after pocketing 38 votes for members of the Third Commission in the open election. In the election for chief justice, he narrowly defeated the incumbent Jimly Asshiddiqie to become the second chief justice of the court. He resigned from parliament upon taking the position, serving until his term ended in April 2013.

==== Tenure ====
Mahfud attracted considerable publicity during his period at the court. The court is regarded as having made some progressive decisions and transformed the Constitutional Court being free of corruption during his time as chief justice but has also issued some surprising decisions such as an unexpected ruling in late 2012 that the existence of the upstream oil and gas regulatory agency BPMigas was unconstitutional.

=== 2014 presidential election ===
Towards the end of 2012 there was increased speculation about the possibility that Mahfud would become a candidate in the 2014 presidential elections in Indonesia. Several polls indicated high support for Mahfud amongst some groups of voters. In November 2012 he stood for, and was elected to, the position of chair of the Islamic Students Alumni Association (KAHMI), an influential Muslim organisation. His decision to successfully seek election as the chair of KAHMI, and being selected ahead of other well-known politicians such as Anas Urbaningrum, was seen as boosting his credibility as a potential presidential candidate.

He was the biggest candidate for vice president on 2019 partnering Joko Widodo, but the decision was cancelled in the last minute.

=== Coordinating Minister ===
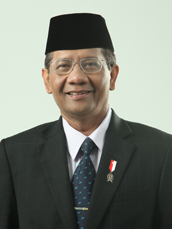
Official portrait as Coordinating Minister of Political, Legal and Security Affairs, 2022

In October 2019, Mahfud was appointed Coordinating Minister for Political, Legal and Security Affairs of Indonesia in Onward Indonesia Cabinet. He is the first civilian to hold the position, as his predecessors were all from Army or police. He was criticized during the return of Habib Rizieq, leader of the Islamic Defenders Front (FPI), from Saudi that he permitted a mass gathering to welcome Rizieq in airport amid pandemic which eventually leading to criminal prosecutions and deaths of 6 FPI members who were extrajudicially murdered by the police in December 2020.

He often comments on issues concerning human rights in Indonesia. His comments, for example about the rights of atheists and communists under Indonesian law caused a fuss in mid-2012 when he said people could only be punished for being atheists or communists if they behaved in a way that breached the national ideology of Pancasila. More recently, in September 2012 he was critical of a proposal from the National Counterterrorist Agency to certify Islamic clerics and scholars as a way of minimising the risk of radicalism.

During the 2023 Anti Rohingya Protest, he relocated 137 refugees to Indonesian Red Cross Society and Aceh Foundation Building, with the help from Jusuf Kalla.

==== Kanjuruhan Stadium disaster ====
On 3 October 2022, Mahmud appointed by Joko Widodo to led TGIPF (Tim Gabungan Independen Pencari Fakta; Joint Independent Fact Finding Team). The team was tasked to revealed facts of Kanjuruhan disaster that occurred on 1 October 2022. He was teamed with Zainudin Amali of Minister of Youth and Sport, Nur Rochmad, Rhenald Kasali of University of Indonesia academics, Sumaryanto of Yogyakarta State University rector, Akmal Marhali of Save Our Soccer coordinator, Anton Sanjoy of Kompas journalist, Nugroho Setiawan of AFC security officer, Doni Monardo of former BNPB chief, Suwarno of vice-chairman of KONI, Sri Handayani of former deputy regional police chief of West Borneo, Laode M. Syarif of former vice chief of KPK, and Kurniawan Dwi Yulianto of former Indonesian footballer. On 14 October, TGIPF assessed that there were 8 PSSI "sins" after the Kanjuruhan Tragedy and PSSI Chairman (Mochamad Iriawan) and executive committee members should resign.

=== 2024 presidential campaign ===
In October 2023, Mahfud was named as the running mate of Ganjar Pranowo, a presidential candidate put forward by the Indonesian Democratic Party of Struggle (PDI-P), Indonesia's current ruling party. Commenting on their partnership, Ganjar described Mahfud as a qualified intellectual, a courageous, and honest individual who consistently advocates for the rights of the people. Mahfud acknowledged that, before joining Ganjar in the 2024 presidential campaign, he had been offered the position of running mate for Anies Baswedan by the Prosperous Justice Party (PKS). However, he declined, fearing that accepting the offer might lead to accusations of dividing Anies coalition. Mahfud was convinced to join the PDI-P because it met the legal requirements to present their presidential-vice-presidential candidate.

Ganjar and Mahfud came in third place with 16% of the vote, being defeated by Prabowo Subianto and his running mate Gibran Rakabuming Raka. Though they initially disputed the election, after the Constitutional Court of Indonesia rejected their lawsuit both candidates accepted the results and congratulated Prabowo and Gibran.

== LGBTQ rights ==
In his role as Coordinating Minister of Political, Legal and Security Affairs, Mahfud has called on lawmakers to pass legislation that would curb the spread of LGBT activities. He has accused the Indonesian LGBT community of being a front for international organizations; however, he failed to tender evidence in favour of his allegations. He has also made a public statement that 'LGBT ideology' contradicts the religious values in Indonesia and should be resisted. Mahfud has broadly characterized homosexual conduct as being unconstitutional. His statement has also attracted condemnation from Nong Darol Mahmada, a member of the Liberal Islam Network.

On 12 May 2022, in response to public controversy related to Deddy Corbuzier hosting a gay couple on his talk show, Mahfud reiterated that because there was currently no law criminalizing homosexual sex (other than those that fell under pre-existing grounds of sexual offences, such as statutory rape), the KUHP (Criminal Code) should be swiftly amended by Parliament to outlaw non-heterosexual intimate relations. However, Indonesia's new Criminal Code, which was signed into law in late 2022, does not specifically criminalise same-sex intimate conducts and relations. Instead, it criminalises sex outside marriage under Article 411 and cohabitation under Article 412 of the Code, both articles are for opposite-sex couples only, although some has pointed doubts about the enforcement of such articles. In May 2023, in his change of views, Mahfud stated that the new criminal code does not ban LGBT nor criminalize same-sex conduct because same-sex conduct between adults are difficult to prove. The new criminal code only regulate rape done by adults with a minor, regardless if it was done by the same or different sex. "LGBT [orientations] is a natural thing, it is not a sin and cannot be prohibited. So what is a sin is the behavior. LGBT people were created by God. Therefore, it cannot be prohibited," he said.

== Personal life ==
Mahfud is married to Zaizatun Nihayati, a lawyer and teacher, who studied at the Faculty of Law, of the Islamic University of Indonesia, Yogyakarta. They first met on the campus of the Islamic University of Indonesia in 1978, when both were active in the Muslim Students' Association (HMI). They married on 2 October 1982, in Semboro, Jember. Together, they had three children: Mohammad Ikhwan Zein (born 1984), Vina Amalia (born 1989), and Royhan Akbar (born 1991).

He is a fan of English Premier League club Manchester United and Liga 1 club Madura United FC.

== Honours ==
=== National ===
- Indonesia:
  - Star of Mahaputera (2nd Class) (Indonesian: Bintang Mahaputera Adipradana) (10 August 2013)

=== Others ===
- At the first edition of Seputar Indonesia Awards by RCTI, in 2011, Mahfud MD was named as the newsmaker of the year, beating US President Barack Obama and World Bank managing director Sri Mulyani Indrawati.

Legal offices
| Preceded by Jimly Asshiddiqie | Chief Justice of the Constitutional Court of Indonesia; 2008–2012 | Succeeded by Akil Mochtar |
Political offices
| Preceded by Juwono Sudarsono | Minister of Defense; 2000–2001 | Succeeded by Agum Gumelar |
| Preceded by Marsillam Simanjuntak | Minister of Law and Human Rights; 2001 | Succeeded by Yusril Ihza Mahendra |
| Preceded by Wiranto | Coordinating Minister for Political, Legal and Security Affairs since 2019 | Incumbent |
| Preceded by Tito Karnavian | Acting Minister of Home Affairs; 2020 | Succeeded by Tito Karnavian |
| Preceded by Tjahjo Kumolo | Acting Minister of State Apparatus Utilization and Bureaucratic Reform; 2022 | Succeeded by Tito Karnavian (ad-interim) |
