= Saldi Isra =

Indonesian jurist and professor (born 1968)

Prof. Dr. Saldi Isra MPA
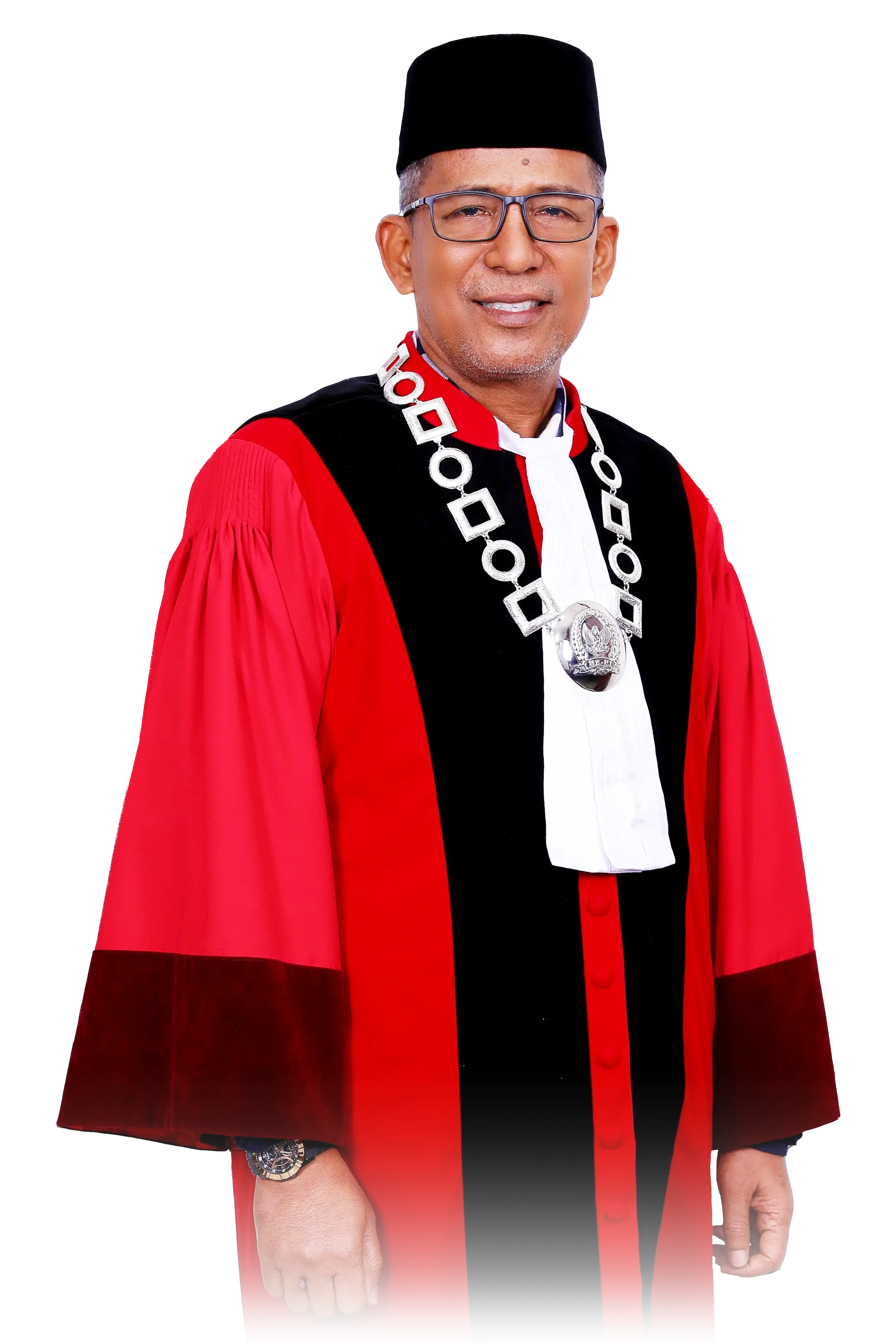
- Official portrait

7th Deputy Chief Justice of the Constitutional Court of Indonesia
- Incumbent
- Assumed office 15 March 2023
- Preceded by: Aswanto

Justice of the Constitutional Court of Indonesia
- Incumbent
- Assumed office 11 April 2017
- Appointed by: Joko Widodo
- Preceded by: Patrialis Akbar

Personal details
- Born: 20 August 1968 (age 57) Paninggahan, Solok Regency, West Sumatra, Indonesia
- Spouse: Leslie Annisa Taufik
- Education: Andalas University (bachelor's degree); Malaya University (Master's degree); Gajah Mada University (doctorate)
- Occupation: judge, jurist, professor of constitutional law
- Website: saldiisra.web.id (in Indonesian)

Saldi Isra (born 20 August 1968) is an Indonesian jurist and law professor. In April 2017, he became a Justice of the Indonesian Constitutional Court, one of the nation's two top courts. Prior to becoming Constitutional Court Justice, he was a professor of constitutional law at the Andalas University in his native West Sumatra. Throughout his academic career, he received awards in connection to his efforts against corruption in Indonesia.

== Biography ==
=== Early life and education ===
Saldi was born on 20 August 1968 in Paninggahan, Solok Regency, West Sumatra. His father Ismail was a farmer and his mother was Ratina (both deceased), and he was the sixth child of seven siblings. He failed Indonesia's national university entrance examinations in 1988 and 1989 before he passed the exam in 1990 and gained admission to the Faculty of Law at Andalas University, Padang, West Sumatra. While studying there he wrote about the need for a constitutional court in Indonesia (it was only established later in 2003), including it in his undergraduate thesis. He completed his undergraduate degree in March 1995 with summa cum laude honors.

=== Tenure in Andalas University and further education ===
Shortly after completing his graduation he began teaching at Andalas. While a staff there he pursued further studies, and received a master's degree from the University of Malaya in Malaysia (2001) and a doctor's degree from Gajah Mada University in Yogyakarta, Indonesia (2009). In 2010 he became a full professor of constitutional law.

In 2004, he was awarded the Bung Hatta Anti-Corruption Award for his role in uncovering a corruption scandal in West Sumatra's provincial legislature. In 2012 he was given the Megawati Soekarnoputri Award for his anti-corruption efforts. During one of the cabinet reshuffles of the Joko Widodo presidency, he was summoned to Jakarta in consideration for a cabinet appointment, but he rejected it, saying he preferred an academic career over a political one.

=== Appointment as Constitutional Court Justice ===
On 27 January 2017 the Constitutional Court of Indonesia dismissed one of its justices Patrialis Akbar after he was arrested and named a suspect in a graft case by the Corruption Eradication Commission. On 21 February, President Joko Widodo appointed a committee to select a replacement. The committee drew up a list of 45 candidates and then interviewed 12 shortlisted candidates. On 3 April, the committee recommended three candidates to the president, and Saldi was the first choice. A few days later, Widodo declared Saldi's selection, and on 11 April he was sworn in at the Merdeka Palace.

== Personal life ==
Saldi is married to Leslie Annisa Taufik and they have three children.
