= Manahan Sitompul =

Indonesian judge

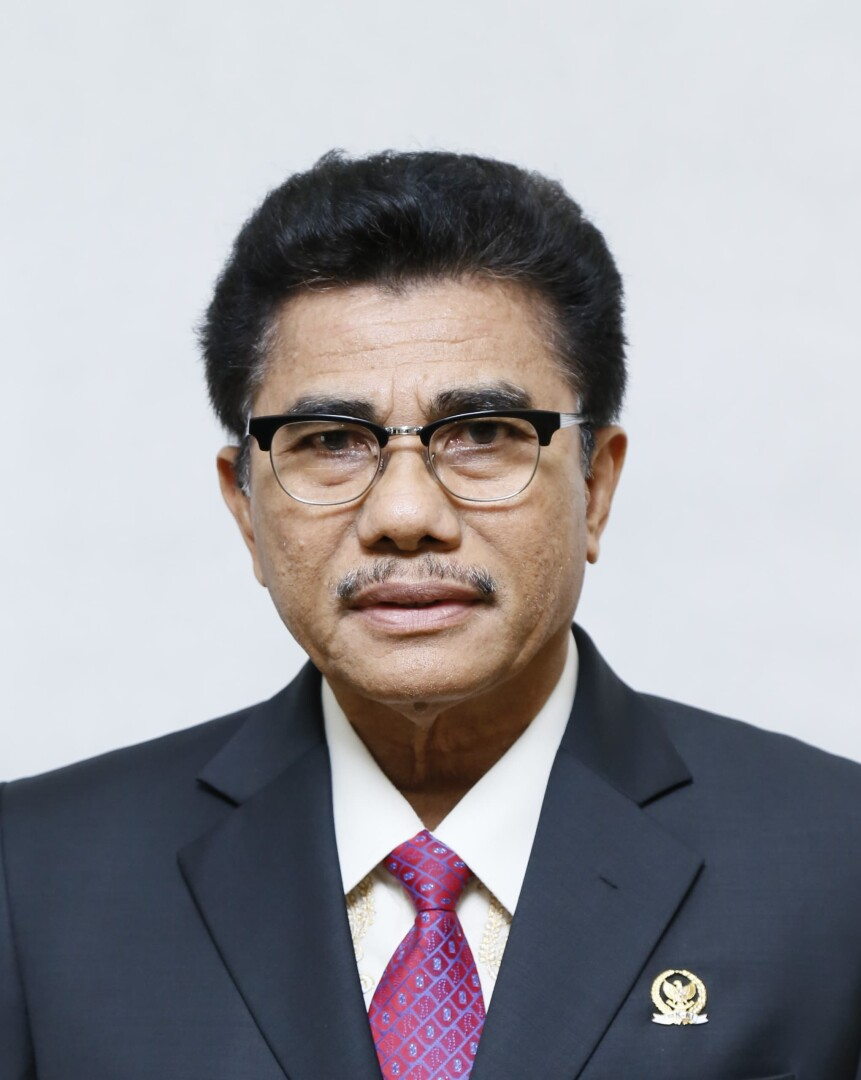

Justice on the Constitutional Court of Indonesia
- In office 28 April 2015 – 8 December 2023
- President: Joko Widodo

Personal details
- Born: 8 December 1953 (age 72) Tarutung, Indonesia
- Citizenship: Indonesian
- Education: State University of Medan

Manahan Sitompul (born 8 December 1953) is an Indonesian judge who formerly served as one of the justices of the Constitutional Court of Indonesia.

In January 2017, Sitompul was investigated alongside several other justices on the Constitutional Court in relation to a graft scandal. Chief Justice Arief Hidayat cleared Sitompul and colleague I Dewa Gede Palguna of any wrongdoing, but found evidence of bribery in an animal health case that led to the dismissal of their (former) colleague Patrialis Akbar.

On 8 December 2023, he retired from the Constitutional Court.
