= Suhartoyo =

7th Chief Justice of the Constitutional Court of Indonesia

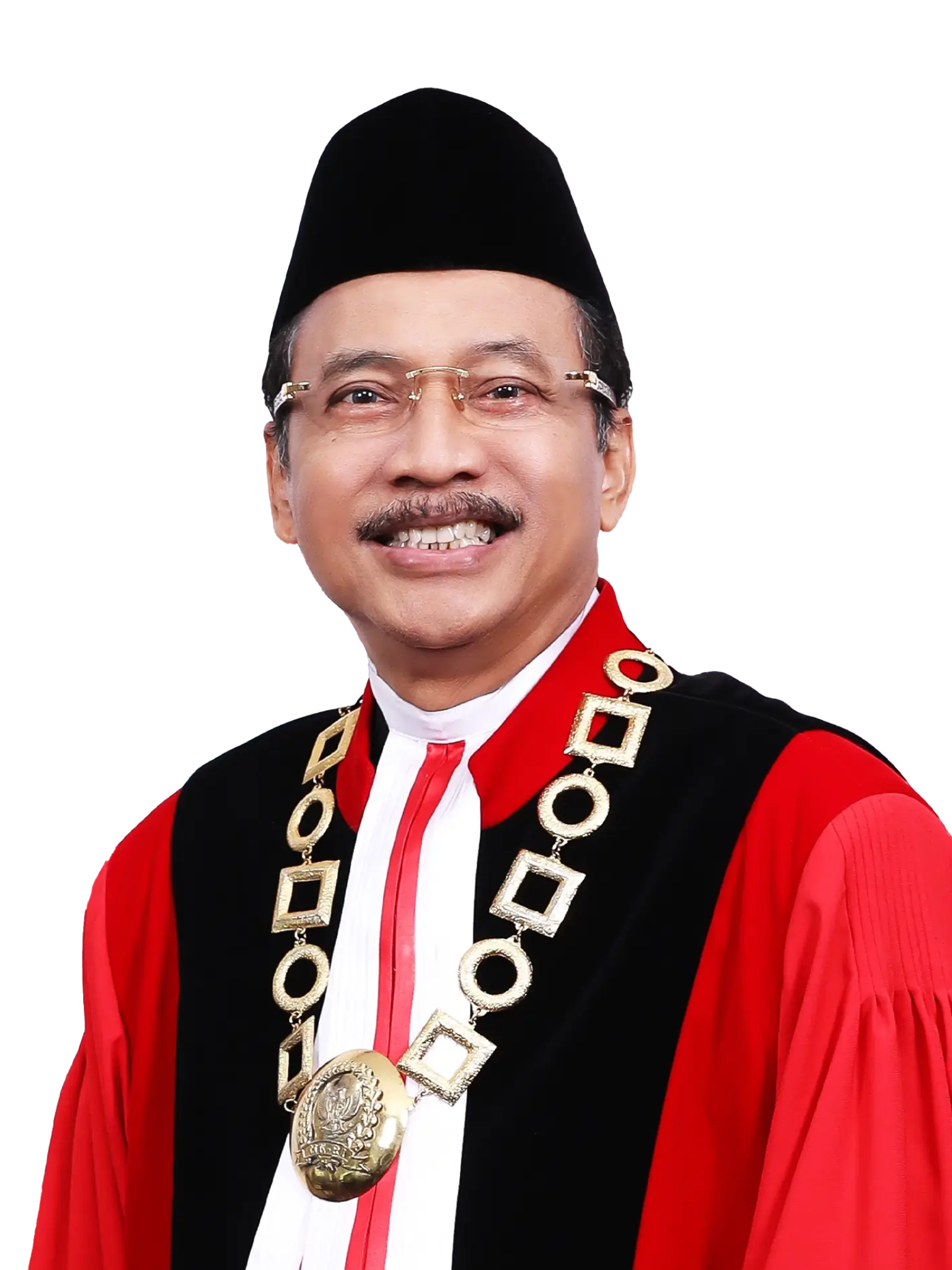
- Official portrait, 2023

7th Chief Justice of the Constitutional Court of Indonesia
- Incumbent
- Assumed office 13 November 2023
- President: Joko Widodo; Prabowo Subianto
- Preceded by: Anwar Usman

Justice of the Constitutional Court of Indonesia
- Incumbent
- Assumed office 7 January 2015
- President: Joko Widodo

Personal details
- Born: 15 October 1959 (age 66) Sleman, Yogyakarta, Indonesia
- Citizenship: Indonesian

Suhartoyo (born 15 October 1959) is currently the Chief Justice of the Constitutional Court of Indonesia, a position that he has held since November 2023. He ascended to the leadership of the Court following the demotion of Anwar Usman after the Court's Honorary Council found that he had committed ethical violations, which cleared the way for President Joko Widodo's eldest son to run for vice president in 2024.

Alongside I Dewa Gede Palguna, Suhartoyo was chosen by President Joko Widodo to replace outgoing Justice Ahmad Fadlil Sumadi in January 2015. A former judge from the Denpasar High Court, Suhartoyo's appointment caused controversy due to criticism from the Judicial Commission of Indonesia over his lenience on a Bank Indonesia liquidity scandal when he was serving on the South Jakarta District Court.

Suhartoyo joined the majority of the Court in ruling that parts of the 2010 Clemency Law were unconstitutional. Specifically, Suhartoyo explained the Court's view that the law's attempt to limit clemency appeals to within only one year of conviction conflicted with the Constitution of Indonesia and thus invalidated said parts of the law in question.
