= Wahiduddin Adams =

Indonesian Constitutional Court justice

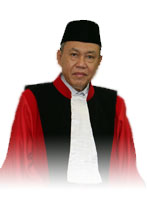

Justice of the Constitutional Court of Indonesia
- President: Susilo Bambang Yudhoyono; Joko Widodo
- Succeeded by: Arsul Sani
- In office 21 March 2014 – 18 January 2024

Personal details
- Born: 17 January 1954 (age 72) Palembang, South Sumatra, Indonesia
- Education: Syarif Hidayatullah State Islamic University Jakarta
- Occupation: Judge, Bureaucrat

Wahiduddin Adams is a former justice of the Constitutional Court of Indonesia. He and Aswanto were appointed to the court by the People's Representative Council in March 2014. Prior to serving on the bench, Adams was the Director General of Legislation at the Ministry of Law and Human Rights.

During his tenure as Director General, he often represented the Government of Indonesia in cases of judicial review. Adams has been notable for his position in support of gender-based affirmative action for membership in the People's Representative Council. However, he was also among the minority judges who supported the criminalization of pre-marital sex and homosexuality in the Constitutional Court's decision in 2017.
