= Amir Syamsuddin =

Indonesian politician (born 1941)

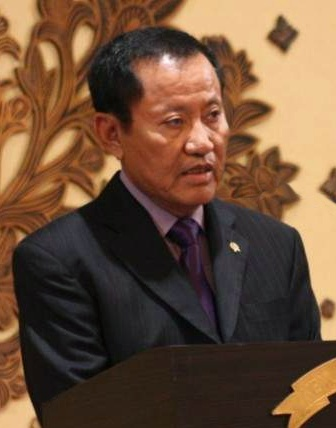
- Amir in 2011

29th Minister of Justice and Human Rights of Indonesia
- In office 19 October 2011 – 20 October 2014
- President: Susilo Bambang Yudhoyono
- Deputy: Denny Indrayana
- Preceded by: Patrialis Akbar
- Succeeded by: Yasonna Laoly

Personal details
- Born: Freddy Tan Toan Sin; 27 May 1941 (age 85) Makassar, Dutch East Indies
- Party: Democratic Party
- Spouse: Evy Amir Syamsuddin
- Education: University of Indonesia

Amir Syamsuddin (born 27 May 1941) is Indonesia's former Minister of Justice and Human Rights.

== Biography ==
Amir was born in Makassar, Dutch East Indies, on 27 May 1941 to Andi Bulaeng Dg Nipati. He graduated with a bachelor's degree in law from the University of Indonesia in 1983, earned a doctorate from the same university.

In 1983, Amir founded Amir Syamsuddin Law Offices and Partners. He later founded Acemark, an intellectual property firm.

In 2003, Amir represented former Golkar chairman and Speaker of the People's Representative Council Akbar Tanjung when he was charged with corruption. Tanjung was eventually acquitted by the Supreme Court of Indonesia. He also represented the magazine Tempo when it was sued by Probosutedjo. By 2011 Amir was serving as secretary of the Democratic Party's ethics council.

On 19 October 2011, Amir, then serving on the board of advisers to the Democratic Party, was selected as Minister of Justice and Human Rights of Indonesia, ceasing his legal practice. He replaced Patrialis Akbar amidst rumours of corruption in the justice system; Patrialis welcomed the appointment. Following his appointment, Amir stated that he intended to end the practice of giving convicted corruptors and terrorists cuts to their sentences.

== Reception ==
Teten Masduki of Transparency International Indonesia welcomed Amir's appointment, saying that he had "made a good first impression"; however, Masduki cautioned that Syamsuddin would have to follow through on his promises. The Jakarta Post reported the former Justice and Human Rights Minister Yusril Ihza Mahendra as "warning" that ending sentence cuts for corruptors and terrorists "might violate human rights and the principle of equal treatment for prisoners".

== Personal life ==
Amir has seven children. He has cited lawyer Suardi Tasrif as an inspiration towards becoming a lawyer.
