= 2023 Banda Aceh anti-Rohingya protest =

2023 protest by students in Indonesia

- Part of reactions to the Rohingya refugee crisis
- Location: Banda Aceh, Aceh, Indonesia
- Date: 27 December 2023
- Target: Rohingya refugees
- Attack type: Riot
- Perpetrators: Teuku Wariza Aris Munandar; Acehnese university students
- Motive: Racism; xenophobia (specifically anti-Rohingya sentiment); opposition to immigration

In December 2023, students from various universities in Aceh, Indonesia, protested and rioted against Rohingya refugees. The protests took place at the Balee Meuseuraya Hall in Banda Aceh.

== Background ==
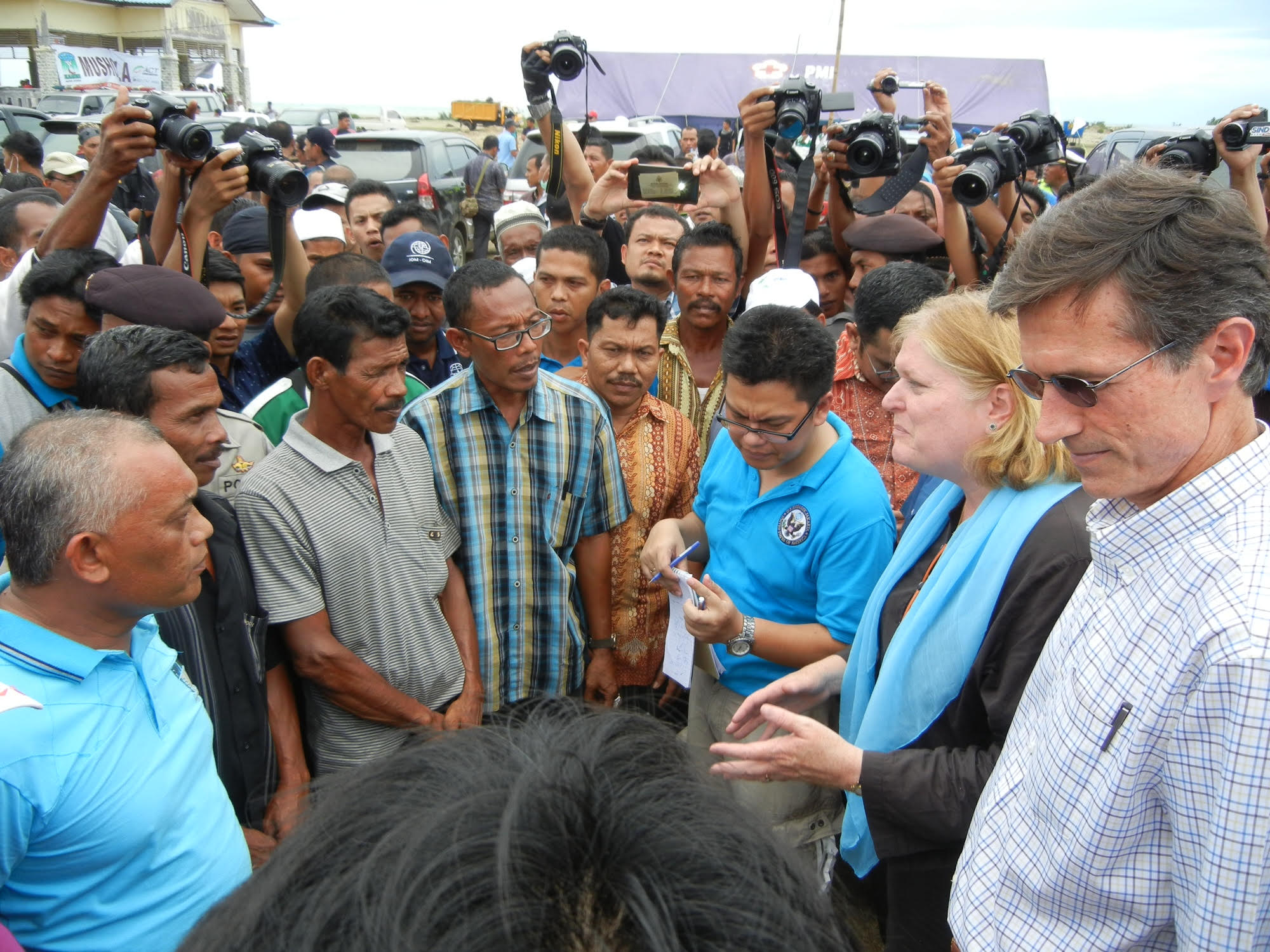
Anne C. Richard visiting Rohingya refugee camp in Aceh in 2015

The Rohingya are a stateless Muslim minority from Myanmar. They have been described by news outlets as one of the most persecuted group in the world.

The UN Human Rights chief Zeid Ra'ad al-Hussein called the actions of the Myanmar government an ethnic cleansing. They have denied this claim, saying that they're fighting Rohingya terrorists. To avoid violence, many Rohingya fled to other countries, such as Bangladesh, Malaysia, and Indonesia. According to the United Nations High Commissioner for Refugees (UNHCR), Rohingya refugees have arrived to Indonesia since 2015 with more than 1100 arriving in November and December 2023.

On 11 December, Gibran Rakabuming Raka commented that the arrival of Rohingya refugees is illegal and invited the government to focus on community welfare first. Similarly, on 26 December, Prabowo Subianto stated that the Indonesian government must pay attention to the interests of the people who still live under welfare rather than Rohingya refugees.

On 13 December, Retno Marsudi stated that the Rohingya refugees who landed in Aceh are the victims of human trafficking and people smuggling. In response to the influx of refugees, a misinformation campaign by fake United Nations accounts was created. These fake accounts spread hateful misinformation about Rohingya refugees.

On 27 December, the Indonesian Navy used a KRI Bontang (907) to repeatedly push out ships carrying Rohingya refugees on the grounds of human trafficking.

== Timeline ==
On 27 December 2023, hundreds of students from several universities in Aceh came to Balee Meuseraya Hall in Banda Aceh, representing Nusantara Student Executive Board. The Nusantara Student Executive Board included students from Al-Washliyah University, Abulyatama University, Bina Bangsa Getsempena University, and University of Muhammadiyah Aceh, among others.

The students demanded to meet with the Aceh Regional People's Representative Council and advocated for deporting Rohingya refugees. The students later ran to some of the refugees doing Salah. The students caused a commotion that caused several refugees to beg. They later were detained by officers to prevent further commotion.

Following this, the students ran back inside the building and started to kick the refugees' belongings, and threw mineral water bottles at them. The students also burned tyres and scuffled with the police, chanting to "Kick them out" and "Reject Rohingya in Aceh." The refugees were led out carrying their belongings in plastic sacks, and were taken to trucks with the help of police officers. They were moved to Aceh Regional Office of the Ministry of Law and Human Rights. After evicting the refugees, the students danced and celebrated in front of the regional office. This was recorded and uploaded on social media on 28 December.

== Investigation ==
The United Nations High Commissioner for Refugees stated that the protest was the result of a coordinated online campaign composed of misinformation, disinformation and hate speech against refugees. They urged Indonesians to double-check all information about Rohingya refugees available online as much of it is false or distorted, with images created by artificial intelligence, and hate speech spread through bot accounts. Della Masrida, a student from Abulyatama University, said that the protest was caused because the Rohingya came to Indonesia uninvited and feel like it is their country.

The leader of the protest, Teuku Wariza Aris Munandar, was a student at Al-Washliyah University. He said that he only demanded the deportation of Rohingya. On 28 December 2023, it was revealed that Wariza is affiliated with the Gerindra Party through the Hadi Surya Youth Front. Wariza later stated that the protest had nothing to do with his affiliation. Munandar was also revealed to be a former drug convict who was sentenced to two years in prison in September 2022 due to consuming methamphetamine, and added that he had been legally released.

== Reactions ==
Many social media users supported the anti-Rohingya protest. However, the United Nations High Commissioner for Refugees (UNHCR) condemned the action and stated that the protest was one of the results of misinformation, disinformation, and hate speech campaigns against Rohingya refugees. They also urged the Aceh government and law enforcement to provide protection for refugees, asylum seekers, and workers who handle the influx of refugees.

The Indonesian President, Joko Widodo, blamed a surge in human trafficking for the arrival of Rohingya refugees. The Ministry of Foreign Affairs of Indonesia minister, Retno Marsudi, remained silent regarding the incident. The National Human Right Commissioner, Parulian Sihombing, condemned the protests and asked the government and related institutions to ensure the protection of Rohingya refugees. Mahfud MD responded, saying that during the 2004 Indian Ocean earthquake and tsunami, Aceh had received aid from all over the world as refugees and questioned why the students now refused to help the Rohingya.

The executive director of ASEAN Studies Center at Gadjah Mada University, Dafri Agussalim, said that there is no need for students to act physically. The chair of the Alliance of Independent Journalists, Sasmito, regretted the protest due to the trauma caused to the refugees, especially women and children, due to violence. This action also resulted in condemnation from civil societies, including from KontraS Aceh and 11 women's organizations. The Ulema Deliberation Council of Aceh urged president Joko Widodo to solve the refugee crisis.

One of the refugees, Rohimatun, said that the protest scared her to death and caused her children to catch a fever. Another refugee, Muhammad Syakhi, said that he escaped from Bangladesh to Aceh due to the news that the people were friendly, which apparently was not the case. A refugee, Muhammad Ridwan, said that it would be better to stay in Indonesia than to return to Bangladesh.

The incident also received coverage from several international media, such as Al Jazeera, Euronews, Reuters, and DW News. Palestinian journalist Hebh Jamal commented about the protest on her Instagram stories. She stated that Indonesia is hypocritical for organizing protests for Palestine's independence while treating refugees with the same hatred that Israel has towards Palestinians. She added that Palestine doesn't need support from Indonesians who do not support the liberation and survival of refugees. The opinion section on Radar Banjarmasin (Jawa Pos) called the student protesters "neo-fascists".

== Aftermath ==
On 28 December 2023, Mahfud MD moved the 137 Rohingya refugees from Meuseraya Aceh Hall to the Indonesian Red Cross Society and Aceh Foundation Building, with the help of Jusuf Kalla. He also deployed police personnel to maintain the security of Rohingya refugees. On 29 December, the students returned the refugees to Meuseuraya Aceh Hall because the Ministry of Law and Human Rights were not providing adequate facilities. The coordinator of the protest, Teuku Wariza, made an apology and stated that it was infiltrated by provocateurs. He also stated that its original intent was to urge the government and the Aceh House of Representatives (DPRA) to solve the refugee crisis.

On 6 January 2025, more than 260 Rohingyas arrived in Aceh after being rejected by Malaysia. In June 2026, the Aceh Regional Office of the Directorate General of Immigration reported that 340 Rohingya refugees are still stranded in various evacuation centers throughout the province.
