= Mohammad Laica Marzuki =

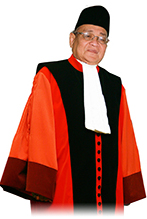
- Mohammad Laica Marzuki

1st Deputy Chief Justice of the Constitutional Court of Indonesia
- In office 22 August 2003 – 5 May 2008
- President: Megawati Sukarnoputri
- Preceded by: Office established
- Succeeded by: Achmad Sodiki

Personal details
- Born: 5 May 1941 (age 85) Tekolampe, Sinjai Regency, South Sulawesi, Dutch East Indies
- Citizenship: Indonesian

Mohammad Laica Marzuki is a former judge of the Constitutional Court of Indonesia, as well as the first Deputy Chief Justice of the Constitutional Court of Indonesia. During his tenure, Marzuki was one of three of the Constitutional Court's nine members to dissent from the majority opinion that rejected the appeal of Bali Nine members Myuran Sukumaran and Andrew Chan. This follows Marzuki's view that the death penalty in general does not deter criminals and violates the Constitution of Indonesia. Marzuki has also expressed the view that the actions of the Attorney General of Indonesia must be subordinate to the decisions of the Constitutional Court, and that actions which conflict with such decisions are illegal under the law of Indonesia.

Marzuki remained active in the judicial field even after his retirement as a constitutional judge. He has defended the constitutional right of people to smoke cigarettes.

Legal offices
Preceded by Established	Deputy Chief Justice of the Constitutional Court of Indonesia; 2003-2008	Succeeded by Achmad Sodiki
