= Hamdan Zoelva =

Indonesian politician and lawyer (born 1962)

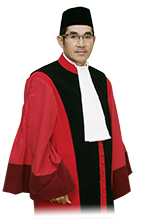

4th Chief Justice of the Constitutional Court of Indonesia
- In office 6 November 2013 – 7 January 2015
- Appointed by: Susilo Bambang Yudhoyono
- Preceded by: Akil Mochtar
- Succeeded by: Arief Hidayat

3rd Deputy Chief Justice of the Constitutional Court of Indonesia
- In office 13 August 2013 – 6 November 2013
- Appointed by: Susilo Bambang Yudhoyono
- Preceded by: Achmad Sodiki
- Succeeded by: Arief Hidayat

Personal details
- Born: 21 June 1962 (age 64) Bima, West Nusa Tenggara, Indonesia
- Spouse: R.A. Nina Damayanti
- Education: Hasanuddin University; Padjadjaran University
- Profession: Justice, Advocate

Hamdan Zoelva (born 21 June 1962 in Bima, West Nusa Tenggara) is an Indonesian politician and lawyer. He was the Chief Justice of the Indonesian Constitutional Court from 2013 to 2015, succeeding Akil Mochtar whose appointment was terminated after he was implicated in a bribery case related to an election dispute of Lebak Regency, Banten. Prior to his appointment as a Justice of the Constitutional Court, Zoelva served as a former leader of the Crescent Star Party. After stepping down as a Chief Justice, he works as a legal consultant and a lecturer at several universities. He is currently a chairman of Syarikat Islam, an Islamist organisation.

== Childhood ==
Zoelva was born to TG. KH. Muhammad Hasan, the leader of Al-Mukhlisin boarding school in Bima, and Hj. Siti Zaenab. Zoelva spent his childhood in the village of Parado, located about 50 kilometers from the city of Bima. He grew up in a tradition that valued family and community values, and attended public schools.

== As the chief justice of the Indonesian Constitutional Court ==
In 2013, Zoelva was appointed Chief Justice of the Constitutional Court of the Republic of Indonesia, replacing Akil Mochtar, who was dismissed due to his involvement in a bribery scandal over a local election dispute. Zoelva was selected by his peers through two rounds of voting mechanism. Eight constitutional judges participated in this selection, namely Zoelva, Harjono, Arief Hidayat, Anwar Usman, Ahmad Fadhil Sumadi, Patrialis Akbar, Muhammad Alim, and Maria Farida Indrati, and chaired by Hamdan Zoelva himself.

== Private life ==
Zoelva married to R.A. Nina Damayanti and has three children, namely Muhammad Faris Aufar, Arya Ahmad Hanafi, A. Adib Karamy. Zoelva has a hobby of playing golf and speak English active and passive Arabic.

Legal offices
Preceded by Achmad Sodiki	Deputy Chief Justice of the Constitutional Court of Indonesia; 2013	Succeeded by Arief Hidayat
Preceded by Akil Mochtar	Chief Justice of the Constitutional Court of Indonesia; 2013-2015	Succeeded by Arief Hidayat
