= Daniel Yusmic Pancastaki Foekh =

Constitutional Court of Indonesia justice

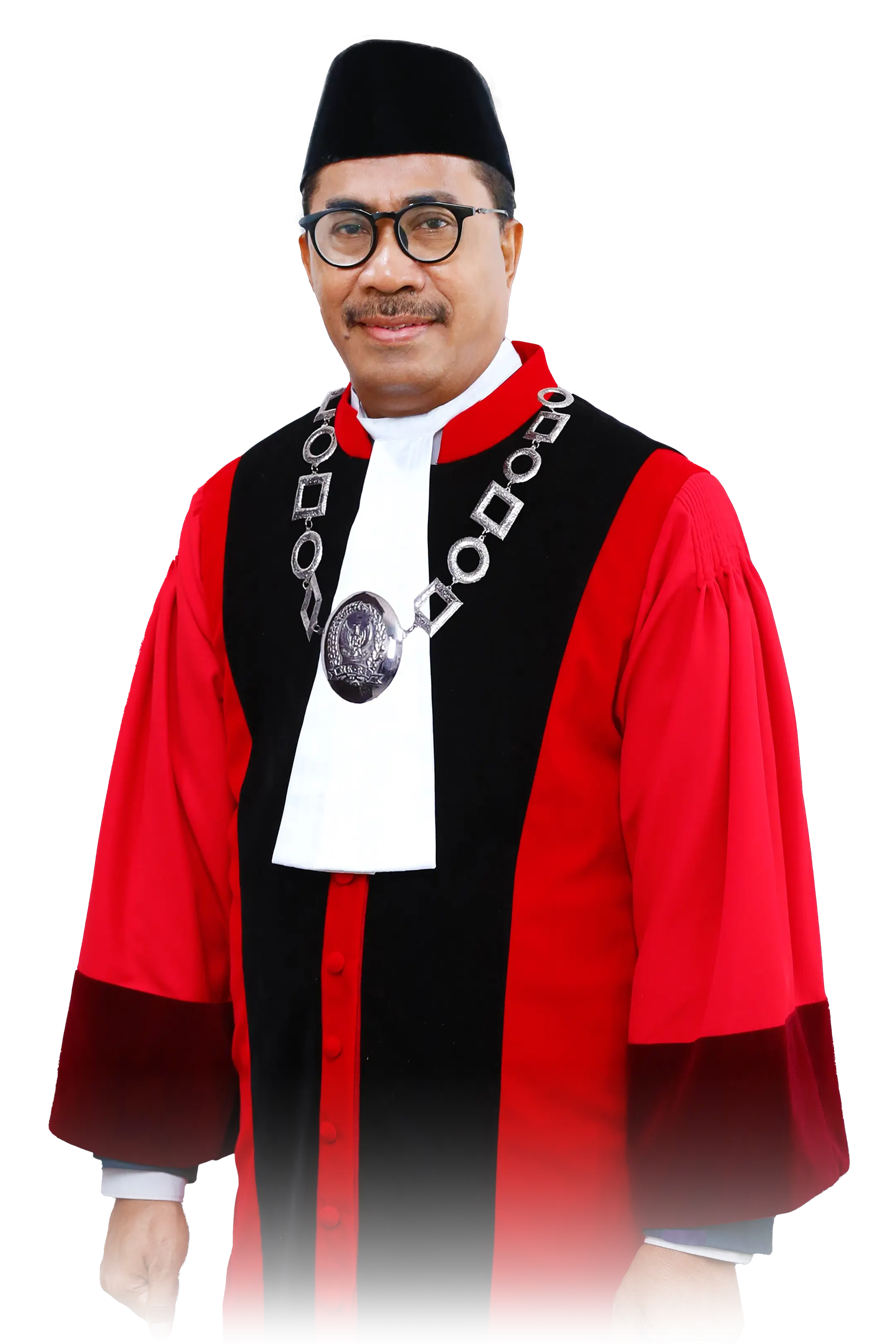

Justice on the Constitutional Court of Indonesia
- Incumbent
- Assumed office 7 January 2020
- President: Joko Widodo
- Preceded by: I Dewa Gede Palguna

Personal details
- Born: 15 December 1964 (age 61) Kupang, East Nusa Tenggara, Indonesia
- Citizenship: Indonesian

Daniel Yusmic Pancastaki Foekh is a justice of the nine-member Constitutional Court of Indonesia for the period 2020-2025.

He was appointed on 7 January 2020 to replace outgoing judge I Dewa Gede Palguna, who completed his second term at the court. He was selected by President Joko Widodo over two other candidates for the position: former Judicial Commission chairman Suparman Marzuki and former General Elections Commission commissioner Ida Budhiati.

Welcoming Daniel to the court, his predecessor Palguna said every judge at least once in their life stands close to the "forbidden boundary" and he hoped Daniel would never cross that line, even in difficult circumstances.

Daniel is a law academic originally from Kupang, East Nusa Tenggara province. He studied law at Atma Jaya Catholic University, where he later became a lecturer in law and the head of state administrative law. As an academic, he conducted a study of Government Regulations in Lieu of Law (Perppu), recording all of the Perppu that have been issued from Indonesian independence through to the administration of President Joko Widodo.
