= Chilman Arisman =

Indonesian diplomat

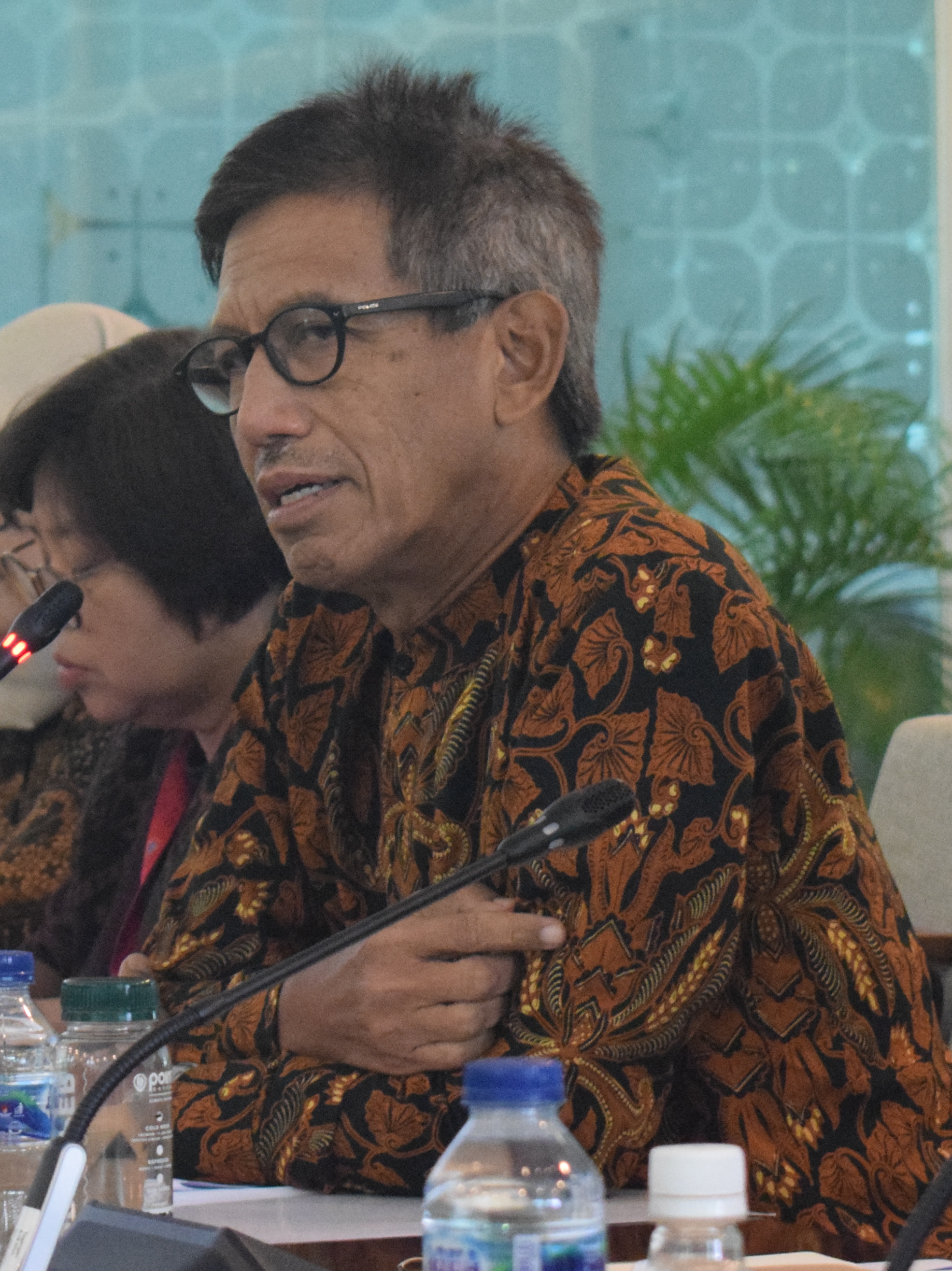
- Chilman in 2024

1st Ambassador of The Republic of Indonesia for Kingdom of Bahrain
- In office October 20, 2012 – January, 2017

Personal details
- Born: August 5, 1960 (age 65) Yogyakarta, Indonesia
- Spouse: Sunar Ratnawati
- Occupation: Ambassador
- Profession: Diplomat

Chilman Arisman (born 5 August 1960) is an Indonesian diplomat. Since 1 February 2017, he was appointed as Senior Official in the Directorate for ASEAN Political Security Cooperation, Ministry Foreign Affairs of the Republic of Indonesia. Before stepping in his current position, he was Ambassador of the Republic of Indonesia to the Kingdom of Bahrain, from October 2012 –January 2017.

In more than 30 years of service for the Indonesian Ministry of Foreign Affairs of the Republic of Indonesia, Mr. Chilman Arisman has been posted in Saudi Arabia (Jeddah), the United States of America (Los Angeles), Malaysia (Kuala Lumpur and Penang) and Bahrain. His earliest post was as Vice Consul at the Indonesian Consulate General in Jeddah, Kingdom of Saudi Arabia, from 1989-1993. He later headed off to Indonesian Consulate General in Los Angeles, the United States of America, in 1995-1999, as Consul for Economic Affairs. Then he was appointed as Counsellor, before becoming as Minister Counsellor, heading Economic Division at the Embassy of the Republic of Indonesia in Kuala Lumpur, Malaysia, from 2002 -2006. Before becoming the Indonesian Ambassador to the Kingdom of Bahrain, Mr. Chilman Arisman was Consul General of the Republic of Indonesia to Penang, Malaysia, from September 2010 – October 2012.

Serving his domestic duties at the Foreign Ministry's headquarters in Jakarta, Indonesia, Mr. Chilman Arisman started out his responsibilities as Staff at the Directorate for Economic Cooperation Among Developing Countries, Ministry of Foreign Affairs, from 1986-1989. Then, he took the position as Head of the Section for the Directorate for Economic Multilateral Cooperation, Ministry of Foreign Affairs, from 1993-1995. In 1999-2002, he was appointed as Deputy Director for ASEAN Economic Cooperation, Ministry of Foreign Affairs. The last position in Ministry of Foreign Affairs of the Republic of Indonesia was as Director for Dialogue Partners and Inter-regional Cooperation of ASEAN, Ministry of Foreign Affairs of the Republic of Indonesia, from 2007-2010.

Mr. Chilman Arisman has a vast experience in various regional and international conferences in addition to numerous bilateral engagements. Among others are his involvement at various conferences of Association of Southeast Asian Nations (ASEAN), East Asia Summit (EAS), Non-Aligned Movement, Organization of Islamic Cooperation (OIC) and Economic and Social Commission for Asia and Pacific (ESCAP) as well as various bilateral meeting between Indonesia and Saudi Arabia, the United States, Malaysia and Bahrain.

In 1984, Mr. Chilman Arisman graduated from Faculty of Economics, Islamic University of Indonesia (UII), Yogyakarta, Indonesia. Mr. Chilman Arisman was born on 5 August 1960, in Yogyakarta, Indonesia. He is married to Mrs. Sunar Ratnawati and blessed with three children. He loves jogging and singing.
