= Arsul Sani =

Indonesian politician

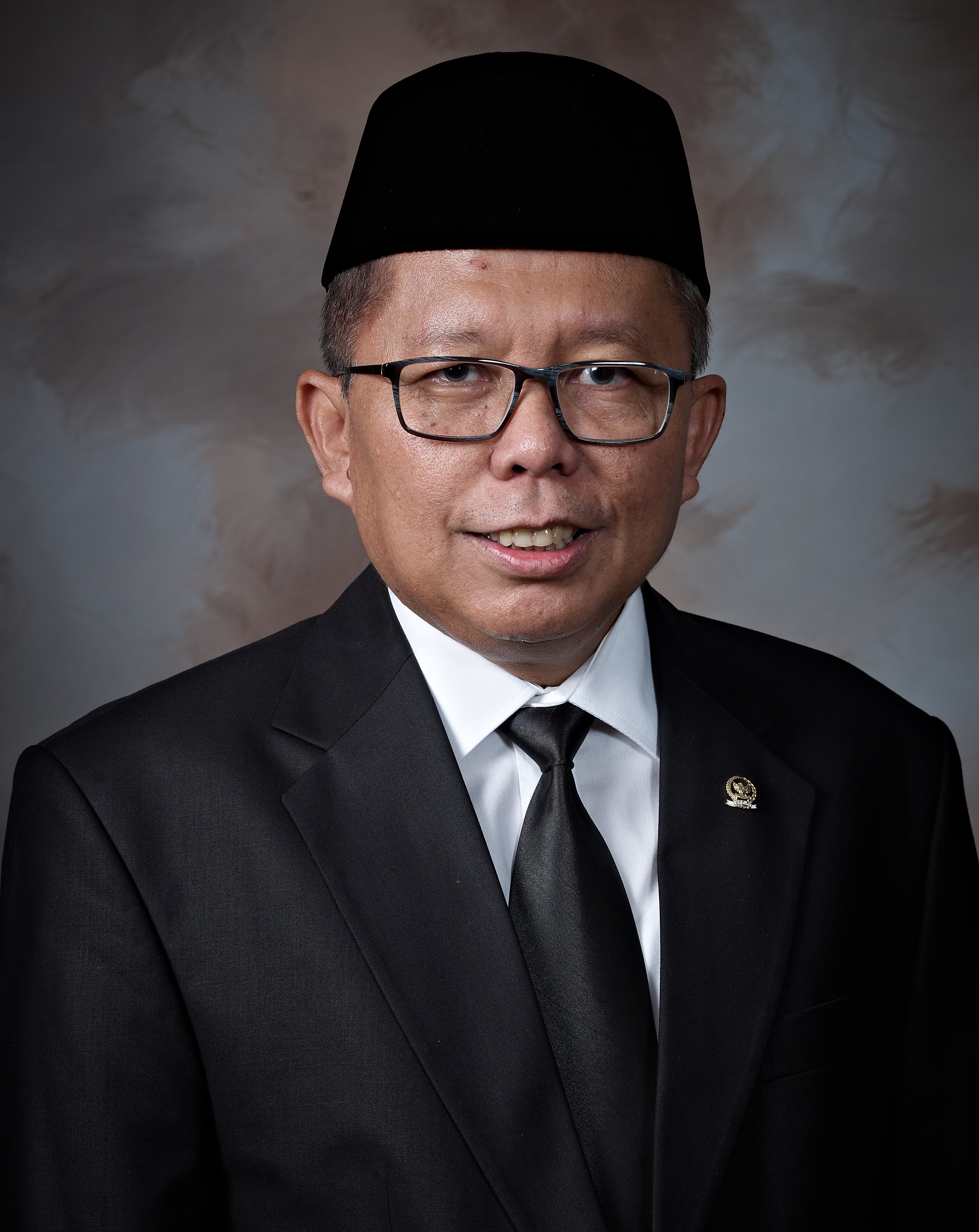

Justice of the Constitutional Court of Indonesia
- Incumbent
- Assumed office 18 January 2024
- Preceded by: Wahiduddin Adams

Deputy Speaker of People's Consultative Assembly
- In office 3 October 2019 – 18 January 2024
- President: Joko Widodo
- Speaker of the People's Consultative Assembly: Bambang Soesatyo

Secretary General of United Development Party
- In office 20 May 2016 – 5 January 2021
- Chairman: Muhammad Romahurmuziy; Suharso Monoarfa
- Preceded by: Muhammad Romahurmuziy
- Succeeded by: Muhamad Arwani Thomafi

Personal details
- Born: 8 January 1964 (age 62) Pekalongan, Central Java, Indonesia

Arsul Sani is an Indonesian politician who is currently serving as a justice of the Constitutional Court of Indonesia. He was appointed a judge to replace Justice Wahiduddin Adams who retired in January 2024.

Prior to coming to the Constitutional Court, he was the secretary-general of the United Development Party, (PPP). He was also a member of the People's Representative Council, sitting on the legislature's Commission III specializing in legal affairs.

Via his seat on the legislature's Commission III, Sani was involved in attempts to ban black magic, a move which had proven difficult since the 1990s because banning it would require the government to acknowledge that it exists. Sani also commented on the controversy surrounding the November 2016 Jakarta protests, questioning why police had financially investigated some of the protests' backers but not the financial backers of Jakarta governor Basuki Tjahaja Purnama.

Sani studied law at University of Indonesia. He continued his Master studies in communication at London School of Public Relations. Sani holds a doctoral degree from Glasgow Caledonian University.
