= Akil Mochtar =

3rd Chief Justice of the Constitutional Court of Indonesia

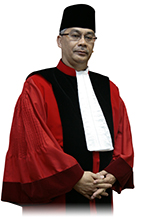

3rd Chief Justice of the Constitutional Court of Indonesia
- In office 3 April 2013 – 5 October 2013
- Appointed by: Susilo Bambang Yudhoyono
- Preceded by: Mahfud MD
- Succeeded by: Hamdan Zoelva

Personal details
- Born: 18 October 1960 (age 65) Kapuas Hulu Regency, West Kalimantan, Indonesia
- Education: Padjadjaran University
- Profession: Justice

Akil Mochtar (born 18 October 1960) is a convicted former Chief Justice of the Constitutional Court of Indonesia that was indicted for his acceptance of bribery for an election dispute case, prompting President of Indonesia Susilo Bambang Yudhoyono, who appointed him, to sign legislation creating a permanent ethics body to supervise the Constitutional Court of Indonesia.

== Career ==
On 3 April 2013, Akil Mochtar was elected the third chief justice. Akil was supported with seven of the nine votes cast. Akil, a former politician from the Golkar party, had been a justice of the Constitutional Court since 2008 and has a reportedly conservative approach in legal matters. He has said that in contrast to his predecessor, Machfud MD, he "would not talk to reporters much about politics." On 2 October 2013, Mochtar was arrested by anti-corruption officials for allegedly accepting at least $250,000 in bribes, relating to a disputed election in Kalimantan. Several days later, president Susilo Bambang Yudhoyono announced that Akil was temporarily suspended from his position as chief justice of the court and that new and stricter procedures for the appointment of justices to the court would be introduced. Shortly after, the independent ethics council declared that Akil had been removed from his position and that the post of chief justice was vacant. In the subsequent legal process, numerous instances of allegedly corrupt payments that Akil had received as a justice were presented by prosecutors.

Legal offices
Preceded by Mohammad Mahfud	Chief Justice of the Constitutional Court of Indonesia; 2013-2013	Succeeded by Hamdan Zoelva
