= Chief Justice of the Constitutional Court of Indonesia =

Head of the Constitutional Court of Indonesia

- Ketua Mahkamah Konstitusi Republik Indonesia
- Emblem of Constitutional Court of Indonesia

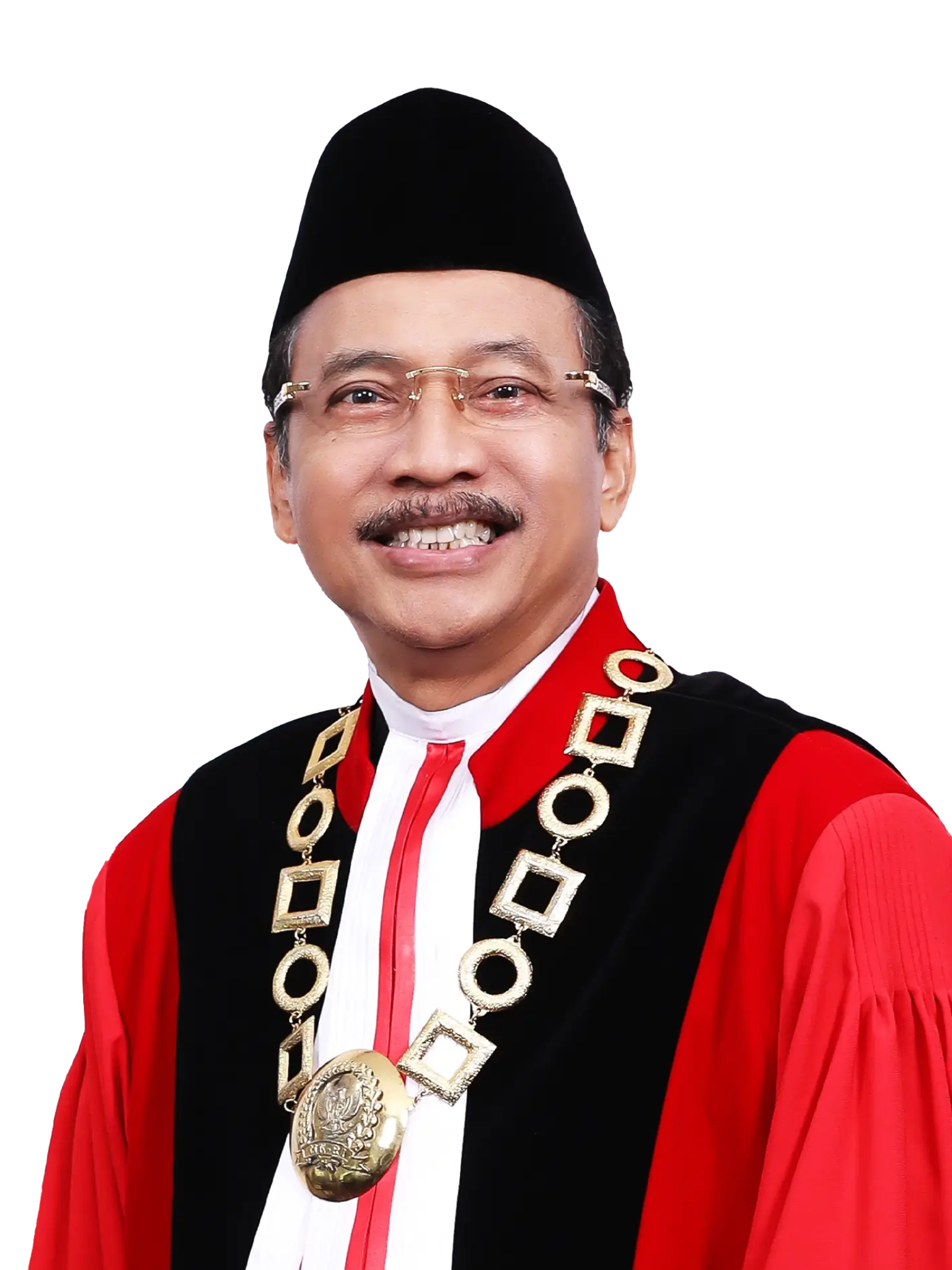
- Incumbent; Suhartoyo since 13 November 2023
- Constitutional Court of Indonesia
- Seat: Jakarta
- Formation: 22 August 2003
- First holder: Jimly Asshiddiqie
- Deputy: Deputy Chief Justice of the Constitutional Court of Indonesia (Wakil Ketua Mahkamah Konstitusi)

The chief justice of the Constitutional Court of Indonesia (Indonesian: Ketua Mahkamah Konstitusi) is the head of the Constitutional Court of Indonesia.

== List of chief justices ==
Name	Term		Term length (days)
Jimly Asshiddiqie	22 August 2003	19 August 2008	1,824
Mahfud MD	19 August 2008	3 April 2013	1,688
Akil Mochtar	3 April 2013	5 October 2013	185
Hamdan Zoelva	6 November 2013	7 January 2015	427
Arief Hidayat	14 January 2015	2 April 2018	1,174
Anwar Usman	2 April 2018	7 November 2023	2,045
Suhartoyo	13 November 2023	Incumbent	1,078

First chief justice. The first chief justice was Jimly Asshiddiqie. He was well known as law professor of the University of Indonesia, and actively involved in the process of Indonesian constitutional reform and the political transformation to democracy. During the crisis in the transitional era under the presidency of Habibie (1998–1999), he chaired the Reformation Committee for law reform. As scholar, he often makes media appearances and offers comments on a range of public policy issues, until he was elected Chief Justice of the Court. As a scholar he has published more than 40 books on various legal and constitutional issues and some textbooks used in the universities all over Indonesia.

Second chief justice. The second chief justice, Mahfud MD, first elected in 2008, was re-elected in mid-2011 for a second term. Mahfud won the votes of five of the nine court judges, ahead of two other candidates. Mahfud MD was noted for his media and public comment. He was popular as a politician and member of parliament before being elected judge for the Constitutional Court. His comments and media appearances were sometimes controversial. Following his re-election, The Jakarta Post noted that "He is down to earth and his courage is well known" but also suggested that "As chief judge of the Constitutional Court, he should rather talk less and in contexts of the Constitution." His name is sometimes mentioned in the media as a possible presidential candidate in the 2014 elections. His term as chief justice ended on 1 April 2013.

Third chief justice. On 3 April 2013, Akil Mochtar was elected the third chief justice. Akil was supported with seven of the nine votes cast. Akil, a former politician from the Golkar party, had been a justice of the Constitutional Court since 2008 and has a reportedly conservative approach in legal matters. He has said that in contrast to his predecessor, Machmud MD, he "would not talk to reporters much about politics." On 2 October 2013, Mochtar was arrested by anti-corruption officials for allegedly accepting at least $250,000 in bribes, relating to a disputed election in Kalimantan. Several days later, president Susilo Bambang Yudhoyono announced that Akil was temporarily suspended from his position as chief justice of the court and that new and stricter procedures for the appointment of justices to the court would be introduced. Shortly after, the independent ethics council declared that Akil had been removed from his position and that the post of chief justice was vacant. In the subsequent legal process, numerous instances of allegedly corrupt payments that Akil had received as a justice were presented by prosecutors.

Fourth chief justice. On 1 November 2013, Justice Hamdan Zoelva was elected as the fourth chief justice for the period 2013-2016. Hamdan, a former member of parliament from the Muslim-based Crescent Star Party (Partai Bulan Bintang or PBB), was elected by his colleagues after two rounds of voting. Hamdan spoke of the need to reform faith in the court and said he would create a permanent ethics council to oversee the conduct of justices. Some observers, however, doubted that it would be easy for Hamdan to introduce such changes.

Fifth chief justice. On 14 January 2015, Justice Arief Hidayat was elected as the fifth chief justice. In December 2017, he denied committing an ethics violation by lobbying the House of Representatives for an extension of his term in office. He admitted to meeting legislators at a Jakarta hotel but denied doing any lobbying. He came under criticism over alleged backroom deals regarding the House’s inquiry into the Corruption Eradication Commission (KPK) under the 2014 Legislative Institutions Law (MD3), which was under review by the Constitutional Court. Academicians in February 2018 demanded he step down for alleged ethical violations. He was re-elected to serve a second and final term until 2023 but he was replaced in April 2018.

Sixth chief justice. On 2 April 2018, Justice Anwar Usman was elected as the sixth chief justice. He is due to serve to 2020.

== See also ==
- Chief Justice of the Supreme Court of Indonesia
