= Marsillam Simanjuntak =

Indonesian politician

Marsillam Simanjuntak (born 23 February 1943 in Yogyakarta) is a retired Indonesian politician who served as Secretary of the Cabinet from January 2000, as Minister of Justice from June 2001, and as Attorney General of Indonesia between July 2001 and August 2001.

Simanjuntak graduated from the Faculty of Medicine at the University of Indonesia in 1971. In 1974 he was held in a military detention center over his alleged involvement in the Malari incident. He was never prosecuted during or after his detention.

In October 2006 Simanjuntak was appointed President of the Presidential Working Unit Management and Reform Programme (UKP3R).
