= Patrialis Akbar =

Indonesian lawyer and politician

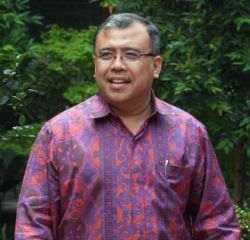
- Akbar in 2010

27th Minister of Law and Human Rights
- In office 22 October 2009 – 19 October 2011
- President: Susilo Bambang Yudhoyono
- Preceded by: Mohammad Andi Mattalatta
- Succeeded by: Amir Syamsuddin

Personal details
- Born: 31 October 1958 (age 67) Padang, West Sumatra, Indonesia

Patrialis Akbar (born 31 October 1958) is an advocate and politician who was a member of the Constitutional Court Justice of the Indonesian Constitutional Court for the period 2013–2017 from Padang, West Sumatra. He has a complete career in three branches of state, legislative, executive and judicial power. He had served as a member of the House of Representatives for two periods (1999–2004 and 2004–2009).

== Education and early career ==
He obtained his law degree from the Muhammadiyah University of Jakarta and then had a career as an advocate.

Early in his career Patrialis Akbar had worked as a city transportation driver majoring in Pasar Senen-Jatinegara, Jakarta, and taxi drivers in the capital. After earning a law degree at the University of Muhammadiyah Jakarta, he pursued the lawyer's profession for some time before finally starting to plunge into politics, and joined the National Mandate Party (PAN), which later led him to become a member of the People's Representative Council(DPR) for two periods 1999-2004 and 2004-2009 from the electoral district of West Sumatra. [6] While in Senayan, Patrialis had joined the DPR and the People's Consultative Assembly(MPR). In the MPR, Patrialis was listed as one of the actors in the amendments to the 1999 - 2002 1945 Constitution by becoming a Member of the BP MPR, PAH III, and PAH I. This PAH III (1999) and PAH I (2000-2002) designed the amendments to the 1945 Constitution. in the DPR, Patrialis was listed as commission III, one of which was in charge of legal matters. During the administration of President Susilo Bambang Yudhoyono he was elected Minister of Law and Human Rights of the Second United Indonesia Cabinet . He would eventually become Constitutional Justice after giving his oath of office as a constitutional judge for the term of office from 2013 to 2018 on August 13 at the State Palace, Jakarta.

== Justice Minister ==
Akbar was part of the Second United Indonesia Cabinet and served as Minister of Justice and Human Rights in Indonesia from 22 October 2009 until 19 October 2011.

== Constitutional Court Justice ==
In 2013, former President Susilo Bambang Yudhoyono attempted to appoint Akbar to the Constitutional Court of Indonesia at the end of Achmad Sodiki's term, but the Jakarta State Administrative Court blocked Akbar's appointment as well as that of his fellow justice Maria Farida Indrati. Legal activists cited Akbar's poor performance as a minister as well as his personal ties to the president. Yudhoyono's office appealed the ruling on behalf of Akbar and Indrati, succeeding after the Jakarta High Administrative Court found that the petition against Akbar and Indrati lacked legal standing for the challenge.

In June 2015, Akbar rejected a judicial review requested by children's rights groups to raise Indonesia's minimum age for marriage for women from 16 to 18. He said there was no guarantee raising the age limit would reduce the incidence of divorce, health problems or social problems.

== Corruption arrest and conviction ==
Akbar's tenure on the Constitutional Court was cut short despite the presidential appeals that had led to his initial appointment. In January 2017, the Corruption Eradication Commission arrested Akbar and 10 other defendants in a sting operation on suspicion of corruption in an animal health law. Constitutional Chief Justice Arief Hidayat led an investigation into three justices, clearing fellow justices Manahan Sitompul and I Dewa Gede Palguna but finding enough evidence for Akbar's dismissal.

On 4 September 2017, Jakarta Corruption Court sentenced Akbar to eight years in jail and fined him Rp300 million. The court found he had accepted bribes from a beef importer in connection with a judicial review of the 2014 Animal Husbandry and Livestock Health Law. Patrialis only received US$10,000 or half of the amount of US$20,000 given [as bribes] from businessman Basuki Hariman through [middleman] Kamaluddin. In August 2019, the Supreme Court said it had cut Akbar's sentence to seven years in jail, saying there were mitigating circumstances: he had only received half of the bribe money, and he had spent Rp4 million of that money on playing golf with Kamaluddin, the middleman. The Supreme Court judges who cut his sentence were Andi Samsan Nganro, L.L. Hutagalung and Sri Murwahyuni.

Basuki Hariman was released in 2023 after serving part of his sentence and has returned to the import business, re-establishing himself as a significant player in Indonesia’s meat and garlic imports through a network of companies linked to him. Akbar got an early release in 2022 from Sukamiskin penitentiary in Bandung.
