= Deputy Chief Justice of the Constitutional Court of Indonesia =

- Wakil Ketua Mahkamah Konstitusi

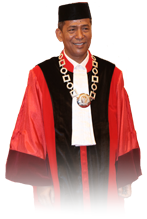
- Incumbent; Saldi Isra since 15 March 2023
- Constitutional Court of Indonesia
- Seat: Jakarta
- Appointer: Constitutional Court justices
- Formation: 22 August 2003
- First holder: Mohammad Laica Marzuki

The Deputy Chief Justice of the Constitutional Court of Indonesia (Indonesian: Wakil Ketua Mahkamah Konstitusi) is the second highest-ranking official serving on the Constitutional Court of Indonesia. Like the Chief Justice of the Constitutional Court of Indonesia, the Deputy Chief Justice is elected by the nine serving justices on the court from among their number.

In 2011, term limits for the Deputy Chief Justice as well as the Chief Justice were reduced from three years to two and a half years.

== List of Deputy Chief Justices ==
Number	Name	Period of office		Length of term (days)
1	Mohammad Laica Marzuki	22 August 2003	5 May 2008	1,718
2	Achmad Sodiki	19 August 2008	13 August 2013	1,820
3	Hamdan Zoelva	13 August 2013	6 November 2013	85
4	Arief Hidayat	6 November 2013	14 January 2015	434
5	Anwar Usman	14 January 2015	2 April 2018	1,174
6	Aswanto	2 April 2018	30 September 2022	3,080
7	Saldi Isra	15 March 2023	Incumbent	1,272

== See also ==
- Deputy Chief Justice of the Supreme Court of Indonesia
