= Perempuan dalam Pasungan =

1980 film by Ismail Soebardjo

- Directed by: Ismail Soebardjo
- Written by: Ismail Soebardjo
- Produced by: Hendrick Gozali
- Starring: Nungky Kusumastuti; D Djajakusuma; Sofia (Sofia WD); Rini S Bono; Frans Tumbuan; Sentot Sahid
- Cinematography: Tantra Surjadi
- Production company: PT Garuda Film
- Release date: 1980
- Running time: 109 minutes
- Country: Indonesia
- Language: Indonesian language

Perempuan dalam Pasungan is a 1980 Indonesian drama film directed by Ismail Soebardjo. The film won four awards at the Indonesian Film Festival in 1981.

== Cast ==
- Nungki Kusumastuti
- Frans Tumbuan
- Rini S. Bono
- Sentot Sudiharto

== Accolades ==
Award	Year	Category	Recipient	Result
Indonesian Film Festival	1981	Best Feature Film		Won
Indonesian Film Festival	1981	Best Directing	Ismail Soebardjo	Won
Indonesian Film Festival	1981	Best Camera	Tantra Surjadi	Won
Indonesian Film Festival	1981	Best Art Direction	Benny Benhardi	Won
Indonesian Film Festival	1981	Best Screenplay	Ismail Soebardjo	Nominated
Indonesian Film Festival	1981	Best Lead Actress	Nungky Kusumastuti	Nominated
Indonesian Film Festival	1981	Best Supporting Actress	Rini S Bono	Nominated
Indonesian Film Festival	1981	Best Editing	Suryo Susanto	Nominated
