= Jimly Asshiddiqie =

1st Chief Justice of the Constitutional Court of Indonesia

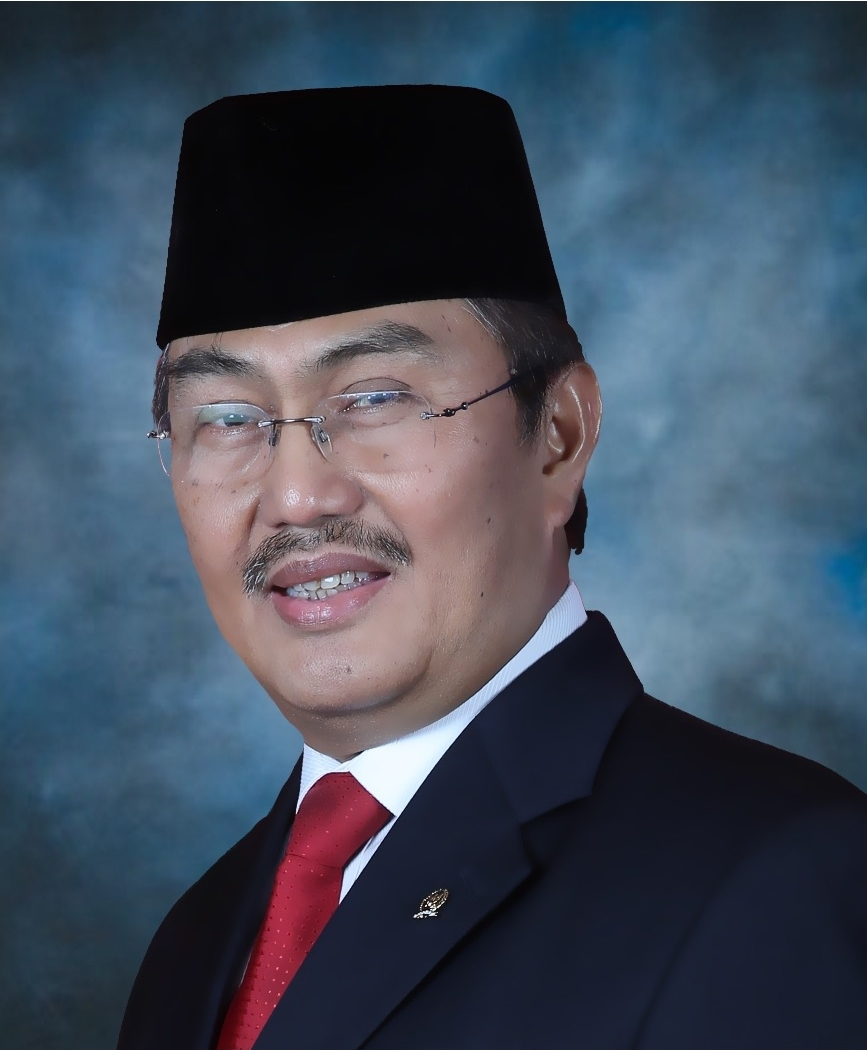
- Official portrait, 2019

Senator for Jakarta
- Incumbent
- Assumed office 1 October 2019

1st Chief of Honorary Council of Electoral Officers
- In office 12 June 2012 – 12 June 2017
- Preceded by: Position established
- Succeeded by: Harjono

Member of Presidential Advisory Council
- In office 25 January 2010 – 21 June 2010 Serving with List: Hassan Wirajuda; Ryaas Rasyid; Ginandjar Kartasasmita; Ma'ruf Amin; Widodo Adi Sutjipto; Meutia Hatta Swasono; Siti Fadilah Supari
- Appointed by: Susilo Bambang Yudhoyono
- Chairman: Emil Salim
- Preceded by: Adnan Buyung Nasution
- Succeeded by: Albert Hasibuan

1st Chief Justice of the Constitutional Court of Indonesia
- In office 22 August 2003 – 19 August 2008
- Appointed by: Megawati Sukarnoputri
- Preceded by: Position established
- Succeeded by: Mahfud MD

Personal details
- Born: Jimly Asshiddiqie; 17 April 1956 (age 70) Palembang, South Sumatra, Indonesia
- Spouse: Tuty Amalia
- Children: Robby Ferliansyah; Sheera Maulidya; Afida Nurul Fazria; Mieska Alia Farhana; Rafi Fakhrurrazy
- Education: University of Indonesia; Leiden University

Jimly Asshiddiqie (born 17 April 1956) is an Indonesian academic and politician who served as the first chief justice of Indonesia's Constitutional Court from 2003 to 2008.

== Education and academic career ==
Jimly graduated from high school in Palembang in 1973. He obtained his law degree from the University of Indonesia (UI) in 1982. In 1986, he obtained his master's in law from UI. In 1990, he obtained his doctorate in law from UI and the Van Vollenhoven Institute, as well as the Leiden University Law Faculty. In 1998, Jimly became a Professor of Constitutional Law at the UI Faculty of Law.

He has authored more than 60 academic publications. He has also written hundreds of articles and papers, published by various media and delivered at various forums. His books include "Green Constitution", "Economic Constitution", "Social Constitution", "Court of Ethics and Constitutional Ethics" and "The Constitution of Cultures and Constitutional Cultures" (no source given).

== Political career ==
During the final years of President Suharto's rule, Jimly served as an Expert Staff (advisor) to the Minister of Education (1993–1998). Jimly was a member of the Golkar faction (Utusan Golongan) in the People's Consultative Assembly for the 1997-1998 period, which in March 1998 unanimously re-elected Suharto as president for a seventh term, despite mounting public opposition that saw Suharto resign two months later. In 1998, shortly before the fall of Suharto, Jimly was appointed Assistant to Vice President B. J. Habibie.

After Habibie became president in May 1998, Jimly was chairman of the Legal Working Group on the National Reform Team Toward Civil Society. His working group helped to prepare new legislation, as well as amendments to the 1945 Constitution and the introduction of a system for direct presidential elections. Also under Habibie, Jimly was appointed Secretary for the Council of Law Enforcement and Security chaired by the president. He was the person in charge of the Constitutional Reform Panel under the coordination of Bagir Manan at the State Secretariat in 1998–1999.

Under President Abdurrahman Wahid, Jimly was an advisor to the Minister of Industry and Trade from 2001 to 2003. He was a member of the Expert Committee of the People's Assembly Working Body (2001–2002), and an Expert Advisor to the Secretariat General of the MPR to prepare amendments to the 1945 Constitution (2002–2003).

When Jimly Asshiddiqie in Tanah Kusir Cemetery South Jakarta

Jimly chaired the Advisory Council of the National Commission on Human Rights for eight years from 2009 to 2017.

He was a member of the Indonesian Presidential Advisory Council from 25 January 2010 to 2014, serving President Susilo Bambang Yudhoyono.

He served as Vice Chairman of the National Council of Titles and Honors. He was chairman of the Election Organizers Ethics Council (DKPP) from June 2012 to 2017.

In August 2015, Jimly ran unsuccessfully for the leadership of the Corruption Eradication Commission (KPK). In December 2015, he was appointed chairman of the Indonesian Muslim Intellectuals Association (ICMI), a grouping that was formed in 1990 as part of an effort by then-President Suharto to use Islam to counterbalance the military's power.

In January 2020, Jimly was appointed to the Board of Directors of the Indonesian Cooperatives Council (Dekopin), which is led by convicted corruption felon Nurdin Halid.

Legal offices
New office	Chief Justice of the Constitutional Court of Indonesia; 2003–2008	Succeeded by Mohammad Mahfud
