= Islamic University of Indonesia =

Private university in Yogyakarta, Indonesia

Islamic University of Indonesia Indonesia
- Universitas Islam Indonesia
- Universitas Islam Indonesia Emblem
- Motto: Berilmu Amaliyah, Beramal Ilmiah
- Type: Private
- Established: July 8, 1945 (as Sekolah Tinggi Islam – Islamic Higher School); November 3, 1947 (as Universitas Islam Indonesia)
- Affiliations: FUIW, FIMA, SEAAIR, ASNA, ABI, ACICIS
- Rector: Prof. Fathul Wahid, S.T., M.Sc., Ph.D.
- Total staff: 769
- Students: 27,348
- Undergraduates: 24,371
- Postgraduates: 3,031
- Location: Jalan Kaliurang KM. 14.4, Sleman, Yogyakarta (main campus); Jalan Taman Siswa No. 158, Yogyakarta City (Faculty of Laws campus); Jalan Prawiro Kuat, Condong Catur, Sleman, Yogyakarta (Faculty of Economics campus); Jalan Cik Di Tiro No.1, Terban, Gondokusuman, Yogyakarta City (Other Campus), Indonesia
- Campus: Special Region of Yogyakarta, Indonesia.
- Colors: UII Blue
- Website: www.uii.ac.id

Islamic University of Indonesia (Universitas Islam Indonesia, abbreviated as UII) is a national private university in Yogyakarta, Indonesia. It was established on 27 Rajab 1364 (Islamic calendar) or on 8 July 1945 as Islamic Higher School (Sekolah Tinggi Islam or STI) by political figures of the day including Dr. Mohammad Hatta, Mohammad Natsir, Mohammad Roem, Wahid Hasyim, and Abdul Kahar Muzakir. STI developed into a university called Universitas Islam Indonesia on 14 December 1947. Historically, UII is the first private university in Indonesia established after Indonesian independence and considered by some as the oldest private university in the country, although Jakarta Theological Seminary actually precedes it in 1934.

The university seat is in Sleman, Special Region of Yogyakarta, and has a number of campuses within Yogyakarta city.

== History ==
In 1945, a general assembly meeting of the Masjoemi (Majelis Sjoero Moeslimin Indonesia) was held. The meeting was attended by political figures including Dr. Muhammad Hatta (the first vice president of Indonesia), Mohammad Natsir, Mohammad Roem, and Wachid Hasyim. One of the decisions of this meeting was the establishment of Sekolah Tinggi Islam (STI-Islamic Higher School). STI began operating on July 28, 1945 and developed into a university called Universitas Islam Indonesia (UII) on November 3, 1947.

UII had faculties of Religion, Law, Education, and Economics, which began operations in June 1948. About seven months later, UII was forced to close due to the Dutch military invasion. Many students and staff members joined the Indonesian military force to repel the invasion. In the early 1950s, shortly after the war, UII had to move its classes around the city of Yogyakarta, even using part of the Sultan's Palace and some of the faculty members' houses as classrooms.

UII saw much improvement between 1961 and 1970 under the leadership of Prof. R.H.A. Kasmat Bahuwinangun (1960–1963) and Prof. Dr. dr. Sardjito (1964–1970). During his term in office, Bahuwinangun helped develop UII's Faculty of Islamic Studies and Faculty of Tarbiyah as well as expanding to Purwokerto to establish the Faculty of Law and Syari'ah.

From 1964 to 1970, under the leadership of Dr. Sardjito (a leading medical doctor), UII expanded to encompass 22 faculties: five were in Yogyakarta. The rest were in three provinces: Central Java (Solo, Klaten, and Purwokerto); and West and North Sulawesi (Gorontalo). The areas of study offered were Economics, Law, Islamic Law (Syari'ah), Islamic Education (Tarbiyah), Engineering, Medicine, Veterinary Medicine, and Pharmacy. However, when government regulations prevented UII from maintaining educational activities outside Yogyakarta, UII had to close its branch campuses. Some of them became associated with local institutions, including the Faculty of Medicine, which was closed in 1975.

In the early 1970s to 1982, UII saw extensive physical development of its offices and faculty buildings, beginning with the current central office on busy Cik di Tiro Street. This construction was followed by the development of three other campuses throughout the city. During this period, several of UII's faculties acquired accreditation and initiated collaboration with national and international entities, including Gadjah Mada University, King Abdul Azis University of Saudi Arabia, and The Asia Foundation.

Since the beginning of the 1990s, UII has been developing an integrated campus in Sleman regency, in the northern part of the province of Yogyakarta. Most of UII's faculties and buildings will eventually be on these 25 hectares of land.

=== Ranking ===
University rankings

Global – Overall
- THE World: 1501+ (2023)

Regional – Overall
- QS Asia: 501-550 (2023)

Universitas Islam Indonesia is one of the top private universities in Yogyakarta, Indonesia. It is ranked 501-550 in Asian University Rankings 2023, and in the same year, for the first time UII's ranked by the Times Higher Education World University Rankings with a global ranking of 1501+.

In Indonesia itself, UII has received "Unggul" accreditation from BAN-PT (No. 705/SK/BAN-PT/AK-ISK/PT/VIII/2021), which as a whole has exceeded the National Higher Education Standards in Indonesia.

== Logo ==
There are three colors in UII's symbol, which are:

- Blue means determination or trustworthiness. It means that UII will create trusted and wise graduates.
- Yellowish gold means an expectation and a symbol of education. It means that UII will engender graduates expected by the nation who will maintain and spread knowledge through Islamic education.
- White means sincere, honest, and persevering. It means that the graduates UII produces are those who are honest and loyal to the country and nation, and persistent and faithful to Allah the Almighty, in line with Islamic teachings and pleas.

The meaning of the logo of the Universitas Islam Indonesia is:

- The shield shape means endurance and resistance. It means that UII will sustain the name as one of the universities able to produce good graduates.
- The middle shape distilir as a mosque dome. It symbolizes that Indonesian culture is in line with Islamic values.
- The five-petal flower can mean Pancasila, which can mean the five pillars of Islam.
- The pistil forms a trisula. It symbolizes the Tri Dharma Perguruan Tinggi (the three basic goals of higher education).
- The tip of the trisula which looks like a pen is a symbol of education.
- The middle sepal is a picture of a book which is Al-Qur'an.
- The lowest part of the sepal is two crutches. They symbolize two Islamic creeds (syahadat). The symbols in the middle as a whole exemplify the goal of UII which is based on Islamic values and Pancasila.
- The shape of a pyramidal ship is the door of a mosque below the petal is meant to be the Islamic culture.

== Facilities and infrastructure ==
=== Central Library ===
The Central Library has a collection of more than 250,000 books and consists of circulated books from faculties in integrated campus, in Kaliurang Road, Yogyakarta.

=== Ulil Albab Mosque ===
The mosque is the main building at the heart of the campus.

=== Kahar Muzakir Auditorium ===
The auditorium is a multifunctional building that students and the community can use.

=== Jogja International Hospital or Rumah Sakit JIH ===
The hospital is one of Waqf Foundation of Universitas Islam Indonesia. It is available to the public.

=== Apotek Polifarma ===
The apothecary provides health facilities for students and surrounding communities. Medical services by doctors are provided at certain hours.

=== Public Lecture Building ===
The Public Lecture Building was built for the large room lectures, national seminars, and other activities. The building is named after Prof. Dr. dr. M. Sardjito, MD, MPH, who served as UII Rector between 1963–1970.

=== UII Career Center ===
The UII Career Center is a unit under Direktorat Pemasaran, Kerja Sama, dan Alumni (DPKA) Field III of Universitas Islam Indonesia. UII Career Center was established on 12 May 2003. Since 2006 UII Career Center is inaugurated by Minister of Manpower and Transmigration Republic of Indonesia as special job fair of Department of Manpower and Transmigration, Daerah Istimewa Yogyakarta.

=== Sports Arena ===
The Sports Arena, commonly known as GOR, is a sports facility owned by Universitas Islam Indonesia (UII). The building has a capacity of approximately 600 people and includes one basketball court and three badminton courts. The facilities are available for use by UII students and the general public.

=== Student Convention Center ===
Located at the university's heart, the Student Convention Center was first approved for construction between 1990 and 1992 with the purchase of more land. This purchase was overseen by the Head of the Student Council's External Affairs Division, Andi Achmad Yusuf.

=== Students Housing Facilities ===
The Students Housing Facilities, or Rusunawa, was built using a Ministry of Housing grant in 2007. This Rusunawa has a capacity of 300 students who are temporarily reserved for student activities.

=== Center for International Language and Cultural Studies (CILACS) ===
The CILACS is language training center and cultural studies under Universitas Islam Indonesia. It plays a role in the improvement of language skills.

=== Unisi 104.75 FM ===
Unisi 104.75 FM is one of earliest radio broadcasts in universities in Yogyakarta.

=== Cyberspace Internet café ===
The Cyberspace Internet café is located in the Basement of the Rectorate Building in the integrated campus area. In this facility, students can request access to integrated hotspots.

== Faculties and programmes ==
Out of the 25 study programmes currently available at UII, over 70% have obtained "A" accreditation for their study programs. Furthermore, among the recent accomplishments, there are currently 17 UII study programs that have received "Unggul" accreditation.

| Faculty | Program |
|---|---|
| Faculty of Business and Economics | Management; Accounting; Economics; Master of Management; Master of Accounting; Master of Management; Master of Economics and Finance; PhD in Economics; Diploma in Accounting; Diploma in Corporate Management; Diploma in Finance and Banking |
| Faculty of Law | Law; Legal Advocate Profession; Master of Law; Master of Notaries; PhD in Law |
| Faculty of Islamic Science | Islamic Education; Islamic Law; Islamic Economics; Master of Islamic Education; PhD in Islamic Law |
| Faculty of Medicine | Medical Doctor; Medical Profession |
| Faculty of Mathematics and Natural Sciences | Statistics; Chemistry; Chemistry Education; Pharmacy; Pharmacist Profession; Diploma in Analytical Chemistry |
| Faculty of Psychology and Socio-Cultural Sciences | Psychology; Master of Psychology; Psychologist Profession; Communication; International Relations; English Language Education |
| Faculty of Civil Engineering and Planning | Civil Engineering; Architecture; Environmental Engineering; Master of Civil Engineering; Master of Architecture; Architect Profession; PhD in Civil Engineering |
| Faculty of Industrial Technology | Chemical Engineering; Industrial Engineering; Informatics; Electrical Engineering; Mechanical Engineering; Textile Engineering; Master of Industrial Engineering; Master of Informatics |
| International Program | Industrial Engineering; Business and Economics; Law; Communication; International Relations; Accounting; Civil Engineering; Architecture; Economics; Ahwal Syakhshiyah |

== Partnerships and collaboration ==
With long-term plans towards a world-class university, UII has collaborated with other institutions.

Academic collaborations have been conducted with universities, local and overseas. This has taken the form of student and staff exchange, joint research and internship programs. The student and staff exchange, along with joint research, has been conducted with Universiti Tunku Abdul Rahman, Woosong University of Korea, Hokkaido University, Wollongong University, Hannseidel Foundation, Universitas Bina Nusantara, George Mason University, and the University of Hawaiʻi at Mānoa to name but a few.

UII has been working with International Internships in Australia to facilitate students from Australia to experience a working environment in Indonesia. The students come from Monash University, Sunshine Coast University, Macquarie University and Deakin University, among others.

UII has an agreement with the Australian Consortium for In Country Indonesian (ACICIS) which help students from Australia to take program courses in Indonesia. The collaboration covers the area of development in thought, such as the collaboration with International Institute of Islamic Thought on Epistemology.

UII has worked with other institutions to enhance its application of academic programs developed in the university. The institutions include national private and government institutions, both local and from overseas.

== Dress code ==
In 2001 the university began requiring female students to wear the jilbab (hijab headcovering); before that students had the choice of whether or not to wear it. In March 2005 the university added requirements detailing four acceptable styles of hijab. According to Eve Warburton of Inside Indonesia, opinion on staff and students was divided, and some professors stated that they did not wish to enforce it.

== See also ==
- List of Islamic educational institutions
