= Constitutional Court of Indonesia =

One of two national apex courts

Constitutional Court of the Republic of Indonesia
- Mahkamah Konstitusi Republik Indonesia
- Seal of the Constitutional Court of Indonesia

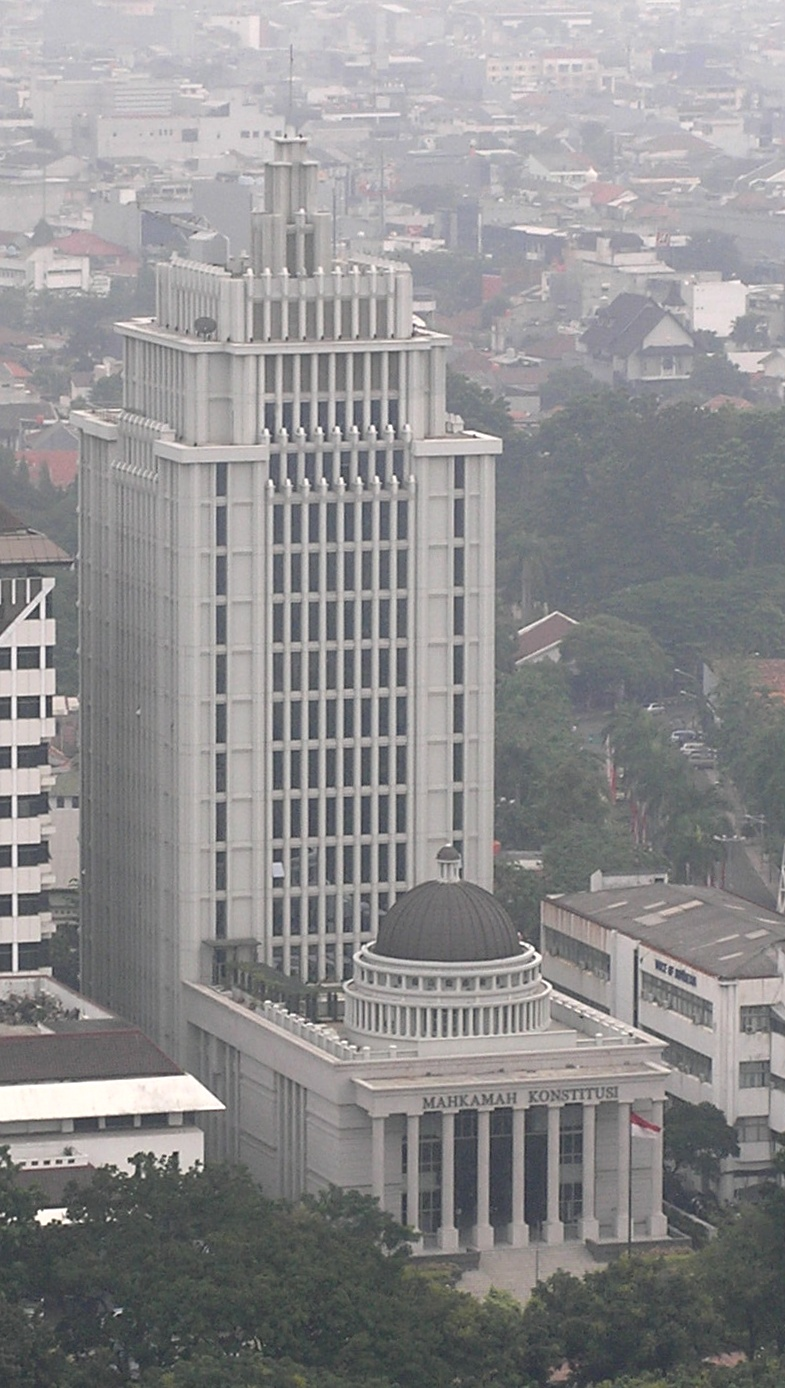
- The Constitutional Court building in Jakarta
- Interactive map of Constitutional Court of the Republic of Indonesia
- Established: 13 August 2003
- Location: Jakarta, Indonesia
- Composition method: 3 nominated by DPR, 3 by the President, 3 by the Supreme Court, and Presidential appointment.
- Authorised by: Constitution of Indonesia
- Judge term length: Fifteen years
- Number of positions: 9
- Website: mkri.id

Chief Justice of the Constitutional Court of Indonesia
- Currently: Suhartoyo
- Since: 13 November 2023

The Constitutional Court of the Republic of Indonesia (Indonesian: Mahkamah Konstitusi Republik Indonesia, MKRI or MK) is one of the apex courts in Indonesia along with the Indonesian Supreme Court. Its primary role is reviewing the constitutionality of Acts (undang-undang). It also has other functions, including resolving disputes over the powers of state institutions, settling disputes over the results of general elections, deciding on the dissolution of political parties, and supervising impeachment. The last two functions have never been exercised by the Court.

The Indonesian Constitutional Court was established as a consequence of the third amendment to the Constitution of Indonesia, ratified by the People's Consultative Assembly on 9 November 2001. Between the adoption of the third Constitutional amendment and the establishment of the Constitutional Court, the duties of the Constitutional Court were carried out by the Indonesian Supreme Court.

The Court is the seat of the Permanent Secretariat for Planning and Coordination of the Association of Asian Constitutional Courts and Equivalent Institutions.

== History ==
In August 2003, the People's Consultative Assembly passed the Constitutional Court Act (Law No 24 of 2003) and the nine justices were appointed on 15 August. They were sworn in the following day. On 15 October 2003, the Supreme Court handed over authority, marking the start of the Constitutional Court's activities. The nine founding judges were:

- Prof. Dr. Jimly Asshiddiqie from the University of Indonesia
- Dr. Harjono from Airlangga University, Surabaya
- I Dewa Gede Palguna from Udayana University, Denpasar
- Prof. Dr. Mohammad Laica Marzuki, a former judge of the Supreme Court
- Maruarar Siahaan, former chairman of the High Court of Bengkulu
- Soedarsono, former chairman of the Administrative High Court of Surabaya
- Prof. Abdul Mukthie Fadjar from Brawijaya University, Malang
- Prof. Ahmad Natabaya from Sriwijaya University, Palembang
- Lieutenant General (Retired) Achmad Roestandi.

For the first time, a prominent scholar who was actively involved in the process of discussing amendments to the Indonesian constitution and with the introduction of the idea of the constitutional court, Prof. Dr Jimly Asshiddiqie was elected the first chief judge (2003–2006). With the successful completion of his first period on the court, he was then re-elected as the chief judge for a second term of 2006–2009. He resigned from the court after finishing his first five-year term of office. After the completion of this first five years period, the Constitutional Court has been considered one of the icon of Indonesian reform success story, together with the Anti Corruption Eradication Commission. The leadership of the court continued under Prof. Dr Mohammad Mahfud, a senior politician of National Awakening Party and member of parliament.

The constitutional court has five jurisdictions:

- Constitutional review of legislation (law)
- Disputes about constitutional competence between state institutions
- Disputes about electoral results
- Dissolution of political parties
- Impeachment of the President or Vice President of Indonesia

With the establishment of the court, the aim is to safeguard democracy and the constitution according to the principle of rule of law, and the constitutional rights of the people and human rights can be protected accordingly. The high-profile performance of the constitutional court has made it a respected institution in Indonesia. During the general election and the first presidential election in 2004, the role taken by the constitutional court was widely appreciated by the people. Many landmark decisions have been made in the fields of politics, social, and economic law since its first year of establishment. The rehabilitation of the political rights of former members of communist party, the prohibition of retroactive law of anti-terrorism, the abolition of articles of subversive law and of defamation against presidential institution, etc., are among the landmark decisions which made it influential in guiding the new democracy of Indonesia. Public interest in the court has included discussion of the appointment processes of judges; the delineation of responsibilities between the Constitutional Court and other parts of the legal system; and overall approach that the Court has taken to the issues that it has considered.

In mid-2011 the Indonesian parliament approved certain changes to the 2003 Constitutional Court Law that established the Constitutional Court. The revisions approved include changes to the arrangements for the Court's ethics council, a strengthening of the qualifications and experience required for the appointment of justices, a reduction in the term of the Court's chair and deputy chair (to two-and-a-half years, down from three years), and raising the mandatory retirement age for justices from 67 to 70 years. The proposal to change the arrangements for the membership of the Court's ethics council was a controversial issue with the first chief judge of the court, Jimly Asshiddiqie, describing the planned changes as "frivolous."

In October 2013, in a move designed to improve the standards of appointment of justices to the Court following the arrest of the then-chief justice Akil Mochtar, president Susilo Bambang Yudhoyono issued a regulation-in-lieu-of-law (known as a Peraturan Pemerintah Pengganti Undang-undang or Perppu). The Perppu set out new arrangements relating to the processes of selection of justices. Under the proposed arrangements, a Constitutional Court justice is not to have had links to a political party for at least seven years and would have to undergo screening by an independent selection panel. In addition, a permanent ethics committee was to be established to monitor the performance of the Court. On 19 December 2013 the Indonesian parliament endorsed the Perppu.

On 16 October 2023, in response to a petition filed by a student named Almas Tsaqib Birru Re A, the court amended the Election Law to allow people under 40 years old to stand for the presidency or vice-presidency if they had experience as regional leaders. This allowed President Jokowi's oldest son and mayor of Surakarta, 36-year-old Gibran Rakabuming Raka to contest the 2024 presidential election. This ruling attracted criticism because Chief Justice Anwar Usman is Jokowi's brother-in-law and Gibran's uncle. On 6 February 2024, Ganjar Pranowo stated in an interview that the Constitutional Court has committed an ethical violation together with the General Elections Commission due to being involved in an acceptance of the registration of Gibran Rakabuming Raka who was registered as a vice presidential candidate in participating in the election stages.

== Powers ==
The court has the same legal standing as the Supreme Court. Its powers, set out in article 24C of the Constitution, include the final say in reviewing laws concerning the Constitution, disputes over the authority of state institutions, the dissolution of political parties and disputes over election results. It also is obliged to rule on any attempt to impeach the president.

Its jurisdiction on the electoral disputes was first limited to the five-yearly general elections (such as the 2004 and 2009 general elections). However, since 2009 the definition of general election has been broadened and includes the election of governors and regency heads (bupati). To date, of the five jurisdictions of the court, most cases handled have centred around issues of judicial review, disputed electoral results, and disputes between state institutions. The Supreme Court continues to perform an informal judicial review function.

A major problem for the court, like other parts of the legal system in Indonesia, is enforcement of decisions. The ability of the court system in Indonesia to have decisions enforced is sometimes quite weak and in recent years across Indonesia local officials have, in some cases, refused to abide by important decisions of the Constitutional Court.

== Organization ==
=== Leadership ===
The Chief Justice and Deputy Chief Justice of the Constitutional Court of Indonesia is the highest- and second-highest ranking official serving on the Court. Both the Chief Justice and the Deputy Chief Justice are elected from among the nine sitting justices on the Court.

==== Justices ====
The Indonesian Constitution specifies that the Court must have nine justices. The People's Representantive Council, the President, and the Supreme Court are each entitled to appoint three justices. Under the Constitutional Court Law revision in 2020, justices are to hold their position for 15 years until they reach 70 years of age. In terms of the current justices, the law provides that they will retire when they have ended their 15-year term or they have reached the age of 70. Currently, the sitting justices of the Court are as follow.

Current Justices of the Constitutional Court of Indonesia
#	Justices		Position	Nominator
#	Portrait	Name	Position	Nominator
1	Chief of Constitutional Court of Indonesia	Suhartoyo	Chief Justice since 9 November 2023	Supreme Court
2		Saldi Isra	Deputy Chief Justice since 15 March 2023	President
3		Enny Nurbaningsih	Justice	President
4		Daniel Yusmic Pancastaki Foekh	Justice	President
5		M. Guntur Hamzah	Justice	People's Representative Council
6		Ridwan Mansyur	Justice	Supreme Court
7		Arsul Sani	Justice	People's Representative Council
8		Adies Kadir	Justice	People's Representative Council
9		Liliek Prisbawono Adi	Justice	Supreme Court

=== Secretariat General ===
The Secretariat General of the Constitutional Court (Indonesian: Sekretariat Jenderal Mahkamah Konstitusi) is the office responsible for technical, non-judicial administration of the court, and is headed by a Secretary General. The Secretary General is responsible for:

- Bureau of Planning and Supervision (Biro Perencanaan dan Pengawasan)
- Bureau of Finance and Human Resources (Biro Keuangan dan Kepegawaian)
- Bureau of Public Relation and Protocols (Biro Hubungan Masyarakat dan Protokol)
- Bureau of General Affairs (Biro Umum)
- Center for Research and Dispute Analysis, Information and Communication Technology Management (Pusat Penelitian dan Pengkajian Perkara, Pengelolaan Teknologi Informasi dan Komunikasi)
- Center for Pancasila and Constitutional Education (Pusat Pendidikan Pancasila dan Konstitusi)

=== Clerk Office ===
The Constitutional Court Clerk Office (Indonesian: Kepaniteraan Mahkamah Konstitusi) is responsible for judicial administration of the Court, and is headed by a Chief Clerk. The Chief Clerk is assisted by two Deputy Clerks, with Deputy Clerk I responsible for constitutional reviews, disputes between state institution, and legislative and presidential election disputes. Junior Court Clerk II is responsible for adjudication on impeachments, adjudication on dissolutions of political parties and on local electoral disputes.

== See also ==
- Constitution
- Constitutionalism
- Constitutional economics
- Jurisprudence
- Judiciary
- Rule of law
- Rule According to Higher Law
- Supreme Court of Indonesia
- Association of Asian Constitutional Courts and Equivalent Institutions
