= Pornography Act (Indonesia) =

2008 legislation in Indonesia

House of Representatives
- Long title: Act No. 44/2008 on Pornography (Undang-Undang Nomor 44 Tahun 2008 tentang Pornografi)
- Citation: LN 2008/No. 181; TLN No. 4928
- Territorial extent: Indonesia
- Passed by: House of Representatives
- Passed: 30 October 2008
- Signed by: Susilo Bambang Yudhoyono
- Signed: 26 November 2008
- Commenced: 26 November 2008

Amended by
- Criminal Code Act 2023 (art. 29)

Keywords
- Pornography, obscenity
- Status: Amended

The Pornography Act (Indonesian: Undang-Undang Pornografi), officially Act No. 44 of 2008 on Pornography (Undang-Undang Nomor 44 Tahun 2008 tentang Pornografi), is a law in Indonesia that regulates the production, distribution, and use of pornographic material. It is one of the most debated pieces of legislation in the country's post-Reform era legal landscape.

It was first tabled on 14 February 2006 as the Anti-Pornography and Pornoaction Bill (Rancangan Undang-Undang Anti-Pornografi dan Pornoaksi or RUU APP) by the Prosperous Justice Party (PKS), supported by other Islamic-oriented parties, groups, and conservative legislators. The bill was passed on 30 October 2008 by the House of Representatives (DPR), and was signed into law on 26 November 2008 by President Susilo Bambang Yudhoyono. It defines pornography broadly to include visual, written, and audio content deemed obscene or sexually explicit. It prohibits activities such as producing, distributing, or publicly displaying pornographic material, with heavier penalties for involving children. Its passage sparked widespread public debate, with critics warning that the law threatens freedom of expression, women's rights, and Indonesia's cultural diversity, while supporters framed it as a measure to uphold public morality and protect children. Despite multiple constitutional challenges, the law remains in force and continues to influence debates over morality, pluralism, and legal regulation in Indonesia.

== Background ==
Following the fall of President Suharto in 1998, Indonesia experienced a new era of greater press freedom and more open political debate. This liberalization coincided with increased availability of sexually explicit material, including inexpensive video compact discs, tabloid publications, and late-night television programming. In 2001, the Indonesian Ulema Council (Majelis Ulama Indonesia, or MUI), issued a fatwa against what it referred to as "pornoaksi" (literally meaning "pornoaction" or pornographic acts). Public controversies, such as the performances of dangdut singer Inul Daratista and the launch of a local edition of Playboy magazine in 2006, were cited by supporters as evidence of declining morality.

Before the enactment of the law, Indonesia lacked a single comprehensive statute specifically regulating pornography. Instead, provisions concerning morality and obscenity were dispersed across various sectoral laws. The Indonesian Penal Code (KUHP), for instance, prohibits the distribution or public display of writings, images, or objects deemed contrary to decency under Articles 281–283, although these provisions were often considered inadequately enforced. Likewise, the 2002 Broadcasting Act prohibits the broadcasting of content depicting obscenity, violence, gambling, or narcotics abuse and prescribes criminal sanctions for violations.

== Legislative history ==
=== Political developments ===
Efforts to formulate legislation specifically concerning pornography in Indonesia date back to the late 1990s, during the successive administrations that followed the fall of Suharto's New Order regime. The Ministry of Women's Empowerment initiated a draft under President B. J. Habibie, while the Ministry of Religious Affairs pursued similar efforts during the presidency of Abdurrahman Wahid, partly influenced by lobbying from MUI. Former Minister of Women's Empowerment during the New Order, Sulasikin Murpratomo, also prepared a draft. Around the same time, staff at the University of Indonesia's Faculty of Law produced their own version of the bill, which circulated informally and reached DPR Commission VII, responsible for religion and women's affairs. Alongside the draft from the Ministry of Religious Affairs, it served as a reference for legislators when shaping the first parliamentary version of the bill.

In the years following the regime's demise, the MUI refined the draft and urged its adoption by the DPR. On 23 June 2005, the leadership of Commission VIII of the DPR, chaired by Hanief Ismail from the National Awakening Party (F-PKB) caucus, sent a letter to the DPR leadership proposing a draft titled Anti-Pornography and Pornoaction Bill. Coined by conservative lawmakers in the DPR, "pornoaction" denotes behavior viewed as pornographic or indecent. The letter outlined three main reasons for the proposal: the increasing spread of pornography through advances in communication technology; the right of Indonesia's religious society to protect moral values and participate in preventing immoral acts; and the need for legal certainty based on religious and cultural norms to regulate the production and dissemination of pornographic material.

The proposal received a positive response. In a plenary session on 27 September 2005, the DPR approved the formation of a Special Committee (Panitia Khusus, or the Pansus) chaired by Balkan Kaplale from the Democratic Party (F-Demokrat) caucus, with Yoyoh Yusroh from the Prosperous Justice Party (F-PKS) caucus as its deputy chair. It consisted of 50 members from nine parliamentary caucuses, including Golkar, Indonesian Democratic Party of Struggle (PDI-P), United Development Party PPP), Democratic Party, National Mandate Party (PAN), the National Awakening Party (PKB), Prosperous Justice Party (PKS), the Regional Unity caucus (F-PD), and the Reform Star Party (PBR). The bill subsequently became the subject of widespread public discussion during 2005–2006.

Between October 2005 and July 2007, the Pansus held a series of meetings and public hearings (Rapat Dengar Pendapat Umum, RDPU) to gather input from various groups. Hearings were held in several provinces, including South Kalimantan, South Sulawesi, North Maluku, Jakarta, Bali, North Sulawesi, and the Special Region of Yogyakarta. Participants included religious organizations, artists, legal experts, educators, and youth organizations. One of the earliest hearings, held on 18 January 2006, brought together representatives from the Forum Umat Islam (FUI), the Persatuan Artis Musik Melayu Indonesia (PAMMI) led by Rhoma Irama, and artists such as Inul Daratista, Anisa Bahar, and Titiek Puspa. Subsequent hearings on 25 and 26 January 2006 involved scholars and experts including Boyke Dian Nugraha, Naek L. Tobing, and Seto Mulyadi, as well as student and youth organizations such as Union of Catholic University Students of the Republic of Indonesia (PMKRI), Indonesian National Student Movement (GMNI), Muslim Students' Association (HMI), Indonesian Christian Student Movement (GMKI), Indonesian Youth National Committee (KNPI), and Indonesian Islamic Student Movement (PMII). In February 2006, the PKS, supported by several other parties, presented the proposal as a way to uphold Islamic moral standards, contending that pornography was incompatible with Eastern cultural values (budaya ketimuran) and that the law would protect younger generations from moral decline.

After completing a series of deliberations, the Pansus held a plenary meeting on 18 July 2007 that approved the draft as a House-initiated bill. During this stage, the title was changed from Anti-Pornography and Pornoaction Bill to Pornography Bill. On the same day, the Pansus submitted the draft and its academic paper to the DPR leadership for forwarding to the President and the Regional Representative Council (DPD), in accordance with Article 22D(2) of the 1945 Constitution. The DPR then transmitted the bill to the President through a letter dated 24 August 2007 (No. RU.02/6632/DPR-RI/2007), requesting joint deliberation. The President replied on 20 September 2007 (Letter No. R-54/Pres/09/2007), appointing the Minister of Religious Affairs, the Minister of Communication and Information, and the Minister of Law and Human Rights as government representatives. A subsequent letter from the Minister of State Secretariat on 8 October 2007 (No. B-552/M.Sesneg/D-4/10/2007) added the Minister of State for Women's Empowerment to the delegation.

=== Parliamentary deliberations ===
During the first-level deliberation, the F-PDIP and F-PDS opposed the bill, arguing that it was divisive and procedurally flawed. They noted that the government and the Pansus had failed to consult regional leaders and disseminate the revised draft as required. Both factions ultimately walked out of the plenary session in protest. Eight other caucuses (the F-PG, F-PP, F-PD, F-PAN, F-PKB, F-BPD, F-PBR, and F-PKS) supported ratification.

Supporters argued that pornography had become widespread and harmful to social morals, and that the bill had strong legal foundations under the principles of lex specialis, meaning it would complement and supersede earlier laws such as the Penal Code and the Broadcasting Act. Opponents objected to several controversial articles, particularly those defining "pornoaction" and granting the public broad authority to monitor and prevent pornography, which they feared could lead to vigilantism and horizontal conflict. They also criticized Article 4 for containing explicit descriptions of sexual acts and for classifying homosexuality as "deviant," contrary to positions held by the Ministry of Health and the World Health Organization (WHO).

In its final statement, the government—represented by Minister of Religious Affairs Muhammad Maftuh Basyuni—argued that the existing legislations did not yet comprehensively regulate the eradication of pornography. The new law was therefore intended to fill that legal gap and strengthen preventive measures.

== Content ==
The first page of the law in Indonesian language.

The law defines and regulates acts related to the creation, distribution, and use of pornographic materials in Indonesia. It applies throughout the territory of the country and is intended to uphold public morality and social norms of decency.

=== Definition and scope ===
The law defines pornography as pictures, sketches, illustrations, photographs, writings, sounds, moving pictures, animations, cartoons, lyrics, body movements, or other forms of messages conveyed through any medium of communication and/or public performance that contain obscenity or sexual exploitation in violation of prevailing moral norms. The definition is broad and includes materials in printed, electronic, and digital formats.

=== Prohibited acts ===
The law prohibits any person from producing, creating, multiplying, duplicating, reproducing, distributing, broadcasting, importing, exporting, offering, selling, renting, or otherwise providing pornographic products or services. It also forbids a person from intentionally becoming, or making another person become, an object or model in pornographic material, as well as from financing or facilitating such acts. Public performances or displays that depict nudity (erotic photography), sexual exploitation, sexual intercourse—including acts deemed deviant—masturbation, the exposure of genitals, or other conduct considered pornographic are likewise prohibited.

=== Provisions concerning children ===
The law contains specific prohibitions on the involvement of children in pornographic activities. It criminalises persuading, inducing, exploiting, permitting, or coercing a child to use or participate in pornographic products or services. Acts that involve children, or that depict minors in pornographic ways, are classified as aggravated offences and carry heavier penalties.

=== Exceptions and regulated activities ===
The law recognises limited circumstances in which certain depictions may be permitted, provided they are not intended for public distribution or commercial purposes. Activities that fall outside the explicit prohibitions must comply with implementing regulations issued by the government. Any permitted production or display of materials of an artistic, cultural, or scientific nature must be carried out in accordance with specific provisions established by law.

=== Sanctions ===
Violations of the law are punishable by imprisonment and fines. Offences involving the production or distribution of pornographic materials may result in imprisonment for a minimum of six months and up to twelve years, and/or fines ranging from two hundred fifty million to six billion rupiah. Other violations, such as participation in prohibited performances or facilitation of pornographic services, carry proportionate penalties as set forth in the relevant articles. When children are involved, the penalties are increased by up to one-third of the maximum sentence.

== Reception ==
Since the deliberation to its enactment in October 2008, the law generated widespread and polarized reactions across Indonesia. Supporters from a loose coalition of Islamic political parties and various conservative religious organizations, welcomed the law as a necessary measure to safeguard public morality, protect children, and uphold religious values. Government officials framed the legislation as consistent with Pancasila and national cultural identity, emphasizing its role in preventing the perceived social harms of pornography.

Opposition emerged from a broad coalition of civil society groups, cultural communities, and regional leaders. Critics argued that the law's definitions of pornography and indecency were overly broad and risked criminalizing traditional cultural expressions, such as Balinese temple dances and Papuan body painting. Women's rights organizations and human rights advocates warned that the law could be used to police private morality and disproportionately target women and artists. Several provincial governments, particularly in Bali, Papua, and North Sulawesi, voiced formal objections, describing the law as an imposition of conservative Islamic norms on Indonesia's plural society.

The law also faced political resistance in the DPR. Secular and nationalist parties criticized it as unconstitutional and contrary to freedom of expression, with some lawmakers staging walkouts during the final vote. In 2009, the law was challenged before the Constitutional Court (MK), which upheld its validity, ruling that it did not conflict with constitutional guarantees of cultural rights and freedom of expression.

== See also ==
- Pornography laws by region
- Legality of child pornography
- Legal status of internet pornography
- Internet censorship in Indonesia
