= Law of Indonesia =

The law of Indonesia is based on a civil law system, intermixed with local customary law and Dutch law. Before European presence and colonization began in the sixteenth century, indigenous kingdoms ruled the archipelago independently with their own custom laws, known as adat (unwritten, traditional rules still observed in the Indonesian society). Foreign influences from India, China and the Middle East have not only affected culture, but also the customary adat laws. The people of Aceh in Sumatra, for instance, observe their own sharia law, while ethnic groups like the Toraja in Sulawesi still follow their animistic customary law.

Dutch presence and subsequent colonization of Indonesia for over three centuries has left a legacy of Dutch colonial law, largely in the Indonesian civil code and criminal code. Following independence in 1945, Indonesia began to form its own modern Indonesian law, modifying existing precepts. Dutch legal decisions maintain some authority in Indonesia through application of the concordance principle. The three components of adat, or customary law; Dutch law; and modern Indonesian law co-exist in the current law of Indonesia.

== Hierarchy of legislations ==
Indonesian legislation comes in different forms. The following official hierarchy of Indonesian legislations (from top to bottom) is enumerated in Article 7 of Law No. 12/2011:

1. The 1945 Constitution (Undang-Undang Dasar Negara Republik Indonesia Tahun 1945 or UUD 1945);
2. Resolutions of the People's Consultative Assembly (Ketetapan Majelis Permusyawaratan Rakyat or Tap MPR);
3. Acts (Undang-Undang or UU, also translated as Laws) and Government Regulations in-lieu-of Acts (Peraturan Pemerintah Pengganti Undang-Undang or Perppu);
4. Government regulations (Peraturan Pemerintah or PP);
5. Presidential regulations (Peraturan Presiden or Perpres);
6. Provincial regulations (Peraturan Daerah Provinsi or Perda Provinsi); and
7. City regulations (Peraturan Daerah Kota or Perda Kota) and Regency regulations (Peraturan Daerah Kabupaten or Perda Kabupaten).

In practice, there are also presidential decrees (Keputusan Presiden or Keppres), presidential instructions (Instruksi Presiden or Inpres), ministerial regulations (Peraturan Menteri or Permen), ministerial decrees (Keputusan Menteri or Kepmen), all of which are legally binding and sometimes in conflict with each other.

Once a legislation is promulgated, a State Gazette of the Republic of Indonesia (Lembaran Negara Republik Indonesia) is issued by State Secretariat. Sometimes elucidation of the legislation (Penjelasan) or attached documents like charts accompany the main legislation in a State Gazette Supplement (Tambahan Lembaran Negara Republik Indonesia). The Government also produces State Reports (Berita Negara, lit. 'State News') to publish government and public notices as well as other ministerial regulations and decrees.

=== The 1945 Constitution ===
The 1945 Constitution is the highest legal instrument in Indonesia, to which the executive, legislative and judicial branches of government must defer. The constitution was written in July and August 1945, when Indonesia was emerging from Japanese occupation toward the end of World War II. It was replaced by the 1949 Federal Constitution and the 1950 Provisional Constitution, but was restored after President Sukarno decreed its reintroduction as the Constitution of Indonesia on 5 July 1959. However, constitutional deviations grew rapidly during Sukarno Administration.

The 32 years of Suharto Administration ended any practice of constitutional deviations exercised under Sukarno (i.e. empowering Sukarno to rule as President-for-Life, as well as allowing the president to appoint or dismiss members of the legislature at will). However, the constitution would never been amended either. In contrast to Sukarno's volatile administration, Suharto refused to countenance any changes to the constitution and the People's Consultative Assembly (Majelis Permusyawaratan Rakyat) passed a resolution in 1985 requiring a national referendum for any constitutional amendments.

After the Suharto's fall in 1998, the MPR amended the constitution four times between 1999 and 2002. Important amendments include a direct presidential election by the people, as well as limiting presidential term of office to only two-term five years each; The previous clauses in the Constitution of which had made it possible for Suharto's administration to stay in power for more than five terms. After the final amendment in 2002, the People's Representative Council (Dewan Perwakilan Rakyat or DPR, the lower house) gained more power of oversight over the executive branch, the Regional Representatives Council (Dewan Perwakilan Daerah or DPD, the upper house) was established, regional government and regional autonomy was recognized, and an expanded section about civil and human rights among other changes.

As of the fourth amendment in 2002, the constitution consists of 26 chapters and 37 articles.

=== Resolutions of the People's Consultative Assembly ===
Resolution of the People's Consultative Assembly (Ketetapan Majelis Permusyawaratan Rakyat) or Tap MPR in short is issued by the People's Consultative Assembly (Majelis Permusyawaratan Rakyat, or MPR, the bicameral legislature of Indonesia), with legal binding power directly below the Constitution. Under the original, unamended 1945 Constitution, MPR is the highest state institution in Indonesia, with the sole power to exercise popular sovereignty, amend the Constitution, vote and elect the president, and enact a Broad Guidelines of State Policy (Garis-Garis Besar Haluan Negara). Thus, Tap MPR (despite not directly mentioned as a power of the MPR) is used to guide national and government policy, and its use was promoted during Suharto administration.

After the fall of Suharto from power, MPR amended the constitution, and ceased to issue any further Resolutions. In a final Tap MPR enacted in 2003, MPR confirmed the binding power of some Resolutions (such as the Resolution to ban the Marxist–Leninist ideology) and declared the rest as completely or partially devoid of legal powers. Previously in 2000, MPR included the Resolutions in the official hierarchy of Indonesian legislations, but removed it in a 2004 Legislation Act. Finally in 2011 an amended Legislation Act was enacted, reintroducing the Tap MPR into the official hierarchy of Indonesian legislations, but not confirming MPR power to issue further resolutions.

=== Acts and government regulations in-lieu-of acts ===
Acts or laws (Undang-Undang or UU) can only be enacted by the DPR with the president's assent. The president, DPR, and DPD can propose a bill of law (Rancangan Undang-Undang or RUU) to be deliberated by the DPR. During the process of drafting and deliberating a bill, DPR forms a small task group to discuss the proposed legislation with the relevant government institutions and various stakeholders. When agreement has been reached and the DPR has approved the bill, the president signs the bill and it is enshrined into law as an act. However, if the president refuses to sign the bill approved by DPR, the bill will automatically be enacted within thirty days and is promulgated. When agreement cannot be reached within DPR to enact a bill into law, the bill may not be proposed again during the current DPR session.

The president are also authorized to promulgate a Government Regulations in-lieu-of Acts (Peraturan Pemerintah Pengganti Undang-Undang or Perppu in short) by the Constitution. There are several reason why the president might issue a Perppu:

- An emergency situation has arisen, in which an act (or revision of an act) is required, but deliberation process in the DPR may take too long;
- A legal vacuum has happened or legal loopholes has been discovered due to lack of sufficient Acts regarding the subject;
- Certain matters is not sufficiently covered under existing Acts.

However, after promulgation by the president, Perppu must be submitted to DPR for approval during the immediate DPR session (regular or extraordinary). If approved, Perppu will be enacted into an act. If not approved, said Perppu will be devoid of any legal power, and the president must submit a bill to repeal the Perppu. But during the time period between promulgation by the president and approval by DPR, Perppu is still a legally binding legislation with the same power as a proper Act.

=== Government regulations ===
Government regulations (Peraturan Pemerintah or PP) are issued by the president in the name of the Government to execute an act into proper government policies and regulations.

=== Presidential regulations ===
Presidential regulations (Peraturan Presiden or Perpres) are issued by the president to execute an act and its government regulation into sets of a more flexible and matter-specific policies and regulations, usually to be further executed by relevant institutions, ministries, and agency.

=== Provincial, city, and regency ordinances ===
Under current Indonesian administrative subdivisions, Indonesia is divided into 38 provinces (Provinsi) headed by a governor (Gubernur). Each provinces is then subdivided into the urban cities (Kota) headed by a mayor (Walikota), and the rural regencies (Kabupaten) headed by a regent (Bupati). Each of the provinces, cities, and regencies also have their own legislatures, called the Regional People's Representative Council (Dewan Perwakilan Rakyat Daerah or DPRD). There are further administrative subdivisions below the cities and regencies, but they do not issue legislations. Several regions may use different nomenclatures for their subdivisions, but are principally still the same.

Ordinances or regional regulations (Peraturan Daerah or Perda) are sets of legislations issued by the regional government applicable under their respective jurisdictions: provincial ordinances (Peraturan Daerah Provinsi or Perda Provinsi) issued by the Provincial DPRD, city ordinances (Peraturan Daerah Kota or Perda Kota) issued by the city DPRD, and regency ordinances (Peraturan Daerah Kabupaten or Perda Kabupaten) issued by the regency DPRD. The provincial ordinances is higher in rank than the city and regency ordinances, though sometimes legislations passed on the national level allowed them to be directly executed with city and regency ordinances, bypassing the issuance of provincial ordinances.

The ordinances regulated specific matters pertaining regional autonomy, facilitation of local situations, and executions of legislations of higher level than the ordinances. The governors, mayors, and regents may issue their own regulations, decrees, and instructions to further execute and specified matters of the ordinances into applicable policies.

Similarly with the case in national-level Acts lawmaking procedures, the DPRDs and the regional heads of government can propose bills of law to be deliberated in the DPRD. If an agreement has been reached, the regional heads of government will sign the bill into an ordinance, then the bill will automatically enacted into an ordinance within thirty days.

== Sources of laws ==
=== Written laws ===
As Indonesia is considered to prescribe to civil law system, the legal system is heavily reliant on statutory laws. Generally, all legislations explicitly mentioned in the official hierarchy of Indonesian laws (the hierarchy of legislations mentioned above) is legally binding and applicable as a source of law. Other legally binding legislations not included in the official hierarchy may be mentioned in the attached elucidation of the 2011 Lawmaking Act. Treaties ratified into an act also serve as a source of law.

Under Article 2 of the transitory provisions in the Constitution, all legislations and institutions made under Dutch colonial law will remain in place and in force, until new legislations and institutions are made to replace them. Legislations such as the Algemene Bepalingen are still in force (albeit with articles repealed with new legislations), and institutions such as the civil registry still operates to this day.

=== Unwritten laws ===
The term "Unwritten Laws" refers to laws not promulgated through official authority. There are concerns that Indonesian legal system grew increasingly positivist and overregulated, pushing the unwritten laws to irrelevance.

==== Conventions ====
Conventions or customary norms are rules that was followed by official authority and considered an applicable law, even though it was not enacted through any official means. These conventions are usually rules which are conducted and abided by society in a similar situation, all while a legal belief must exist that said rules are binding as law (Opinio juris sive necessitatis).

In Indonesia, a sets of constitutional conventions (Konvensi Ketatanegaraan) existed and observed by academics and lawmakers. Most of the conventions are now set into law as statutes.

Examples of observed constitutional conventions in Indonesia
#	Conventions	Current status	Notes
1	Annual flag ceremony observed during the Indonesian independence day on 17 August	Formalized into Act	Act No. 24/2009 on Flags, Language, National Symbols, and Anthems Act No. 9/2010 on Protocols
2	Annual Presidential Address to the MPR on 16 August	Formalized into Act	Act No. 17/2014 on the Legislatures, last amended with Act No. 13/2019
3	Presidential appointment of Constitutional Judges	Formalized into Act	Act No. 24/2003 on Constitutional Court, last amended with Act No.7/2020
4	Hanging official pictures of the president and the vice president in government offices	Formalized into Act	Act No. 24/2009 on Flags, Language, National Symbols, and Anthems
5	Sole presidential power to grant pardon, rehabilitation, amnesty, and abolition	Constitutional amendment to include formal opinions from DPR and MA prior to granting the powers	Article 14 of the Constitution after amendment
6	Hundred Days program by the government	Not Formalized	
7	President's decision not to inaugurate an incumbent Attorney General	Formalized into Act, incumbent Attorney General (and all other incumbent officials) must be re-inaugurated after completing their previous term	Act No. 16/2004 on Public Prosecution Service
8	Presidential Address to introduce the draft for National Budget to the DPR	Not Formalized	
9	MPR voting and decision-making mechanisms	Not Formalized, MPR no longer have any decision-making powers except on presidential removal from power	
10	Vice-presidential authority relating to authorities delegated from the president	Not Formalized	
11	Rules on the limits of president's delegation of authority to the vice president	Not Formalized	

==== Adat laws ====
Adat laws are a set of written, traditional rules still observed in Indonesian society. It usually involves sets of laws, code of conducts, and dispute resolution mechanisms. Instead on relying on written codes, the observance and enforcement of adat laws involve elder member of the society as well as their collective will and awareness.

No single, unified adat laws apply for the whole Indonesian society; Every ethnic groups have their own sets of adat laws. The case of Papua exemplifies how adat laws not only vary between ethnic groups but also intersect significantly with state policies such as special autonomy. In Papua, customary criminal law continues to play a role in community dispute resolution, especially in remote areas, despite being outside the formal national criminal law framework. The implementation of special autonomy has partially acknowledged these legal traditions as part of regional governance, although challenges in harmonization and recognition remain.

It is similar to how conventions work, with the addition of an evolutionary characteristic of adat laws. For example, adat laws observed in Minang society of west Sumatran highlands initially ascribed toward worship of ancestors, as well as Hindu-Buddhist faith. After Islam was adopted as an integral faith within the Minang people, Islamic values began to be inserted into the adat laws of Minang people, without completely abolishing the existing values.

==== Principles of Sharia Law ====
Sharia Law as a whole is not considered to be part of Indonesian unwritten laws. However, a deep influence of Islam existed on how to approach Indonesian laws, and aspects of Sharia Law is applicable on certain aspects of Indonesian Muslims' livelihood. Initial major presence of Islam in Indonesian laws existed in the form of marriage and inheritance laws for Muslims. Its rules is directly applied in the Religious Court, and currently an official compilation of applicable marriage and inheritance laws existed and later adopted as a statute, in the form of Presidential Instruction No. 1/1991 on the Introduction of Islamic Law Compilation.

Later, a 2006 amendment for the 1989 Religious Court Act expanded the religious courts' authority to include hearing cases of Sharia economy disputes. Another one, a 1998 amendment for the 1992 Banking Act also distinguished conventional banking from Sharia banking.

A major change happen under the Act of Aceh Governance No. 11/2006, which acknowledged Aceh's special status within Indonesia. The Act allows for the widespread application of Sharia laws in the local governance of Aceh, includes education, economy, and judicial system. A special nomenclature of Ordinance, the Qanun, is used for Aceh legislations. Sharia criminal law is applicable in Aceh.

==== Legal doctrines ====
Secondary source materials on Indonesian laws may be used. Opinions, doctrines, and academic writings, such as books and law journals written by legal scholars and practitioners may usually be used in court for providing explanation and elucidation purpose. Recently, the use of online websites and databases may provide an alternative channel to look for references, which otherwise may be hard to search by conventional means.

==== Jurisprudences ====
Court decisions, case laws, or judge-made laws are not binding beyond the case and the parties; Stare decisis or precedents is not directly applicable in Indonesia, as is common with other civil law countries. However, decisions of the Supreme Court and the Constitutional Court, including the attached dissenting and concurring opinions, are considered to have persuasive force of precedence and are usually referred to at subsequent cases. Still, judges are not bound to apply previous decisions, and will mainly use the facts presented to the court to reach a decision.

== Criminal laws ==
Main sources of law for Indonesian criminal law come from the criminal code (Kitab Undang-Undang Hukum Pidana) and the criminal procedural code (Kitab Undang-Undang Hukum Acara Pidana). Other rules concerning a more specific subject on criminal actions may come from Acts and other regulations. The criminal code is a localized, translated version of Dutch colonial criminal code, the Nederlandsch-Indische Wetboek van Strafrecht which in turn was based on French Penal Code of 1810 and Wetboek van Strafrecht (Nederland). The criminal procedural code is post-colonial, enacted into law in 1981.

Under the previous pre-2023 Criminal Code, Indonesian criminal legal system recognized two types of criminal acts: the heavier crimes (Kejahatan or Misdrijven) and the lesser misdemeanors (Pelanggaran or Overtredingen). However this distinction is abolished with the new Criminal Code enacted in 2023.

=== Pre-2023 Criminal code ===
The pre-2023 Criminal Code (Staatsblad 1915:732, entered into force in 1918, adopted by independent Indonesia by Law No. 1/1946 to be applied in Java and Madura, and finally made applicable nationwide by Law No. 73/1958) is divided into three "Books". First Book deals with general provisions including extent of application, punishment, participation in punishable acts, filing of complaints in criminal cases, and lapse of the right to prosecute and definitions. Second Book deals with crimes including crimes against the state, against public order, crimes against life, and crimes against the person and property. Third Book sets out the misdemeanors, which are the lesser crimes.

=== 2023 Criminal Code ===
The Indonesian government has considered changes to the criminal code ever since independence, with the colonial-era code being seen as a mismatch with current national culture and values. In 2019, a new bill on criminal code was publicly announced, but controversial provisions criminalizing extramarital sex, abortions, and other restrictions on religious and civil liberties led to a series of protests and riots in response, ultimately causing the bill to replace the code to be scrapped. However, in 2022, a bill reintroducing the 2019 proposal with some statutes being "watered down" was passed by Indonesia's parliament and is planned to take effect in full after a three-year provisional period, despite similar concerns about its effect on civil rights and the rights of religious and sexual minorities.

The new criminal code is finally enacted as Law No. 1/2023 on the Criminal Code. The code is expanded to 624 articles, split into 2 Books: "General Provisions" and "Crime"; The new code no longer differentiates crime from lesser misdemeanors. It also contains provisions regarding government acknowledgement of 'living laws' (adat or customary rules) in punishing crimes.

First Book: on General Provisions
Chapters No.	Chapters (in English)	Chapters (in Indonesian)	Articles
I	Scopes of the Applicability of Criminal Law	Ruang Lingkup Berlakunya Ketentuan Peraturan Perundang-undangan Pidana	Art. 1-11
II	Crimes and Criminal Liability	Tindak Pidana dan Pertanggungjawaban Pidana	Art. 12-50
III	Sentencing, Punishment, and Enforcement	Pemidanaan, Pidana, dan Tindakan	Art. 51-131
IV	Lapse of Authority to Prosecute and to Carry Out Criminal Punishments	Gugurnya Kewenangan Penuntutan dan Pelaksanaan Pidana	Art. 132-143
V	Terminologies	Pengertian Istilah	Art. 144-186
VI	Concluding Provisions	Aturan Penutup	Art. 187

Second Book: on Crimes
Chapters No.	Chapters (in English)	Chapters (in Indonesian)	Articles
I	Crimes Against State Security	Tindak Pidana terhadap Keamanan Negara	Art. 188-216
II	Crimes Against the Dignity of the President and/or the Vice President	Tindak Pidana terhadap Martabat Presiden dan/atau Wakil Presiden	Art. 217-220
III	Crimes Against Cordial Foreign States	Tindak Pidana terhadap Negara Sahabat	Art. 221-231
IV	Crimes Against Meetings of Legislative and Government Bodies	Tindak Pidana terhadap Penyelenggaraan Rapat Lembaga Legislatif dan Badan Pemerintah	Art. 232-233
V	Crimes Against Public Order	Tindak Pidana terhadap Ketertiban Umum	Art. 234-277
VI	Crimes Against Judicial Process	Tindak Pidana terhadap Proses Peradilan	Art. 278-299
VII	Crimes Against Religions, Beliefs, and Religious or Faithful Life	Tindak Pidana terhadap Agama, Kepercayaan, dan Kehidupan Beragama atau Kepercayaan	Art. 300-305
VIII	Crimes Against the Safety of Persons, Health, and Property	Tindak Pidana yang Membahayakan Keamanan Umum bagi Orang, Kesehatan, dan Barang	Art. 306-346
IX	Crimes Against Government Authority	Tindak Pidana terhadap Kekuasaan Pemerintah	Art. 347-376
X	Perjury	Tindak Pidana Keterangan Palsu di atas Sumpah	Art. 373
XI	Counterfeiting of Currency and Banknotes	Tindak Pidana Pemalsuan Mata Uang dan Uang Kertas	Art. 374-381
XII	Forgery of Stamps, Seals, and State Marks	Tindak Pidana Pemalsuan Meterai, Cap Negara, dan Tera Negara	Art. 382-390
XIII	Forgery of Documents	Tindak Pidana Pemalsuan Surat	Art. 391-400
XIV	Crimes Against Persons' Origins and Marriage	Tindak Pidana terhadap Asal Usul dan Perkawinan	Art. 401-405
XV	Indecency	Tindak Pidana Kesusilaan	Art. 406-427
XVI	Desertion and Abandonment	Tindak Pidana Penelantaran Orang	Art. 428-432
XVII	Defamation	Tindak Pidana Penghinaan	Art. 433-442
XVIII	Revelation of Secrets	Tindak Pidana Pembukaan Rahasia	Art. 443-445
XIX	Crimes Against Personal Liberty	Tindak Pidana terhadap Kemerdekaan Orang	Art. 446-456
XX	Human Trafficking	Tindak Pidana Penyelundupan Manusia	Art. 457
XXI	Crimes Against Life and Fetus	Tindak Pidana terhadap Nyawa dan Janin	Art. 458-465
XXII	Physical Violence	Tindak Pidana terhadap Tubuh	Art. 466-473
XXIII	Causing Death or Bodily Harm due to Negligence	Tindak Pidana yang Mengakibatkan Mati atau Luka karena Kealpaan	Art. 474-475
XXIV	Theft	Tindak Pidana Pencurian	Art. 476-481
XXV	Extortion and Threats	Tindak Pidana Pemerasan dan Pengancaman	Art. 482-485
XXVI	Embezzlement	Tindak Pidana Penggelapan	Art. 486-491
XXVII	Fraud	Tindak Pidana Perbuatan Curang	Art. 492-510
XXVIII	Crimes Against Fiduciary Duty	Tindak Pidana terhadap Kepercayaan dalam menjalankan Usaha	Art. 511-520
XXIX	Vandalism and Destruction of Goods and Property	Tindak Pidana Perusakan dan Penghancuran Barang dan Bangunan Gedung	Art. 521-526
XXX	Crimes in Public Office	Tindak Pidana Jabatan	Art. 527-541
XXXI	Maritime Crime	Tindak Pidana Pelayaran	Art. 542-574
XXXII	Aviation Crime and Crime Against Flight Facilities and Infrastructures	Tindak Pidana Penerbangan dan Tindak Pidana terhadap Sarana serta Prasarana Penerbangan	Art. 575-590
XXXIII	Possession of Stolen Goods, as well as Crimes in Publication and Prints	Tindak Pidana Penadahan, Penerbitan, dan Pencetakan	Art. 591-596
XXXIV	Customary Criminal Law	Tindak Pidana Berdasarkan Hukum yang Hidup dalam Masyarakat	Art. 597
XXXV	Special Crimes	Tindak Pidana Khusus	Art. 598-612
XXXVI	Transitory Provisions	Ketentuan Peralihan	Art. 613-620
XXXVII	Concluding Provisions	Ketentuan Penutup	Art. 621-624

=== Punishments ===
Pre-2023 Criminal Code

Article 10 of the pre-2023 Criminal Code rules on the initial sets of punishments imposed on people convicted of a crime. There are two types of punishments: Main and Additional Punishments. Main punishments consist of:

- Capital punishment (pidana mati) by firing squads. Prior to 1964, the execution method used is hanging, while currently the preferred method is firing squad;
- Imprisonment (pidana penjara), either for life imprisonment, or for a minimum of one year and maximum of 20 years;
- Detention (pidana kurungan), which is the term used for imprisonment under one year imposed on people convicted of misdemeanors.;
- Fines (pidana denda); and
- Enshelterment (Pidana tutupan), a special type of imprisonment imposed on people convicted for crimes committed for "honorable means". The only time it was imposed was after the 3 July Affairs, of which the prisoners were important public and political figures.

Additional punishments, which imposed only to complement the main punishments, consist of:

- Deprivations of certain rights (pencabutan hak-hak tertentu);
- Seizures of certain property and goods (perampasan barang-barang tertentu); and
- Public announcement of court decisions (pembacaan putusan Hakim).

2023 Criminal Code

Article 64 of the new Criminal Code rules on three types of punishment categories: Main punishments, Additional punishments, and Capital punishment (written in the code as 'other punishments specified for particular crimes in other rules').

Main punishments consist of imprisonment, enshelterment, observation, paying fines, and, performing community services.

Additional punishments consist of:

- Deprivations of certain rights
- Seizures of certain property and goods
- Public announcement of court rulings and decisions
- Payment of restitution
- Fulfillment of customary obligation.

== Civil laws ==
Indonesian legal system utilizes the Civil Code (Kitab Undang-Undang Hukum Perdata or KUHPer, previously known as Burgerlijk Wetboek or BW), as well as two civil procedural codes: Herzien Inlandsche Reglement or HIR for civil cases in Java and Madura, and Rechtreglement voor de Buitengewesten or RBG for civil cases outside Java and Madura. There is also the Commerce Code (Kitab Undang-Undang Hukum Dagang or KUHD previously known as Wetboek voor Koophandel) used for basic commercial principles. The Civil Code, the Commerce Code, and both civil procedural codes are Dutch colonial legal codes, directly adapted from Dutch laws. Other rules concerning civil law may come from newer, more specific Acts and other regulations.

=== Civil code ===
The Civil Code (Staatsblad 1847:23, entered into force in 1848) is divided into four "Books": Persons (Orang), Property (Kebendaan), Contracts (Perikatan), and Evidence and Limitations (Pembuktian dan Daluwarsa). Note that many chapters and articles within the Civil Code has been repealed and replaced by newer legislations, such as rules on marriage in the Code is mostly regulated with 1974 Marriage Act.

First Book: on Persons
Chapters No.	Chapters (in English)	Chapters (in Indonesian)	Articles
I	Enjoyment and Loss of Civil Rights	Menikmati dan Kehilangan Hak Kewargaan	Art. 1-3
II	Deeds of the Civil Registry	Akta-akta Catatan Sipil	Art. 4-5
III	Residence or Domicile	Tempat Tinggal atau Domisili	Art. 6-25
IV	Marriage	Perkawinan	Art. 26-102
V	Rights and Obligations of Spouses	Hak dan Kewajiban Suami Isteri	Art. 103-118
VI	Marital Joint Property and its Management	Harta Bersama Menurut Undang-Undang dan Pengurusannya	Art. 119-138
VII	Nuptial Agreements	Perjanjian Kawin	Art. 139-179
VIII	Marital Joint Property or Nuptial Agreements in the Event of Second or Further Marriages	Gabungan Harta Bersama atau Perjanjian Kawin pada Perkawinan Kedua atau Selanjutnya	Art. 180-185
IX	Division of Joint Property	Pemisahan Harta Benda	Art. 186-198
X	Dissolution of Marriage	Pembubaran Perkawinan	Art. 199-232a
XI	Separation of Bed and Board	Pisah Meja dan Ranjang	Art. 233-249
XII	Paternity and the Origins of Children	Kebapakan dan Asal Keturunan Anak-anak	Art. 250-289
XIII	Familial Relationship by Blood and Marriage	Kekeluargaan Sedarah dan Semenda	Art. 290-297
XIV	Parental Authority	Kekuasaan Orang Tua	Art. 298-329
XIV-A	Stipulation, Amendment, and Revocation of Support Payments	Penentuan, Perubahan, dan Pencabutan Tunjangan Nafkah	Art. 329a-329b
XV	Minority and Guardianship	Kebelumdewasaan dan Perwalian	Art. 330-418a
XVI	Emancipation	Pendewasaan	Art. 419-432
XVII	Conservatorship	Pengampuan	Art. 433-461
-	Concluding Provisions	Ketentuan Penutup	Art. 462
XVIII	Absence	Ketidakhadiran	Art. 463-498

Second Book: on Property
Chapters No.	Chapters (in English)	Chapters (in Indonesian)	Articles
I	Property and Its Distinctions	Barang dan Pembagiannya	Art. 499-528
II	Possession of Property, and the Rights Resulting Therefrom	Besit dan Hak-hak yang Timbul Karenanya	Art. 529-569
III	Ownership of Property	Hak Milik	Art. 570-624
IV	Rights and Duties among Owners of Neighboring Plots of Land	Hak dan Kewajiban Antara Para Pemilik Pekarangan yang Bertetangga	Art. 625-672
V	Compulsory Labor	Kerja Rodi	Art. 673
VI	Servitude	Pengabdian Pekarangan	Art. 674-710
VII	Superficies (opstal)	Hak Numpang Karang	Art. 711-719
VIII	Ground Lease (erfpacht)	Hak Guna	Art. 720-736
IX	Interests in Land, and One-tenth Entitlements	Bunga Tanah dan Sepersepuluh	Art. 737-755
X	Usufructs (vruchtgebruik)	Hak Pakai Hasil	Art. 756-817
XI	Rights to Use and Occupy	Hak Pakai dan Hak Mendiami	Art. 818-829
XII	Inheritance by Demise	Pewarisan karena Kematian	Art. 830-873
XIII	Testaments	Surat Wasiat	Art. 874-1004
XIV	Testaments Executors and Estate Managers	Pelaksana Surat Wasiat dan Pengelola Harta Peninggalan	Art. 1005-1022
XV	Rights to Deliberate and to Detail over the Estate	Hak Berpikir dan Hak Istimewa untuk Merinci Harta Peninggalan	Art. 1023-1043
XVI	Acceptance and Rejection of Inheritances	Hal Menerima dan Menolak Warisan	Art. 1044-1065
XVII	Estate Division	Pemisahan Harta Peninggalan	Art. 1066-1125
XVIII	Unclaimed Estates	Harta Peninggalan yang Tak Terurus	Art. 1126-1130
XIX	Priority of Creditor Debts	Piutang dengan Hak Mendahulukan	Art. 1131-1149
XX	Mortgages over Moveable Property	Gadai	Art. 1150-1161
XXI	Mortgages over Fixed Registered Property	Hipotek	Art. 1162-1232

Third Book: on Contracts
Chapters No.	Chapters (in English)	Chapters (in Indonesian)	Articles
I	Contracts in General	Perikatan pada Umumnya	Art. 1233-1312
II	Commitments Arising from Contracts or Agreements	Perikatan yang Lahir dari Kontrak atau Persetujuan	Art. 1313-1351
III	Contracts Arising by Force of Law	Perikatan yang Lahir karena Undang-Undang	Art. 1352-1380
IV	Nullification of Contracts	Hapusnya Perikatan	Art. 1381-1456
V	Sales and Purchases	Jual Beli	Art. 1457-1540
VI	Exchanges	Tukar Menukar	Art. 1451-1456
VII	Leasing	Sewa Menyewa	Art. 1457-1600
VII-A	Employment Agreements	Perjanjian Kerja	Art. 1601-1603w
-	Concluding Provisions	Ketentuan Penutup	Art. 1601x-1617
VIII	Partnerships	Perseroan Perdata (Persekutuan Perdata)	Art. 1618-1652
IX	Legal Entities	Badan Hukum	Art. 1653-1665
X	Grants	Penghibahan	Art. 1666-1693
XI	Deposits of Goods	Penitipan Barang	Art. 1694-1739
XII	Lending	Pinjam Pakai	Art. 1740-1753
XIII	Loans for Consumption	Pinjam Pakai Habis	Art. 1754-1769
XIV	Fixed or Perpetual Interests	Bunga Tetap atau Bunga Abadi	Art. 1770-1773
XV	Aleatory Agreements	Persetujuan Untung-untungan	Art. 1774-1791
XVI	Issuance of Powers	Pemberian Kuasa	Art. 1792-1819
XVII	Guarantors	Penanggung Utang	Art. 1820-1864

Fourth Book: on Evidence and Limitations
Chapters No.	Chapters (in English)	Chapters (in Indonesian)	Articles
I	Evidence in General	Pembuktian pada Umumnya	Art. 1865-1866
II	Evidence by Letters	Pembuktian dengan Tulisan	Art. 1867-1894
III	Evidence by Witnesses	Pembuktian dengan Saksi-saksi	Art. 1895-1914
IV	Inferences	Persangkaan-persangkaan	Art. 1915-1922
V	Confessions	Pengakuan	Art. 1923-1928
VI	Oaths Taken Before the Judge	Sumpah di Muka Hakim	Art. 1929-1945
VII	Limitations	Daluwarsa	Art. 1946-1992
-	Concluding Provisions	Ketentuan Penutup	Art. 1993

== Family laws ==
Rules on marriage in Indonesia are stipulated mostly under the 1974 Marriage Act (Undang-Undang No. 1/1974 tentang Perkawinan) and has largely unchanged, safe for an amendment in 2019 and three constitutional reviews in 2010 (Note: Constitutional Court decision number 46/PUU-VIII/2010 on the civil relationship between a biological father and a child born out of wedlock.), 2015 (Note: Constitutional Court decision number 69/PUU-XIII/2015 on postnuptial agreements, previously not regulated under the Marriage Act.), and 2017 (Note: Constitutional Court decision number 22/PUU-XV/2017 on raising the minimum marriageable age to 19 for both man and woman.). The Act itself repealed several articles on family and marriage previously covered in the Civil Code, as well as repealed colonial laws on Mixed Marriage (Reglement op de Gemengde Huwelijken) and special rules for marriage of native Christians (Huwelijke Ordonantie Christen Indonesiers), creating a post-colonial outlook and approach on family law in Indonesia. In addition, some rules are also added through the official Indonesian Compilation of Islamic Laws (Kompilasi Hukum Islam), a set of general Sharia laws and principles in private laws, applicable and compatible with Islamic practices in present-day Indonesian Muslim society.

In summary:

- The act of marriage in Indonesian law is a spiritual union of man and woman, legal if it is lawful under each parties' religious rules of marriage. Such marriage then will be acknowledged by state and will be registered in the civil registry.
- All marriage by principle are monogamous. However, polygynous marriage is allowed under strict limitations, such as if the wife is unable to conceive or unable to exercise her family duty as a wife. Most importantly, the wife must be present and give the husband her permission to marry again. Meanwhile, polyandrous marriage is not allowed.
- Marriageable age is 19 for both man and woman. Prior to the 2017 constitutional review and 2019 amendment of the Act, it was 19 for man and 16 for woman. It was altered due to conflicting rules with another law which define a child as being under 18 years of age, including unborn child. However the Act still allowed the record of marriage involving parties below the marriageable age, if the parties request and receive a court dispensation (from the Religious Court if Muslim, from the District Court if other than Muslim).
- Marriage can be annulled by both husband and wife, or their parents, or an appointed official. Annulment is allowed if the marriage is found to be unlawful under religious laws or the civil law, or if the marriage is concluded under unlawful threat, or if one party discovered undisclosed personal matters regarding the other party. The time period and conditions for annulment is not unlimited, however; Different time limit applies for different conditions.
- Nuptial agreements (perjanjian perkawinan, lit. 'marriage agreement'), a legal term used in the Act to describe an agreement concluded between the parties, is encouraged and allowed to be concluded either before marriage, during the wedding ceremony, or after the wedding during the rest of the marriage. Prior to the 2015 constitutional review of the Act, nuptial agreements are limited to only those concluded before or during the wedding.
- Property acquired during marriage is considered joint ownership marital property. Property acquired before marriage by each parties are of their own, unless specified otherwise.
- Dissolution of marriage is only caused by death, by divorce, or by court decisions. The act of divorce is concluded in court hearings (Religious Court for Muslims, District Court for other than Muslims), after all attempt to solve the differences fail. Reason to divorce is limited by law:
  - A party committed adultery, or become alcoholic, drug abuser, or addicted to gambling;
  - A party abandoned the household for two continuous years without reasonable cause;
  - A party committed a crime and punished by incarceration for five years or more;
  - A party mistreated, abused, or endangered the other party (domestic abuse);
  - A party suffered from physical disability or disease, which render the party unable to exercise their family duty;
  - Continuous quarrels between husband and wife which render the parties unable to continue their marriage.
  - Under the official Indonesian Compilation of Islamic Laws, two more reasons for divorce is stated: (1) The husband violated the sighat taklik talak (marriage oath read by the husband in Islamic wedding), and (2) A party later converted to different faith, which may cause a crisis of faith in the household.
- The Act also regulates on Child. Children born in marriage or born as a result of a lawful marriage are lawful children. Children born out of wedlock have automatic familial relations to the mother and the mother's family, as well as the father, proven by paternity test. Prior to the 2010 constitutional review of the Act, children born out of wedlock only have familial relations to the mother, but no rules on the father.
- Children under the age of 18 are under their parents' protection and care, and they represent their children within and outside the court of law. Exception are made for children who are already married before the age of 18, they are to be considered adult.
- Guardians (wali) can be assigned guardianship over children under the age of 18, who are never married, and not under their parents' protection and care. Guardians also serve as caretaker over the children's property, and continue to do so until the children reach the age of 18 or considered an adult by virtue of marriage.
- Parents (and Guardians) can be stripped of their parental (or guardianship) authority by request of one of the parent, the grandparents, full siblings who already reached adulthood, or appointed officials. The reason for this action may be due to parental (or guardianship) neglect, or they are considered to be behaviorally unbefitting. Parent(s) who are stripped of their authority must still continue the support payment for their children. Guardians who are stripped of their authority will be replaced by court-appointed guardians.
- Marriage concluded overseas between Indonesian citizens or when one party is an Indonesian citizen is lawful if (1) The marriage itself is considered to be lawful under the law where the marriage is concluded, and (2) The Indonesian citizen(s) in this marriage got married lawfully under the Act. Vice versa, marriage concluded in Indonesia between an Indonesian citizen and a foreign citizen is also lawful under the same conditions. Only this latter type of marriage is formally known as Mixed Marriage (Perkawinan campuran) under the Act, and it is one option for foreigners to acquire Indonesian residence permits and citizenship.

=== Interfaith marriage ===
Curiously, despite the Act not acknowledging lawfulness of marriage concluded between man and woman of different faiths, it is also not explicitly outlawing them. Interfaith marriage in Indonesia remains a divisive issue. In June 2023, The Supreme Court has issued circular, forbidding judges in the lower courts to approve legalization requests of interfaith marriage as a requirement for registration at the civil registry, citing the obligation to uphold the definition of a lawful marriage ("...spiritual union of man and woman..." and "...lawful under each parties' religious rules of marriage."). Meanwhile, the Constitutional Court also rejected earlier petitions to review the Marriage Act, hence upholding the role of state and the importance of religion in family laws.

== Commercial and corporate laws ==
Indonesian commercial law utilizes several sets of laws, starting with the colonial Commerce Code. The Commerce Code repealed and replaced many articles regarding commercial and corporate activities in the Civil Code. In turn, new laws and regulations would be enacted to repeal and replace older rules from the codes, as well as to introduce new norms and rules, such as the Limited Liability Company Act of 2007 (Undang-Undang No. 40/2007 tentang Perseroan Terbatas).

The Commerce Code introduces several type of business entities (Badan Usaha):

- Sole Proprietorships (Perusahaan Perseorangan), where business is run by individual(s);
- Partnerships (Persekutuan), which includes:
  - Private Partnerships (Persekutuan Perdata or Maatschap), basic partnership formed to run a business, and usually ends when one of the partners left;
  - Firms (Persekutuan Firma, Vennootschap onder Firma, or simply Firma), where partnership runs a business under a common name, and the absence of one partner does not usually end the partnership;
  - Limited Partnerships (Persekutuan Komanditer or Commanditaire Vennootschap), where partners are differentiated between 'active partners' who invest in and run the business, and 'passive partners' who invest in the business, but do not run it. Very similar to Kommanditgesellschaft;
- Limited Liability Companies (Perseroan Terbatas), where business ownerships are divided into shares.

Of all these business entities, only limited liability companies are which to be considered a legal entity at the same time. Indonesian laws also acknowledge separate sets of Legal Entities (Badan Hukum):

- Limited Liability Companies;
- Foundations (Yayasan);
- Cooperatives (Koperasi); and
- Associations (Perkumpulan Berbadan Hukum).

=== Limited liability companies ===
The limited liability companies or PT are the most common legal entities registered to run business in Indonesia. It is the only form of business where foreign direct investments (FDI) are allowed. The form of limited liability companies in Indonesia are very similar to Naamloze Vennootschap or NV practiced in the Netherlands. PTs in Indonesia are required to form the following organs in order to run a business:

- a General Meeting of Shareholders (Rapat Umum Pemegang Saham or "RUPS"), authorized to appoint the Directors and Commissioners, amend the company's articles of association, approve the corporate policies, and approve the corporate dividend payouts and budgets;
- a Board of Directors (Direksi), authorized to manage the company and its assets, actively manage the company's bookkeeping, and serve as the company's representation; and
- a Board of Commissioners (Dewan Komisaris), authorized to oversee and observe the company's activities, as well as to give advice to the Directors.

== Agrarian laws ==
The agrarian laws in Indonesian are composed mostly regarding land laws, but in the broadest term might include resource management principles on water, mining, fishery, and forestry. The authoritative statute regarding this subject is the 1960 Agrarian Basic Law Act (Undang-Undang No. 5/1960 tentang Peraturan Dasar Pokok-pokok Agraria) or simply the Agrarian Act. Its purpose was to unify the already-existing colonial and various adat rules on land and land use, and transform them into a national land reform framework for a modern agrarian laws.

In summary:

- All the land, water, and air space of Indonesia, including all resources within it, belongs to the Indonesian nation (Bangsa Indonesia), and the nation authorized the state to control its use and rights over the land, water, air space, and the resources within. It means that claims to 'unclaimed' land or resources will not be acknowledged, as no land is considered res nullius by principle.
- The state acknowledged both individual and communal ownership over land and resources. The latter (known as Hak Ulayat) is more relevant within the context of traditional indigenous communities of Indonesia, who may still practices communal ownership of goods and resources within their respective community. However these acknowledgement of traditional rights will not overrule national development effort.
- The Act and other regulations set on several rights over the use of land:
  - Primary rights, where it is directly granted from the nation's right over land (rights granted by the state). It consists of four rights, limited to Indonesian citizens only:
    - Right of Ownership (Hak Milik), which only Indonesian citizens and a limited number of legal entities may acquire it. Foreign citizens, foreign legal entity, and Indonesians with more than one citizenships are excluded from having this right, even if they managed to acquire such right by means of inheritance or by marital joint property. In such situation, within one year they must transfer the rights over the assets to someone lawful or said assets be taken over by the state;
    - Right to Cultivate (Hak Guna Usaha), which only Indonesian citizens and legal entities registered in Indonesia may acquire it. The right authorized its holder to control and use the land for agriculture, plantation, fishery, and/or husbandry purposes;
    - Right to Build (Hak Guna Bangunan), which only Indonesian citizens and legal entities registered in Indonesia may acquire it. The right authorized its holder to construct structure on the land for personal or business use;
    - Right to Use Granted by State (Hak Pakai yang diberikan negara) granted its holder to use the land for personal or business purposes within a certain period of time. The right is granted to Indonesian citizen, legal entities registered in Indonesia, government institutions, religious and social organizations, foreign citizens based in Indonesia, foreign legal entities with a representation based in Indonesia, and diplomatic missions of foreign states or international organizations.
  - Secondary rights, where it is indirectly granted from the nation's right over land (rights granted from the land owners). It consists of:
    - Right to Build Granted by Land Owners (Hak Guna Bangunan yang diberikan pemilik tanah);
    - Right to Use Granted by Land Owners (Hak Pakai yang diberikan pemilik tanah);
    - Right to Land Pledge (Hak Gadai Tanah);
  - Grants, or Waqf, of land and property for the purpose of Islamic worship, education, and social welfare, in perpetuity;
  - Encumbrance rights (Hak Tanggungan) over land, which is a mortgage guarantee attached to land, separate from hipotek, which are mortgage rights over fixed property other than land;
  - Strata titles over condominiums (Hak atas Satuan Rumah Susun), which is subject to 2011 Condominium Act (Undang-Undang No. 20/2011 tentang Rumah Susun); and
  - Other rights yet to be phased out, such as Right to Sharecrop (Hak Usaha Bagi Hasil), Right to Lodge (Hak Menumpang), and Right to Lease (Hak Sewa).

== Intellectual Property laws ==
Intellectual Property (IP) laws exist and sufficiently regulated. Several categories of IP rights are acknowledged, regulated, and protected under its own act.

IP categories (in Indonesian)	IP categories (in English)	Duration of IP protection
Merek	Trademarks	10 years
Paten	Patents	20 years
Desain industri	Industrial designs	10 years
Hak cipta	Copyrights	70 years in general; 50 years for computer programs, artistic performance, and phonographic producers; 20 years for broadcasting.
Indikasi geografis	Geographical indications	Protection last for as long as the reputation, quality, and characteristic attached to the goods, all of which are the basis of the GI rights authorization, are maintained.
Desain tata letak sirkuit terpadu	Integrated circuit layout designs	10 years
Rahasia dagang	Trade secrets	Undetermined
Perlindungan varietas tanaman	Plant varieties protection	20 years for annual plants; 25 years for perennial plants.
Hak intelektual komunal	Communal intellectual properties	Undetermined

Trademarks

Marks (Merek) are two- or three-dimensional visual signs represented with images, logos, names, words, letters, numbers, sets of colors, sounds, holographic imageries, or any combinations thereof, created with the purpose of differentiating goods and/or services provided by any individuals or entities, used in any commercial activities. These marks are to be used for identification of products, promotion of products, quality assurance of products, and marker of products' origins.

A registered trademark's protection lasts for 10 years since the date of trademark authorization, and renewable for extensions.

Trademarks protection is regulated under the 2016 Trademarks and Geographical Indications Act (Undang-Undang No. 20/2016 tentang Merek dan Indikator Geografis).

Patents

Patents (Paten) are exclusive rights which belong to inventors of technological inventions. Ownership of patents allowed inventors to implement themselves or authorize others to implement the inventions. Inventions (Invensi) are defined as inventors' problem-solving ideas in a technology-specific problems, which may appear as a product, a process, or an innovation and development of said products and processes. Meanwhile, Simple Patents (Paten Sederhana) are different from normal patents, in which they are improvement of an existing process and products, directly applicable in the industry.

A patent's right lasts for 20 years since the date of patent authorization. A Simple Patent's right may lasts for 10 years since the date of patent authorization.

Patents protection is regulated under the 2016 Patents Act (Undang-Undang No. 13/2016 tentang Paten).

Industrial designs

Industrial designs (Desain Industri) are defined as a two- or three-dimensional creative works of forms, configurations, or compositions of lines and/or colors, or any combinations thereof, with an aesthetical value and executed into a two- or three-dimensional form, and applicable in the production of goods, industrial commodities, or hand-crafted products.

An industrial design's right and protection lasts for 10 years since the date of industrial design authorization. The right owner holds exclusive rights to either authorize or to forbid its commercial use.

Industrial designs protection is regulated under the 2000 Industrial Designs Act (Undang-Undang No. 31/2000 tentang Desain Industri).

Copyrights

Copyrights (Hak Cipta) are exclusive rights of creators over their creative works, automatically exist and enter into force under a principle of declaration after its creation. Within the rules of copyrights, a Related Rights (Hak Terkait) serve as an exclusive rights granted to performers, phonographic producers, or broadcasting bodies who utilized and benefitted from performing, producing, and broadcasting creative works. Under copyright laws, several creative works are protected, such as:

- Books, computer programs, pamphlets, layouts of published writings, and other creative writings;
- Sermons, lectures, orations, and other related creative works;
- Props made for education and scientific purposes;
- Songs and musical works, with or without lyrics;
- Theatrical dramas, musical dramas, dances, choreographies, puppetries (pewayangan) (Note: Specifically includes Indonesian-style wayang puppetry.), and pantomimes;
- Fine arts, which include painting, drawing, carving, calligraphies, sculptures, plastic arts, collages, and applied arts;
- Architectures;
- Maps, charts, and other products of cartography;
- Batik techniques;
- Photographs; and
- Translations, interpretations, adaptations, anthologies, and other transformed products.

Several dates of copyright protections exist:

- General copyrights last for the creators' lifetime plus 70 years;
- Computer program copyrights last for 50 years since the first publication;
- Performers copyrights last for 50 years since the first show;
- Phonographic producers copyrights last for 50 years since the first publication;
- Broadcasting bodies copyrights last for 20 years since first airing.

Copyrights protection is regulated under the 2014 Copyrights Act (Undang-Undang No. 28/2014 tentang Hak Cipta).

Geographical indications

Geographical indications or GI (Indikasi Geografis) are a mark or sign which indicate an origin of produced goods, which due to its geographical elements, may it be natural or manmade, able to attach to those goods a certain reputation, quality, and characteristic.

Protection of GI rights last for as long as the reputation, quality, and characteristic attached to the goods, all of which are the basis of the GI rights authorization, are maintained.

GI protection is regulated under the 2016 Trademarks and Geographical Indications Act (Undang-Undang No. 20/2016 tentang Merek dan Indikator Geografis).

Integrated circuit layout designs

Integrated circuit layout designs (Desain Tata Letak Sirkuit Terpadu) are defined as a three-dimensional assembly of a layout design, of which one part of it have to be an active element, also of which all of the interconnects or part of the interconnects of an integrated circuit and the three-dimensional assembly are meant for the creation of an integrated circuit.

Meanwhile, an integrated circuit or IC (Sirkuit Terpadu) is defined as a produced good, finished or semi finished, of which one part of it have to be an active element, also of which all of the interconnects or part of the interconnects are integrated within a semiconducting material to achieve an electronic function.

An IC layout design protection last for 10 years since the layout design first commercially exploited or since the date of authorization.

The IC Layout Design protection is regulated under the 2000 Integrated Circuit Layout Designs Act (Undang-Undang No. 32/2000 tentang Desain Tata Letak Sirkuit Terpadu).

Trade secrets

Trade secret (Rahasia Dagang) is a publicly unknown information of technological or business value, which also have an economic value for its usefulness in business activity, and for that it is to be kept secret by its owners. These trade secrets may include methods of production, processing methods, sales method, or other technological and/or business information, which may have economic value and unknown to the general public.

Protection of Trade Secret rights is regulated under the 2000 Trade Secrets Act (Undang-Undang No. 30/2000 tentang Rahasia Dagang).

Plant varieties

Plant varieties protection (Perlindungan Varietas Tanaman) is an exclusive right of plant breeders to control materials relating to cultivating a unique plant variety.

Protection of plant variety rights is regulated under the 2000 Plant Variety Protection Act (Undang-Undang No. 29/2000 tentang Perlindungan Varietas Tanaman).

Communal IPs

With the ratification of Nagoya Protocol, Indonesian IP protection laws beginning to acknowledge communal rights over certain IPs, such as: (1) Expressions of traditional cultures, (2) Traditional knowledge, and (3) Genetic resources. In addition, potential GI rights can be applied under a communal rights belonging to a community.

Communal IP protection is regulated under the 2017 Law and Human Rights Ministerial Regulation on Communal Intellectual Property Data.

== International law and treaties ==
Rules and regulations regarding the application of international laws in Indonesia are based in the Art. 11 of the Constitution, the 2000 Treaties Act (Undang-Undang Nomor 24 Tahun 2000 tentang Perjanjian Internasional) and 2018 Constitutional Court decision on the Act. International treaties, following its signature or accession by authorized Indonesian officials, need to be debated by the People's Representative Council and ratified into acts. Treaties concerning these following subjects must be ratified by acts:

- Political issues, peace agreements, and matters of national defense and security;
- Territorial changes or border delimitation of Indonesian territory;
- Indonesian sovereignty or sovereign rights;
- Basic human rights and the environment;
- Formation of new legal norms; and
- Foreign loans and/or grants.

Some treaties, however, can be ratified using only presidential regulations, if the subjects of the treaties are not concerning the points mentioned above, or if said treaties are mere procedural and do not need any form of ratification into national legislations (i.e. protocols to a treaty).

== Problems with the system ==
There are still many problems with the legal system in Indonesia. Many laws and regulations conflict with each other, and because the legal system (including the courts) sometimes does not operate effectively, it can be difficult to resolve these conflicts. Further, the rule of law in Indonesia is often undermined by rife corruption among the nation's judiciary and law enforcers.

=== Resources ===
The overall legal system is badly under resourced, both in the public sector and the private sector which provides many services to clients. For example, in early 2015 it was reported that there was a severe shortage of judges which was particularly affecting the operations of district courts (pengadilan negeri). It was reported that around 250 new judges were needed each year but that no new judges had been appointed for four years. At the time, Indonesia was reported to have a total of around 8,300 judges but that around an additional 1,000 judges were needed to fill the backlog.

The Indonesian government and professional lawyers in Indonesia are well-aware of these problems and are working, over time, to improve the system.

== See also ==
- Law enforcement in Indonesia
- Indonesian criminal procedure
