= 2023 Indonesian Penal Code =

Criminal code of Indonesia commenced in 2023

UU Kitab Undang-Undang Hukum Pidana (UU KUHP)

House of Representatives
- Long title: Undang-Undang Nomor 1 Tahun 2023 tentang Kitab Undang-Undang Hukum Pidana (Penal Code Act 2023 c. 1)
- Citation: Act No. 1/2023
- Territorial extent: Indonesia
- Passed by: House of Representatives
- Passed: 6 December 2022
- Signed by: President Joko Widodo
- Commenced: 2 January 2023
- Effective: 2 January 2026

Legislative history
- Bill title: RUU Kitab Undang-Undang Hukum Pidana (Bill on Penal Code)

Amends
- 21 acts

Repeals
- 8 acts including the Wetboek van Strafrecht
- Status: In force

The Penal Code Act 2023, also known as the 2023 Indonesian Penal Code or 2023 Indonesian Criminal Code and often referred to as the New Penal Code (Indonesian: KUHP Baru), is the new penal code in Indonesia, replacing the Dutch-era code. This law is the most comprehensive and time-consuming legislation ever crafted in Indonesia, having taken over 50 years to develop since its initial formulation.

The law took effect on 2 January 2026, three years after its enactment.

== History ==
Before the law was passed, the Dutch-era Penal Code served as Indonesia's penal code. Since 1968, Indonesian lawmakers, legal experts, and researchers have worked on drafting a national Penal Code. Numerous drafts were created, but none succeeded in replacing the existing code.

Since independence, the Indonesian government has considered revising the Penal Code, as the colonial-era code was seen as incompatible with current cultural values. In 2019, a new penal code bill was announced, but it sparked widespread protests and riots due to controversial provisions criminalizing premarital sex, extramarital sex, abortion, and restrictions on religious and civil liberties. These protests ultimately led to the bill being shelved. However, in 2022, Indonesia's parliament passed a new bill reintroducing the 2019 proposal with some "watered-down" provisions. This new code is expected to take full effect after a three-year provisional period, despite continued concerns about its impact on civil rights and the rights of religious and sexual minorities.

The new Penal Code has been enacted as Law No. 1/2023 on the Penal Code. It has been expanded to 624 articles, divided into two books: "General Provisions" and "Crime." The new code no longer differentiates between crimes and lesser misdemeanors. It also includes provisions acknowledging 'living laws' (adat, or customary rules) in the punishment of crimes. Additionally, the code introduces the concept of "fine categories," similar to that of the Netherlands.

== Repealed laws ==
- Staatsblad No. 732 of 1915, as amended by Law No. 1/1946 on the Penal Code.
- Law No. 73/1958 on the Establishment of Law No. 1/1946 as the Penal Code for all Indonesian regions.
- Law No. 1/1960 on Amendments to the Penal Code.
- Law No. 16/Prp/1960 on Certain Amendments to the Penal Code.
- Law No. 18/Prp/1960 on Changes to Fines in the Penal Code and other criminal regulations.
- Law No. 7/1974 on Gambling Control.
- Law No. 4/1976 on Amendments related to the Expansion of Criminal Acts Defined in the Penal Code and Crimes against Aviation and Aviation Infrastructure.
- Law No. 27/1999 on Amendments to the Penal Code concerning Crimes Against State Security.

== Amended laws ==
- Emergency Law No. 1/1951 on Temporary Provisions for the Organization, Unity, and Standardization of Civil Court Powers and Procedures.
- Emergency Law No. 12/1951 on Arms.
- Law No. 1/PNPS/1965 on the Prevention of Misuse and/or Desecration of Religions.
- Law No. 31/1999, as amended by Law No. 20/2001, on the Eradication of Corruption Crimes.
- Law No. 26/2000 on the Human Rights Court.
- Law No. 23/2002, as amended by Law No. 17/2016, on Child Protection.
- Law No. 15/2003, as amended by Law No. 5/2018, on Anti-Terrorism Acts.
- Law No. 20/2003 on the National Education System.
- Law No. 21/2007 on the Eradication of Human Trafficking Crimes.
- Law No. 11/2008, as amended by Law No. 9/2016, on Electronic Information and Transactions.
- Law No. 40/2008 on the Eradication of Racial and Ethnic Discrimination.
- Law No. 44/2008 on Pornography.
- Law No. 24/2009 on Flags, Language, State Symbols, and the National Anthem.
- Law No. 35/2009 on Health.
- Law No. 36/2009 on Narcotics.
- Law No. 8/2010 on the Prevention and Eradication of Money Laundering.
- Law No. 6/2011 on Immigration.
- Law No. 7/2011 on Currency.
- Law No. 18/2012 on Food.
- Law No. 9/2013 on the Prevention and Eradication of Terrorism Funding Crimes.
- Law No. 13/2006, as amended by Law No. 31/2014, on Witness and Victim Protection.

== Criticisms ==
The Penal Code contains several controversial articles, including:

=== Crimes against the personal dignity and honor of the sitting president and vice president ===
Article 218, Section 1 of the code states that any person who attacks the personal dignity and honor of the sitting president or vice president may be punished with up to 3 years and 6 months imprisonment and a fourth-category fine (200 million rupiah). However, Section 2 of Article 218 provides that such personal attacks may be permitted if they are made in self-defense or in the public interest. Although pro-democracy activists argue that this law infringes on human rights, it specifies that cases can only proceed if the sitting president or vice president personally files a complaint.

=== Magic and black magic ===
Article 252 of the code regulates magic and black magic. Section 1 of the article states that anyone who claims to possess the ability to perform magic, announces it, gives hope to people for such abilities, or offers and aids in such services that cause significant bodily and mental harm, diseases, or death, will be punished with up to 1 year and 6 months imprisonment and a fourth-category fine (200 million rupiah). Section 2 of the article imposes additional penalties on magic and black magic practitioners who make a living from these activities. This article is controversial, as it is difficult to prove such claims.

=== Hoaxing and trolling ===
Hoaxing and trolling have become a part of the culture in Indonesia, both among pro-government and anti-government groups, and are widely enjoyed by the population. Troll "factories" and so-called "cyber armies" have been operating in Indonesia since 2016, generating revenue by sowing discord and flooding the internet with socio-political and religious misinformation. Article 263 threatens trolls and hoax creators with up to 6 years of imprisonment. Protesters argued that this regulation threatens what they called "democracy" and viewed it as an attempt to silence critics. The Ministry of Law and Human Rights responded by condemning the protesters' claims, emphasizing that while criticism is vital for the country, spreading lies and misleading people is not acceptable. The ministry urged the public to read the law carefully and refrain from consuming or spreading irresponsible statements.

=== Personal space invasion by law enforcement ===
Articles 411 to 413 of the code outlaw domestic partner relationship, cohabitation, and incestuous relationship. For pro-privacy advocates, such regulations may be seen as an invasion of personal space by law enforcement, although the law specifies that such acts can only be prosecuted if a report is filed by nuclear family. With this code, the government hopes that local law enforcement will not invade privacy, as the law is now codified, and that there will no longer be local regulations granting excessive power to local authorities. However, these articles do not apply to Muslims in Aceh Province, where a different law enforcement system is in place under Law No. 11/2006 (On Aceh Province), governed by Wilayatul Hisbah, which is not affected by the new code.

== Responses ==
=== Attacks against government institutions ===
On 7 December 2022, a suicide bombing occurred at a police station in Astana Anyar District, Bandung, West Java. The attacker and one police officer were killed in the explosion, while 11 people were injured, including 3 police officers. Police Chief General Listyo Sigit Prabowo stated that the perpetrator was affiliated with the Jamaah Ansharut Daulah (JAD) Bandung branch.

Opposition to the passing of the Penal Code Bill into law was the motive behind the bombing, as the motorcycle used by the suicide bomber to reach the police station was adorned with pamphlets condemning the Penal Code. One of the pamphlets carried by the perpetrator read, "KUHP is the law of the mushrik and infidels, declare war to the enforcers of the Devil's Law." The same pamphlet also referenced verse 29 of Surah At-Tawba, which calls for the imposition of jizya on non-Muslims.

=== Foreign condemnation ===
The passing of the law was condemned by the governments of Australia, the United States, South Korea, and even the United Nations, primarily for failing to accommodate protections and rights for LGBT individuals and domestic partnerships, as well as for not ensuring sufficient privacy, equity, religious freedom, and rights related to journalism and sexuality. The European Union also criticized the law for its excessive regulations on privacy, particularly concerning premarital sex, which they argued threatens democracy and freedom of speech. The Executive Office of the President of the Republic of Indonesia rejected claims that the new law contradicts democracy. Additionally, the Deputy Minister of the Ministry of Law and Human Rights dismissed the international condemnations, asserting that the law is a domestic matter and should not be compared to the laws of other countries.

== Literature ==
- Crouch, M. (2013). Law and Religion in Indonesia: Conflict and the courts in West Java. Routledge Contemporary Southeast Asia Series. Taylor & Francis. ISBN 978-1-134-50836-5.

== See also ==
- Law of Indonesia
- List of acts of the House of Representatives of Indonesia from 2023
