= List of acts of the House of Representatives of Indonesia from 2023 =

This is a list of acts of the House of Representatives of Indonesia passed in 2023.

Acts passed since 1945 are titled with information in regards to their type, number, year of promulgation or stipulation and their long title. In a situation where Government Decree is declared to be a law, the word stipulation is added before the title of the Act which ends with the phrase "to become law"

The 12th Period of the House of Representatives of Indonesia, which began on October 1, 2019, and will end on October 10, 2024, has enacted 22 acts and/or ratification of international treaties in 2023.

== Public laws and international treaties ==
In 2023, the 12th House of Representatives of Indonesia has enacted the following laws and/or ratification of international treaties:

Act No.	Date of enactment	Short title(s)	Long title	Link to the State Gazette.
1 (2023)	January 2, 2023	2023 Indonesian Penal Code	An Act on the Indonesian Penal Code.	
2 (2023)	January 3, 2023	2023 Fiji - Indonesia Defence Cooperation Agreement	Agreement Between the Republic of Indonesia and the Government of the Republic of Fiji Concerning Cooperation in the Field of Defence.	
3 (2023)	January 3, 2023	2023 Indonesia - Singapore Defence Cooperation Agreement	Agreement Between the Republic of Indonesia and the Government of the Republic of Singapore on Defence Cooperation.	
4 (2023)	January 12, 2023	Financial Sector Development and Strengthening Act	An Act to Better Develop and Strengthening of the Financial Sector.	
5 (2023)	January 13, 2023	2023 Indonesia - Singapore Extradition Agreement	Treaty Between the Government of the Republic of Indonesia and the Government of the Republic of Singapore for the Extradition of Fugitives.	
6 (2023)	March 31, 2023	Omnibus Law on Job Creation	An Act to Give Effect on the Government Regulation in Lieu of Law 2023 c. 2 Concerning Job Creation to be made into Law.	
7 (2023)	May 4, 2023	General Elections (Amendments) Act 2023	An Act to Better Determine the Government Regulations in Lieu of Law 2022 c. 1 On the Amendments of the General Elections Act 2017 c. 7 to be Made into Law.	
8 (2023)	May 4, 2023	North Sumatra Act 2023	An Act to repeal the Division of Sumatra into Three Provinces Act 1948 c. 10; and to Further Implement Better Governance in North Sumatra.	
9 (2023)	May 4, 2023	South Sumatra Act 2023	An Act to repeal the Stipulation of "Government Regulations in Lieu of Law 1950 c. 3 Concerning the Establishment of Level I Region of South Sumatra" Act 1959 c. 25 and the "Emergency Act 1955 c. 16 Concerning the Amendments to Government Regulations in Lieu of Law 1950 c. 3"; and to Further Implement Better Governance in South Sumatra.	
10 (2023)	May 4, 2023	West Java Act 2023	An Act to repeal the West Java Act 1950 c. 11; and to Further Implement Better Governance in West Java.	
11 (2023)	May 4, 2023	Central Java Act 2023	An Act to repeal the Central Java Act 1950 c. 10; and to Further Implement Better Governance in Central Java.	
12 (2023)	May 4, 2023	East Java Act 2023	An Act to repeal the Stipulation of the "Emergency Act 1950 c. 2 Concerning the Publication of the State Gazette of the Republic of the United States of Indonesia and the Official Gazette of the Republic of the United States of Indonesia and Concerning Issues in Promulgating and the Commencement into Effect of Federal Laws and Government Regulations as Federal Law"; and to Further Implement Better Governance in East Java.	
13 (2023)	May 4, 2023	Maluku Act 2023	An Act to repeal the Stipulation of "Emergency Act 1957 c. 22 Concerning the Establishment of Level I Self-Governing Region of Maluku (State Gazette of 1957 No. 79) as Law" Act 1958 c. 20; and to Further Implement Better Governance in Maluku.	
14 (2023)	May 4, 2023	Central Kalimantan Act 2023	An Act to repeal the Stipulation of "Emergency Act 1957 c. 10 concerning the Establishment of Level I Self-Governing Region of Central Kalimantan and Such Amendments to the Establishment of Level I Self-Contained Regions in West Kalimantan, South Kalimantan, and East Kalimantan Act 1956 c. 25" (State Gazette of 1957 No. 83) and to further repeal Concerning the Formation of Autonomous Regions in the Provinces of West Kalimantan, South Kalimantan and East Kalimantan Act 1956 c. 25 as Law; and to Further Implement Better Governance in Central Kalimantan.	
15 (2023)	May 4, 2023	Bali Act 2023	An Act to repeal the Bali, West Nusa Tenggara and East Nusa Tenggara Act 1958 c. 64; and to Further Implement Better Governance in Bali.	
16 (2023)	May 12, 2023	Continental Shelf Act 2023	An Act to repeal the Indonesian Continental Shelf Act 1973; and to make relevant adjustment, and for connected purposes.	
17 (2023)	August 8, 2023	Health Act 2023	An Act to repeal the Midwifery Act 2019; Health Quarantine Act 2018; Nursing Act 2014; Health Workers Act 2014; Mental Health Act 2014; Medical Education Act 2013; Hospitals Act 2009; Health Act 2009; Medical Practice Act 2004; Infectious Disease Outbreaks Act 1984; and the Staatsblad's Hard Drugs Ordinance Act 1949; and to make relevant adjustment, and for connected purposes.	
18 (2023)	October 11, 2023	2022 State Revenue and Expenditure Budget Accountability Act 2023	An Act to hold accountable for the implementation of the state revenue and expenditure budget for the 2022 fiscal year.	
19 (2023)	October 16, 2023	2024 State Revenue and Expenditure Budget Act 2023	An Act to regulate the State Revenue and Expenditure Budget (APBN) for Fiscal Year 2024 by setting limits on the terms used in its regulation.	
20 (2023)	October 31, 2023	State Civil Apparatus Act 2023	An Act to repeal the State Civil Apparatus Act 2014; and to make relevant adjustment, and for connected purposes.	
21 (2023)	October 31, 2023	State Capital (Amendments) Act 2023	An Act to provide legal certainty to accelerate the process of preparation, construction and relocation of the National Capital City, as well as the implementation of the Special Regional Government for the Nusantara Capital City; and to make amendments to the State Capital Act 2022.	
22 (2023)	December 20, 2023	Prohibition of Nuclear Weapons Act 2023	An Act to ratify the Treaty on the Prohibition of Nuclear Weapons.	
