= Maria Farida Indrati =

Former Indonesian judge

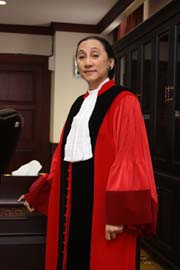
- Official portrait

Justice of the Indonesian Constitutional Court
- In office 19 August 2008 – 13 August 2018
- Appointed by: President Susilo Bambang Yudhoyono
- Succeeded by: Enny Nurbaningsih

Personal details
- Born: 14 June 1949 (age 76) Surakarta, Central Java, Indonesia

Maria Farida Indrati (referred to as Farida; born 14 June 1949) is a former justice of the Constitutional Court of Indonesia for two terms. During her both terms, she was the only woman among the Court's nine members.

== Biography ==
Farida was born in Surakarta, Central Java, Indonesia on 14 June 1949; she is the eldest of eight children born to an Antara reporter and his wife. As a child, she studied under Catholic nuns. Because she had polio, she initially wanted to be a pianist. However, due to her father's disapproval, she studied law at the University of Indonesia, receiving a Bachelor of Laws degree in 1975. Studying under Hamid Attamimi, the "founder of the Indonesian Constitution Science", she decided to stay in law.

Farida received her notary public's degree in 1982. She later received a Master of Laws degree from the same institution in 1997, finishing her doctorate studies in 2002. She has also taken non-formal courses on law making in Leiden, Vrije Universiteit Amsterdam, Boston, and San Francisco.

Farida initially worked to draft legislation.

She first served as a justice of the Constitutional Court after she was requested to do so by President Susilo Bambang Yudhoyono in 2008; she had previously been asked by eight different women's rights organisations, but had refused. She is the nine-member court's first, as of 2010 only, female justice. During the constitutional court's appraisal of the Bill against Pornography and Pornoaction, she headed the three member specialty panel. Of the three, she was the only one to question its necessity, saying that the law was "open to too many interpretations, the definition of pornography [too] ambiguous, ... divisive and bound to be difficult to implement," and noting that traditional dances like Jaipongan could fall under its definition. She has also dissented in cases regarding blasphemy law and a quota for legislative seats for women. She was initially expected to serve until 2013.

Yudhoyono attempted to appoint Farida to a second term in 2013, though her reappointment alongside the appointment of colleague Patrialis Akbar was initially blocked by the Jakarta State Administrative Court. Yudhoyono's office appealed the ruling on behalf of the two justices, succeeding after the Jakarta High Administrative Court found that the petition against the two of them lacked legal standing for the challenge. Farida also served on one of three panels set up by the Constitutional Court to investigate former presidential candidate Prabowo Subianto Djojohadikusumo's complaint in the Indonesian presidential election, 2014, serving on the panel alongside fellow justices Ahmad Fadlil Sumadi and Aswanto. The panels ultimately found that the claims of Subianto's campaign were mostly without merit.

Farida is also a lecturer on legislation at the University of Indonesia; after becoming a constitutional justice, she kept the job because she feared that "if [she did not] teach it would be tempting for [her to] not read or not learn anything new". She is also a guest lecturer at numerous other universities.

== Views ==
Farida believes that the Constitution of Indonesia guarantees equality between Indonesian men and women, but that its application has been lacking. She believes that the traditionally patriarchal culture has limited women's chances by limiting their educational opportunities.

== Personal life ==
Farida is a Catholic.
