= NAEK =

NAEK may refer to:

- Naek L. Tobing, Indonesian physician, sexologist and author
- National Academy of Engineering of Korea, South Korean nonprofit founded to support engineering and technology development
