= Enny Nurbaningsih =

Indonesian judge (born 1962

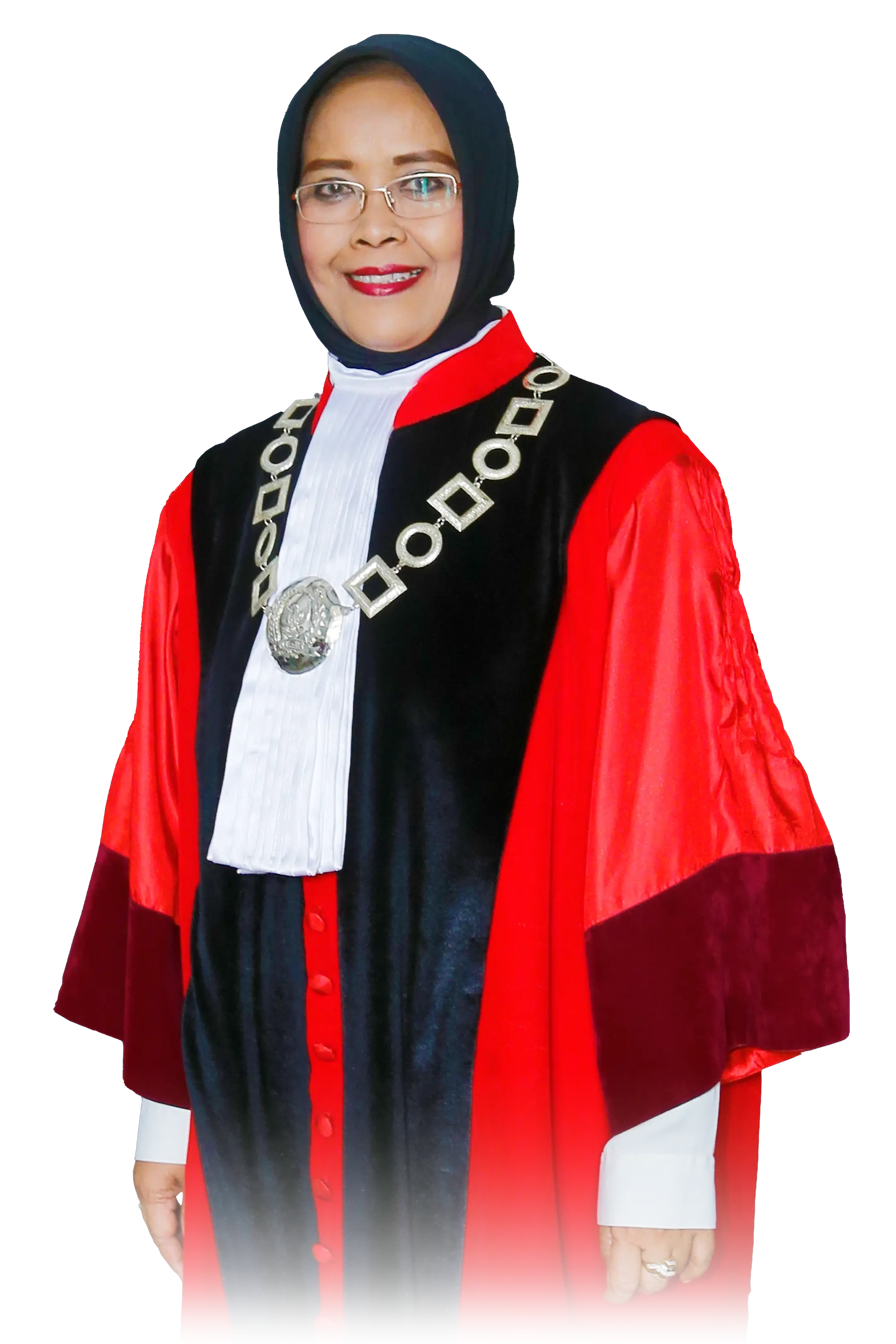

Justice of the Constitutional Court of Indonesia
- Incumbent
- Assumed office 13 August 2018
- Appointed by: Joko Widodo
- Preceded by: Maria Farida Indrati

Personal details
- Born: 27 June 1962 (age 64) Pangkalpinang, Indonesia
- Education: Gadjah Mada University

Enny Nurbaningsih (born 27 June 1962) is an Indonesian judge and academic, justice of the Constitutional Court of Indonesia since 2018.

== Career ==
Nurbaningsih was born on 27 June 1962 in Pangkalpinang, Indonesia. She got a degree in laws in 1981 from the Gadjah Mada University.

She has been professor of constitutional law at the Gadjjah Mada University.

Alongside Mahfud MD, she founded the Parliament Watch in 1998 as a watchdog of the parliamentary activity. For four years, Nurbaningsih was head of the National Law Development Agency of the Ministry of Law and Human Rights.

At the governmental level, Nurbaningsih has led the government team that passed the 2018 terrorism law and also the team that revised the Indonesian Penal Code.

In 2018 she was elected by the Indonesian president Joko Widodo as the new justice of the Constitutional Court of Indonesia to succeed Maria Farida Indrati and was sworn in on 13 August 2018.
