= Indonesian criminal procedure =

Law within Indonesia

Criminal Procedure in Indonesia

Criminal Procedure Code
- Kitab Undang-Undang Hukum Acara Pidana (KUHAP); Number 8 of 1981

Relevant Provisions
- Chapter V - Arrest, Detention, Search of the Person, House Entry, Seizure and Examination of Documents; Chapter VI - The Suspect and The Accused; Chapter XVI - Examination at Trial; Chapter XVII - Ordinary Legal Remedies; Chapter XVIII - Extraordinary Legal Remedies; Chapter XIV - Investigation; Chapter XIX - The Execution of Judgements

Courts of Indonesia
- General Courts of Justice; Religious Courts; Military Courts; Administrative Courts; Human Rights Courts

Number of Cases Received in 1997 by State

Indonesia is a civil law country with five major codes. Its criminal procedure code, the Kitab Undang-Undang Hukum Acara Pidana ("KUHAP"), determines the procedures and rights of individuals at different stages of the trial process.

== History of Indonesia's criminal procedure ==
=== Colonial times ===
Before 1910, “Hukum Adat” or Adat laws applied in Indonesia. When the Dutch colonized Indonesia in 1910, they set up a civil law system that took precedence over the Adat laws. In terms of the criminal procedure, for example, the Dutch enacted two statutes to govern different parts of Indonesia. The Herziene Inlandsch/Indonesisch Reglement ("HIR") applied to Jawa and Madura, while the Rechtsreglement Buitengewesten ("Rbg") applied to the rest of Indonesia. The Adat laws applied to the natives only if it did not clash with the Dutch statutory provisions.

=== Japanese occupation ===
When the Japanese occupied Indonesia in March 1942, they applied their Japanese Martial Law. This superseded all existing laws in Indonesia at that time.

=== Present ===
Today, Indonesia's legal system is based on Dutch Colonial Law, Adat Law and National Law.

After Indonesia gained independence in August 1945, it adopted the Dutch HIR as its code of criminal procedure. In 1981, Indonesia replaced HIR with the KUHAP. The KUHAP improved upon the HIR by adding adversarial features to the criminal procedure. However, the KUHAP does not sufficiently protect human rights and its safeguards are often ignored in practice because there are no penalties for failing to comply with the Act. In response to dissatisfaction with the formal procedures in the Act, a working group drafted a new statue to replace the KUHAP in 2000. However, Indonesia has not adopted the working group's recommendations to date.

== Steps involved in an ordinary criminal trial ==
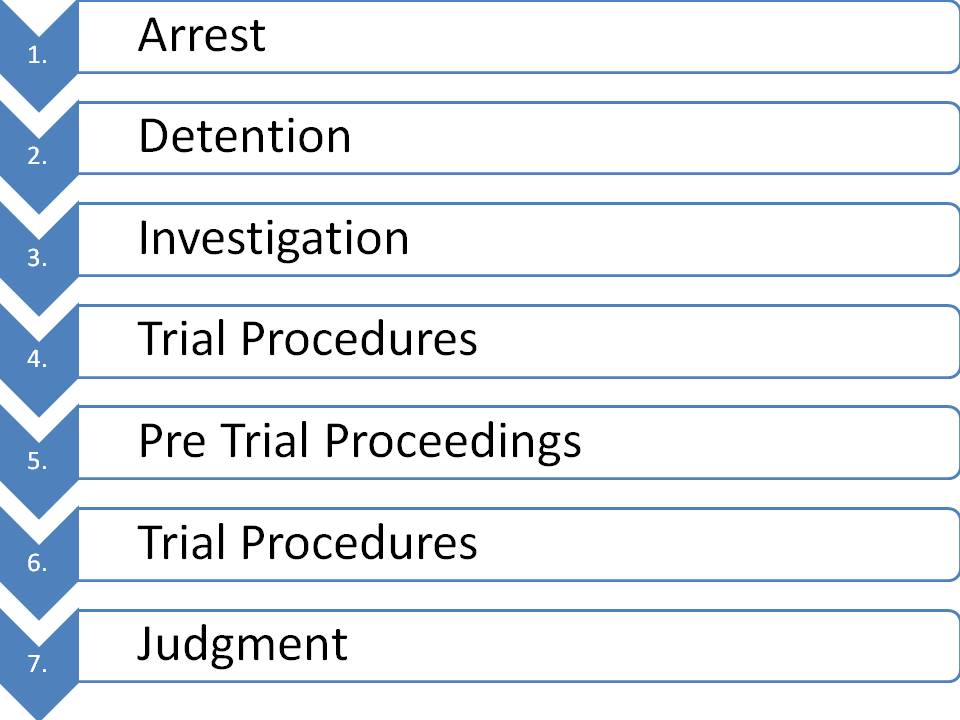
Criminal Trial Process in Indonesia

=== Arrest ===
The police must produce a warrant upon arrest if the suspect is not "caught in the act". They must also send a copy of such warrant to the suspect's family.

=== Detention ===
Suspects must be released within one day of arrest unless the investigator, prosecutor, or judge orders a detention. Detention is limited to offences liable to imprisonment of 5 years or more, and crimes under Art 21(4)(b). Suspects may be detained for a maximum of 60 days without judicial consent.

=== Investigation ===
Investigators must inform the public prosecutor before they begin their investigations. If the investigation is terminated due to insufficient evidence or if the event does not constitute an offence, investigators must inform the prosecutor and suspect.

During investigation, investigators have the authority to summon witnesses for examination.

When the investigation is completed, investigators must promptly submit the dossier of the case to the public prosecutor. If the public prosecutor believes that the investigation is incomplete, he will return the dossier and order for a supplementary investigation. The dossier is then resubmitted.

=== Prosecution ===
After examining the dossier of the case, the public prosecutor will determine if the case meets the requirements to be brought to court. If he decides to prosecute, he must prepare a Bill of Indictment and bring the action before an appropriate district court. Summonses will then be issued to the suspect and witnesses, if any, to attend trial.

If the public prosecutor decides to cease prosecution, he must produce a written decision to be sent to suspect, investigator, and the judge. Please refer to the appendix for more information about the structure of Indonesia's Public Prosecution Service.

=== Pre-trial proceedings ===
Pre-trial proceedings are limited to examining whether the arrest and/or detention was legal and to decide whether the district court has the jurisdiction to try the case.

=== Trial procedures ===
At the outset of trial, the prosecutor will read out the Bill of Indictment. The judge will then summon the accused and witnesses to give their testimonies, which will then be examined. The head judge will lead the examination at trial. The prosecutor and the legal counsel may question the witnesses through the head judge.

If an accused refuses to answer a question, the head judge will suggest that he answer and thereafter continue the examination.

After examination, the prosecutor will submit his charges before the accused submits his defence. The prosecutor may reply to the defences put up, provided that the accused has a right to reply. The head judge will then consult other judges on the bench before he reaches a decision.

=== Judgment ===
The court will acquit the accused if guilt has not been legally and convincingly proven or dismiss all charges if the acts do not constitute an offence.

If the court concludes that the accused is guilty of committing the offence, it will impose a punishment. The public prosecutor will then execute the judgment.

== The appeal process ==
=== Ordinary legal remedies ===
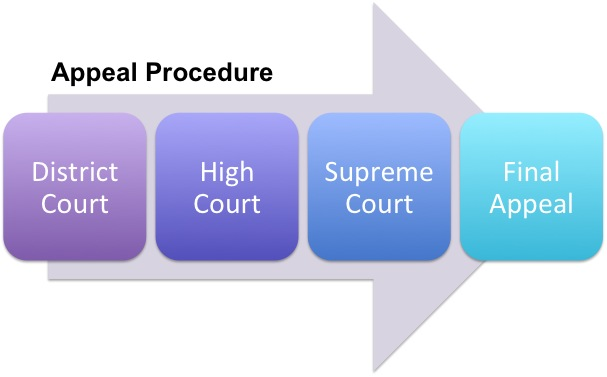
The Appeal Process

Once a decision has been reached and read by the judge in a General Court of first instance, the aggrieved party may file an appeal to the relevant court of appeal within seven days.

No appeal can be filed against a:

1. Judgment of acquittal that relates to an inappropriate application of law; or
2. Judgment of dismissal of all charges that relates to an inappropriate application of law; or
3. Judgment under express procedure. A judgment is made under express procedure when only one judge adjudicates the case because it is clear and minor.

There are three grounds for appealing to the High Court:

1. Where a law of procedure has been negligently applied;
2. Where a mistake is found in the examination at first instance;
3. Where something is incomplete in the examination at first instance.

After the High Court passes a judgment on an appeal, the aggrieved party can appeal to the Supreme Court as a matter of cassation.

There are three grounds for appealing to the Supreme Court:

1. Where a legal rule has not been applied or has been applied in an improper manner;
2. Where the method of adjudication was not concluded according to the provisions of law;
3. Where the court has exceeded the limits of its competence.

=== Extraordinary legal remedies ===
Judgments are final and binding at the last appellate level. However a convicted person or his family may seek a final extraordinary remedy by submitting a request to the Supreme Court for reconsideration of the judgment, except when it is a judgment of acquittal or the dismissal of charges. Such a request is not time-barred and may only be made once.

A request for reconsideration of a judgment may be made when:

1. New circumstances give rise to a strong presumption that had such circumstances been known during the trial, there would have been an acquittal or dismissal of all charges, or the charges of the public prosecutor would not have been acceptable, or that a less severe criminal provisions would have applied to the case.
2. Matters or circumstances that form the basis and reasoning of the judgment are declared contradictory.
3. A judgment clearly displays a mistake made by the judge or a manifest error.
4. An alleged act which has been declared proven in the judgment, but has not been followed up by the imposition of a penalty.

== Role of the judge ==
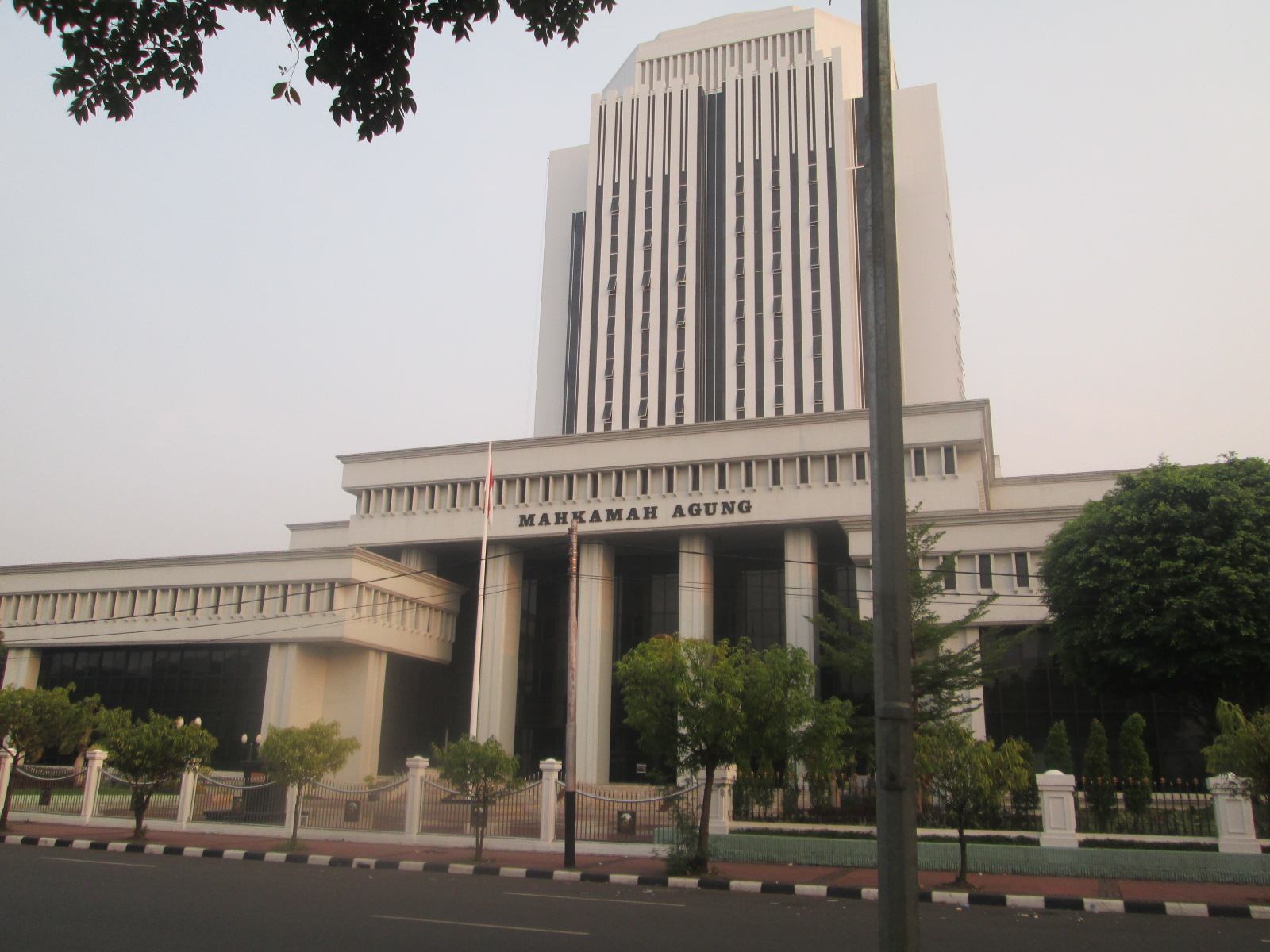
Indonesia Supreme Court

The role of judges in the Indonesian criminal justice system is to impose a proper punishment on offenders based on a sufficient means of legal proof. Judges are generally only involved in the trial proceedings.

When a judge receives a Bill of Indictment from the Public Prosecutor, he will determine a trial date and order the latter to summon the accused and witnesses to attend the trial.

During the trial proceedings, the judge is obliged to ensure that the defendant or witness remains free to answer the questions posed. If the judge fails to do so, his decision will be annulled.

At the end of the trial proceedings, the judge can only convict a person if he has at least two pieces of legal evidence supporting the conviction. Based on the evidence presented, the judge can punish, acquit or dismiss the charges against the accused.

If the accused is convicted and he is sentenced to a punishment that deprives him of his liberty, the judge will assist the head judge to supervise the execution of the punishment.

== Role of the prosecutors ==
The Public Prosecution Service of Indonesia is the only agency that has state powers to prosecute offenders. As such, there is no private prosecution in the Indonesian criminal justice system.

Prosecutors are involved in the whole trial process, from the investigations, to trial proceedings and the execution of punishment. At the investigation stage, the prosecutor supervises the police's investigations. The prosecutor only personally investigates cases when there are special crimes, such as corruption. Once the police complete investigations, they hand the evidence to the prosecutor. If the evidence is satisfactory, the prosecutor will prosecute the offender at an appropriate court. He will prepare a Bill of Indictment for the judge to begin the trial proceedings.

During the trial proceedings, the prosecutor must ensure that the defendant, witnesses and experts are all present. The prosecutor must also present all evidence concerning the crime. In practice, the prosecutor usually presents three or more pieces of legal evidence to support the defendant's guilt.

After the judge has passed judgment on the case, the judge's clerk will send a copy of the execution of punishment to the prosecutor. The prosecutor will then execute the punishment.

== Legal protections for the accused ==
=== Rights to counsel ===
A suspect has a right to obtain legal assistance from one or more legal counsels at every stage of the examination. At the start of the investigations, the police will inform the suspect of his right to receive legal assistance during examination at trial.

If the suspect does not have legal assistance, he will receive free legal aid if he faces the death penalty, or imprisonment of fifteen years or more. The suspect will also receive free legal aid if he is destitute and faces imprisonment of five year or more.

Once the suspect obtains legal assistance, the counsel has a right to contact him from the moment he is arrested or detained. The counsel also has a right to be present at, and listen to, interrogations. This ensures that the police do not carry out unfair interrogation techniques.

=== Rules of evidence ===
The court only admits five types of legal evidence. They are:

1. The testimony of a witness
2. The testimony of an expert
3. A document
4. An indication
5. The testimony of the accused

In terms of the witness' testimony as a means of legal proof, the judge will compare a witness’ testimony against other witness testimonies or other means of proof to determine whether the testimony is true. In the process, he also considers all other factors that affect the witness’ credibility. A witness usually makes a testimony under oath. However, a testimony not made under oath can still be admitted as supplemental legal evidence if it is consistent with a testimony made under oath.

As for an indication as a means of legal proof, an indication is an act, event, or situation that is consistent with other facts. It can only be obtained from the testimony of a witness or accused, or from a document.

To convict an accused, a judge must have at least two means of legal proof to support the charge. This ensures that a suspect cannot be convicted merely because he confessed his guilt.

== Current controversies and debates ==
=== Problems concerning evidence ===
Indonesian courts only acc have a clear provision on the admissibility of illegally obtained evidence. Hence, the prosecution can present evidence that was obtained through torture, ill-treatment, or contrary to any provision in the KUHAP. Furthermore, there is no judicial avenue for an accused to seek redress if illegal evidence were presented at trial. This undermines the legal safeguards in the KUHAP.

=== Restricted rights to counsel ===
Counsel has a right to contact his client “at every moment.” However, this right is undermined because a 1983 Ministry of Justice regulation interprets the phrase to mean that the client has a right to communicate with his counsel ‘at every moment during office hours’. Based on this, police stations mysteriously close when lawyers visit their clients. This prevents the counsel from communicating with his client, undermining the suspect's right to counsel.

=== Abuse of detention powers ===
The police can abuse its powers to detain a suspect by using threats of detention to pressure a suspect to confess that he is guilty. In addition, the KUHAP does not ensure that detainees are brought to court promptly. Under the KUHAP, a suspect can be detained for up to 60 days without judicial intervention. For example, if the police detains a suspect for 20 days under Art24(1), a prosecutor can extend this detention for another 40 days under Art 24(2). Please refer to the appendix for more information about how long a suspect can be detained without judicial intervention.

=== Fictional right to silence ===
Finally, it is unclear whether an accused has a right to remain silent during examination. Although an accused “shall not be burdened with the duty of giving evidence”, Art 175 seems to undermine this right. Under Art 175, the head judge can suggest that the accused answers the question. The examination will continue after the head judge makes this suggestion. However, since there is a high respect for authority in Indonesia, the head judge's “suggestion” will probably persuade the accused to answer the question. This undermines the right to remain silent during examination.

== See also ==
- Indonesian Criminal Code
- Law of Indonesia
- Constitution of Indonesia
- Outline of Indonesia
- Civil law (legal system)
