= Ahmad Fadlil Sumadi =

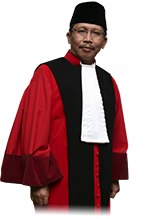

Justice on the Constitutional Court of Indonesia
- In office 2010 – 6 January 2015
- President: Susilo Bambang Yudhoyono

Personal details
- Citizenship: Indonesian

Ahmad Fadlil Sumadi is a former judge on the Constitutional Court of Indonesia. Sumadi initially served as the registrar of the Constitutional Court between 2003 and 2008, then served as the deputy chief justice of the High Court of Yogyakarta before the Supreme Court of Indonesia appointed him to the Constitutional Court in 2010.

Although Sumadi has a strong background in sharia law and has served on several religious courts, he was not known for taking the lead on cases before the Constitutional Court regarding Islamic law. He did provide a dissenting opinion in regard to the Government of Indonesia's purchase of 7% of the Newmont Mining Corporation, ruling that the government didn't need to consult the People's Representative Council prior to the purchase. Sumadi was also the chairman of one of three panels set up by the Constitutional Court to investigate former presidential candidate Prabowo Subianto Djojohadikusumo's complaint in the Indonesian presidential election, 2014, serving on the panel alongside fellow justices Maria Farida Indrati and Aswanto. Sumadi was one of several justices who were angered and amused by the claims of Subianto's witnesses, cornering at least one witness until the man confessed to not having been present at polling stations where he claimed irregularities had taken place.
