= Civil Code of Indonesia =

Laws in Indonesia

States General of the Netherlands
- Long title: Burgerlijk Wetboek voor Indonesië; Kitab Undang-Undang Hukum Perdata
- Citation: Staatsblad No. 23 of 1847
- Territorial extent: Indonesia
- Enacted by: States General of the Netherlands
- Royal assent: 30 April 1847
- Commenced: 1 January 1848
- Status: In force

The Civil Code of Indonesia (Dutch: Burgerlijk Wetboek van Indonesië, BW), commonly known in Indonesian as Kitab Undang-Undang Hukum Perdata (lit. 'Law Book of Civil Code', also abbreviated as KUH Perdata), are the laws and regulations that form the basis of civil law in Indonesia. Civil law in Indonesia originates from Napoleonic civil law, and is codified through Staatsblaad number 23 of 1847.

== History ==
The civil code that is presently known as the Napoleonic Code was enacted in 1804 during Napoleon's rule of France. On 24 May 1806 the Netherlands became a French client state led by Napoleon's brother, Louis Bonaparte, who was instructed to receive and enact the Napoleonic Code. On 1 January 1811, the Netherlands was annexed by the French Empire and the Napoleonic Code was adopted in unmodified form. Dutch independence was restored with the collapse of French rule in 1813 in which the Kingdom once again pursued codification. Article 100 of the 1814 Constitution refers to a codification based on Dutch law in which various proposals were made between 1816 and 1830. Finally in 1830 a new code was enacted by Parliament which was mainly influenced by French and Roman-Dutch law.

== Relevance to Indonesia ==
Until 1918, Indonesia was then a Dutch colony with no legislature, which meant that all laws enacted by the Dutch Parliament were immediately, unless otherwise stated, implemented in the Dutch East Indies. Burgerlijk Wetboek was then modified by the Dutch East Indies government to apply exclusively to Europeans and "Foreign Orientals". However, it was not replaced after the 1945 Indonesian Constitution was enacted and as such legally remains part of Indonesian law under Article 2 of the transitional provisions of the Constitution, which allowed for Dutch East Indies-era laws to remain in force so long as they had not been amended or replaced in accordance with the Constitution. At present, various new laws and regulations have been created for several provisions which were previously proscribed within BW, such as those relating to land, mortgage rights, and fiduciary.

== Legal challenges ==
In 1962, the Supreme Court of Indonesia put forward a notion through a circular letter a quo for BW to not be considered as a law, but as a document that described a group of unwritten laws. Although in principle, BW should only apply to Europeans and "Foreign Orientals", norms contained in BW are often used by judges in deciding civil disputes between indigenous Pribumi.

Through the 2006 Citizenship Act (c.12), racial segregation was considered invalid, whereby the Indonesian government only recognised the subgroupings of Indonesian "citizens" and "foreigners". These provisions often became a challenge as the previous definition of racial segregation based on Article 131 jo. 163 of the Dutch East Indies constitution (Indische Staatsregeling) is still present in parts of Dutch-inherited law, yet this constitution itself is no longer in force as it was replaced with the Indonesian constitution.
