= Wet Algemene Bepalingen =

Dutch law

The Wet van 15 mei 1829, houdende algemeene bepalingen der wetgeving van het Koningrijk (English Law from 15 may 1829, holding general decrees from the legislation of the Kingdom, short name Wet algemene bepalingen) is a principal law of the Netherlands containing a number of basic precepts pertaining to the applicability of the law in general. It is considered part of the body of constitutional law of the Netherlands, which is composed primarily of Constitution of the Netherlands and the Charter for the Kingdom of the Netherlands.

== History ==
The Wet algemene bepalingen was developed by a legal advisory committee instituted by the Dutch King William I in 1814. It was originally intended to be part of the "General Definitions and Decrees" section of the new Dutch Civil Law, which William I intended to replace the Napoleonic Code left over from the French occupation of the Netherlands which had ended in 1813. Both laws were thus drafted at the same time. However, 1815 saw the start of a long period of political discord among the committee members and later the States-General of the Netherlands. This discord had two primary causes:

- First, the different committees working on parts of the new bodies of law could not agree upon reforming the Napoleonic code or returning to pre-Batavian Republic common law (the primary body of civil law).
- Second, the addition of the Southern Netherlands to the Northern Netherlands by the Congress of Vienna brought in a lot of new legal scholars and politicians who preferred Napoleonic law over Dutch common law, quite against the wishes of William I.

Despite attempts of several parties (including the King), the Southern Dutch dominated parliament rejected the new law in 1822 and pushed for a reformed Napoleonic law. As part of this transformation of the civil law book the "general precepts of law" were split off into a new law, the 1829 Wet Algemene Bepalingen. This law was passed on 15 May 1829 but did not enter into force until October 1, 1838 together with the Civil Law. Ironically, the delay was caused by the Belgian Revolution in which the Southern Netherlands forcibly split off from the kingdom.

The Wet algemene bepalingen has since proven to be quite a stable law. It is currently one of the oldest laws still in force in the Netherlands, and remains mostly unchanged from its first version. It has been changed three times in its existence (first time in 1988), always to move precepts into the Constitution or another law.

== Contents ==
The Wet algemene bepalingen, or Law on general precepts and regulations introduces some basic rules for the applicability of laws throughout the Kingdom. It lays out the foundations for which laws relate to people and land, plus how the judicial power is supposed to behave.

=== Current precepts ===
Ex post facto and changing of the law
Article 4 determines that the law is only applicable after it is passed, not before (ex post facto law). Article 5 states that all laws remain in force until repealed or amended by a new law.
Personal over territorial applicability of laws
Article 6 determines that legal rights and responsibilities pertaining to Dutch citizens and the state hold, even if the citizen is abroad.
Territorial applicability of laws
Article 8 determines that the criminal law of the Netherlands applies to all those who are within its borders.
Universal and territorial applicability of civil law
Article 9 determines that Dutch civil law applies equally to citizens and foreigners in the Netherlands, unless explicitly stated by law.
Primacy of territories' law
Article 10 determines that any countries' law is applicable to that country (Dutch law has no primacy in foreign countries).
No court-made law
Article 11 determines that a judge must follow the law in his rulings and may not consider "inner value" or "reason within" the law (i.e. a judge must apply the law as it is written — he may not decide to do something else because he disagrees with the law or feels it is badly written). Article 12 states that judges may not render verdicts in the form of a general decree, disposition or regulation (i.e. judges cannot make general rules, but only rule on specific cases).
Right to ruling of the court
Article 13 determines that the court must rule in all cases; no judge may refuse to render verdict by claiming a lack of law, insufficiency or unclarity of law and can be prosecuted if he does.
Rule of international law
Article 13a limits the power of judges and official acts to within the bounds set by international law.

=== Previous precepts ===
No law is valid unless it is publicly accessible
Article 1 determined that no law would take effect before it had been properly proclaimed. Article 2 stated that all law is equally applicable throughout the kingdom, valid once it has been proclaimed throughout the entire Kingdom (i.e. all citizens of the Kingdom can know about it) and enters into force 20 days after official publication in the Staatscourant unless otherwise determined in that law. Articles 1 and 2 were rescinded on February 17, 1988 and their regulations were moved to the Constitution.
No common law
Article 3 determined that there is no uncodified law in the Netherlands: there is law and not common law, unless the law explicitly leaves room for it. This article was rescinded on January 1, 1992 and incorporated into the Civil Law books.
Public decency cannot be subverted
Article 14 determined that laws pertaining to public decency or order cannot be subverted or undone by any manner of act or common agreement. This article was rescinded on January 1, 1992 and incorporated into Book II of the Civil Law.
Real estate is ruled by territorial law
Article 7 determined that the law applicable to real estate was the law of the territory in which that real estate was located. This article was rescinded on May 1, 2008 and incorporated into other laws.
