= Journalism and freedom =

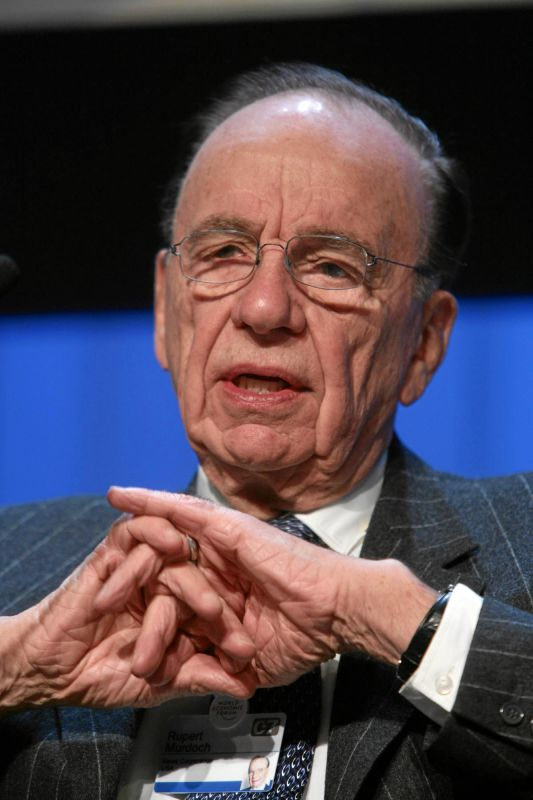
Rupert Murdoch – World Economic Forum Annual Meeting Davos 2007

"Journalism and Freedom" was an article by Rupert Murdoch that appeared in The Wall Street Journal's online Opinion Journal on 8 December 2009.

"Journalism and Freedom" was adapted from a speech given by Murdoch (Chairman and CEO of News Corporation) at the Federal Trade Commission's Workshop on Journalism and the Internet, held on 1 December 2009. In this article Murdoch discusses his views on government involvement in the press in the form of subsidies, the outdated "20th century business models" of newspapers which rely on advertising revenues and the detrimental effects these have on creators of established news content and the newspaper industry as a whole. He also argues that government funding compromises independent journalism and is a greater threat to a competitive and unbiased press than digital technologies are. Also discussed is the impact of internet search engines and open content news material available online and new methods and models of content delivery portal electronic devices and media (e-readers, smart phones, laptops) and how this will affect delivery of news content in the future.

The debate surrounding "Journalism and Freedom" has focused on the threat of new technologies, and the role that they play in the decline of traditional newspapers. Murdoch does not blame new technologies for the decline of newspapers, rather the lack of regulation which allows journalists content to be used without payment. He sees the opportunities technologies can bring, creating a much wider audience for newspapers. Opinions have also been voiced concerning government interventions and the suitability of these as a way of rescuing the industry. Other revenue and business models have been proposed as an alternative to existing ones, as traditional models are failing.

== Decline of the industry ==
A report in 2009 highlighted the decline of newspaper circulation as figures showed that the industry as a whole sold fewer newspapers than at any other time since the 1940s. Within the report, free online content and business models were blamed for their part in the downturn; an opinion in agreement with Murdoch's article. The Wall Street Journal's circulation in 2009 defied the trend as their circulation rose 0.6% and in 2010 they topped the list of circulating figures for American newspapers . The Journal sells online subscriptions, which is seen as a reason for their success.

== Revenue models ==
Traditional print based media relies heavily upon advertisements and classified adverts for the generation of the majority of their revenue, which accounts for upwards of three quarters of total income. This subsidy covers the expensive printing and distribution costs of the publication which was estimated to be between 30-40% and 11% respectively of total operating costs in 2006. Although online advertisements revenue have overtaken their print counterparts recently, the vast majority of this is spent on search engines and pay-per-click content rather than more traditional advertising on news websites such as banners.

Users do not appear willing to pay for general digital news content. Publications such as The New York Times have launched premium subscription based content TimeSelect in the past but uptake was low and it was eventually removed, but this is not to say that users will never pay for content, yet as of now it has not been successful for a mainstream publication as a method of generating revenue. James Jarvis, an American journalist, stated that "TimesSelect is dead...with it goes any hope of charging for content online, Content is now and forever free". One reason for this is that there is an abundance of free sources online for news, therefore few users will feel the need to pay for content that is available without charge elsewhere. Murdoch states that it is his belief that users in the future will indeed be willing to pay for digital news if the content is worthy, which is evident in the recent launch of The Daily, an iPad-only daily newspaper which sells at 99 cents (US) per week. In the UK, The Times newspaper (also owned by Murdoch) saw its readership decline by 90% in 2010 after it introduced a paywall. In response to Murdoch's article, Kathy Gill claims that customers will not pay for content that is available elsewhere for free and that there needs to be a distinction made between what they will and won't pay for. There are also claims of hypocrisy in what Murdoch says as The Wall Street Journal has been criticised for not providing links to competitors in their own articles.

== Attracting readers ==
The globalisation of media and the new formats available are seen by Murdoch as an opportunity and the increased competition created good for consumers. People no longer want to be restricted by one format so newspapers must adapt their delivery models. Murdoch states that the customer base newspapers already have is an advantage as they can attract readers equally to their online versions. The standard of journalism is also likely to be more professional. Murdoch's vision of the future for newspapers online is that if readers are targeted and the content offered is of a high quality, people will be willing to pay for it.

== Technology ==
As Murdoch states, readers use different technology platforms to access news content. Portable devices with considerably better processors, such as smartphones, laptops and tablet PCs which has made the gathering and dissemination of information much easier and increased the connection possibilities of news content which can be accessed by a larger number of people. Availability of news has now become considerably more selective and flexible in terms of where it can be accessed. This means that it is likely that those who seek online news will consume more news in general as those who purchase the physical copy of the newspaper will be more and not less likely to access the same publications website. Murdoch states that adherence to business models based upon advertising on the part of news papers is responsible for declining revenues. Additionally, those who consume a lot of news offline will access online news more frequently. This, he argues, means that journalists and readers alike have perhaps been able to research more thoroughly using search engines, stumbling serendipitously upon sources online which they may not have encountered in an analogue environment. This has given rise to new challenges for media organisations in terms of delivering content to users. .

It is debatable whether online and offline news content are competing or complementary products. Some argue that the Internet presents too much competition for traditional newspapers. In terms of trust, there is also an assumption that news content delivered online may be inferior to content delivered by newspapers. However, there is also the issue of users finding online content less trust worthy. This could be linked to it being free and assumption that online news content is possibly less likeable, satisfying and enjoyable. However, as the article discuss, technology is not necessarily the cause of the decline in revenues from traditional news paper formats. Others. like Google CEO Eric Schmidt say that technology is definitely not to blame and can actually help newspapers to progress and avoid decline. Obsolescence of single delivery format is unlikely as both print and online serve different purposes and audiences.

== Content creators and aggregators ==
Murdoch also attacks news aggregator services, which he sees as being parasitic in that they are benefiting from news which they have not created or contributed to in any way. This refers to news websites who gather content for users, which allow them to access news stories on multiple sources, often on one specified area or topic of interest in order to save them time and effort but also blogs and even websites such as Yahoo! News and MSN. He comments that this it is particularly unfair to edit and rewrite articles that journalists have invested their time and effort in, especially in cases when they are not cited as being the original author or plagiarised. He challenges that this kind of behaviour constitutes fair use and that those who do not contribute or create the news content that they publish on their websites or blogs can profit from the efforts of the aforementioned journalist while adding very little themselves. Also that this current practice cannot continue indefinitely. Murdoch's statements were attacked by Huffington Post founder Arianna Huffington stating that "Murdoch confused aggregation with wholesale misappropriation". She argued that aggregation was not misappropriation and that most journalists liked the traffic consequently driven to them. Also, Murdoch's own companies were as guilty for aggregating content like the political tracker on Fox News.com and the Rotten Tomatoes web site.

== Government intervention ==
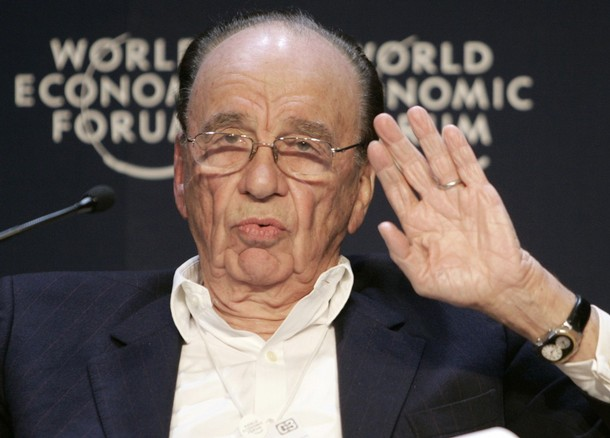
Rupert Murdoch, 12 January 2009

The level of financial support for newspapers from the American Government is decreasing and some believe this is a factor in the decline of the traditional newspaper industry. One instance of where governments have withdrawn from the industry came with the rise of e-government, bringing about less of a need for local authorities to pay for advertising space in newspapers.

There is a debate between those who are calling for more government funding to support the industry and others who believe this would be contrary to free speech and create unfair competition. Similar examinations are occurring in other countries as countries like Austria, France Norway and Sweden are looking to change their current subsidy models. It is possible for news organisations to receive public money and still maintain neutrality, most notably, the BBC. Tension also exists between direct subsidies like help with printing, distribution, research, and training, and indirect subsidies like tax concessions. Indirect subsidies are a more common model of government intervention.

Changes in government legislation is seen as another option. The example of the U.S. auto industry has been brought up to demonstrate that the newspaper industry needs more than financing to survive. Murdoch asserts that newspapers themselves need to look at new ways of surviving, competing and generating revenue as government financing merely "props up those who are producing things that customers do not want". As Murdoch suggests, new business models need to be created and the industry – along with government - needs to be more proactive. Better legislation concerning newspapers and for the protection of newspapers is, says Murdoch, the best way to ensure the future of quality journalism.

Legislation was introduced in 2009 by senator Ben Cardin of Maryland to help struggling newspapers. Under section 501(c) of the U.S. tax code, newspapers could become nonprofits and thus benefit from tax breaks similar to those awarded to charities, and educational and cultural nonprofits. So far, the bill has not progressed in Congress and it is questioned whether newspapers with existing debt would be able to be saved by this.

The Federal Trade Commission (FTC) is also looking into protecting newspapers through policy. New ways of generating revenue, greater protection of intellectual property (an area Murdoch expresses concern about), a redefining of "fair use", and potential areas of government intervention are discussed in the FTC's Potential Policy Recommendations to support the reinvention of Journalism.

There is also a case for no intervention at all, and that newspapers must find their own way. If this results in some of them ceasing to exist, this is merely the reflection of the market. It may also encourage newspapers to find their own way of dealing with the downturn, perhaps through greater emphasis on collaboration with each other.

Murdoch's article calls for the government to reassess its regulation of news corporation ownership and copyright legislation. He believes that the governments role should be to protect the intellectual property of the newspapers and their journalists, get rid of regulations which hinder investment, and not restrict Cross ownership in the media. The relaxing of regulation could lead to less choice for consumers. American news is dominated by 5 corporations (including Murdoch's) and a change in cross-ownership rules could hinder other news companies from prospering.
