= Naek L. Tobing =

Indonesian physician and sexologist (1940–2020)

Naek Lumban Tobing
- Born: 14 August 1940; Residency of Tapanuli, Dutch East Indies
- Died: 6 April 2020 (aged 79); Jakarta, Indonesia
- Other names: Naek L. Tobing
- Occupation(s): physician, sexologist, and author
- Known for: filling sexology rubrics in various national magazines and newspapers

Naek Lumban Tobing (August 14, 1940 – April 6, 2020) was an Indonesian physician, sexologist and author. He wrote Problems and Solutions (1994) and Premarital Sex, Extramarital Sex, and Building Marital Harmony.

Often appearing to fill sexology rubrics in various national magazines and newspapers. In addition, he was often invited as a speaker in a health rubric program related to sexology issues at various television and radio stations throughout Indonesia.

He was born on Samosir Island, Tapanuli. He was married to Marion Aritonang and had 6 children.

He earned a medical degree from The University of North Sumatra in 1966, and psychiatrist degree from The University of Indonesia in 1976. He also earned certified sex educator from The University of Minnesota in 1983.

He died at the Pertamina Central Hospital, Jakarta, on April 6, 2020 aged 79 due to COVID-19.
