= Indonesian Penal Code =

Defunct criminal Code of Indonesia and former Dutch East Indies

States General of the Netherlands
- Long title: Wetboek van Strafrecht; Kitab Undang-Undang Hukum Pidana
- Citation: Stb. 1915, 732.
- Territorial extent: Dutch East Indies and then Indonesia
- Enacted by: Volksraad of the Dutch East Indies
- Royal assent: 15 October 1915
- Commenced: 1 January 1918
- Repealed: 2 January 2026

Amends
- Wetboek van Strafrecht voor Nederlandsch-Indië (Staatsblad 1915: 732); Criminal Code Act No. 1 of 1946; Criminal Code for the Entire Territory of the Republic of Indonesia and the Amendment of Such Code Act No. 73 of 1958

Amended by
- Indonesian House of Representatives

Repealed by
- Act No. 1 of 2023

Related legislation
- Act No. 8 of 1951; Act No. 73 of 1958; Act No. 1 of 1960; Presidential Decree No. 16 of 1960; Presidential Decree No. 18 of 1960; Act No. 8 of 1961; Act No. 7 of 1974; Act No. 4 of 1976; Act No. 27 of 1999
- Status: Repealed

The Indonesian Penal Code (Dutch: Wetboek van Strafrecht, WvS), commonly known in Indonesian as Kitab Undang-Undang Hukum Pidana (lit. 'Law Book of Penal Code', derived from Dutch), abbreviated as KUH Pidana or KUHP), were laws and regulations that form the basis of criminal law in Indonesia. By deviating as necessary from Presidential Regulation dated 10 October 1945 No. 2, it stipulated that the criminal law regulations that are in effect were the Dutch criminal law regulations that existed on 8 March 1942. Currently, the Republic of Indonesia has its own Criminal Code, which came into effect in 2026.

== History ==
The Criminal Code, also known in Indonesian as KUHP or in Dutch as Wetboek van Strafrecht, are laws and regulations that regulate criminal acts in Indonesia. The Criminal Code that is currently in force is the Criminal Code which originates from Dutch colonial law, namely Wetboek van Strafrecht voor Nederlands-Indië. The ratification was carried out through the Staatsblad of 1915 number 732 and came into effect on 1 January 1918. After Indonesian independence from the Dutch in 1945, the Criminal Code is retained and are enforced by an alignment of conditions in the form of revocation of articles that were no longer relevant. This is based on the Transitional Provisions of Article II of the 1945 Constitution, which states that: "All existing state bodies and regulations are immediately enforced as long as new ones have not been enacted according to this Constitution." It was these provisions that later became the legal basis for the enforcement of all statutory regulations during the colonial period to the independence period.

To reaffirm the enforcement of criminal law during those colonial period, on 26 February 1946, the government then issued Law Number 1 of 1946 concerning Criminal Law Regulations. This law was then used as the legal basis for changing "Wetboek van Strafrecht voor Nederlands-Indië" to "Wetboek van Strafrecht" (WvS), which became known as the Indonesian Criminal Code. Nevertheless, in Article XVII of the act, there is also a provision which states that: "This law shall take effect for the islands of Java and Madura on the day it is announced and for other regions on the day to be determined by the President." Thus, the application of Wetboek van Strafrecht voor Nederlands-Indië to Wetboek van Strafrecht is only limited to the regions of Java and Madura. The enactment of the Criminal Code throughout the territory of the Republic of Indonesia was only carried out on 20 September 1958, with the promulgation of Law no. 73 of 1958 declaring the Applicability of Law Number 1 of 1946 of the Republic of Indonesia in regards to Criminal Law Regulations for the Entire Territory of the Republic of Indonesia, and thus amending the Criminal Code. As stated in Article 1 of Law no. 7 of 1958 which reads: "Law No. 1 of 1946 of the Republic of Indonesia concerning Criminal Law Regulations declared applicable to the entire territory of the Republic of Indonesia.

== Books and chapters ==
First Book: on General Provisions
Chapters No.	Chapters (in English)	Chapters (in Indonesian)	Articles
I	Extent of Operations of the Statutory Criminal Provisions	Batas-batas Berlakunya Aturan Pidana dalam Perundang-undangan	Art. 1-9
II	Criminal Punishments	Pidana	Art. 10-43
III	Exclusion, Mitigation, and Enhancement of Criminal Punishments	Hal-hal yang Menghapuskan, Mengurangi atau Memberatkan Pidana	Art. 44-52a
IV	Attempts to Commit Criminal Actions	Percobaan	Art. 53-54
V	Participation in Criminal Actions	Penyertaan dalam Tindak Pidana	Art. 55-62
VI	Conjunction in Criminal Actions	Perbarengan Tindak Pidana	Art. 63-71
VII	Filing and Withdrawing of Complaints for Crimes Prosecuted only upon Complaint	Mengajukan dan Menarik Kembali Pengaduan dalam Hal Kejahatan-kejahatan yang Hanya Dituntut atas Pengaduan	Art. 72-75
VIII	Lapse of Authority to Prosecute and to Carry Out Criminal Punishments	Hapusnya Kewenangan Menuntut Pidana dan Menjalankan Pidana	Art. 76-85
IX	Terminologies Used in the Criminal Code	Istilah-istilah dalam KUHP	Art. 86-102
-	Concluding Provisions	Aturan Penutup	Art. 103

Second Book: on Crimes
Chapters No.	Chapters (in English)	Chapters (in Indonesian)	Articles
I	Crimes Against State Security	Kejahatan Terhadap Keamanan Negara	Art. 104-129
II	Crimes Against Dignity of the President and the Vice President	Kejahatan-kejahatan Terhadap Martabat Presiden dan Wakil Presiden	Art. 130-139
III	Crimes Against Cordial Foreign States, Their Leaders, and Their Agents	Kejahatan-kejahatan Terhadap Negara Sahabat dan Terhadap Kepala Negara Sahabat Serta Wakilnya	Art. 139a-145
IV	Crimes Against Performance of State Duties and Rights	Kejahatan Terhadap Melakukan Kewajiban dan Hak Kenegaraan	Art. 146-153
V	Crimes Against Public Order	Kejahatan Terhadap Ketertiban Umum	Art. 153-181
VI	Fighting Challenges	Perkelahian Tanding	Art. 182-186
VII	Crimes Against Safety of Other Persons and Property	Kejahatan yang Membahayakan Keamanan Umum bagi Orang atau Barang	Art. 187-206
VIII	Crimes Against Public Authority	Kejahatan Terhadap Penguasa Umum	Art. 207-241
IX	Perjury and False Testimony	Sumpah Palsu dan Keterangan Palsu	Art. 242-243
X	Counterfeit of Currencies and Banknotes	Pemalsuan Mata Uang dan Uang Kertas	Art. 244-252
XI	Forgeries of Seals and Marks	Pemalsuan Meterai dan Merek	Art. 253-262
XII	Forgeries of Documents	Pemalsuan Surat	Art. 263-276
XIII	Crimes Against Persons' Origins and Marriage	Kejahatan Terhadap Asal-Usul dan Perkawinan	Art. 277-280
XIV	Crimes Against Decency	Kejahatan Terhadap Kesusilaan	Art. 281-303
XV	Failure over Duty to Rescue	Meninggalkan Orang yang Perlu Ditolong	Art. 304-309
XVI	Defamations	Penghinaan	Art. 310-321
XVII	Revelations of Secrets	Membuka Rahasia	Art. 322-323
XVIII	Crimes Against Personal Liberty	Kejahatan Terhadap Kemerdekaan Orang	Art. 324-337
XIX	Crimes Against Life	Kejahatan Terhadap Nyawa	Art. 338-350
XX	Mistreatment	Penganiayaan	Art. 351-358
XXI	Causing Death or Bodily Harm due to Negligence	Menyebabkan Mati atau Luka-luka Karena Kealpaan	Art. 359-361
XXII	Theft	Pencurian	Art. 362-367
XXIII	Extortion and Blackmail	Pemerasan dan Pengancaman	Art. 368-371
XXIV	Embezzlement	Penggelapan	Art. 372-377
XXV	Fraud	Perbuatan Curang	Art. 378-395
XXVI	Injury to Creditors or Rightful Claimants	Perbuatan Merugikan Pemiutang atau Orang yang Mempunyai Hak	Art. 396-405
XXVII	Property Damage or Destruction	Menghancurkan atau Merusakkan Barang	Art. 406-412
XXVIII	Crimes by Officials	Kejahatan Jabatan	Art. 413-478
XXIX	Maritime Crimes	Kejahatan Pelayaran	Art. 438-479
XXIX-A	Aviation Crimes Crimes and Against Aviation Facilities and Infrastructure	Kejahatan Penerbangan dan Kejahatan Terhadap Sarana/Prasarana Penerbangan	Art. 479a-479r
XXX	Possession of Stolen Goods, as well as Crimes in Publication and Prints	Penadahan Penerbitan dan Percetakan	Art. 480-485
XXXI	Provisions Relating to Recidivism	Aturan tentang Pengulangan Kejahatan yang Bersangkutan dengan Berbagai-bagai Bab	Art. 486-488

Third Book: on Misdemeanors
Chapters No.	Chapters (in English)	Chapters (in Indonesian)	Articles
I	Misdemeanors Against Persons, Property, and Public Health	Tentang Pelanggaran Keamanan Umum bagi Orang atau Barang dan Kesehatan	Art. 489-502
II	Misdemeanors Against Public Order	Pelanggaran Ketertiban Umum	Art. 503-520
III	Misdemeanors Against Public Authority	Pelanggaran Terhadap Penguasa Umum	Art. 521-528
IV	Misdemeanors Against Persons' Origins and Marriage	Pelanggaran Mengenai Asal-Usul dan Perkawinan	Art. 529-530
V	Misdemeanors Against the Duty to Rescue	Pelanggaran Terhadap Orang yang Memerlukan Pertolongan	Art. 531
VI	Misdemeanors Against Decency	Pelanggaran Kesusilaan	Art. 532-547
VII	Misdemeanors Concerning Land, Vegetations, and Premises	Pelanggaran Mengenai Tanah, Tanaman dan Pekarangan	Art. 548-551
VIII	Misdemeanors by Officials	Pelanggaran Jabatan	Art. 552-559
IX	Misdemeanors in Navigation	Pelanggaran Pelayaran	Art. 560-569

== Revision ==
=== Article of witchcraft ===
Article 293 of the Draft Criminal Code reads:

(1). Everyone who declares himself to have supernatural powers, expresses hope, offers or provides assistance to other people that because of his actions can cause illness, death, mental or physical suffering of a person, shall be punished with imprisonment for a maximum of 5 (five) years or at most a category IV fine. (2). If the perpetrator of the crime referred to in paragraph (1) commits the act to seek profit or make it a livelihood or habit, then the sentence can be increased by 1/3 (one third).

Criminal law expert Barda Nawawi Arief, who took part in drafting the policy, said that this article is an extension of Article 162 of the Criminal Code which regulates the prohibition of assisting in criminal acts, which reads "Anyone who publicly orally or in writing offers to provide information, opportunity, or means to commit a criminal act, shall be punished with imprisonment for a maximum of 9 months or a fine of up to Rp. 400,500."

Although political figure Eva Sundari of the PDI-P party thinks that the law will find it difficult to prove someone has the power of witchcraft, so much so that this article is prone to criminalization, criminal law expert from the University of Indonesia, Andi Hamzah, says that the proof does not require the pleader to bring a supernatural experts or priest, but to only bring witnesses who hear that someone claims to be capable of practicing witchcraft.

The pros and cons of the witchcraft act have appeared since the 1990s. Because of this, to deepened the understanding of the article on witchcraft, the People's Representative Council (DPR) conducted a comparative study to the Netherlands, the United Kingdom, France, and Russia.

== Withdrawal ==
On 6 December 2022, the People's Representative Council voted to approve a new criminal code for Indonesia on the basis of decolonization, which repeals the old criminal code and its amendments. Initially, the new code was supposed to pass in 2019, yet amid a mass street demonstration across the country, the process was ultimately halted as the Indonesian President Joko Widodo had asked Parliament to revise problematic clauses. The protest comes as the new criminal code introduced some controversial new laws, such as banning unmarried couple to cohabit; banning the defamation of the president, government ministers and agencies; banning of demonstration without notice; the witchcraft act (article 252); the privacy act (article 412), etc. Some human right experts has even called it: "a step backward in Indonesian democracy".

Yasonna Laoly, the Indonesian minister of law and human rights, receives the new criminal code report from Bambang Wuryanto, the head of the parliamentary commission overseeing the revision.

The new penal code contains 624 articles, which the government claimed it had spent the past years gathering feedback from stakeholders, experts and the public following a nationwide protest against the code in 2019. The new code, which applies to Indonesians and foreigners alike, will not take immediate effect, but instead, three years after the bill is enacted into law, in which opponents can file requests for judicial review of the code to the Constitutional Court.

== See also ==
- Indonesian criminal procedure
