= Indonesian State Gazette =

Journal of record of the Indonesian Government

Lembaran Negara Republik Indonesia
- Type: Government gazette
- Format: Broadsheet
- Founded: 1810 (as the Bataviasche Koloniale Courant)
- Language: Indonesian; Dutch (some documents only exist in Dutch)
- Website: www.beritanegara.co.id

The State Gazette of the Republic of Indonesia (Indonesian: Lembaran Negara Republik Indonesia, Dutch: Het Staatsblad van Indonesië) is the official government gazette of the Government of Indonesia. In issuing laws and regulations, the State Gazette acts as a reference for publication of all forms of announcements, orders, and regulations.

== History ==
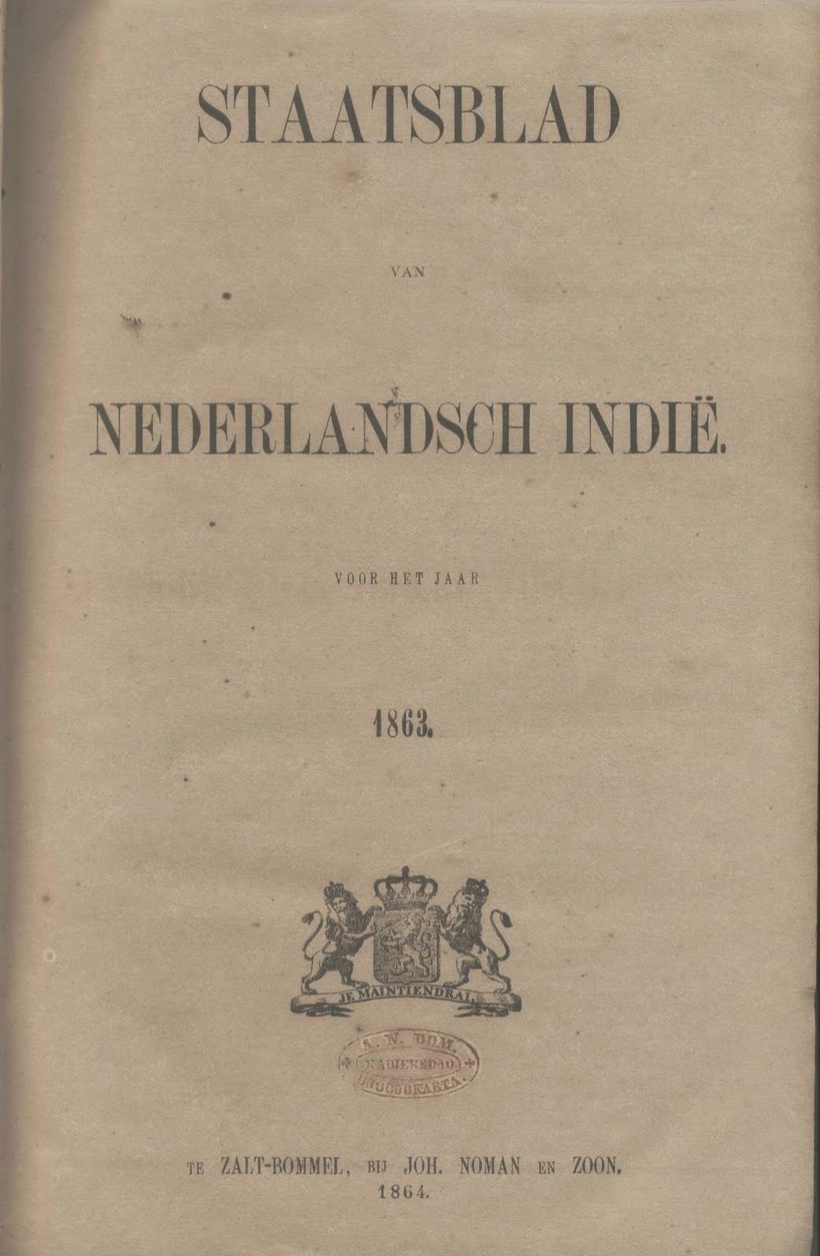
The Staatsblad van Nederlandsch-Indië, dated 1863

In Dutch, this publication is called staatsblad, more fully Het Staatsblad van Nederlandsch-Indië during the Dutch East Indies era and Het Staatsblad van Indonesië during the transitional period. During the era of liberal democracy, it was once known as the State Gazette of the United States of Indonesia, however, after the Presidential Decree of 5 July 1959, it was reverted to be called the State Gazette of the Republic of Indonesia.

During the Dutch colonial period, the Staatsblad became a reference for publication of all forms of Announcements, Ordonantie and Reglement. Every year, Staatsblad sheets are collected into a book bundle, and after Indonesia's independence, Staatsblad became known as the State Gazette of the Republic of Indonesia (LNRI), which is a periodical publication followed by numbering containing information relating to policies, announcements, and laws and regulations published and having the power of coercion over the entire territory of the Republic of Indonesia. Staatsblad and the LNRI are a very important historical documents in which various histories of regulations, policies and/or announcements that occurred during the Dutch colonial period are recorded.

== Current publication ==
Notices for the following, among others, are published:

- Enactment of bills of the Indonesian Parliament
- Enactment of government regulations and government regulations in lieu of law
- Ratification of agreements between the Republic of Indonesia and other countries or international bodies
- Declaration of a state of danger and a state of war

If these regulations have explanations, their promulgation is placed in the supplement to the State Gazette of the Republic of Indonesia.

== Archives ==
=== Dutch colonial laws & decrees ===
Period	Article	Archives
Dutch East Indies
1847	Staatsblad No. 23 about Wetboek van Koophandel voor Indonesië (WvK) (Code of Commercial Law)	
1847	Staatsblad No. 23 about Burgerlijk Wetboek voor Indonesië (BW) (Code of Civil Law)	
1847	Staatsblad No. 52 jo. Stb 1849-63 about Reglement op de Rechtsvordering (Civil Procedural Regulations)	
1849	Staatsblad No. 25 about Reglement op het Holden der Registers van den Burgerlijken Stand voor Europeanen (Civil Registry Regulation for European)	
1915	Staatsblad No. 732 about Wetboek van Strafrecht (WvS) (Criminal Code)	
1917	Staatsblad No. 130 about Rechtswezen Burgerlijke Stand Reglementen: Vreemde Oosterlingen (Civil Registry Regulation for Foreign Orientals)	
1920	Staatsblad No. 751 about Reglement op het Houden van de Registers van den Burgerlijken Stand voor Eenigle Groepen v.d. nit tot de Onderhoringer van een Zelfbestuur, behoorende Ind. Bevolking van Java en Madura (Civil Registry Regulation for Indigenous Pribumi)	
1933	Staatsblad No. 74 jo. Staatsblad 1936:607 about Huwelijksordonantie voor Christenen Indonesiers Java, Minahasa en Amboiena (Civil Registry Regulation for Indigenous Pribumi with Christian Faith)	

=== Post-independence ===
Period	Article	Archives
Indonesia
1974	LNRI No. 53, in addition to LNRI No. 3039 (Basic Provisions of Social Welfare)	
1981	LNRI No. 76, in addition to LNRI No. 3209 (Criminal Procedural Law)	
1983	LNRI No. 36 (Government Regulations regarding the implementation of the Criminal Procedural Law)	
