= Judiciary of Indonesia =

Judicial system in Indonesia

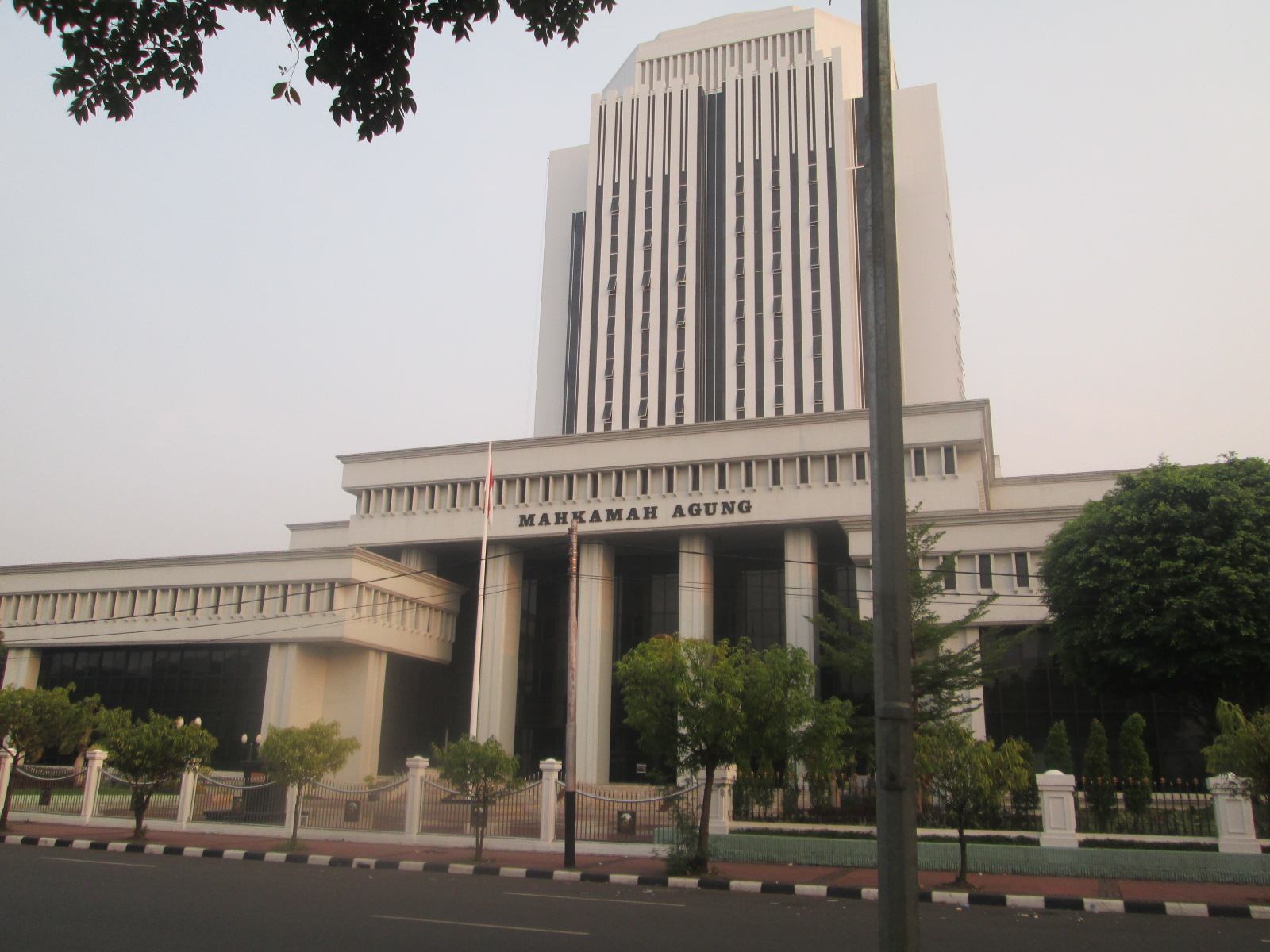
The Supreme Court building in Jakarta

The Judiciary of Indonesia, according to Chapter IX of the 1945 State Constitution of the Republic of Indonesia, consists of the Supreme Court of Indonesia (Mahkamah Agung Republik Indonesia, abbreviated MA), the Constitutional Court of Indonesia (Mahkamah Konstitusi Republik Indonesia, abbreviated MK), and the lesser court system under the Supreme Court. These lesser courts are categorically subdivided into the Public Courts (Peradilan Umum), the Religious Courts (Peradilan Agama), the State Administrative Courts (Peradilan Tata Usaha Negara), and the Military Courts (Peradilan Militer).

There's also the Judicial Commission of Indonesia (Komisi Yudisial Republik Indonesia) that monitor the performance of judges, advise the House of Representatives on judicial appointments and review community complaints about the behavior and fairness of presiding judges.

== Law ==
Indonesian law is based on Dutch colonial laws, Islamic family laws, and aspects of Adat laws (unwritten, traditional rules still observed in the Indonesian society). The highest law of the land is the 1945 Constitution, amended four times from 1999 to 2002 during the early Reformasi period. Under Article 7 of Law No. 12/2011, the type of laws enacted by the government are hierarchically structured as:

1. The 1945 Constitution (Undang-Undang Dasar Negara Republik Indonesia Tahun 1945)
2. Resolutions of the People's Consultative Assembly (Ketetapan Majelis Permusyawaratan Rakyat)
3. Acts (Undang-Undang) and Government Regulations in-lieu-of Acts (Peraturan Pemerintah Pengganti Undang-Undang)
4. Government Regulations (Peraturan Pemerintah)
5. Presidential Regulations (Peraturan Presiden)
6. Provincial Ordinances (Peraturan Daerah Provinsi)
7. City Ordinances (Peraturan Daerah Kota) or Regency Ordinances (Peraturan Daerah Kabupaten)

Indonesian law ascribed to civil law system, inherited from the Dutch implementation of the Roman legal system (Roman-Dutch law), as well as the Napoleonic Code. The judicial system is inquisitorial in nature, where the court of law actively pursue the facts of the case and dispute, working closely with other elements of the Indonesian law enforcement agencies. The judges reach a verdict after examining the evidences, and prefer applying statutory laws: Stare decisis is not widely used. Trials by jury system is not implemented.

Although Indonesia is a decentralized, unitary state, there is no separation between central and regional judiciary system; All judicial system is set on a hierarchical, but contiguous top-down chain of command.

== Courts system ==
=== Courts structure ===
The Indonesian court system is set on a three-level court hierarchy:

- First-level courts (Peradilan tingkat pertama) based in the municipalities (city or regency), where the courts in this level have original jurisdiction to hear cases, resolve disputes, and reach a verdict;
- Second-level courts (Peradilan tingkat banding) based in the provincial capital, where the courts in this level have appellate jurisdiction to hear appeals from the first-level courts; and
- Third-level courts (Peradilan tingkat kasasi) based in the national capital Jakarta, where the main court in this level, the Supreme Court, serve as the final court of appeals, although they also have original jurisdiction over certain matters. Meanwhile, the Constitutional Court also have original jurisdiction over certain matters separate from the Supreme Court, but have no appellate jurisdiction.

=== Supreme Court ===
The Supreme Court of the Republic of Indonesia (Mahkamah Agung Republik Indonesia) is the highest court of law. It is the final court of appeal for criminal and civil verdicts made in the lesser courts, thus they are able to overrule lesser courts' verdicts. It resolves dispute on the matter of judicial jurisdiction, and hears request to review previous Supreme Court verdicts due to newly discovered evidence or due to judicial error. The latter legal action is known as "Review of court decision" (Peninjauan Kembali, abbreviated into PK).

Aside from administration of justice, the Supreme Court are tasked to nominate three people to fill the position for the justices of the Constitutional Court, reviews laws and regulations lower than Acts jointly enacted by the DPR and the President (Judicial Review), and provide opinions as a constitutional requirement for the President before granting executive pardon and legal rehabilitation of convicts.

The Supreme Court is headed by the Chief Justice of the Supreme Court of Indonesia, currently by Sunarto.

=== Constitutional Court ===
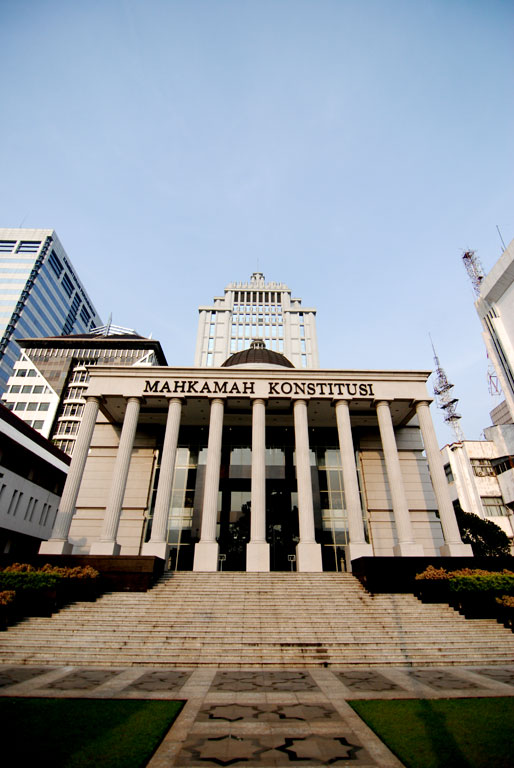
The Constitutional Court building in Jakarta

The Constitutional Court of the Republic of Indonesia (Mahkamah Konstitusi Republik Indonesia) rules over disputes specified in Article 24C of the 1945 Constitution, as well as other functions enshrined by Laws. It is formed in 2003 during the Reformasi period, as the result of the Third Amendment of the Constitution. The Constitutional Court have jurisdiction over cases concerning:

- Constitutional review of a Law;
- Disputes between state institutions regarding their constitutional competence and jurisdiction;
- Disputes arising from electoral results, both national, provincial, and municipal elections;
- Dissolution of political parties; and
- Impeachment process of the President and/or the Vice President, in which the Constitutional Court must rules whether the articles of impeachment submitted by the DPR to remove from office the President and/or the Vice President is proven or not proven, in order to proceed or not to proceed to the removal process.

The current Chief Justice of the Constitutional Court of Indonesia is Suhartoyo, who have headed the Constitutional Court since November 2023.

=== Lesser courts ===
There are four subdivisions of the lesser courts, consisting of the Public Courts, the Religious Courts, the State Administrative Courts, and the Military Courts.

==== Public Courts ====
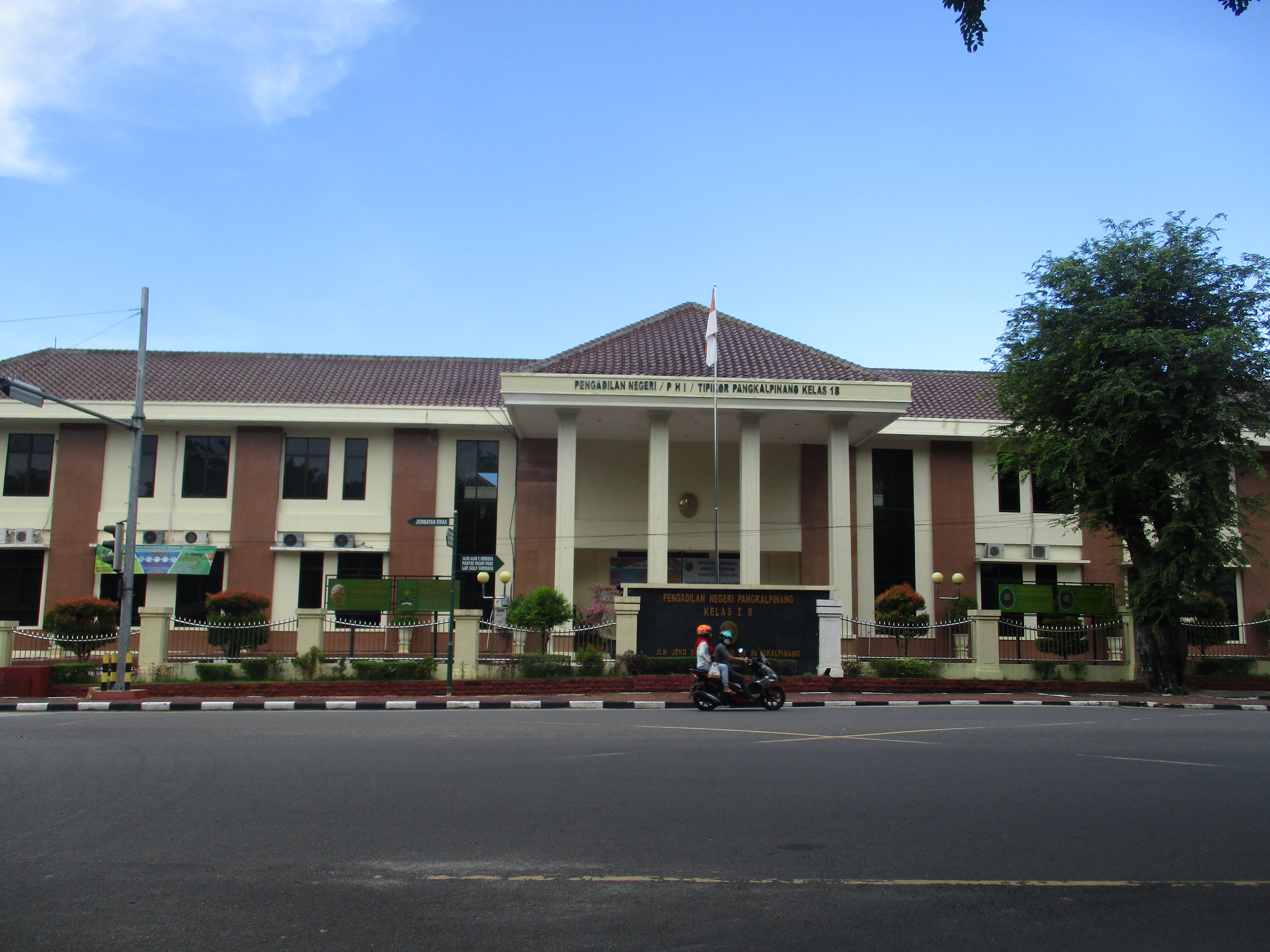
Pangkalpinang District Court building

The Public Courts (Peradilan Umum) consists of the first-level District Court (Pengadilan Negeri) and the second-level High Courts (Pengadilan Tinggi), after which further appeals go to the Supreme Court. They hear criminal and civil cases involving Indonesian citizens or foreign citizens in Indonesia, as well as Indonesian and foreign legal entities who are based in Indonesia or if they chose to have their case heard in Indonesian court.

District Courts have original jurisdiction to hear cases within the city and regency, while High Courts have appellate jurisdiction at the provincial level, based in the provincial capital.

There are specialized courts formed within the system of first-level public courts, such as:

- Juvenile courts (Pengadilan Anak), which function under special juvenile criminal procedural system;
- Human rights courts (Pengadilan Hak Asasi Manusia or Pengadilan HAM), which hear cases of human rights violation conducted by the government or government officials;
- Industrial relations courts (Pengadilan Hubungan Industrial), which hear cases of industrial relations dispute, industrial conflict of interests, prejudiced termination of employment, and resolving dispute between unions in the same workplace;
- Commercial courts (Pengadilan Niaga) which hear cases of corporate bankruptcy, debt suspension, intellectual property disputes, and bank liquidation;
- Fishery courts (Pengadilan Perikanan) which hear cases of fisheries crime – that is, illegal, unregulated, and unreported fishing; and
- Anti-corruption courts (Pengadilan Tindak Pidana Korupsi or Pengadilan Tipikor) which hear cases of corruption, graft, bribery, money laundering, and other acts considered to be corruption crime.

==== Religious Courts ====
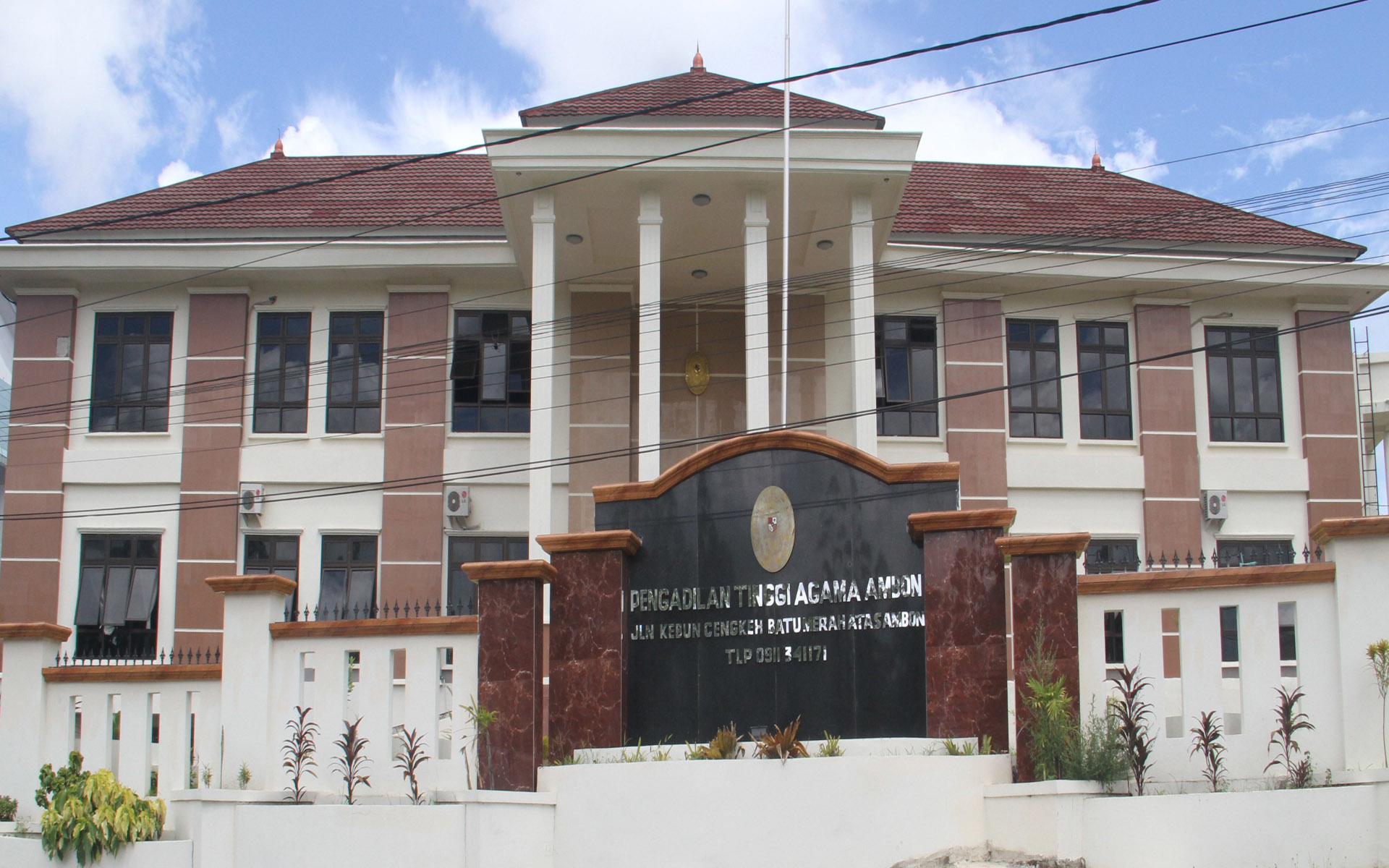
Ambon High Religious Court building

The Religious Courts (Peradilan Agama) are for Muslim citizens to resolve civil matters, such as marriage, inheritance, and property donated for religious purposes (waqf). They are the first-level Religious Court (Pengadilan Agama) and the second-level Religious High Court (Pengadilan Tinggi Agama). Despite the name, they do not hear cases concerning religions other that Islamic cases; Cases concerning civil cases of other religions are heard in the public courts.

In Aceh, special first-level Sharia Court (Mahkamah Syar'iyah) and second-level Provincial Sharia Court of Aceh (Mahkamah Syar'iyah Provinsi Aceh) are vested with special authority, owing to Aceh's special status within Indonesia. These special courts, in addition to basic religious courts' authority, have jurisdiction over Islamic morality criminal cases (Jinayat) regulated by local ordinances (Qanun), such as public drunkenness, sales of alcoholic beverages, gambling, and other moral crimes incompatible with Islamic values. Under this system, the courts are also empowered to deliver punishments not available under Indonesian laws, such as whipping.

==== State Administrative Courts ====
The State Administrative Courts (Peradilan Tata Usaha Negara) were established in 1986 intended to ensure that people would not be treated arbitrarily by government officials or institutions. Initially formed in 1981 as a specialized court under the public courts system, the State Administrative Courts were formalized under Law No. 5/1986 ('State Administrative Courts Act'). They rule in disputes involving the state officials or bodies, both within central and regional officials or institutions. The object of all state administrative proceedings are actions – proven with the issuance of a decision (Surat Keputusan or Beschikking) – or lack of actions by the government, considered harmful against the interest of the citizens. The courts also hear cases which include civil servants against their superiors of the internal bureaucracy of the government itself.

The state administrative courts are the first-level State Administrative Court (Pengadilan Tata Usaha Negara) with original jurisdiction to hear state administrative disputes, and the second-level State Administrative High Court (Pengadilan Tinggi Tata Usaha Negara) with appellate jurisdiction from cases heard in the first-level court. The Supreme Court serves as the final court of appeal.

There is one specialized court created within the system of the administrative courts – the Tax Court (Pengadilan Pajak).

==== Military Courts ====
Military Courts (Peradilan Militer) deal with criminal and military administrative cases involving members of the Indonesian National Armed Forces. They are the first-level Military Court (Pengadilan Militer, abbreviated into Dilmil) with original jurisdiction over cases regarding military personnel whose ranks are no higher than a captain, and the second-level High Military Court (Pengadilan Militer Tinggi, abbreviated into Dilmilti) hear appeals against decisions of the first-level courts, as well as having original jurisdiction over cases involving military personnel with ranks of a major and above.

Another second-level Primary Military Court (Pengadilan Militer Utama, abbreviated into Dilmiltama) hears appeals against decisions of the High Military Courts and also decides upon issues of jurisdiction of the various military courts.

During armed conflict, Battlefield Military Court (Pengadilan Militer Pertempuran, abbreviated into Dilmilpur) with wartime jurisdiction can be mobilized to hear criminal cases of military personnel and reach a verdict against said military personnel on the battlefield.

== Judicial Commission ==
Other than the Supreme Court and the Constitutional Court, the Judicial Commission of Indonesia (Komisi Yudisial Republik Indonesia) exercise judicial authority under Article 24B of the Constitution. Specifically, they exist to ensure the independence of the judges and the judicial system from unnecessary intervention and involvement. The laws tasked the Judicial Commission to:

1. Nominate candidates of judges (and ad hoc judges) of the Supreme Court to be approved by the DPR, by:
  1. receiving applications of the candidates;
  2. running an open selection process of the candidates;
  3. selecting qualified candidates to be nominated; and
  4. formally nominated the candidates to be approved by the DPR.
2. Maintain and enforce judges' code of conducts and code of ethics, by:
  1. oversee and observe judges' professional conducts;
  2. receive public reports regarding allegations of judges' violation of code of conducts and code of ethics;
  3. verify, clarify, and investigate the public reports and allegations of judges' violation of code of conducts and code of ethics;
  4. protect and maintain the judges' professionalism from unfounded allegations; and
  5. promoting the judges' professional capacity and welfare.

== Personnel ==
=== Judges ===
Judges (hakim) are state officials vested with judicial authority to hear cases, resolve disputes, and reach a verdict in civil and criminal cases. Within the Indonesian criminal procedural system, they are one of the most important subjects, aside from the law enforcement, the prosecutors, and the correctional facilities.

Aside from regular judges, there are ad hoc judges (hakim ad hoc), retired judges who have the judicial experience and skill to be appointed and assigned to hear cases in chambers for a certain period of times. They are integral to Indonesia's judicial system and deployed in specialized courts such as anti-corruption, commercial, and industrial relations courts, appointed from outside the career judiciary based on professional qualifications, integrity, and dedication to justice and human rights.

Judges decide cases based on statutory law. If there is no applicable statutes, judges must apply unwritten law and decide cases with wisdom and full responsibility to God.

=== Court staff ===
Court clerks (panitera) ran the judicial administrative aspect of the courts. They keep records of case proceedings, maintain records of cases of their assigned courts, release official copies of court documents, and execute civil case verdicts. Sometimes they are assigned to appear in court to help administer the oaths.

Bailiffs (juru sita) are the official executor of the court orders. They often hand-deliver court orders and summons, execute court seizures and safekeepings of properties and their attached documents, and communicate and cooperate with other agencies regarding their actions.

Secretaries (sekretaris) ran the non-judicial (general affairs) administrative aspect of the courts. They manage the court's assets and its procurement, oversee human resources, and ran the financial affairs of the court.
