= Adies Kadir =

Indonesian politician (born 1968)

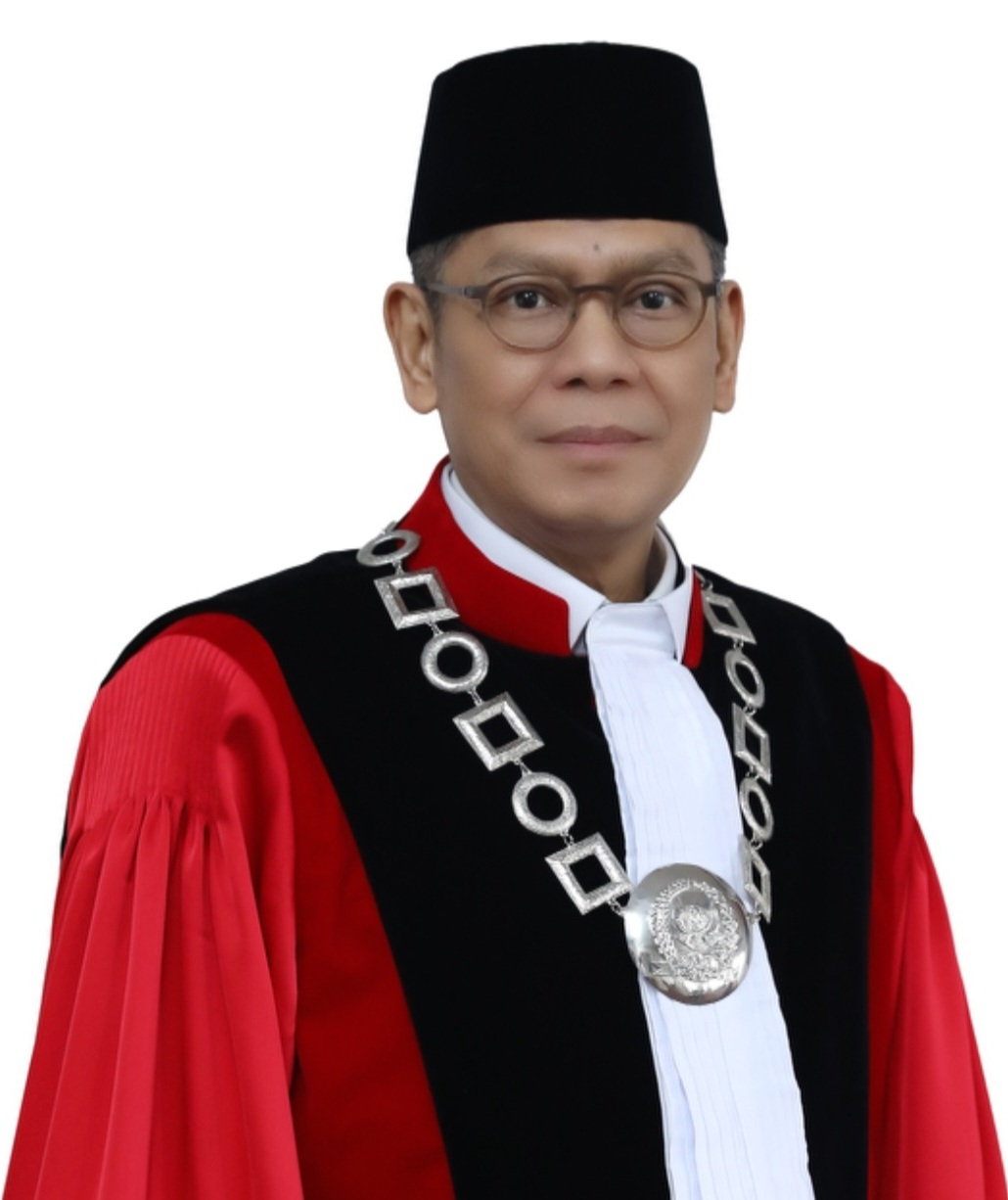
- Official portrait, 2026

Deputy Speaker of the House of Representatives
- In office 1 October 2024 – 27 January 2026 Serving with Cucun Ahmad Syamsurijal; Saan Mustopa; Sufmi Dasco Ahmad
- Speaker: Puan Maharani
- Preceded by: Arief Hidayat
- Succeeded by: Sari Yuliati

Member of the House of Representatives
- In office 1 October 2014 – 27 January 2026
- Constituency: East Java I

Personal details
- Born: 17 October 1968 (age 57) Balikpapan, East Kalimantan, Indonesia
- Party: Golkar (until 2026)
- Children: 2
- Parent: Abdul Kadir Mappong (father)

Adies Kadir (born 17 October 1968) is an Indonesian politician and judges. He was a member of the House of Representatives (DPR), serving from 2014, and its deputy speaker starting in 2024. He was also a member of the Surabaya city council from 2009 to 2014. He was suspended from his DPR membership on 1 September 2025 following his comments, which fueled tensions leading to widespread protests and rioting.

== Early life ==
Adies Kadir was born on 17 October 1968 in Balikpapan. His father Abdul Kadir Mappong was chief justice in Kapuas Regency, Central Kalimantan (later a Supreme Court justice), and Kadir is of Bugis descent. He moved frequently in his youth, completing elementary school in Kapuas, middle school in Samarinda, and high school in Kupang. He then studied engineering at Wijaya Kusuma University, Surabaya, graduating in 1993. He would later also study law, receiving a bachelor's degree in 2003, a master's in 2007, and a doctorate in 2017.

== Career ==
After graduating, he worked for a time as a site manager and later project manager at construction companies. In 1999, he became president director at an engineering company. In 2007, he joined a law office as a managing partner.

His political career began when he joined Golkar in Surabaya, becoming chairman of a district office and head of the party's youth wing in the city. In 2009, he was elected to Surabaya's Regional House of Representatives, and became chairman of Golkar's fraction there. He unsuccessfully ran in the 2010 Surabaya mayoral election as running mate of Arif Afandi, but the pair was defeated by Tri Rismaharini.

=== DPR member ===
In the 2014 Indonesian legislative election, he was elected for a seat in the national House of Representatives (DPR) from East Java's 1st district (Surabaya and Sidoarjo). He would be reelected from the same district in 2019 and 2024. Within DPR, he was in the Third Commission, covering law and human rights, between 2014 and 2024, with a brief stint in the 9th commission in 2015. During his time in the commission, he opposed the proposed criminalization of premarital sex, which had been suggested by several parties for a revision of the Indonesian Penal Code. He was also briefly on the body's ethics council during the case of DPR speaker Setya Novanto in 2017. On 1 October 2024, he was elected as a deputy speaker of DPR, with Puan Maharani as speaker.

On 22 August 2025, with an ongoing controversy over an increase in allowance payments for DPR members, Kadir spoke up in defense of the increases in a media interview and noted some increases in allowances for food, fuel, and housing. In particular, in his initial interview Kadir touched on a new Rp 50 million monthly housing allowance (provided in lieu of official housing), and cited that it was based on a daily housing allowance of Rp 3 million (US$200). He would retract his statement shortly after, claiming that the allowance would be Rp 3 million per month, multiplied by twelve months in a year. His statements (described by Jawa Pos as "nonsensical") went viral on social media.

Kadir's statement, along with others made by some DPR members, triggered public outcry, resulting in protests in late August which escalated into civil unrest and rioting across the country. On 31 August, the party announced that Kadir had been suspended from his membership in DPR, including his leadership position, effective on 1 September 2025.

== Family ==
He is married to Lita Anastasia, and the couple has a son and a daughter. His son Adiel Muhammad Kanantha was elected in 2024 to Sidoarjo's Regional House of Representatives.
