= Subekti =

Chief Justice of the Supreme Court of Indonesia

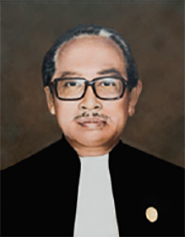

4th Chief Justice of the Supreme Court of Indonesia
- In office August 1968 – January 1974
- Nominated by: Suharto
- Preceded by: Suryadi
- Succeeded by: Umar Seno Aji

Personal details
- Born: 14 May 1914 Surakarta, Central Java, Dutch East Indies
- Died: 9 December 1992 (aged 78) Bandung, West Java, Indonesia
- Occupation: Judge

Subekti (1914–1992) was the fourth Chief Justice of the Supreme Court of Indonesia.

Although Subekti had initially been in consideration for the position of the country's third chief justice, then-President Sukarno chose Subekti's predecessor, Suryadi, against the recommendations of the Parliament of Indonesia. Among the reasons for Sukarno's rejection was the false accusation that Subekti played poker, viewed as an immoral act unbefitting a judge. Suryadi fell into conflict with the Indonesian Judges Association (of which he had been a founding member) as well as parliament; he resigned under President Suharto, after which parliament promptly appointed Subekti as chief justice.

== Works ==
- The law of contracts in Indonesia: remedies of breach. Kwitang: Gunung Agung (bookstore), 1989. ISBN 9789794121375

Legal offices
Preceded by Suryadi	Chief Justice of the Supreme Court of Indonesia; 1968–1974	Succeeded by Umar Seno Aji
