= Sarwata =

Indonesian judge (1935–2003)

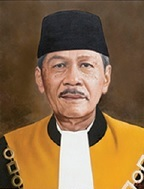

Chief Justice of the Supreme Court of Indonesia
- In office 1 November 1996 – 1 August 2000
- Nominated by: Suharto
- Preceded by: Suryono
- Succeeded by: Bagir Manan

Personal details
- Born: 2 July 1935 Tebing Tinggi, North Sumatra, Dutch East Indies
- Died: 3 August 2003 (aged 68) Jakarta, Indonesia
- Citizenship: Indonesian

Sarwata was the tenth Chief Justice of the Supreme Court of Indonesia. Sarwata led an investigation by the Supreme Court into allegations of its own wrongdoing in 1996, during which his panel found no evidence of such wrongdoing. His promotion as Chief Justice thereafter was seen as a victory for the Court's old elite. He was the first Chief Justice of Indonesia to be openly accused of corruption.

Sarwata has been described as the last bastion of military men in the Indonesian judiciary before the Post-Suharto era. He was disdainful of civilian institutions, rarely actually showed up for work at the Supreme Court, displayed little knowledge of legal issues and made a habit of dodging official visitors to his office.

Legal offices
Preceded by Suryono	Chief Justice of the Supreme Court of Indonesia; 1996–2000	Succeeded by Bagir Manan
