= Liliek Prisbawono Adi =

Indonesian judge (born 1966

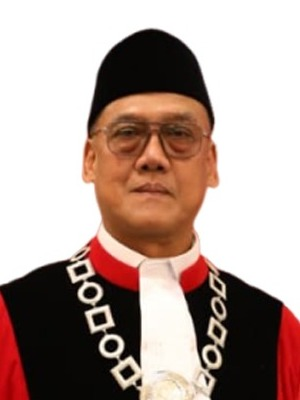
- Official portrait, 2026

Justice of the Constitutional Court of Indonesia
- Incumbent
- Assumed office 10 April 2026
- Nominated by: Supreme Court
- President: Prabowo Subianto
- Preceded by: Anwar Usman

Personal details
- Born: 27 October 1966 (age 59) Bojonegoro, East Java, Indonesia
- Education: University of Indonesia (S.H.); Padjadjaran University (M.H.); Airlangga University (Dr.)

Liliek Prisbawono Adi (born 27 October 1966) is an Indonesian judge who serves as a justice of the Constitutional Court of Indonesia since 2026. He was nominated by the Supreme Court to the position, succeeding former chief justice Anwar Usman.

== Early life ==
Liliek was born on 27 October 1966 in Bojonegoro, located in the province of East Java. He studied law at the University of Indonesia (UI), graduating in 1992. He would go on to pursue further studies at both Padjadjaran University and Airlangga University, graduating with a master's degree in 2013 and a doctoral degree in 2021 respectively.

== Career ==
Liliek later joined the civil service in 1994. Two years later, in 1996, he became a judge at the district court of Fakfak Regency, located in West Papua. He went on to serve in the district courts of Cibinong, Metro, and Bandung. He also served as chief justice in the district courts of Semarang Regency and Balikpapan. In 2022, Liliek was appointed chief justice of the district court of Central Jakarta. He was then appointed as a high court justice at the Medan High Court two years later, in 2024.

Following the retirement of Anwar Usman from the Constitutional Court, Liliek was appointed as his replacement. He took office on 10 April 2026.
