= Wirjono Prodjodikoro =

Chief Justice of the Indonesian Supreme Court

Professor Doctor Meester Wirjono Prodjodikoro
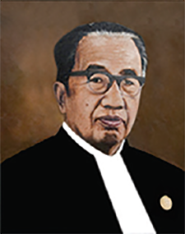

2nd Chief Justice of the Supreme Court of Indonesia
- In office 1952–1966
- Nominated by: Sukarno
- Preceded by: Kusumah Atmaja
- Succeeded by: Suryadi

13th Minister of Justice of Indonesia
- In office 28 March 1966 – 25 July 1966
- President: Sukarno
- Preceded by: Astrawinata
- Succeeded by: Umar Seno Aji

Personal details
- Born: 15 June 1903 Surakarta, Dutch East Indies
- Died: April 1985 (aged 82)
- Citizenship: Indonesian

Wirjono Prodjodikoro (15 June 1903 – April 1985) was the head justice of the Indonesian Supreme Court from 1952 to 1966.

== Biography ==
Wirjono was born in Surakarta, Dutch East Indies, on 15 June 1903. After completing his primary education, he attended the Rechtsschool in Batavia, graduating in 1922. He then became a judge, later taking time to study at Leiden University in Leiden, Netherlands.

Although Wirjono had already announced his candidacy for the People's Representative Council, in early 1952 he was selected as head justice of the Indonesian Supreme Court, replacing Kusumah Atmaja. During his time as head justice, the court was explicitly under the executive branch of the government. He was increasingly marginalized; for example, when he accompanied the Indonesian president to the United States in 1959, he sat with senators and congressmen, while his American counterpart, Earl Warren, was seated with Presidents Sukarno and Dwight D. Eisenhower. In another case, Sukarno invited Ruslan Abdulgani to breakfast when Abdulgani was supposed to be before the court as a slight to the court's powers.

In 1960, Wirjono was appointed to the cabinet. Initially stating that his appointment would not affect the separation of powers, when Sukarno did away with the legal concept Wirjono felt tricked and considered resigning. Towards the end of Sukarno's regime, Wirjono continued to garner greater power.

Together with Minister of Justice Sahardjo, Wirjono argued for greater protection of the freedoms of criminals and suspects; this eventually won general support, as the populace was displeased with the poor performance of Prosecutor General Goenawan. The two then moved to civil law reform; Wirjono strongly supported Sahardjo's suggestion to rescind the current civil and commercial codes. However, this was opposed by advocates and judges; the advocates and judges argued that said proposal would increase legal uncertainty, while Wirjono argued that little would change as much had already been replaced. Wirjono eventually propagated a circular on 5 September 1963 that declared seven articles that were to be considered invalid, involving gifts, rentals, and legitimation of children born out of wedlock.

Wirjono later replaced Astrawinata to become the Minister of Justice in the Second Revised Dwikora Cabinet, serving from 28 March to 25 July 1966. After Suharto took greater control of the government, Wirjono was replaced by Umar Seno Aji.

Wirjono died in April 1985.

== Legal acts ==
Wirjono was instrumental in drafting Emergency Law Number 1 of 1951, which established that there were three levels of court in Indonesia: public, appeals, and supreme. Later, when dealing with a Batak Karo adat (traditional law) inheritance case as Chief Justice of the Supreme Court, he and the court ruled that women had a right to an inheritance; this was against the Karo adat. However, his term as chief justice saw a greater increase in state intervention, with one of his 1964 instructions stating that the justices would have to work together with the prosecution to ensure that the verdict did not stray far from the indictment.

Legal offices
| Preceded by Kusumah Atmaja | Chief Justice of the Supreme Court of Indonesia; 1952-1966 | Succeeded by Suryadi |
