= Tarumanagara University =

University in Indonesia

- Universitas Tarumanagara
- Type: Private
- Established: 18 June 1959
- Founder: Kwee Hwat Djien
- Parent institution: Yayasan Tarumanagara
- Academic affiliations: Tarumanagara Institute; Tarumanagara Xinya College; Royal Taruma Hospital Jakarta
- Chairman: Ariawan Gunadi; Foundation Chairman
- Rector: Amad Sudiro, Rector; Sri Tiatri, Vice Rector
- Location: Campus I: Jl. Letjen S Parman No 1.; Campus II: Jl. Tanjung Duren Utara No 1.; Campus III: Jl. TB Simatupang, Jakarta, Indonesia
- Campus: 14,67 ha; Urban
- Colours: Maroon
- Nickname: Untar
- Website: untar.ac.id

Tarumanagara University (Indonesian: Universitas Tarumanagara, abbreviated as UNTAR) is a private university in Jakarta, Indonesia and one of the oldest private universities in the country. In 2017 UNTAR received an accreditation A (meaning Excellent) from the Government's National Accreditation Board (BAN-PT). It has 4 campuses, where Campus I (main campus) and Campus II are located in the metropolitan area of West Jakarta, and Campus III in South Jakarta. A future Campus IV of 130 hectares, currently under construction, is in Karawaci (a satellite town some 25 kilometers from West Jakarta), and will become an integrated campus called Tarumanagara City. Currently UNTAR is led by Rector Amad Sudiro and Vice-Rector Sri Tiatri.

== Faculties ==
Tarumanagara University Campus II building

There are eight faculties and a post-graduate program in the university as follows:

- Faculty of Economy and Business
- Faculty of Law
- Faculty of Engineering
- Faculty of Medicine
- Faculty of Psychology
- Faculty of Arts and Design
- Faculty of Information Technology
- Faculty of Communications Science
- Graduate Business School

The university offers Bachelor's and master's degree programs, as well as Doctoral degrees by research.

== History ==
Tarumanagara University (Untar) is one of the oldest private universities in Indonesia. Inspired by the Tarumanagara Kingdom, the idea to establish a university first emerged in 1957 by a group of sociologists within the Candra Naya Social Association, then known as Sin Ming Hui. On the initiative of Kwee Hwat Djien, they agreed to establish a foundation, the Tarumanagara Foundation, on June 18, 1959.

The Tarumanagara Foundation established its first university, the Tarumanagara College of Economics, Department of Corporate Economics, on October 15, 1959, located in the Candra Naya building at 188 Jalan Gajah Mada. The university was led by Kho Oen Bik as dean and Lo Kiem Tjing as vice dean.

The Vocational School of Architecture was established on October 1, 1962. This school later became the Faculty of Engineering, Department of Architecture. This faculty is one of the oldest private architectural engineering departments in Indonesia.

In line with the Tarumanagara Foundation's commitment to education and health, the Faculty of Medicine was established on October 1, 1965, with the Undergraduate Medical Education Program and the Professional Medical Education Program.

The political unrest surrounding the G30S/PKI in 1966 disrupted the smooth running of lectures. Consequently, modern language faculties, such as the English Department, were forced to close, and their students were transferred to the Faculty of Letters at the University of Indonesia.

1967 marked the beginning of UNTAR's revival. That year, the campus on Jalan S. Parman was officially opened with a ceremony quite lavish for the time. This inauguration marked the first time an activity at UNTAR was covered by TVRI and broadcast the following day. The inauguration was attended by Jakarta Governor Ali Sadikin and Jakarta Deputy Governor Dr. R. Soewondo, who later served as Chairman of the Tarumanagara Foundation in 1974. The Department of Corporate Economics changed its name to the Department of Management, offering a Bachelor's Degree in Management. In 1972, the faculty opened the Department of Accounting, offering a Bachelor's Degree in Accounting.

Continuing to expand, UNTAR also launched the Informatics Engineering Program in 1992 and officially launched its Master's Program on October 1, 1992. This was followed by the establishment of two new faculties: the Faculty of Psychology and the Faculty of Fine Arts and Design in 1994.

After 2000, UNTAR established two new faculties: the Faculty of Information Technology in 2002 and the Faculty of Communication Sciences in 2006. In 2007, UNTAR's Main Building, built on 31,632 square meters of land, was inaugurated. In 2009, the Executive Lounge and Tarumanagara Knowledge Center (TKC) officially opened.

== Faculties and study programs for undergraduate programs ==
=== Faculty of Economics and Business ===
- Business Management study program
- Business Accounting study program

=== Faculty of Law ===
- Law study program

=== Faculty of Engineering ===
- Architecture study program
- Civil Engineering study program
- Urban and Regional Planning - Real Estate study program
- Mechanical Engineering study program
- Electrical Engineering study program
- Industrial Engineering study program

=== Faculty of Medicine ===
- Medical study program

=== Faculty of Psychology ===
- Psychology study program

=== Faculty of Arts and Design ===
- Interior Design study program
- Visual Communication Design study program

=== Faculty of Information Technology ===
- Information Technology study program
- Information Systems study program

=== Faculty of Communications Science ===
- Communication Studies program

== Notable alumni ==
- Ary Chandra, basketball player
- Christian Widodo, Mayor of Kupang
- Daming Sunusi, lawyer
- Daniel Johan, politician
- Djan Faridz, politician
- Erzaldi Rosman Djohan, Governor of Bangka Belitung Islands
- Eve Antoinette Ichwan, singer, actress, former JKT48 fifth generation member
- Jessica Veranda, singer, actress, former JKT48 first generation member
- Mona Ratuliu, actress and presenter
- Shani Indira Natio, former JKT48 third generation member
- Taufik Hidayat, badminton player and politician
- Tina Toon, actress, singer and member of Jakarta Regional House of Representatives
