= Ridwan Mansyur =

Indonesian judge

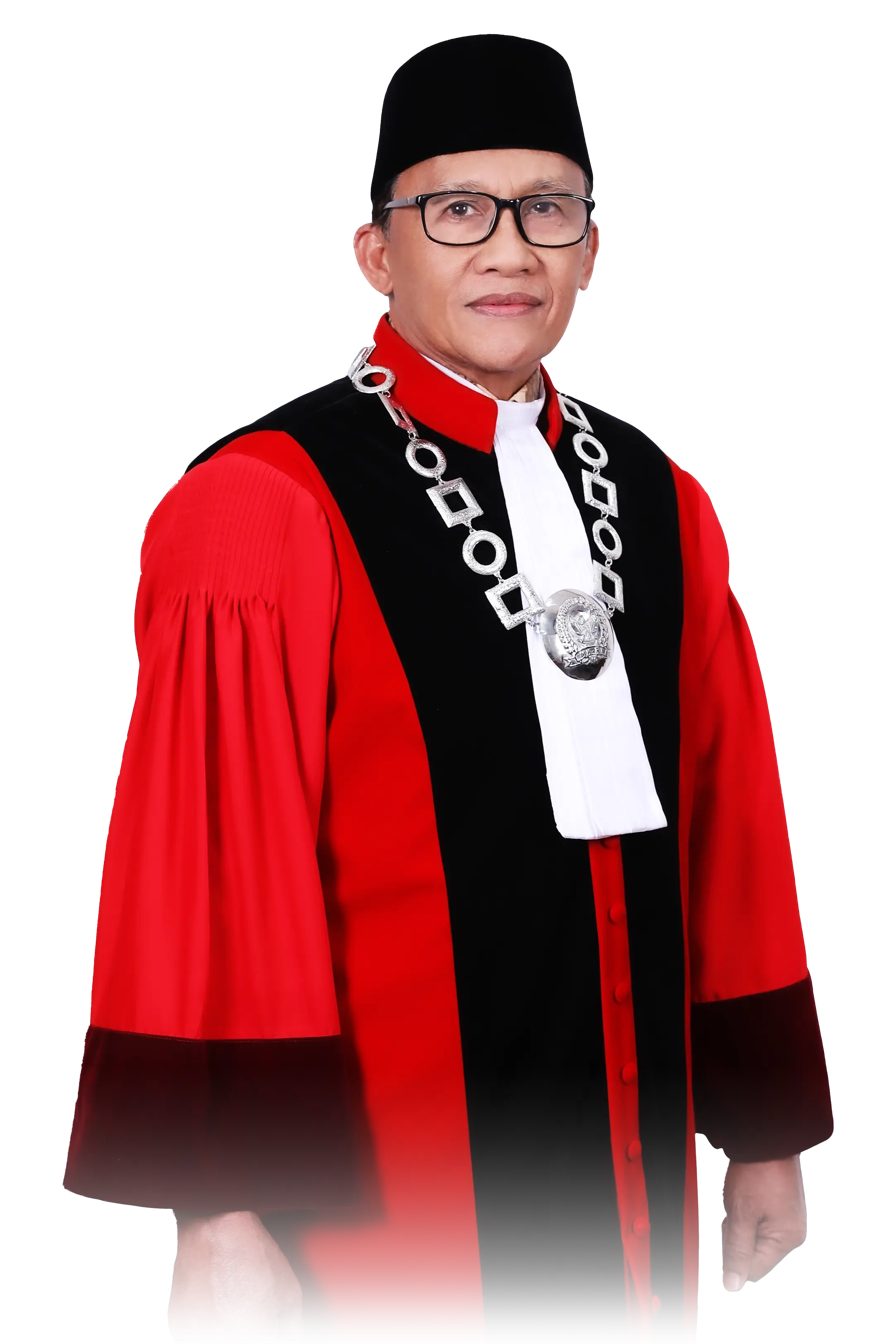

Justice of the Constitutional Court of Indonesia
- Incumbent
- Assumed office 8 December 2023
- President: Joko Widodo

Personal details
- Citizenship: Indonesian

Ridwan Mansyur (born 11 November 1959) is an Indonesian judge who presently serves as one of the justices of the Constitutional Court of Indonesia. Previously a secretary of the Supreme Court of Indonesia, he took his seat on the bench on the Constitutional Court on 8 December 2023, succeeding Manahan Sitompul.
