= Umar Seno Aji =

Indonesian politician

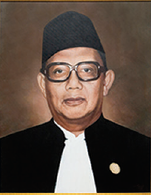

5th Chief Justice of the Supreme Court of Indonesia
- In office 1974–1981
- Nominated by: Suharto
- Preceded by: Subekti
- Succeeded by: Mujono

14th Minister of Law and Human Rights of Indonesia
- In office 25 July 1966 – 28 March 1973
- President: Suharto
- Preceded by: Wirjono Prodjodikoro
- Succeeded by: Mochtar Kusumaatmadja

Personal details
- Born: 5 December 1915 Surakarta, Central Java, Dutch East Indies
- Died: 9 November 1984 (aged 68) Jakarta, Indonesia
- Citizenship: Indonesian

Umar Seno Aji (5 December 1915 – 9 November 1984) was the fifth Chief Justice of the Supreme Court of Indonesia as well as the fourteenth Indonesian Minister of Law and Human Rights.

Aji's appointment as minister of law in 1966 was initially viewed as a victory by supporters of the rule of law; this later led to disappointment when, after his appointment, he became an opponent of judicial review. While his predecessor as chief justice Subekti had been a champion of judicial independence, Aji aided in the subordination of the supreme court to the executive branch and his successor as minister of law, Mochtar Kusumaatmadja. His exertion of pressure on courts to avoid giving citizens too many rights in tort cases were one factor that led to the establishment of formal administrative courts in the country, though his politics of patronage are still credited with whittling away the judiciary's independence by the 1970s.

In terms of jurisprudence, Aji often looked to the judiciaries of other nations for congruence with that of Indonesia. He asserted that the Proclamation of Indonesian Independence strongly resembled the United States Declaration of Independence, and that Indonesian courts enforce customary law in private disputes, a concept similar to that of common law and law of equity.

Legal offices
Preceded by Subekti	Chief Justice of the Supreme Court of Indonesia; 1974–1981	Succeeded by Mujono
