= Muhammad Syarifuddin =

Indonesian Supreme Court justice

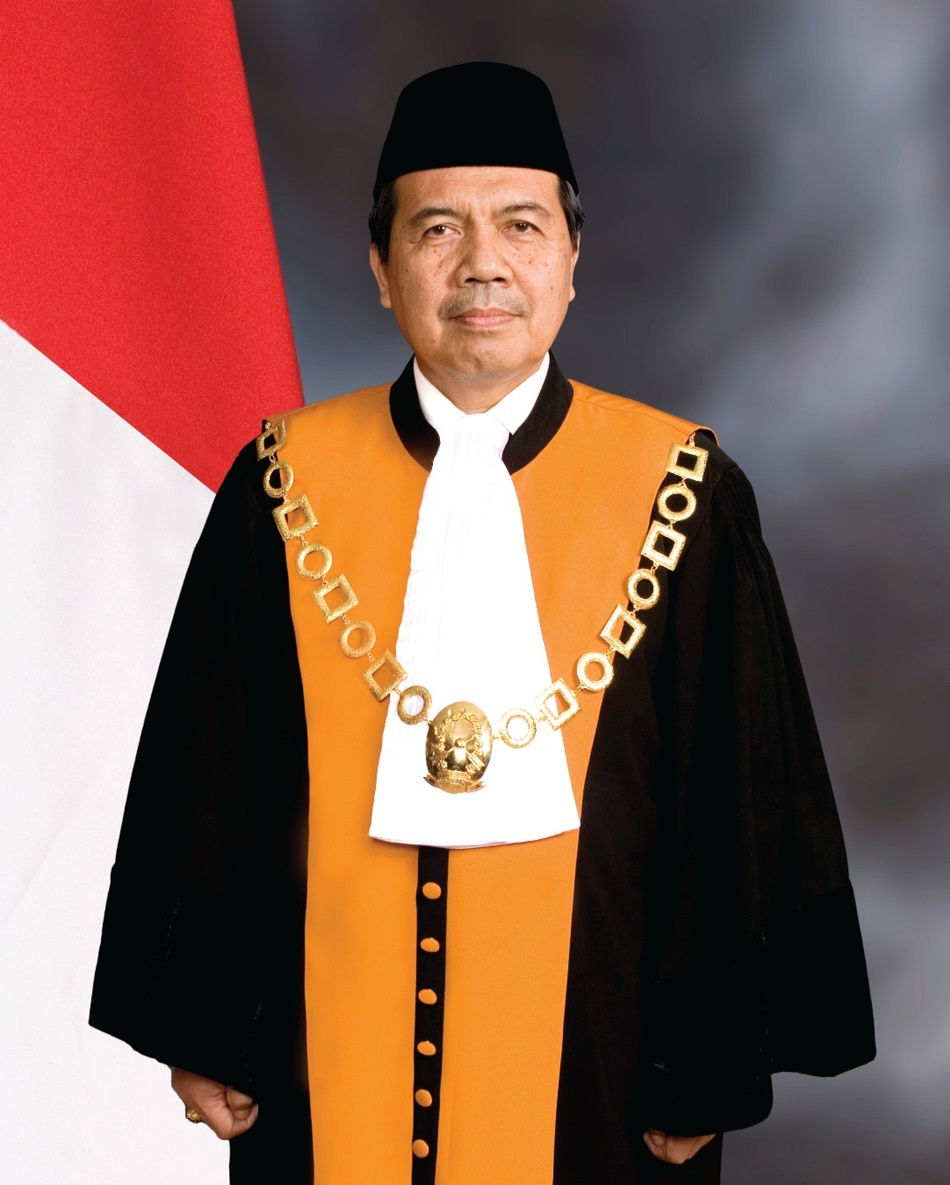
- Official portrait, 2020

14th Chief Justice of the Supreme Court of Indonesia
- In office 30 April 2020 – 16 October 2024
- Nominated by: Joko Widodo
- Preceded by: Muhammad Hatta Ali
- Succeeded by: Sunarto

Deputy Chief Justice of the Supreme Court of Indonesia, Judicial Affairs
- In office 3 May 2016 – 30 April 2020
- Preceded by: Mohammad Saleh
- Succeeded by: Andi Samsan Nganro

Personal details
- Born: 17 October 1954 (age 71) Baturaja, Ogan Komering Ulu, Indonesia
- Citizenship: Indonesian

Muhammad Syarifuddin (born 17 October 1954) is an Indonesian jurist who serves as the 14th Chief Justice of the Supreme Court of Indonesia from 30 April 2020 Until October 16, 2024. He also served as the Deputy Chief Justice of the Supreme Court Indonesia for judicial affairs, and previously served as the Supreme Court's head of supervision.

== Justice career ==
Syarifuddin started his career in the world of justice as a Civil Servant Candidate for Judge in 1981 after completing his Bachelor of Laws degree at the Indonesian Islamic University (UII). His career as a judge started at the Kutacane District Court in 1984. At the end of 1990, he moved his duties to the Lubuk Linggau District Court until 1995. After two years as a "Judge" at the Lubuk Linggau District Court, H.M. Syarifuddin was promoted to Deputy Chairperson of the Muara Bungo District Court, then earned a promotion as Chair of the Pariaman District Court. In 1999, he received a transfer decision as Chairman of the Baturaja District Court.

In 2003, the former head of the Supreme court of Indonesia Supervision Agency was promoted as a judge at the South Jakarta District Court. His two-year career in the National Capital led to the judge who was born Baturaja 17 October 1954 becoming head of the court again with a promotion as Deputy Chairperson of the Bandung District Court, a position entrusted to him in the 2005–2006 period. Furthermore, at the same court, H.M. Syarifudin, was entrusted as Chief Justice from 2006 to 2011.

In 2011, he was promoted as High Judge at the Palembang High Court. In the same year, the holder of a Doctor of Laws degree from Parahyangan Catholic University was entrusted with serving as Head of the Supervisory Board of the Supreme Court of Indonesia. He held this echelon I position until he was elected as a justice of the Supreme Court in 2013.

After 2 years serving as High Judge of Court District, Syarifudin was entrusted with carrying out the mandate as Chairman of the Monitoring Room. Less than one year serving as Chairman of the Oversight Chamber, Syarifudin was then democratically elected as Deputy Chief Justice of the Supreme Court of Indonesia for Judicial Affairs in the “Election” which was held on 14 April 2016. Syarifuddin will replace Mohammad Saleh who will retire starting 1 May 2016. The position of Deputy Chief Justice of the Supreme Court for Judicial Affairs will be held for the next five years (2021). Deputy Supreme Court (MA) for Judicial Affairs M Syarifuddin was elected as Chairman of the Supreme Court for the 2020–2025 period replacing Hatta Ali.

Legal offices
Preceded by Muhammad Hatta Ali	Chief Justice of the Supreme Court of Indonesia; 2020–2024	Succeeded by Sunarto
Preceded by Mohammad Saleh	Deputy Chief Justice of the Supreme Court of Indonesia; Judicial Affairs; 2016–2020	Succeeded by Andi Samsan Nganro
