= Suwardi (justice) =

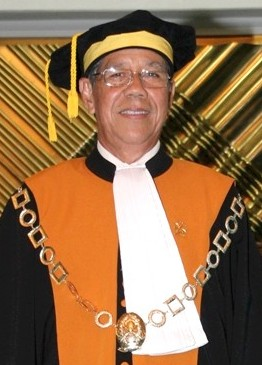

3rd Deputy Chief Justice of the Supreme Court of Indonesia, Non-Judicial Affairs
- In office 3 March 2014 – 1 June 2017
- Preceded by: Ahmad Kamil
- Succeeded by: Sunarto

Personal details
- Born: May 19, 1947 (age 78) Metro, Lampung, Indonesia
- Citizenship: Indonesian

Suwardi (born 19 May 1947) is an Indonesian justice who is the third Deputy Chief Justice of the Supreme Court of Indonesia for non-judicial affairs. He was elected to the position by a vote of his 47 peers on the court in 2013, earning 27 votes versus the 19 of his predecessor Ahmad Kamil.

Legal offices
Preceded by Ahmad Kamil	Deputy Chief Justice of the Supreme Court Indonesia; 2014–2017	Succeeded by Sunarto
