= Sukma Violetta =

Deputy chair of the Judicial Commission of Indonesia
- In office 2015–2020
- President: Joko Widodo
- Preceded by: Abbas Said

Personal details
- Born: 10 August 1964 (age 61) Jakarta, Indonesia
- Citizenship: Indonesian
- Spouse: Arsul Sani

Sukma Violetta is a legal reform expert and the current deputy chairwoman of the Judicial Commission of Indonesia. She was one of the first five of President Joko Widodo's nominations to the Commission to be approved by the House of Representatives on 8 September 2015. Violetta earned her bachelor of law degree from the University of Indonesia in 1990 and her master of law degree from the University of Nottingham in 1997. Prior to her position on the Commission, she served as an expert adviser on the legal reform team of the Attorney General of Indonesia.

Violetta opposed Indonesia's participation in the Doha Development Round of the World Trade Organization, pointing out that the results of the Uruguay Round in the Third World consist of increased poverty and environmental damage. She has described corruption, such as the repeated instances of graft at the Supreme Court, as "power minus accountability."
