= Indonesian Judges Association =

The Indonesian Judges Association, known locally as Ikatan Hakim Indonesia or IKAHI is an association of judicial officials in Indonesia. IKAHI's members include first-level trial judges and senior justices, as opposed to the Indonesian Judges' Forum (FDHI) which includes appeals court judges. IKAHI executive Suhadi has described the association's focus as protection of judges from threats and harassment, though judicial transparency activists have disputed this.

== History ==
IKAHI was established in 1953 in order to defend the interests of Indonesian judges on topics such as salary and judicial independence from the executive branch. The association's founding is credited to Suryadi, the third Chief Justice of the Supreme Court of Indonesia, as he was the first person to begin organizing district judges in 1952. Suryadi was also the first chairman of IKAHI, though he eventually resigned as Chief Justice due to intense conflict between himself and the association itself.

== Positions ==
IKAHI has been, at times, in opposition to both the Government of Indonesia as well as activists pushing for greater judicial oversight. Although the group has frequently pushed for increases in judges' salaries, it also threatened punitive action against judges who resorted to going on strike in order to achieve that goal in 2012. IKAHI was also instrumental in a 2015 Constitutional Court ruling that stripped the Judicial Commission of its role in selection of judges for administrative, district and religious courts, handing that power back to the Supreme Court.
