= Harifin Tumpa =

Justice of the Supreme Court of Indonesia

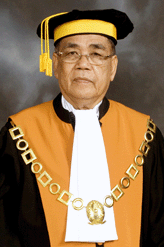

12th Chief Justice of the Supreme Court of Indonesia
- In office 1 November 2008 – 1 March 2012
- Nominated by: Susilo Bambang Yudhoyono
- Preceded by: Bagir Manan
- Succeeded by: Muhammad Hatta Ali

Personal details
- Born: 23 February 1942 (age 84) Soppeng, Celebes
- Citizenship: Indonesian
- Education: Hasanuddin University

Harifin Tumpa was the twelfth Chief Justice of the Supreme Court of Indonesia as well as the first Deputy Chief Justice of the Supreme Court Indonesia for non-judicial affairs.

Tumpa's retirement led to a measure of controversy surrounding the Supreme Court of Indonesia, as rumors of vote buying by his more junior colleagues abounded before he'd even officially retired.

Legal offices
Preceded by Bagir Manan	Chief Justice of the Supreme Court of Indonesia; 2008–2012	Succeeded by Muhammad Hatta Ali
Preceded by Established	Deputy Chief Justice of the Supreme Court Indonesia; 2008–2009	Succeeded by Ahmad Kamil
