= Bagir Manan =

Chief Justice of the Supreme Court of Indonesia

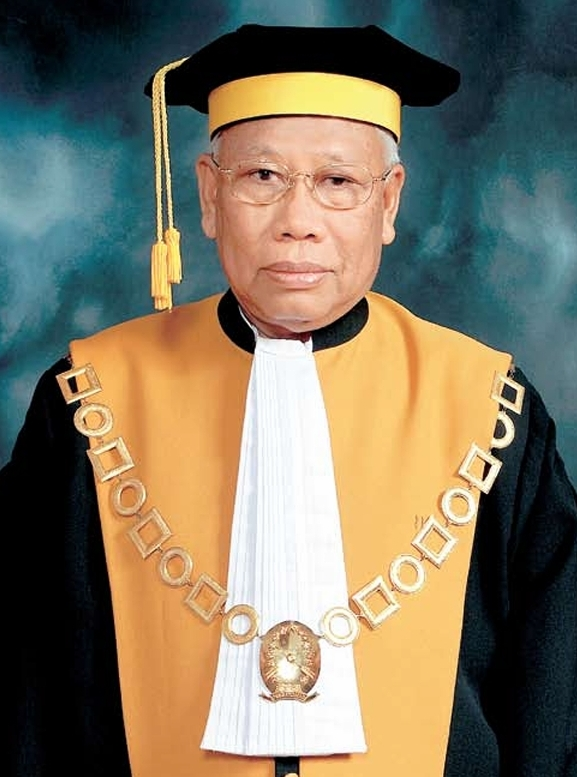

Chief Justice of the Supreme Court of Indonesia
- In office 18 May 2001 – 31 October 2008
- Nominated by: Abdurrahman Wahid
- Preceded by: Sarwata bin Kertotenoyo
- Succeeded by: Harifin Tumpa

Personal details
- Born: 6 October 1941 (age 84) Kalibalangan, South Abung, Lampung Residency, Dutch East Indies

Bagir Manan (born 6 October 1941) is an Indonesian jurist who served as Chief Justice of the Supreme Court of Indonesia from 2001 to 2008. and chairman of the Press Council between 2010 and 2016. He is a professor of constitutional law at Padjadjaran University.

Legal offices
Preceded by Sarwata bin Kertotenoyo	Chief Justice of the Supreme Court of Indonesia; 2001–2008	Succeeded by Harifin Tumpa
