= Mohammad Saleh =

Indonesian judge (born 1946)

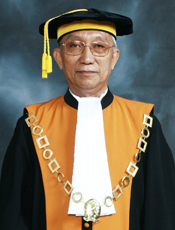

2nd Deputy Chief Justice of the Supreme Court Indonesia, Judicial Affairs
- In office 21 March 2013 – 1 May 2016
- President: Susilo Bambang Yudhoyono
- Preceded by: Abdul Kadir Mappong
- Succeeded by: Muhammad Syarifuddin

Personal details
- Born: April 24, 1946 (age 79) Pamekasan Regency, East Java
- Citizenship: Indonesian

Mohammad Saleh is the former second Deputy Chief Justice of the Supreme Court Indonesia for judicial affairs.

Legal offices
Preceded by Abdul Kadir Mappong	Deputy Chief Justice of the Supreme Court Indonesia; 2013-2016	Succeeded by Muhammad Syarifuddin
