= Harjono =

Judge of the Constitutional Court of Indonesia

Justice on the Constitutional Court of Indonesia
- In office 16 August 2003 – 5 June 2008
- President: Susilo Bambang Yudhoyono

Personal details
- Citizenship: Indonesian

Harjono is a former judge of the Constitutional Court of Indonesia. He has remained vocal on judicial affairs in Indonesia even after his retirement, expressing support for public humiliation as a punishment for people convicted of graft. In 2016, he also appeared before the Constitutional Court again to testify in favor Jakarta Governor Basuki Tjahaja Purnama's case for the right of incumbent politicians to not take leaves of absence during campaign seasons.
