= Patimah Moerwani =

Indonesian chemist and academic administrator

Dean of the Faculty of Exact Sciences and Natural Sciences of the University of Indonesia
- In office 1974–1978
- Preceded by: Suwardi
- Succeeded by: Soekarja Somadikarta

Personal details
- Born: December 30, 1927 Sukabumi, West Java, Dutch East Indies
- Died: July 22, 2021 (aged 93) Jakarta, Indonesia
- Education: University of Indonesia/Bandung Institute of Technology (Dra.); University of Kentucky (M.Sc.); University of Salford (M.Sc.)

Patimah Moerwani (30 December 1927 – 22 July 2021) was an Indonesian chemist and academic administrator from the University of Indonesia who became the dean of the university's faculty of exact sciences and natural sciences from 1974 to 1978 and dean of the faculty of math and natural sciences of the Indonesia Open University.

== Life and career ==
Born on 30 December 1927 in Sukabumi, Patimah graduated high school in Bandung in 1949. He began studied chemistry at the University of Indonesia in Bandung. In the midst of her studies, the university's engineering faculty and the exact sciences and natural sciences faculty were separated to form the Bandung Institute of Technology. She graduated from the Bandung Institute of Technology in 1961. She received her master's degree from the University of Kentucky in 1966 and the University of Salford in 1973.

Patimah began teaching chemistry at the University of Indonesia in 1969. She specialized in environmental chemistry and wrote the standard Indonesian chemistry dictionary, which was produced under the auspices of Majlis Bahasa Brunei-Indonesia-Malaysia, the language organization in standardizing and harmonizing spelling and terminology among Brunei Darussalam, Indonesia, and Malaysia. She attended the 24th and the 25th session of the organization.

From 1974 until 1978, Patimah served as the Dean of the Faculty of Exact Sciences and Natural Sciences of the University of Indonesia, replacing Soewardi. She was succeeded by Soekarja Somadikarta, his first deputy. She joined the Indonesia Open University upon its establishment in 1984, where she became the first deputy dean of the math and natural sciences of the university under Soewardi. After Soewardi's departure from the university, Patimah succeeded him as the Indonesia Open University's dean of the math and natural sciences faculty. Patimah continued Soewardi's policies in the university but admitted that she had troubles managing student affairs in the university.

Patimah died on the midnight of 22 July 2021.
