= Deputy Chief Justice of the Supreme Court of Indonesia =

Deputy Chief Justice of Indonesia
- Wakil Ketua Mahkamah Agung
- Supreme Court of Indonesia
- Seat: Jakarta
- Appointer: Supreme Court justices

The Deputy Chief Justice of the Supreme Court of Indonesia (Indonesian: Wakil Ketua Mahkamah Agung) refers to two separate positions on the Supreme Court of Indonesia. Both are elected from the existing members of the court as is the case with the higher ranking Chief Justice of the Supreme Court of Indonesia.

== List of Deputy Chief Justices ==
=== Deputy of Judicial Affairs ===
Number	Name	Period of office		Length of term (days)
1	Abdul Kadir Mappong	19 February 2009	31 January 2013	1,442
2	Mohammad Saleh	21 March 2013	1 May 2016	1,137
3	Muhammad Syarifuddin	3 May 2016	30 April 2020	1,458
4	Andi Samsan Nganro	15 February 2021	1 February 2023	716
5	Sunarto	3 April 2023	16 October 2024	562
6	Suharto	25 August 2025	Incumbent	378

=== Deputy of non-Judicial Affairs ===
Number	Name	Period of office		Length of term (days)
1	Harifin Tumpa	13 February 2008	19 February 2009	372
2	Ahmad Kamil	19 February 2009	18 February 2014	1,825
3	Suwardi	3 March 2014	1 June 2017	1,186
4	Sunarto	23 May 2018	3 April 2023	1,776
5	Suharto	15 May 2024	25 August 2025	845
6	Dwiarso Budi Santiarto	10 November 2025	Incumbent	301

== See also ==
- Deputy Chief Justice of the Constitutional Court of Indonesia
