= Abdul Kadir Mappong =

Indonesian court deputy

1st Deputy Chief Justice of the Supreme Court Indonesia, Judicial Affairs
- In office 19 February 2009 – 31 January 2013
- President: Susilo Bambang Yudhoyono
- Succeeded by: Mohammad Saleh

Personal details
- Citizenship: Indonesian

Abdul Kadir Mappong was the first Deputy Chief Justice of the Supreme Court Indonesia for judicial affairs. Mappong had initially been appointed as a member of the Supreme Court of Indonesia in the year 2000 before his eventual retirement from the judiciary in the year 2013.

Legal offices
| Preceded by Established | Deputy Chief Justice of the Supreme Court Indonesia; 2009-2013 | Succeeded by Mohammad Saleh |
