= Soekarja Somadikarta =

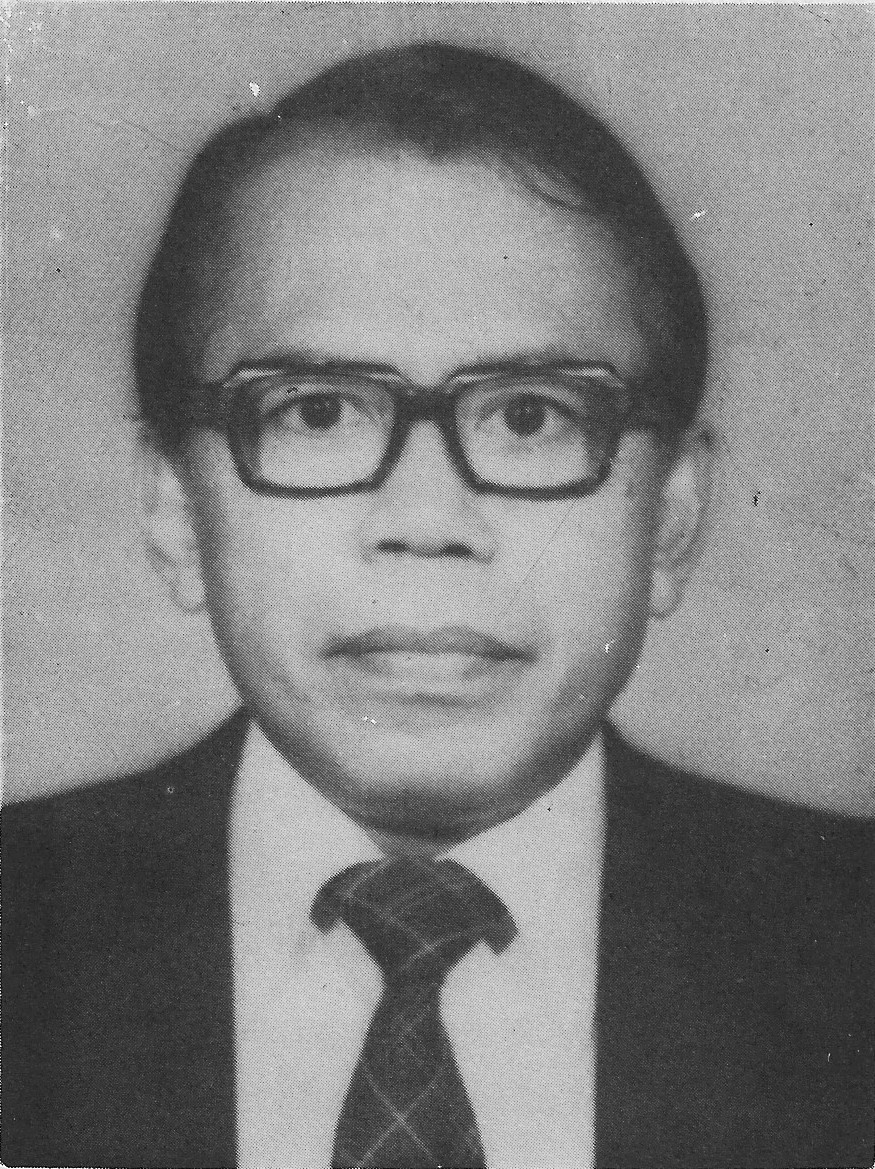

Dean of the Faculty of Math and Natural Sciences of the University of Indonesia
- In office 1978 – 19 November 1984
- Preceded by: Patimah Moerwani
- Succeeded by: Sahati Suharto

Personal details
- Born: April 21, 1930 (age 96) Bandung, West Java, Dutch East Indies
- Spouse: Lily Somadikarta
- Children: 2
- Education: National University (Drs.); Free University of Berlin (Dr.); University of Indonesia (Prof.)

Soekarja Somadikarta (born 21 April 1930) is an Indonesian ornithologist and a professor emeritus at the University of Indonesia. He has been described as "the father of Indonesian Ornithology who also pioneered the forerunner of systematic bird observation research in Indonesia."

The Togian white-eye (Zosterops somadikartai), a bird found in the Togian islands of Indonesia, was named in honor of Soekarja Somadikarta.

He won the 2011 Habibie Award.

== Articles ==
- Somadikarta, Soekarja (1967). "A Recharacterization of Collocalia papuensis Rand, the Three-toed Swiftlet" (PDF). Proceedings of the United States National Museum. 124 (3629). Washington, D.C.: 1–8. doi:10.5479/si.00963801.124-3629.1 – via Smithsonian Institution.
- Somadikarta, Soekarja (1968). "The Giant Swiftlet, Collocalia gigas Hartert and Butler". The Auk. 85 (4): 549–559. doi:10.2307/4083365. JSTOR 4083365.
