= Sunarto (judge) =

Indonesian Supreme Court justice

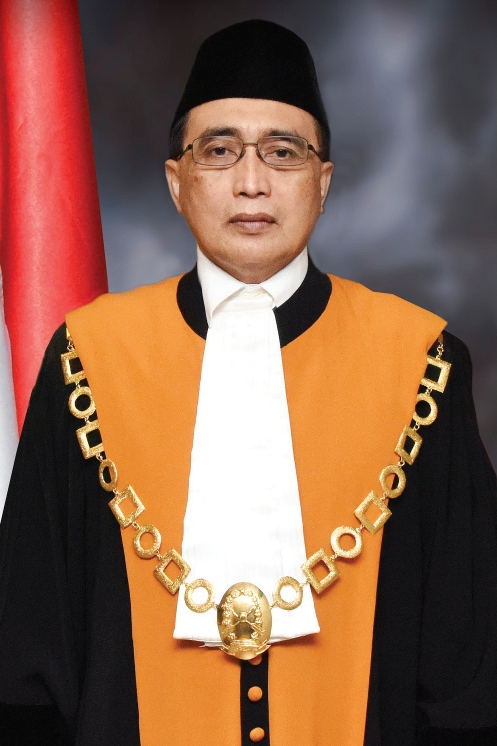
- Official portrait, 2018

15th Chief Justice of the Supreme Court of Indonesia
- Incumbent
- Assumed office 16 October 2018
- Nominated by: Joko Widodo
- Preceded by: Muhammad Syarifuddin

Deputy Chief Justice of the Supreme Court of Indonesia, Judicial Affairs
- In office 3 April 2023 – 16 October 2018
- Preceded by: Andi Samsan Nganro
- Succeeded by: Vacant

Deputy Chief Justice of the Supreme Court of Indonesia, non-Judicial Affairs
- In office 23 May 2018 – 3 April 2023
- Preceded by: Suwardi
- Succeeded by: Suharto (judge)

Personal details
- Born: April 11, 1959 (age 67) Sumenep, Indonesia
- Education: Airlangga University (S.H.); Indonesian Islamic University (M.H.); Airlangga University (Dr.)

Sunarto (born 11 April 1959) is an Indonesian jurist who serves as the 15th and current Chief Justice of the Supreme Court of Indonesia since 16 October 2024.

== Justice career ==
On 30 September 2013, Sunarto was inaugurated by Chief Justice Muhammad Hatta Ali to be the person most responsible for supervising the behavior of judges (head of the supervisory body). Sunarto was also rejected twice as a candidate for Supreme Court justice by the DPR in 2013–2014. In 2015, he succeeded in becoming a Supreme Court Justice. In 2017, Sunarto was inaugurated as chairman of the Supervisory Chamber. In a special plenary session of the Supreme Court held on 16 October 2024, Sunarto was elected as chief justice through a voting process by the Supreme Court justices. Sunarto is also the chairman of the board of trustees (MWA) of Airlangga University, replacing Prof. Dr. M. Hatta Ali, SH, MH.

On 10 June 2024, Sunarto received an honorary professorship or honoris causa from Airlangga University (HCUA) for his dedication, services, and contributions to legal science in Indonesia. In his inauguration as an honorary professor, Sunarto delivered a scientific oration entitled "Makna Penegakan Hukum dan Keadilan dalam Perkara Perdata".
