= Ahmad Kamil =

Indonesian Supreme Court justice

2nd Deputy Chief Justice of the Supreme Court Indonesia, Non-Judicial Affairs
- In office 19 February 2009 – 18 February 2014
- President: Susilo Bambang Yudhoyono
- Preceded by: Harifin Tumpa
- Succeeded by: Suwardi

Personal details
- Citizenship: Indonesian

Ahmad Kamil is an Indonesian justice who is the second Deputy Chief Justice of the Supreme Court of Indonesia for non-judicial affairs.

Kamil's term as Deputy Chief Justice lasted from 2009 to 2014. He ran for judicial election for a second term in the position, but lost to his successor Suwardi, receiving only 19 versus Suwardi's 28 out of the votes from their 47 peers on the court.

Legal offices
Preceded by Harifin Tumpa	Deputy Chief Justice of the Supreme Court Indonesia; 2009–2014	Succeeded by Suwardi
