= Sahati Suharto =

Indonesian chemist and academic administrator

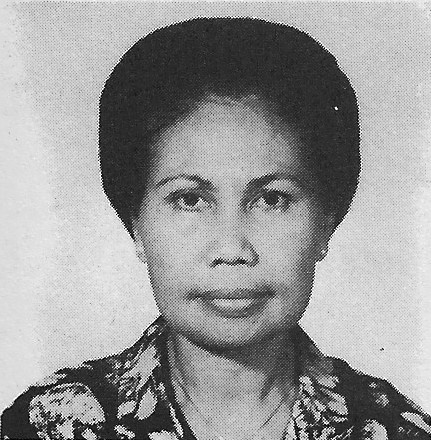

Dean of the Faculty of Math and Natural Sciences of the University of Indonesia
- In office 19 November 1984 – 1 March 1988
- Preceded by: Soekarja Somadikarta
- Succeeded by: Parangtopo Sutokusumo

Personal details
- Born: 10 March 1932 Batavia, Dutch East Indies
- Died: 14 April 2020 (aged 88) Bandung, West Java
- Education: University of Indonesia/Bandung Institute of Technology (Dra.)

Sahati Suharto (10 March 1932 – 14 April 2020) was an Indonesian chemist and academic administrator from the University of Indonesia who became the dean of the university's Faculty of Math and Natural Sciences from 1984 to 1988.

== Career ==
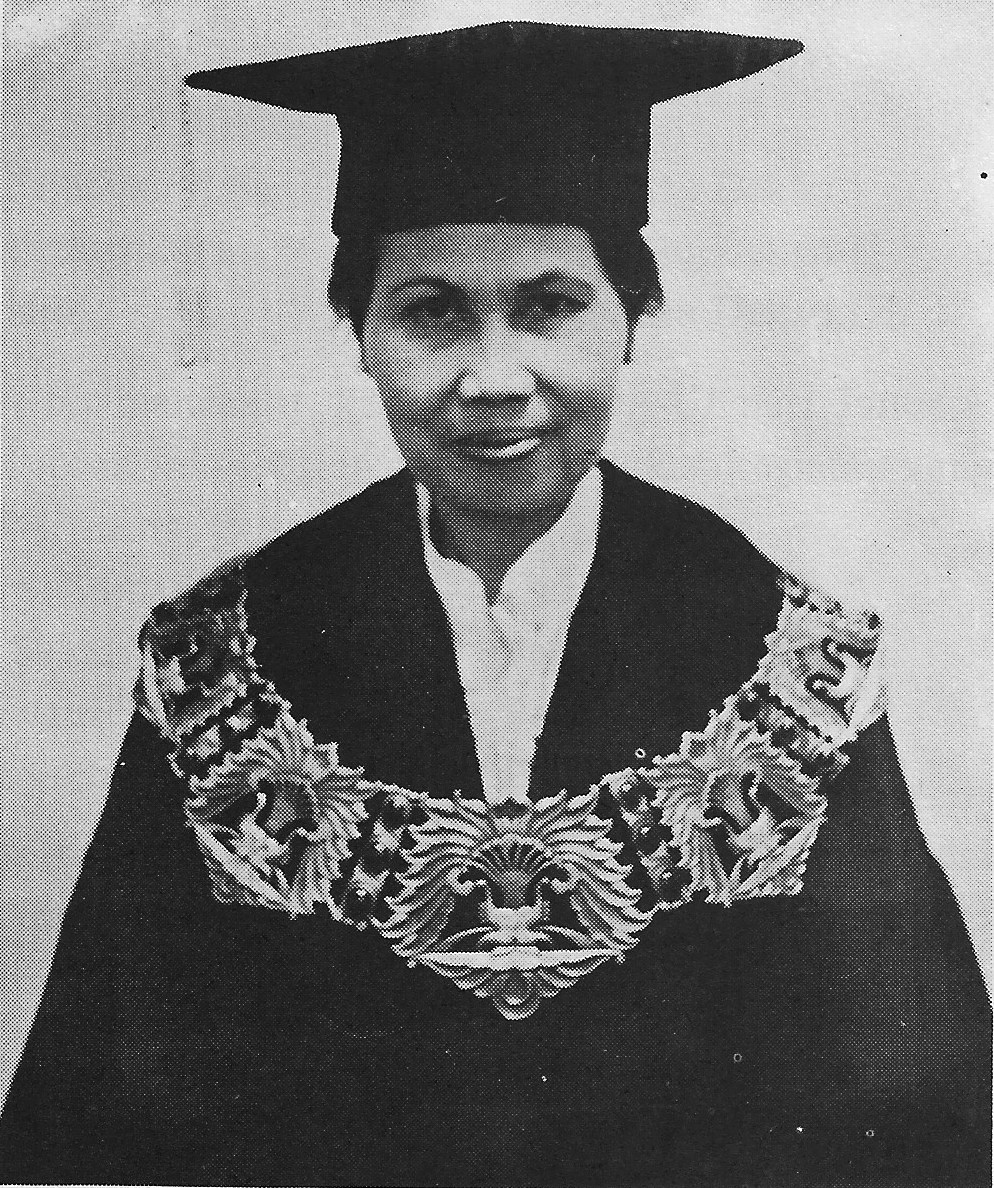
Sahati in her academic robe.

Born on 10 March 1932 in Jakarta, Sahati received her bachelor's degree in chemistry from the Bandung Institute of Technology in 1963. Sahati taught inorganic chemistry at the university and translated several textbooks on the subject. She was appointed as the chair of the chemistry department from 1975 until 1976. Around November 1976, Sahati conducted a two-week trip to Japan, where she visited universities and chemical facilities. Two years later, she was appointed by dean of the Faculty of Exact Sciences and Natural Sciences Soekarja Somadikarta to serve as his deputy for academic, research, and community service. She served in this position until 19 November 1984.

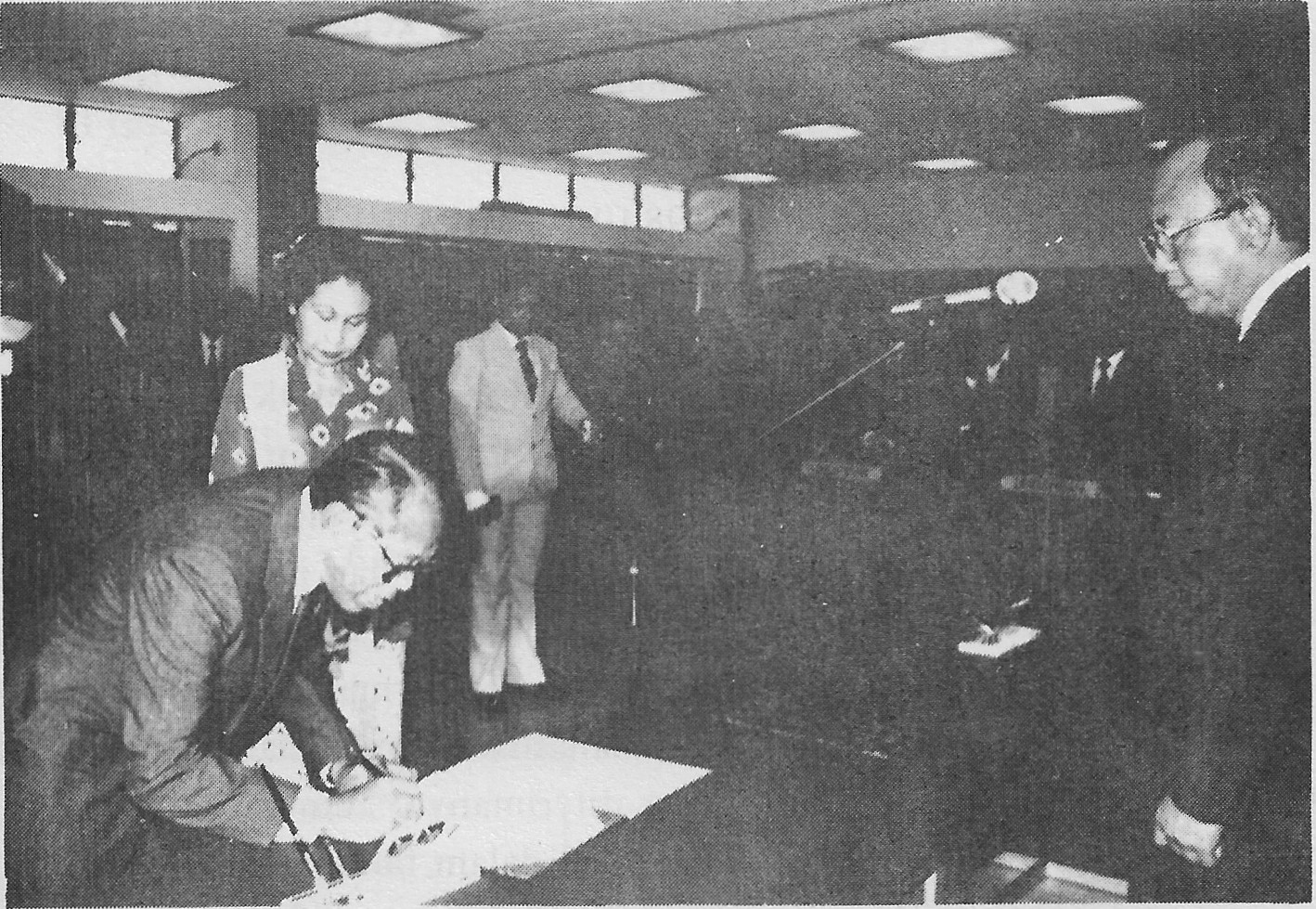
Sahati's inauguration as dean of the faculty of math and natural sciences.

On 19 November 1984, Sahati became the dean of University of Indonesia's Faculty of Math and Natural Science. She was the second woman to hold this position. During her tenure, she was sued by one of her students, whom she expelled due to bad grades. Sahati had previously offered him a chance to re-apply but was refused. She served in the position until she was replaced by Parangtopo Sutokusumo on 1 March 1988. Sahati continued teaching chemistry at the university until her retirement and supported efforts to introduce chemistry to high school students, urging students not to fear chemistry.

Sahati died on 14 April 2020 at her residence in Bandung, West Java.
