= Third Commission of the House of Representatives of Indonesia =

Third Commission of the House of Representatives
- Komisi III Dewan Perwakilan Rakyat Republik Indonesia
- Coat of arms of the People's Representative Council
- Chairperson: Herman Hery
- Vice Chairperson: Adies Kadir; Habiburokhman; Ahmad Sahroni; Khairul Saleh
- Parent organization: People's Representative Council

Third Commission of the House of Representatives, more commonly known as Third Commission, is one of eleven commissions for the 2019-2024 period, within the People's Representative Council of Indonesia. The commission has the scope of tasks in the fields of law, human rights, and security.

== Scope and duties ==
Like other commissions, the First Commission has duties in the fields of:

1. Law.
2. Human rights.
3. Security.

== Membership ==
=== Composition ===
==== Leadership ====
Chairman	Vice Chairman	Vice Chairman	Vice Chairman	Vice Chairman
Bambang Wuryanto PDI-P	Adies Kadir Golkar	Habiburokhman Gerindra	Ahmad Sahroni Nasdem	Khairul Saleh PAN
