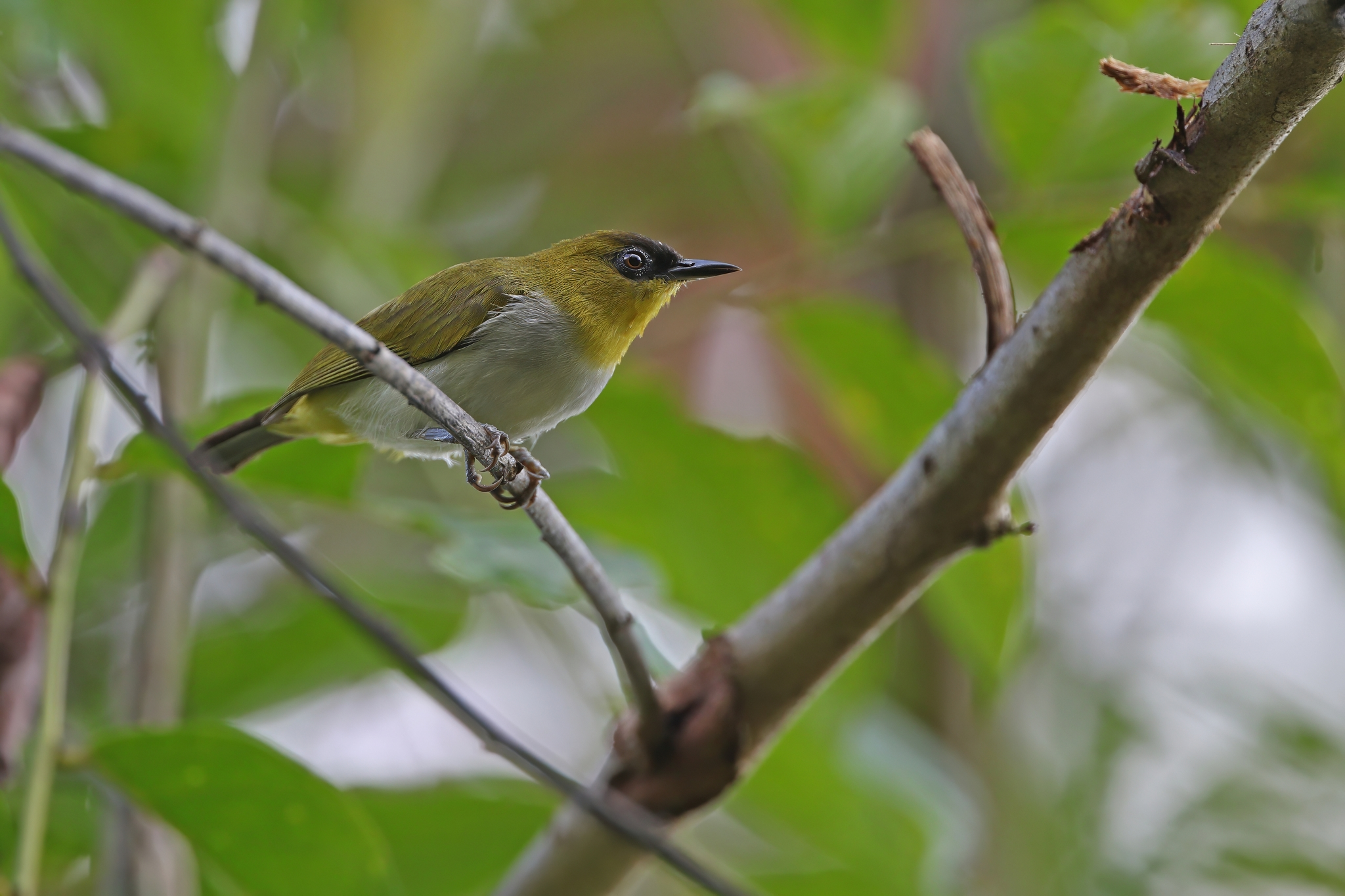

Conservation status
- Near Threatened (IUCN 3.1)

Scientific classification
- Kingdom: Animalia
- Phylum: Chordata
- Class: Aves
- Order: Passeriformes
- Family: Zosteropidae
- Genus: Zosterops
- Species: Z. somadikartai

Binomial name
- Zosterops somadikartai Indrawan, Rasmussen & Sunarto, 2008
- Location of the Togian Islands with islands where the species has been found marked in red

= Togian white-eye =

Species of bird

The Togian white-eye (Zosterops somadikartai) is a species of bird in the family Zosteropidae.

It is found in the Togian Islands of Indonesia, where it is endemic. The species was first spotted by University of Indonesia researcher Mochamad Indrawan and his colleague Sunarto in 1997, and formally described in 2008. The species is named after Soekarja Somadikarta, a prominent Indonesian ornithologist. Unlike most species in the genus it lacks a white-ring around the eye.

The species is believed to be endangered, although it has not yet been assessed by the IUCN.

== Description ==
The Sulawesi region is believed to have at least 9-10 species that are found in isolated islands. This isolation has led to speciation with differences in morphology and vocalizations. This new species is most similar to the black-crowned white-eye (Zosterops atrifrons) but lacks the white eye ring which is narrow but conspicuous even in juvenile black-crowned white-eyes. The Togian white-eye has a less extensive black cap, clearer yellow throat, distinct pale base to the bill and reddish (brown in the black-crowned) iris. The species is separated from Zosterops surdus of the west-central Sulawesi by the paler and brighter olive above and clearer yellow on the throat. It differs from Zosterops subatrifrons of Peleng and Banggai Islands by the lack of the white eye ring, greyer breast and less extensive black crown. Zosterops anomalus of southern Sulawesi also lacks a white eye ring but it has tiny white specks around the orbital skin. Differences in the pitch and modulation of the song of Z. somadikartai are noted in comparisons with other Zosterops species known from the region.

== Distribution and status ==
The holotype was collected from Pulau Malenge close at an elevation of about 50 m above sea level. It has also been observed on Malenge, Binuang, Talatakoh Island and two sites at Batudaka Island all at locations near the coast. The habitats included mangrove to secondary vegetation and gardens consisting of coconut, clove, cacao and durian. The birds were found to be gregarious, moving in flocks of twos and threes.

The birds were not detected on the Togian and the Walea Islands. Surveys suggested that the entire population was found in an area of less than 5000 km^{2} and therefore fulfilling the IUCN criteria for "Endangered" status (EN, B, 1, a, b, iii).
