= Muhammad Hatta Ali =

Indonesian judge

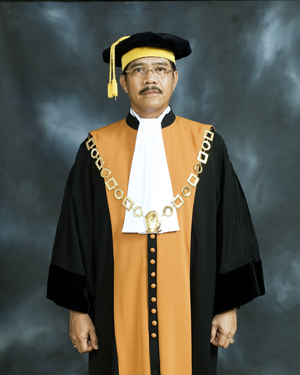
- Official portrait, 2012

13th Chief Justice of the Supreme Court of Indonesia
- In office 1 March 2012 – 30 April 2020
- Nominated by: Susilo Bambang Yudhoyono
- Preceded by: Harifin Tumpa
- Succeeded by: Muhammad Syarifuddin

Personal details
- Born: 7 April 1950 (age 75) (Indonesia) Parepare, South Sulawesi
- Citizenship: Indonesian

Muhammad Hatta Ali is the thirteenth Chief Justice of the Supreme Court of Indonesia.

In the election held on 8 February 2012, M. Hatta Ali comfortably won the position of chief justice ahead of four other candidates. He was sworn in as chief justice by President Susilo Bambang Yudhoyono on 1 March 2012. Hatta first became a judge in 1982 when he took up a position on the North Jakarta District Court. He was appointed to the High Court in 2003 and then to the Supreme Court in 2007. He was replaced by Muhammad Syarifuddin on 30 April 2020.

Legal offices
Preceded by Harifin Tumpa	Chief Justice of the Supreme Court of Indonesia; 2012–2020	Succeeded by Muhammad Syarifuddin
