= Daming Sunusi =

Indonesian judge

- Born: Muhammad Daming Sunusi; June 1, 1952 (age 73); Indonesia Bulukumba, South Sulawesi, Indonesia
- Occupation: Judge
- Known for: Words controversial about rape victims during the election of Supreme Court Justice

Muhammad Daming Sunusi (born in Bulukumba, South Sulawesi, Indonesia, June 1, 1952) is a judge from Indonesia who became famous for his words "rape victims and perpetrators alike enjoy" in the House of Representatives of Indonesia at the fit and proper test as a potential justice of the Supreme Court of Indonesia.
