= Judicial Commission of Indonesia =

Judicial Commission of the Republic of Indonesia
- Komisi Yudisial Republik Indonesia
- Insignia of the Judicial Commission
- Established: 2 August 2005
- Location: Jakarta, Indonesia
- Composition method: Consist of former judges, legal academics and practitioners, as well as members of the public, approved by the President.
- Authorised by: Constitution of Indonesia
- Number of positions: 7
- Website: komisiyudisial.go.id

Chief of the Judicial Commission of Indonesia
- Currently: Amzulian Rifai
- Since: July 2023

The Judicial Commission of Indonesia (Indonesian: Komisi Yudisial) was established as a consequence of the third amendment to the Constitution of Indonesia ratified by the Indonesian People's Consultative Assembly on 9 November 2001. The Commission's duty is to monitor the performance of judges, advise the House of Representatives on judicial appointments and review community complaints about the behavior and fairness of presiding judges.

== History ==
The idea of a body to consider and give a final ruling on the appointment, promotion, transfer or dismissal of judges first arose in 1968 but failed to make the statute books. Pressure for the establishment of a body to bring about an honest, clean, transparent and professional legal system resurfaced in 1998 after president Soeharto resigned from office. On 9 November 2001, during its annual session, the People's Consultative Assembly passed the third amendment to the Constitution of Indonesia, mandating the establishment of a Judicial Commission. The proposal to establish the Judicial Commission was added into the amendment at the last minute and, in the view of some observers, the Commission was established in a hasty way. On 13 August 2004, Law No. 22 on the Judicial Commission was promulgated and on 2 July 2005, the president officially appointed the seven members of the Commission. The members were sworn in by the president on 2 August 2005.

Since its inception in 2005, most of the Commission's recommendations have been ignored by the Supreme Court. This has led the English-language publication the Jakarta Post to describe the Supreme Court as resistant to reform.

== Powers ==
The commission works to "maintain the honor, dignity and behavior of judges" and formerly held the power to propose candidates for the Supreme Court. Members are appointed by the president with the agreement of the House of Representatives. The precise authority of the Judicial Commission, however, was not agreed upon by the different branches of the legal system in Indonesia. It was reported in mid-2011, for example, that since its establishment in 2005 the Judicial Commission had summoned nine justices to be investigated for alleged ethics violations but that none had answered the summonses. Members of other branches of the legal system, such as Supreme Court judges, were reported to have taken the view that the Judicial Commission was exceeding its powers in attempting to summon judges in certain cases.

The Commission suffered a major blow to its authority when the Constitutional Court in August 2006 granted a request filed by 31 judges of the Supreme Court to drop activities that gave the Commission the power to investigate alleged violations by Supreme Court and Constitutional Court justices. Following that decision of the Constitutional Court, it was agreed that the powers of the Judicial Commission needed to be clarified. Most recently, during 2011, the Indonesian House of Representatives had under consideration a revision to the 2004 Judicial Commission Law which would strengthen the powers of the Judicial Commission to directly punish high court and district court judges. Under the proposed changes to the law, however, the authority to punish Supreme Court justices would remain with the Supreme Court.

In 2015, the Commission suffered a major blow to its powers when the Constitutional Court ruled in favor of a judicial review filed by the Indonesian Judges Association. The review alleged that selection of candidates for the bench was out of the Commission's purview, which only includes monitoring the performance of already serving judges.

== Members ==
The Judicial Commission consists of seven members drawn from former judges, legal practitioners, legal academics and community members.

The current members for the Commission's 2020–2025 session are:

- Amzulian Rifai (Chief)
- Siti Nurdjanah (Deputy Chief)
- M. Taufiq HZ
- Binziad Kadafi
- Sukma Violetta
- Joko Sasmito
- Mukti Fajar Nur Dewata
