= Suwardi (physicist) =

Indonesian physicist

Secretary of the National Atomic Energy Agency
- In office 1974–1977
- Preceded by: A.J. Surjadi
- Succeeded by: Soekotjo Joedoatmodjo

Dean of the Faculty of Exact Sciences and Natural Sciences of the University of Indonesia
- In office 1968–1974
- Preceded by: Soemantri Brodjonegoro
- Succeeded by: Patimah Moerwani

Personal details
- Born: February 4, 1925 Blitar, East Java, Dutch East Indies
- Died: July 22, 1998 (aged 73) Jakarta, Indonesia
- Spouse: Wien Suwardi
- Children: 2
- Education: Delft Institute of Technology (Ir.); University of California, Berkeley; University of Indonesia (Prof.)

Suwardi (4 February 1925 – 22 July 1998) was an Indonesian physicist and professor of physics at the University of Indonesia. He had served as the Secretary of the National Atomic Energy Agency and was dean at several universities in Indonesia.

== Early life and education ==
Suwardi was born on 4 February 1925 in Blitar. He studied physics at the University of Indonesia in Bandung before moving to study at the Delft Institute of Technology, where he received his degree in 1956. Upon receiving his degree, he underwent further studies at the University of California, Berkeley. He returned to Indonesia and began to teach at the engineering faculty of the University of Indonesia in Bandung for a year. He then moved to the Gadjah Mada University and taught until 1964 at the university's faculty of exact sciences and natural sciences.

== Career ==
On the same year after his departure from the Gadjah Mada University, Suwardi began working at the National Atomic Energy Agency. In the next year, he began teaching physics at the University of Indonesia in Jakarta. At the time of his entry, he, along with Parangtopo Sutokusumo, were the only permanent lecturers in the department. He was appointed as the dean of University of Indonesia's faculty of exact sciences and natural sciences from 1968 to 1974. He was appointed as a full professor in physics at the University of Indonesia in August 1973.

After serving as dean, Suwardi was appointed as the secretary of the National Atomic Energy Agency under director-general Achmad Baiquni from 1974 to 1977. During his tenure, Suwardi oversaw efforts to socialize atomic energy to the general public by introducing it to science teachers. He also warned the public to be careful on the use of radioactive materials.

Suwardi continued to taught at the University of Indonesia after the end of his tenure at the National Atomic Energy Agency. In 1984, the Indonesia Open University was officially opened, and the university's rector, Setijadi, invited Suwardi to join the university's faculty. He became the inaugural dean of the university's faculty of math and natural sciences. At the time of its establishment, the faculty had two majors, math and applied statistics. Suwardi was responsible for formulating the module for each majors. Due to the lack of technology that were available at that time, the academic staff had to use dry transfer lettering for mathematical and statistical symbols.

Suwardi also contributed to the administrative development of the university. He visited Canada for a comparative study with the Open Learning Institute of British Columbia. Suwardi also contributed to the university's learning evaluation system by developing a question bank and introducing a multiple-choice system for exams. Suwardi served as dean until 1990, when he was replaced by Patimah Moerwani. Previously, Patimah had succeeded him as dean at the University of Indonesia.

From the Indonesian Open University, Suwardi joined the Pancasila University and became the dean of the university's engineering faculty from 1991 until 1997. He then became the university's first deputy rector from 1997 until his death in 1998.

== Personal life ==
Suwardi was married to Wien Suwardi. The couple had two children, Mimmim Arumi Wardiati and Ririn Arminish Wulandari, who were both professors at the University of Indonesia.

Suwardi died on 27 July 1998 in Jakarta.
