= Suwardi =

Suwardi is an Indonesian name. Notable people with the name include:

- Suwardi (born 1947), Indonesian justice
- Suwardi (1925–1998), Indonesian physicist
- Suwardi Arland (died 2005), Indonesian football manager
- Monieaga Suwardi (born 1990), Indonesian footballer
- Ricky Karanda Suwardi (born 1992), Indonesian badminton player
