= Review of court decision in Indonesia =

Review of court decision or PK (Indonesian: Peninjauan Kembali) is a legal action that can be taken by a defendant to appeal a court ruling under the Indonesian judicial system. The ruling is legally enforceable if neither the District Court, the High Court nor the Supreme Court have filed an appeal. Court decisions that have permanent legal force cannot be reviewed - for example, if the verdict states that the defendant is free from all charges.
