= Chief Justice of the Supreme Court of Indonesia =

Chief Justice Officer of Indonesia

- Ketua Mahkamah Agung Republik Indonesia
- Seal of the Supreme Court

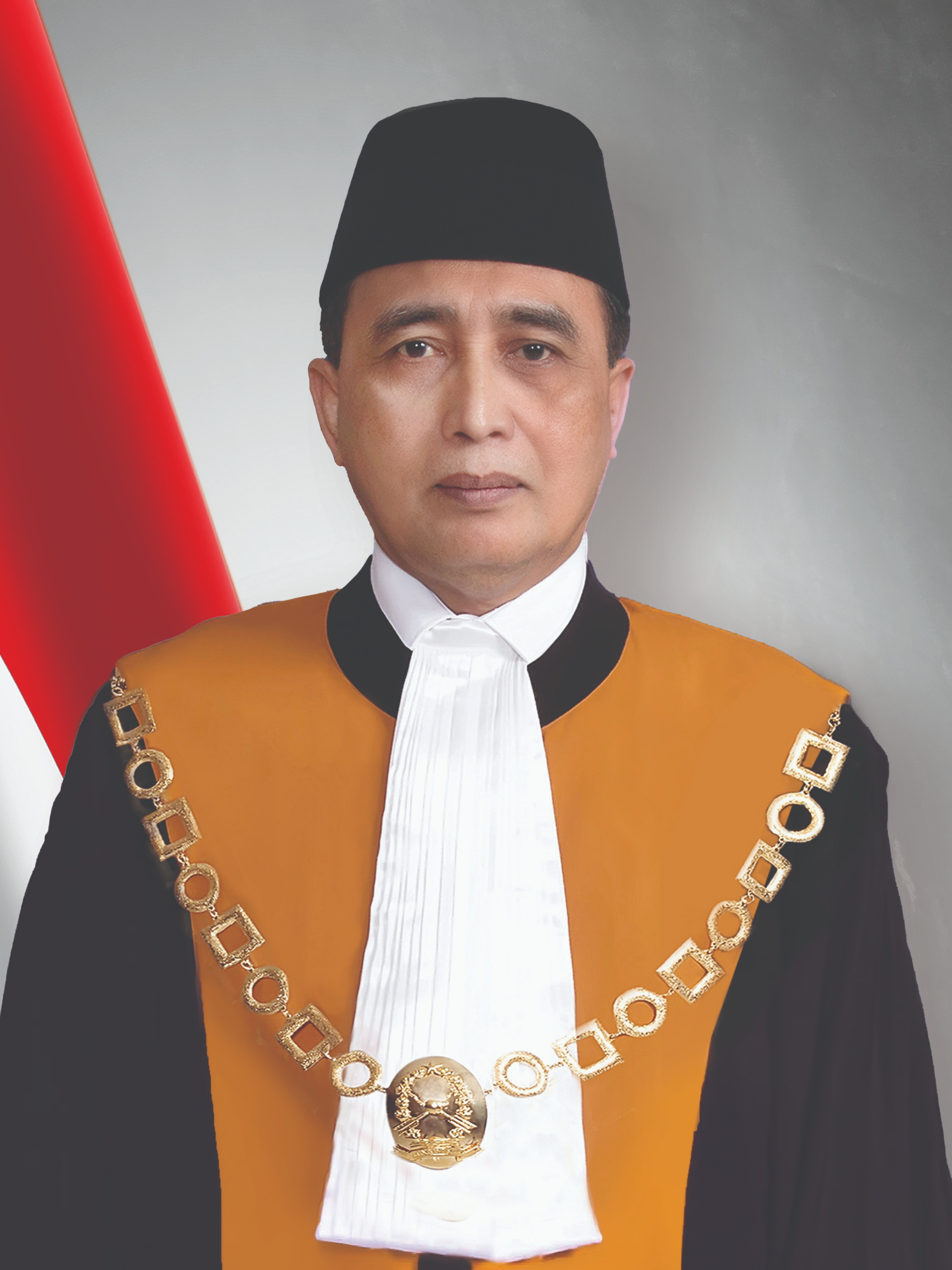
- Incumbent; Sunarto since 16 October 2024
- Supreme Court of Indonesia
- Seat: Jakarta
- Appointer: Supreme Court justices
- Formation: 19 August 1945
- First holder: Kusumah Atmaja
- Deputy: Deputy Chief Justice of the Supreme Court Indonesia

The chief justice of the Supreme Court of Indonesia (Indonesian: Ketua Mahkamah Agung) is the head of the Supreme Court of Indonesia.

== Election process ==
The chief justice and his or her deputy is elected by the Supreme Court justices from among the members of the court. Sometimes the process is controversial and attracts public criticism. For example, in early 2012 rumours about vote buying were reported in the Jakarta press as speculation mounted about the arrangements underway for the selection of new chief justice to replace Harifin Tumpa, who retired as chief justice in March 2012. It was said to be "all-out competition" for the post of chief justice because of the influence that the position holds and it was rumoured that the competition might include payments.

== List of chief justices ==
Photo	Name	Term		Term length (days)
	Kusumah Atmaja^{†}	19 August 1945	11 August 1952	2,549
	Wiryono Projodikoro	13 October 1952	21 June 1966	4,999
	Suryadi	21 June 1966	August 1968	
	Subekti	August 1968	22 January 1974	
	Umar Seno Aji	22 January 1974	18 February 1981	2,584
	Mujono	18 February 1981	24 April 1984	1,161
	Ali Said	24 April 1984	1 July 1992	2,990
	Purwoto Gandasubrata	12 August 1992	31 October 1994	810
	Suryono	1 November 1994	1 November 1996	731
	Sarwata	1 November 1996	1 August 2000	1,369
Vacant (1 August 2000 – 18 May 2001)
	Bagir Manan	18 May 2001	31 October 2008	2,723
	Harifin Tumpa	1 November 2008 (acting); 10 February 2009	1 March 2012	1,216
	Muhammad Hatta Ali	1 March 2012	30 April 2020	2,982
	Muhammad Syarifuddin	30 April 2020	16 October 2024	1,630
	Sunarto	16 October 2024	Incumbent	691

^{† Died in office}

== See also ==
- Chief Justice of the Constitutional Court of Indonesia
