= Supreme Court of Indonesia =

Supreme Court of the Republic of Indonesia
- Mahkamah Agung Republik Indonesia
- Seal of the Supreme Court

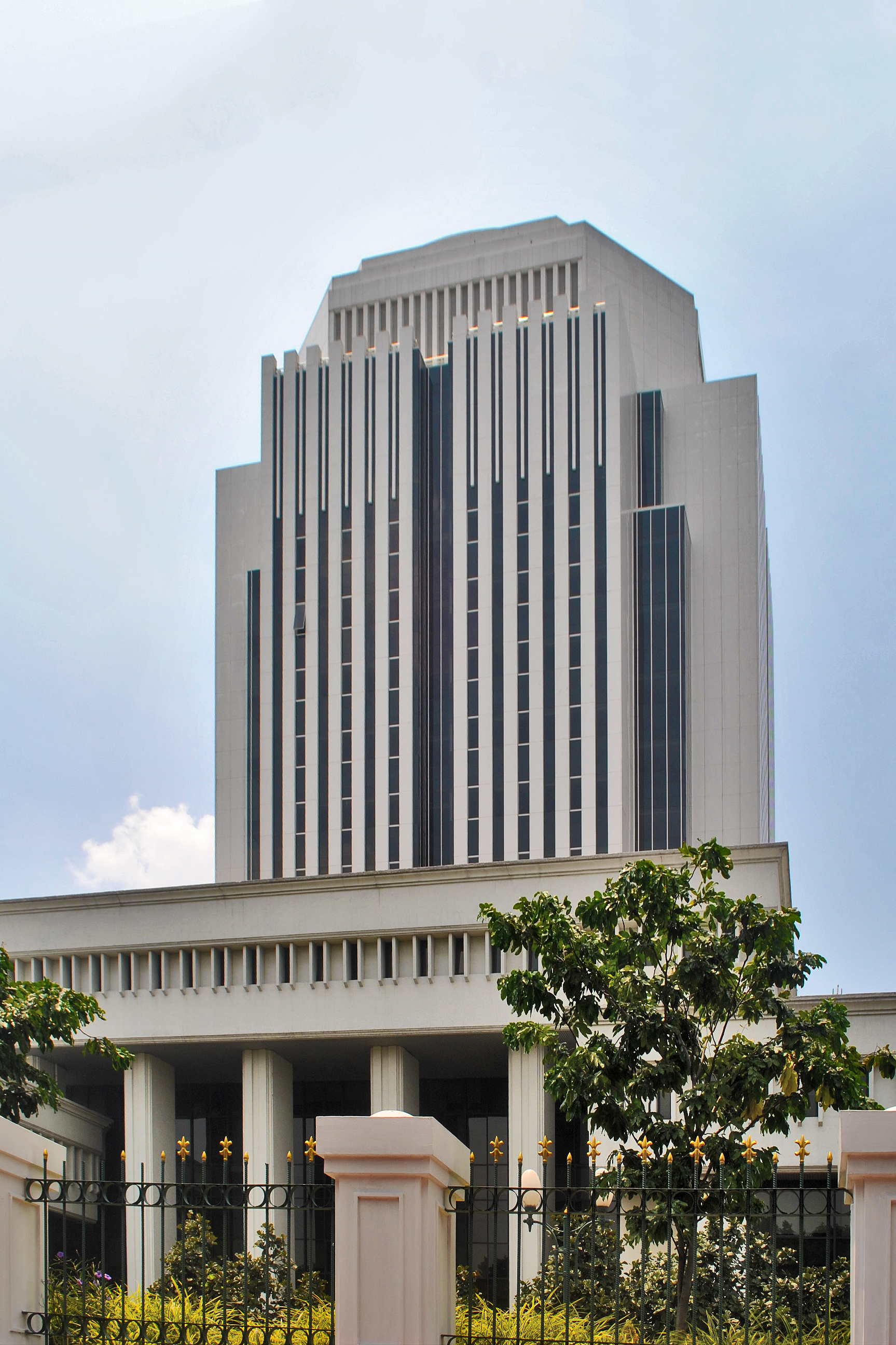
- The Supreme Court building in Jakarta
- Interactive map of Supreme Court of the Republic of Indonesia
- Established: 18 August 1945
- Jurisdiction: Indonesia
- Location: Jl. Medan Merdeka Utara No.9-13, Jakarta, Indonesia
- Motto: Dharmmayukti ("For the truest truth")
- Composition method: Nominated by the Judicial Commission with House of Representatives confirmation and Presidential appointment.
- Authorised by: Constitution of Indonesia
- Number of positions: 60 (maximum)
- Website: www.mahkamahagung.go.id

Chief Justice of the Supreme Court of Indonesia
- Currently: Sunarto
- Since: 16 October 2024

The Supreme Court of the Republic of Indonesia (Indonesian: Mahkamah Agung Republik Indonesia) is the independent judicial arm of the state. It maintains a system of courts and sits above the other courts and is the final court of appeal. It can also re-examine cases if new evidence emerges.

== Jurisdiction ==
The Supreme Court is independent as of the third amendment to the Constitution of Indonesia. The Supreme Court has oversight over the high courts (Pengadilan Tinggi) and district courts (Pengadilan Negeri). There are about 68 high courts: 31 General Courts, 29 Religious Courts, 4 Administrative Courts and 4 Military Courts. There are around 250 district courts with additional district courts being created from time to time. The Supreme Court is the final court of appeal (kasasi) following appeals from the district courts to the high courts. The Supreme Court can also re-examine cases if sufficient new evidence is found. Constitutional matters, however, fall within the jurisdiction of the Constitutional Court of Indonesia, established in 2003.

== Powers ==
The Supreme Court is empowered with several functions, as follow:

=== Adjudication ===
The Court serves as the highest court of the land and the final court of appeal in Indonesia. Along with them, the Court also have original jurisdiction over:

- all disputes regarding court jurisdiction;
- reviewing previous court decisions which have entered into force (Peninjauan Kembali); and
- all disputes which have arisen from the act of seizing foreign ships and their cargos by the Indonesian Navy.

In addition, the Court is empowered to conduct judicial review of all rules and regulations beneath the Act (Undang-Undang) enacted by the People's Representative Council and the President of Indonesia.

=== Monitoring ===
As the Supreme Court serves as the highest court, it works to ensure the professionalism and efficiency of all other courts below the Supreme Court, with respect to each individual judges' independence. The Court also supervises the administration of justice as well as lawyers and notaries as far as the court system is concerned.

=== Regulatory ===
The Supreme Court is empowered to regulate aspects of the administration of justice to fill any gaps yet to be covered by existing law, or to improve upon existing procedural law, if needed.

=== Advisory ===
The Supreme Court may provide legal advice to other high state institutions. It is best known for providing advice to the president as a constitutional requirement for enacting presidential clemency (Grasi) and legal rehabilitation.

=== Administrative ===
The Supreme Court through its Clerk Office (Kepaniteraan) and Secretariat (Kesekretariatan) provide administrative support and organizational regulation for other lesser courts to abide.

== Structure ==
As regulated by the 1985 Supreme Court Act (Indonesian: Undang-Undang Nomor 14 Tahun 1985 tentang Mahkamah Agung Republik Indonesia) and has since amended twice in 2004 and 2009, the Supreme Court's leadership consists of a Chief Justice, two Deputy Chief Justices, and several (currently seven) Chamber Presidents. The leadership term is five years, and the holders are elected among the sitting justices. The justices served as presidents and sitting judges in the chambers of the Supreme Court.

=== Leadership ===
- Chief Justice of the Supreme Court (Ketua Mahkamah Agung);
- Deputy Chief Justice of the Supreme Court on Judicial Affairs (Wakil Ketua Mahkamah Agung Bidang Yudisial), who assists the Chief Justice on judicial matters; and
- Deputy Chief Justice of the Supreme Court on Non-judicial Affairs (Wakil Ketua Mahkamah Agung Bidang Non-yudisial), who assists the Chief Justice on non-judicial matters, i.e. administrative and monitoring.

=== Chambers ===
After a series of organizational reform within the Court, all Supreme Court justices - except the Chief Justice and the two Deputy Chief Justices - are assigned to seven Chambers (Kamar). Presidents for five judicial chambers (civil, criminal, religious, military, and state administration chambers) are subordinated under the Deputy Chief Justice on Judicial Affairs, while the remaining two non-judicial chambers (fostering and monitoring chambers) are subordinated under the Deputy Chief Justice on Non-judicial Affairs.

- Chamber President for Civil Cases (Ketua Kamar Perdata);
- Chamber President for Criminal Cases (Ketua Kamar Pidana);
- Chamber President for Religious Cases (Ketua Kamar Agama);
- Chamber President for Military Cases (Ketua Kamar Militer);
- Chamber President for State Administrative Cases (Ketua Kamar Tata Usaha Negara);
- Chamber President for Fostering (Ketua Kamar Pembinaan); and
- Chamber President for Monitoring (Ketua Kamar Pengawasan).

=== Clerk Office ===
The Clerk Office of the Supreme Court (Kepaniteraan Mahkamah Agung) handles the judicial aspects of the administration of the Court. It is headed by the Supreme Court Chief Clerk (Panitera Mahkamah Agung) and subordinated under the leadership elements. The Clerk Office oversees several units, as follow.

- Deputy Clerk of Civil Cases (Panitera Muda Perdata);
- Deputy Clerk of Special Civil Cases (Panitera Muda Khusus Perdata);
- Deputy Clerk of Criminal Cases (Panitera Muda Pidana);
- Deputy Clerk of Special Criminal Cases (Panitera Muda Pidana Khusus);
- Deputy Clerk of Religious Civil Cases (Panitera Muda Perdata Agama);
- Deputy Clerk of Military Criminal Cases (Panitera Muda Pidana Militer);
- Deputy Clerk of State Administrative Cases (Panitera Muda Tata Usaha Negara); and
- Clerk Office Secretariat.

The junior clerks of the Supreme Court (Panitera Pengganti) are professional judges with at least ten years of experiences serving in the first-level courts. Meanwhile, the deputy clerks must have experiences heading a second-level courts. The junior and deputy clerks are nominated by the chief clerk and appointed by the chief justice.

The chief clerk is nominated by the chief justice and appointed by the president, after serving at least two years as Supreme Court deputy clerk and at least three years as head clerk in a second-level courts.

=== Secretariat ===
The Secretariat of the Supreme Court (Kesekretariatan Mahkamah Agung) handles the non-judicial aspects of the administration of the Court. It is headed by the Supreme Court Secretary (Sekretaris Mahkamah Agung) and subordinated under the leadership elements. According to its last regulation, Presidential Decree No. 21/2024, the Secretariat oversees several units, as follow.

- Directorate General on Public Court System (Direktorat Jenderal Badan Peradilan Umum), headed by a director general, and oversees several subdivisions:
  - Directorate of Public Court Technical Support Fostering
  - Directorate of Public Court Fostering
  - Directorate of Administration and Management of Civil Cases
  - Directorate of Administration and Management of Criminal Cases
  - Directorate General Secretariat
- Directorate General on Religious Court System (Direktorat Jenderal Badan Peradilan Agama), headed by a director general, and oversees several subdivisions:
  - Directorate of Religious Court Technical Support Fostering
  - Directorate of Religious Court Administration Fostering
  - Directorate of Administration and Management of Religious Civil Cases
  - Directorate General Secretariat.
- Directorate General on Military and State Administrative Court System (Direktorat Jenderal Badan Peradilan Militer dan Peradilan Tata Usaha Negara), headed by a director general, and oversees several subdivisions:
  - Directorate of Military Court Technical Support Fostering
  - Directorate of State Administrative Court Technical Support Fostering
  - Directorate of Administration and Management of Military Criminal Cases
  - Directorate of Administration and Management of State Administrative Cases
  - Directorate General Secretariat.
- Monitoring Office (Badan Pengawasan), headed by a chief inspector, and oversees several subdivisions:
  - Regional Inspectorate I, overseeing courts in Sumatra
  - Regional Inspectorate II, overseeing courts in Java and Bali
  - Regional Inspectorate III, overseeing courts in Kalimantan and Sulawesi
  - Regional Inspectorate IV, overseeing courts in Nusa Tenggara, the Moluccas, and Papua
  - Monitoring Office Secretariat
- Agency on Strategic Policies, Education, and Training of Law and Justice (Badan Strategi Kebijakan, Pendidikan, dan Pelatihan Hukum dan Peradilan), headed by an agency head, and oversees several subdivisions:
  - Research and Development Center for Law and Justice
  - Education and Training Center for Judicial Technicalities
  - Education and Training Center for Management and Leadership; and
  - Agency Secretariat.
- General Administration Office (Badan Urusan Administrasi), headed by an office head, and oversees several subdivisions:
  - Bureau of Planning and Organization
  - Bureau of Human Resources
  - Bureau of Finance
  - Bureau of Equipment
  - Bureau of Executive Secretariat
  - Bureau of Law and Public Relations
  - Bureau of General Affairs.

The Supreme Court Secretary is nominated by the chief clerk and appointed by the chief justice.

== Justices ==
According to the Constitution, candidates for Supreme Court Justices are required to have integrity and be of good character as well as be experienced in law. Candidates are proposed to the House of Representatives by the Judicial Commission. If the House of Representatives approves them, their appointment is then confirmed by the president. As of mid 2011, there was a total of 804 courts of various kinds in Indonesia. About 50 justices sat in the Supreme Court while other high and lower courts across Indonesia employed around 7,000 judges. Officially, the Supreme Court consists of 51 justices divided into 8 chambers.

There are two Deputies Chief Justice: one for Judicial Affairs, which oversees the Civil Chamber, Criminal Chamber, Religious Chamber, Military Chamber, and State Administrative Chamber; the other one is for Non-Judicial Affairs, which oversees the Legal Development Chamber and Supervision Chamber. The current Deputy Chief Justice for Judicial Affairs is Sunarto, who was elected to the position on 3 April 2023. The current Deputy Chief Justice for Non-Judicial Affairs is Suharto, who was elected to the position on 15 May 2024.

The specialized Chambers are currently presided by the following justices, based on the date of their election to the position:

- President of the Legal Development Chamber: Takdir Rahmadi (elected on 23 December 2014)
- President of the State Administrative Chamber: Yulius (9 November 2022)
- President of the Religious Chamber: Amran Suadi (12 April 2017)
- President of the Military Chamber: Burhan Dahlan (9 October 2018)
- President of the Criminal Chamber: Vacant (15 May 2024)
- President of the Civil Chamber: I Gusti Agung Sumanantha (21 February 2020)
- President of the Supervisory Chamber: Dwiarso Budi Santiarto (21 July 2023)

Before April 2013, Chamber Presidents are referred as Associates Chief Justice (Ketua Muda), but was changed into Chamber President (Ketua Kamar) by Chief Justice Hatta Ali.

The leadership election is often controversial and attracts public criticism. For example, in early 2012 rumours about vote buying were reported in the Jakarta press as speculation mounted about the arrangements underway for the selection of new chief justice to replace Harifin A. Tumpa, who retired as Chief Justice in March 2012. There was said to be "all-out competition" for the post of Chief Justice because of the influence that the position holds and it was rumoured that the competition might include payments.

== Conduct of court business ==
Like most of the Indonesian legal system, the Supreme Court is badly overloaded with demands on resources. One observer has noted that "the Supreme Court is drowning in an increasing flood of new cases each year". In 2010, for example, there were reportedly more than 22,000 cases before the court of which the court managed to rule on fewer than 14,000. Partly in response to pressures of this kind, proposals for reform of the way that court business is conducted have been under consideration for some time. Current proposals (2011) indicate that a new chamber structure will be introduced to try to improve the operations of the court. The plan is to introduce a system of five chambers which will deal with criminal, civil, religious, administrative, and military affairs. However, the changes are controversial so further reforms may be needed in due course.

The funding for the Supreme Court allocated from the national government budget in 2010 was slightly over Rp 6.0 trillion (around $US 700 million at the prevailing foreign exchange rate).

One significant problem for the Indonesian legal system overall (although less so for the Supreme Court itself) is that most Indonesian judges in lower courts are not well paid. The official base salary of a judge, before some additional allowances, is often below $US 300 per month. As a result, some judges are tempted to accept bribes in the course of their duties. The low salaries paid to judges have been a source of much attention in Indonesia recently with judges urging the government and parliament to tackle the issue, and even threatening to go on strike over the matter. Inevitably, poor performance and difficulties in lower courts leads to problems for the Supreme Court in the efforts by the Court to establish legal standards across the country. These problems receive considerable attention in Indonesia and there is much public discussion about the best ways to promote reform.

There are, at times, criticisms of the way that the court administers itself. In May 2014, for example, the Supreme Court justices collectively agreed to the use of the court budget to hire a special jet to take more than 180 justices to the Wakatobi diving resort in Southeast Sulawesi. Participants on the tour were housed in various hotels as the expense of the court. Judicial watchdog groups and others criticised the court although court officials defended the arrangement.

== Enforcement of rulings ==
One common criticism of the legal system in Indonesia is that law enforcement is weak. Even when the law is clear, and even when courts issue clear rulings, enforcement is often weak. In recent years, this criticism has often been made of the operations of the Supreme Court in Indonesia as well of the operations of other parts of the Indonesian legal system. The issue is, in principle, a serious matter for the Supreme Court because enforcement of the rulings of the Supreme Court sets standards for the enforcement of rulings across much of the rest of the Indonesian legal system.

The central problem appears to be that the institutions and mechanisms for enforcement of the legal system, including the decisions of the Supreme Court, are underfunded and are operationally weak. There are thus numerous instances of long delays in the enforcement of the decisions of the Supreme Court. As just one example, in a well publicised case, one of Indonesia's leading universities, the Bogor Agricultural Institute, was instructed by the Supreme Court to release certain details of controversial research conducted within the institute relating to the testing of formula milk brands on sale in Indonesia. However following the Supreme Court ruling, the institute failed to comply and even failed to pay a trivial fee (around $230) incurred as a result of certain proceedings during the conduct of the case. Numerous other cases of delays are regularly reported in the Indonesian media and are commented on by lawyers who have won cases in the Supreme Court.

== Buildings of the Supreme Court ==
=== Lapangan Banteng (1946-1989) ===
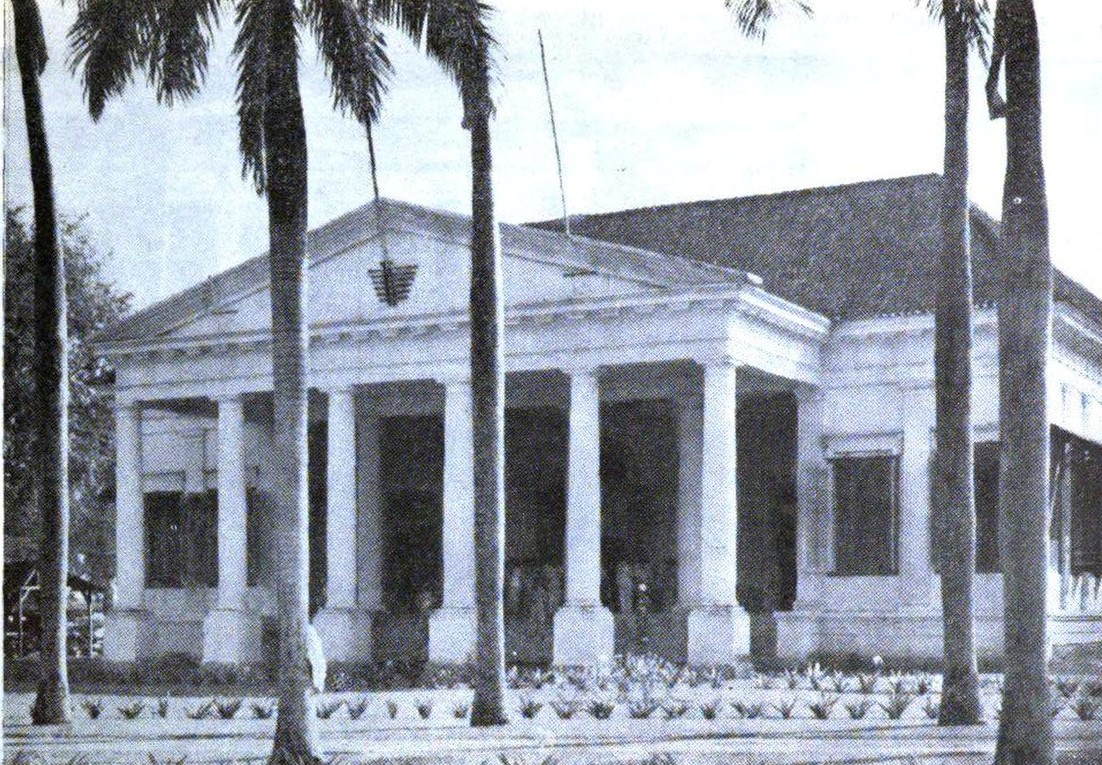
The Old Supreme Court Building on Lapangan Banteng Timur street, occupied between 1946 and 1989.

The supreme court was first housed in 1 Lapangan Banteng Timur street in Jakarta, close to the Waterloosplein (now Lapangan Banteng, Jakarta). The classical style building were previously used as the Hoggerechtshof te Batavia (an appellate court named the High Court of Batavia, now High Court of Jakarta). Currently, it is occupied and managed by the Ministry of Finance, who also occupied and managed the Paleis van Daendels building next door.

The Hoggerechtshof building that were designed by architect Ir. Tramp and completed in 1825 during governor general Du Bus' tenure, were initially used as the headquarters for the Governor General of the Dutch East Indies. Then on 1 May 1848, the building were used by the recently established Departement van Justitie (Department of Justice), which oversaw the court system and the administration of justice in the colony. Sometimes later, the classical style building with six pillars on the front were fully used as the Hoggerechtshof, which included the prosecutor's office.

Throughout the early Indonesian independence period and with the enactment of Government Edict No. 9/1946, Jakarta — and by extension the Hoggerechtshof building — was selected as the seat of the independent Indonesia's supreme court. Through the 1947 Act on the Organization and Authority of the Supreme Court and the Attorney General's Office (Indonesian: Undang-Undang Nomor 7 Tahun 1947 tentang Susunan Organisasi dan Kekuasaan Mahkamah Agung dan Kejaksaan Agung), it reaffirmed the relation between the supreme court and the attorney general's office, which by this point were still part of the court system.

During the re-occupation of Jakarta in 1947 by Dutch forces in the attempt to recover the East Indies, they also re-established its own court system and its own Hoggerechtshof in occupied Jakarta, with 5 justices and one procureur-general. Indonesian supreme court and its administration then temporarily moved with the republican government to Yogyakarta until 1950, when following the conclusion of conflict between Indonesia and the Netherlands, and the formation of the United States of Indonesia, they returned to Jakarta.

=== Medan Merdeka Utara (1989-present) ===
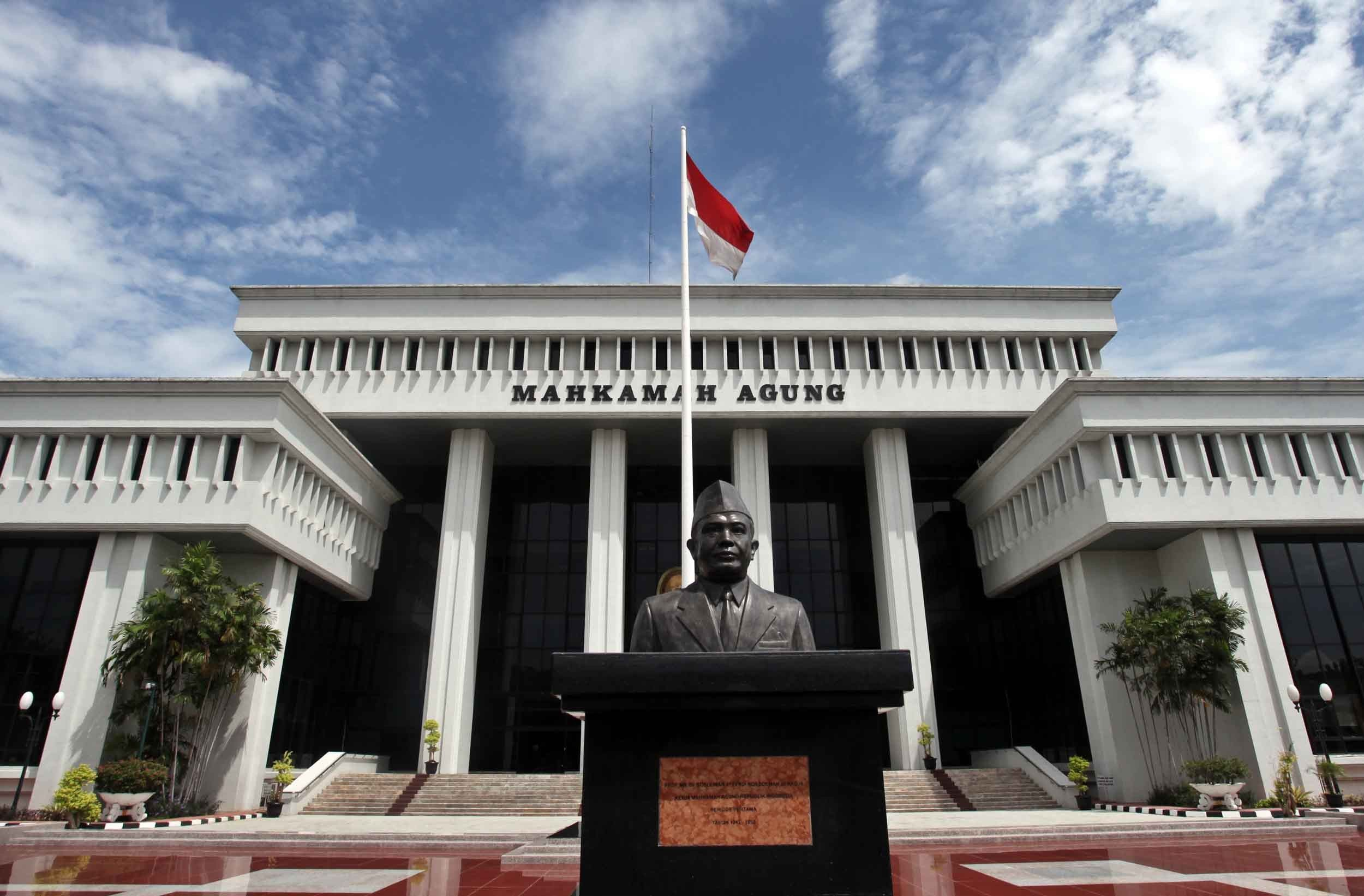
The current Supreme Court Building on Medan Merdeka Utara street, prior to the construction of the Main Office Tower in 2015.

During the tenure of chief justice Ali Said dan later chief justice Purwoto Suhadi Gandasubrata in the 1980s, it was decided to move the court from the old building to a plot located on Medan Merdeka Utara street, across Merdeka Palace on the north side of Merdeka Square, previously used by Pertamina, which in the past used as a Nestle confectionary site. The plot alongside the Pertamina building were sold to the government following Pertamina's financial crisis and restructurization in the 1970s. The reason for the move being that the old building can no longer accommodate the ever expanding court.

On 17 February 1986 the construction formally began with PT. Nindya Karya as the project contractor, using the design provided by Arkonin, an architecture company. By the completion of Blok A to E in 1989 the project cost between 14 and 17 billion Rupiah, and was officially opened by president Soeharto on 10 August 1989, where the Supreme Court Building stands to this day on 9-13 Medan Merdeka Utara street. Between 2003 and 2008 Building F, G, and H were constructed in the style of the original building. In 2013 the largest addition to the complex were constructed, an 86-meter, 17-story office tower built on top of Blok E, again designed by Arkonin and constructed by Waskita Karya. The construction was finished by 31 December 2015, and officially opened on 31 January 2017. The office tower construction cost around 243 billion Rupiah.

== See also ==
- Daming Sunusi
- Constitutional Court of Indonesia
- Chief Justice of the Supreme Court of Indonesia
- Deputy Chief Justice of the Supreme Court of Indonesia
