= Suharto =

President of Indonesia from 1967 to 1998

- Official portrait, c. 1987

2nd President of Indonesia
- In office 12 March 1967 – 21 May 1998 (Note: De facto rule over the Republic of Indonesia (1965–1967): On 1 October 1965 Suharto took command of the Army and later even announced over the radio that he was now in command of the Army and that he would destroy the counter-revolutionary forces and save Sukarno. Major General Suharto was in control of the reserve, and upon hearing the news of the takeover, he quickly capitalised on the movement's weaknesses, regaining control of the square without resistance. Following the surrender, the movement's troops did not take further action. At the same time, the Indonesian military slowly gained influence as Sukarno's waned, and within days, the government was under the control of Suharto. He immediately deployed troops and dispersed the movement while trumpeting the movement's actions as a "danger" to the nation. A military propaganda campaign to link the coup attempt with the PKI, masterminded by Suharto and the military, began to sweep the country on 5 October (the Armed Forces Day and the day of the six generals' state funeral). Even though the 30 September Movement killed 12 people, Suharto ultimately presented it as a nationwide conspiracy to commit mass murder. Ten day's after the failed coup d'état attempt Suharto, accepted President Sukarno's order to take control of the army on condition that he be handed full authority to restore order and security, an arrangement that was formalised by creating Kopkamtib which happened on the 10 October 1965. During the Indonesian mass killings Suharto commanded a firm hold on the armed forces. Early fighting in the Central Java highlands and around Madiun suggested the PKI might be able to establish a rival regime centred on these regions. However, widespread fears of a civil war between factions supported by the United States and China, respectively, quickly evaporated as the forces sent by Suharto took control. On 11 March 1966, Sukarno transferred key presidential powers to Suharto in a letter of authority known as Supersemar. On 20 February 1967, Sukarno surrendered his powers, but he was not formally relieved of his presidential title by the provisional parliament (MPRS) until 12 March 1967.); Acting until 27 March 1968
- Vice President: See list: Vacant (1967‍–‍1973); Hamengkubuwono IX (1973‍–‍1978); Adam Malik (1978‍–‍1983); Umar Wirahadikusumah (1983‍–‍1988); Sudharmono (1988‍–‍1993); Try Sutrisno (1993‍–‍1998); B. J. Habibie (1998)
- Preceded by: Sukarno
- Succeeded by: B. J. Habibie

Chairman of the Cabinet Presidium
- In office 25 July 1966 – 17 October 1967
- President: Sukarno; Himself (acting)
- Preceded by: Sukarno (as Prime Minister)
- Succeeded by: Office abolished

13th Minister of Defense and Security
- In office 28 March 1966 – 9 September 1971
- President: Sukarno; Himself
- Preceded by: Sarbini Martodihardjo
- Succeeded by: Maraden Panggabean

16th Secretary-General of the Non-Aligned Movement
- In office 7 September 1992 – 20 October 1995
- Preceded by: Dobrica Ćosić
- Succeeded by: Ernesto Samper
Military offices
1st and 4th Commander of Kopkamtib
In office 28 January 1974 – 17 April 1978
President	Himself
Preceded by	Sumitro
Succeeded by	Sudomo
In office 5 October 1965 – 19 November 1969
Preceded by	Office established
Succeeded by	Maraden Panggabean
5th Commander of the Armed Forces of the Republic of Indonesia
In office 6 June 1968 – 28 March 1973
President	Himself
Preceded by	Abdul Haris Nasution (1966)
Succeeded by	Maraden Panggabean
7th Chief of Staff of the Indonesian Army
In office 16 October 1965 – 1 May 1968
President	Sukarno; Himself
Preceded by	Ahmad Yani; Pranoto Reksosamudro (acting)
Succeeded by	Maraden Panggabean
1st Commander of the Strategic Reserve
In office 6 March 1961 – 2 December 1965
President	Sukarno
Preceded by	Office established
Succeeded by	Umar Wirahadikusumah

Personal details
- Born: 8 June 1921 Bantoel, Dutch East Indies
- Died: 27 January 2008 (aged 86) Jakarta, Indonesia
- Resting place: Astana Giribangun
- Party: Golkar
- Spouse: Siti Hartinah (m. 1947; died 1996)
- Children: 6, including Tutut, Titiek, and Tommy Suharto
- Parents: Kertosudiro (father); Sukirah (mother)
- Education: KNIL Kadetschool
- Occupation: Politician; military officer
- Nicknames: Pak Harto; Smiling General

Military service
- Branch/service: Dutch East Indies Army; Defenders of the Homeland; Indonesian Army
- Years of service: 1940–1974
- Rank: Grand general
- Unit: Infantry (Kostrad)
- Commands: See list: Kodam IV/Diponegoro; Kostrad/Caduad; Indonesian Army; Kopkamtib; Indonesian Armed Forces
- Battles/wars: See list: Indonesian National Revolution; Battle of Kotabaru; Battle of Ambarawa; Operation Product; Madiun Affair; Operation Kraai; March offensive; Darul Islam rebellion; 426 Battalion rebellion; Makassar uprising; PRRI rebellion; Permesta rebellion; West New Guinea dispute; Operation Trikora; Operation Dwikora; 30 September Movement; Indonesian mass killings
- Awards: National Hero (2025); List of awards
- Service no.: 10684
- Suharto's voice Suharto announcing his resignation following the 1997 Asian financial crisis and the May 1998 riots Recorded 21 May 1998

Suharto (Note: /suːˈhɑːrtoʊ/; Indonesian: [suˈharto]; Under the old Van Ophuijsen Spelling System, his name was spelled as Soeharto.) (8 June 1921 – 27 January 2008) was an Indonesian military general and politician who served as the second and longest-serving president of Indonesia from 1967 to 1998.

Suharto was born in Kemusuk, near the city of Yogyakarta, during the Dutch colonial era. He grew up in humble circumstances. His Javanese Muslim parents divorced not long after his birth, and he lived with foster parents for much of his childhood. During the Japanese occupation, Suharto served in the Japanese-organized Indonesian security forces. During Indonesia's independence struggle, he joined the newly formed Indonesian Army and rose to the rank of major general some time after full Indonesian independence was achieved. An attempted coup on 30 September and 1 October 1965 was countered by Suharto-led troops. The army subsequently led a nationwide violent anti-communist purge. In March 1967, the MPRS appointed Suharto as acting president, and he was appointed president the following year. When Suharto came to power, inflation was running at over 650%. He appointed an economic advisory group that implemented free market policies, and by 1969 the country entered a period of price stability. Suharto ordered an invasion of East Timor in 1975, followed by a 23-year occupation of the country and genocide.

Under his "New Order" regime, Suharto established a strong, centralised government dominated by the military, evolving from an initial oligarchic military dictatorship into a deeply authoritarian state centred on a cult of personality that elevated him as the nation's undisputed dictator. His staunch anti-communist stance and ability to maintain political stability across Indonesia's vast and diverse archipelago secured significant economic and diplomatic backing from Western powers, particularly the United States, during the Cold War. During much of his presidency, Indonesia underwent rapid industrialisation, sustained economic growth (with GDP growing at around 7% per annum) improved education, and a rise in domestic entrepreneurship, developments that led the People's Consultative Assembly (MPR) to name him "Father of Development" (Indonesian: Bapak Pembangunan) in 1982. In 1986, he was awarded the Ceres Medal by the United Nations Food and Agriculture Organization (FAO) for achieving self-sufficiency in rice production. However, by the 1990s, his regime's increasing authoritarianism and widespread corruption fueled public dissatisfaction, which reached a breaking point during the 1997 Asian financial crisis that plunged the country into economic turmoil and widespread unrest. Under immense pressure, Suharto resigned in May 1998 after more than three decades in power. Suharto died in January 2008 and received a state military funeral with full honors. The Indonesian government declared a week of national mourning.

Suharto was widely regarded as a military dictator by international observers. His 32-year presidency and legacy are highly divisive, and he remains a controversial figure among the Indonesian general public. He has been praised for making Indonesia into an economic success story, bringing stability to the region particularly during the Cold War period, and leading Indonesia when it played a significant role in international affairs. Others denounce his authoritarian rule, widespread corruption, (Note: According to Transparency International, Suharto was one of the most corrupt leaders in modern history, having embezzled an alleged US$15–35 billion during his rule.) and extensive human rights violations. His 31-year dictatorship is considered one of the most brutal and corrupt of the 20th century: he was central to the perpetration of mass killings against alleged communists and subsequent persecution of ethnic Chinese, Islamists, irreligious people, and trade unionists.

== Name ==
Like many Javanese, Suharto had only one name. The spelling "Suharto" reflects modern Indonesian orthography, although the general approach in Indonesia is to rely on the spelling preferred by the person concerned. At the time of his birth, the standard transcription was "Soeharto", and he used the original spelling throughout his life. The international English-language press generally uses the spelling "Suharto", while the Indonesian government and media use "Soeharto".

After completing the Hajj in 1991, he was given the Islamic name "Mohammad" by King Fahd of Saudi Arabia and received the honorific title Hajji. Throughout the 1990s and until his death, Suharto used the name "Haji Mohammad Suharto".

== Early life and family ==
Suharto was born on 8 June 1921 in a plaited-bamboo-walled house in the hamlet of Kemusuk, a part of the larger village of Godean, then part of the Dutch East Indies. The village is 15 kilometres (9 mi) west of Yogyakarta, the cultural heartland of the Javanese. Born to ethnic Javanese parents, he was the only child of his father's second marriage. His father, Kertosudiro, had two children from his previous marriage and was a village irrigation official. His mother, Sukirah, a local woman, was distantly related to Hamengkubuwono V by his first concubine. Five weeks after Suharto's birth, his mother suffered a nervous breakdown; he was placed in the care of his paternal great-aunt, Kromodirjo as a result. Kertosudiro and Sukirah divorced early in Suharto's life and both later remarried. At the age of three, Suharto was returned to his mother, who had married a local farmer whom Suharto helped in the rice paddies. In 1929, Suharto's father took him to live with his sister, who was married to an agricultural supervisor, Prawirowihardjo, in the town of Wuryantoro in a poor and low-yielding farming area near Wonogiri. Over the following two years, he was taken back to his mother in Kemusuk by his stepfather and then back again to Wuryantoro by his father.

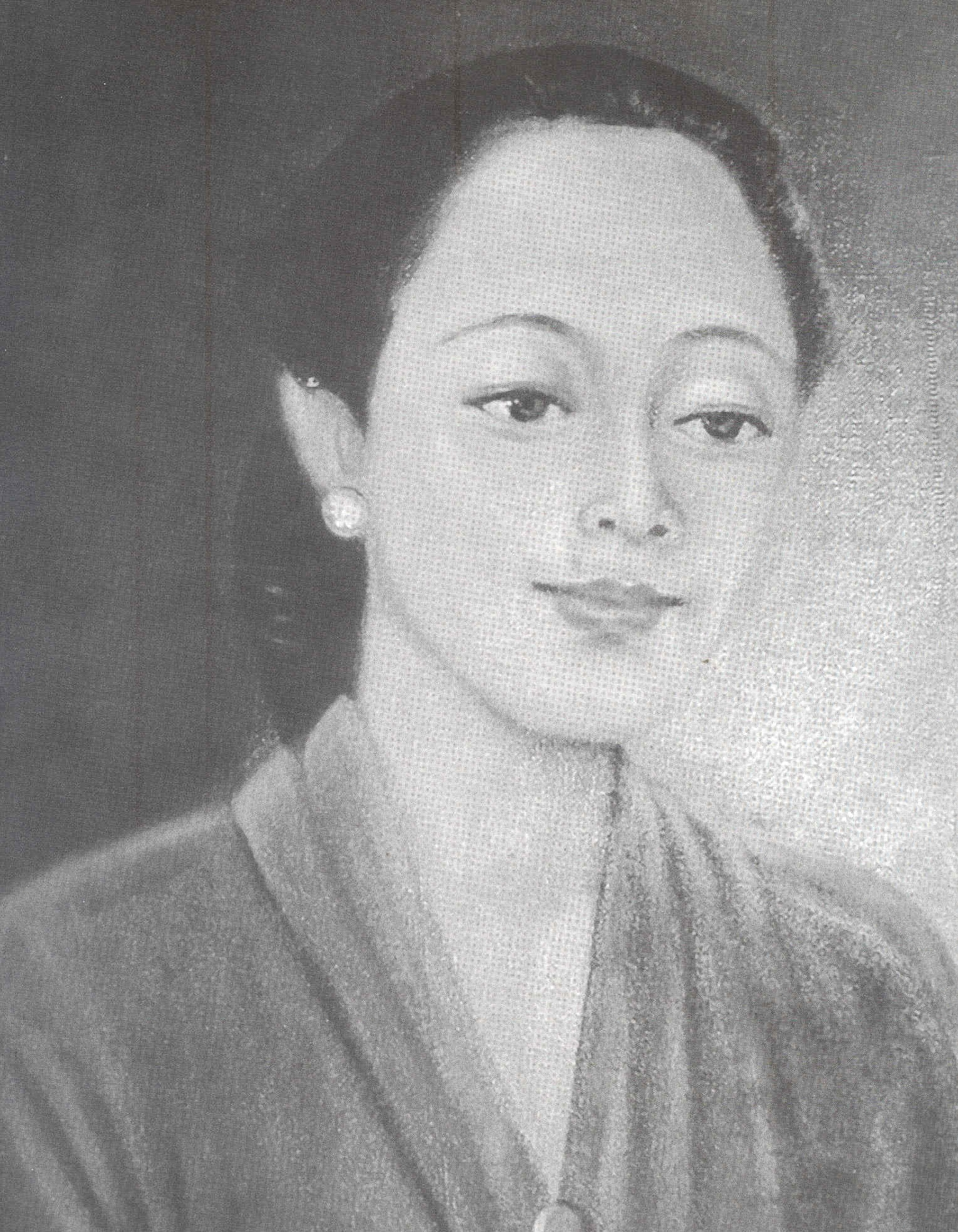
Sukirah, Suharto's mother. Painting from the collection of National Library of Indonesia.

Prawirowihardjo took to raising the boy as his own, which provided Suharto with a father-figure and a stable home in Wuryantoro. In 1931, he moved to the town of Wonogiri to attend the primary school, living first with Prawirohardjo's son Sulardi, and later with his father's relative Hardjowijono. While living with Hardjowijono, Suharto became acquainted with Darjatmo, a dukun ("shaman") of Javanese mystical arts and faith healing. The experience deeply affected him and later, as president, Suharto surrounded himself with powerful symbolic language. Difficulties in paying the fees for his education in Wonogiri resulted in another move back to his father in Kemusuk, where he continued studying at a lower-fee Schakel Muhammadiyah (middle school) in the city of Yogyakarta until 1938. Suharto's upbringing contrasts with that of leading Indonesian nationalists such as Sukarno in that he is believed to have had little interest in anti-colonialism, or political concerns beyond his immediate surroundings. Unlike Sukarno and his circle, Suharto had little or no contact with European colonisers. Consequently, he did not learn to speak Dutch or other European languages in his youth. He learned to speak Dutch after his induction into the Dutch military in 1940.

== Military service ==
=== Japanese occupation period ===
Suharto finished middle school at the age of 18 and took a clerical job at a bank in Wuryantaro. He was forced to resign after a bicycle mishap tore his only working clothes. Following a spell of unemployment, he joined the Royal Netherlands East Indies Army (KNIL) in June 1940 and undertook basic training in Gombong near Yogyakarta. With the Netherlands under German occupation and the Japanese pressing for access to Indonesian oil supplies, the Dutch had opened up the KNIL to large intakes of previously excluded Javanese. Suharto was assigned to Battalion XIII at Rampal, graduated from a short training course at KNIL Kadetschool in Gombong to become a sergeant, and was posted to a KNIL reserve battalion in Cisarua. Following the Dutch surrender to the invading Japanese forces in March 1942, Suharto abandoned his KNIL uniform and went back to Wurjantoro. After months of unemployment, he then became one of the thousands of Indonesians who took the opportunity to join Japanese-organized security forces by joining the Yogyakarta police force.

In October 1943, Suharto was transferred from the police force to the newly formed Japanese-sponsored militia, the Pembela Tanah Air (PETA) in which Indonesians served as officers. In his training to serve with the rank of shodancho (platoon commander) he encountered a localised version of the Japanese bushido, or "way of the warrior", used to indoctrinate troops. This training encouraged an anti-Dutch and pro-nationalist thought, although toward the aims of the Imperial Japanese militarists. The encounter with a nationalistic and militarist ideology is believed to have profoundly influenced Suharto's own way of thinking. Suharto was posted to a PETA coastal defense battalion at Wates, south of Yogyakarta until he was admitted for training for chudancho (company commander) in Bogor from April to August 1944. As company commander, he conducted training for new PETA recruits in Surakarta, Jakarta, and Madiun. The Japanese surrender and Proclamation of Indonesian Independence in August 1945 occurred while Suharto was posted to the remote Brebeg area (on the slopes of Mount Wilis) to train new NCOs to replace those executed by the Japanese in the aftermath of the failed February 1945 PETA Revolt in Blitar, led by Supriyadi.

=== Indonesian National Revolution ===
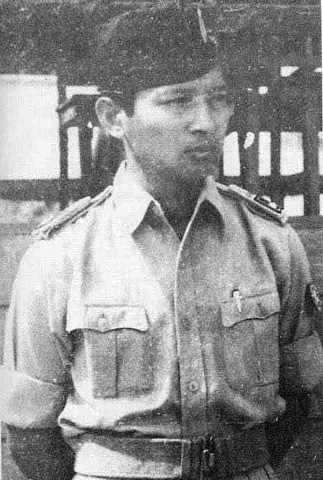
Lieutenant Colonel Suharto, c. 1947

Two days after the Japanese surrender in the Pacific, independence leaders Sukarno and Hatta declared Indonesian independence and were appointed president and vice-president respectively of the new Republic. Suharto disbanded his regiment under orders from the Japanese command and returned to Yogyakarta. As republican groups rose to assert Indonesian independence, Suharto joined a new unit of the newly formed Indonesian army. Based on his PETA experience, he was appointed deputy commander, and subsequently, a battalion commander when the republican forces were formally organized in October 1945. Suharto was involved in fighting against Allied troops around Magelang and Semarang and was subsequently appointed the head of a brigade as lieutenant-colonel, having earned respect as a field commander. In the early years of the war, he organized local armed forces into Battalion X of Regiment I; Suharto was promoted to Major and became Battalion X's leader. The arrival of the Allies, under a mandate to return the situation to the status quo ante bellum, quickly led to clashes between Indonesian republicans and Allied forces, i.e. returning Dutch and assisting British forces.

Suharto led his Division X troops to halt an advance by the Dutch T ("Tiger") Brigade on 17 May 1946. It earned him the respect of Lieutenant-Colonel Sunarto Kusumodirjo, who invited him to draft the working guidelines for the Battle Leadership Headquarters (MPP), a body created to organize and unify the command structure of the Indonesian Nationalist forces. The military forces of the still infant Republic of Indonesia were constantly restructuring. By August 1946, Suharto was head of the 22nd Regiment of Division III (the "Diponegoro Division") stationed in Yogyakarta. In late 1946, the Diponegoro Division assumed responsibility for the defence of the west and southwest of Yogyakarta from Dutch forces. Conditions at the time are reported by Dutch sources as miserable; Suharto himself is reported as assisting smuggling syndicates in the transport of opium through the territory he controlled, to generate income. In September 1948, Suharto was dispatched to meet Musso, chairman of the Indonesian Communist Party (PKI) in an unsuccessful attempt at a peaceful reconciliation of the communist uprising in Madiun.

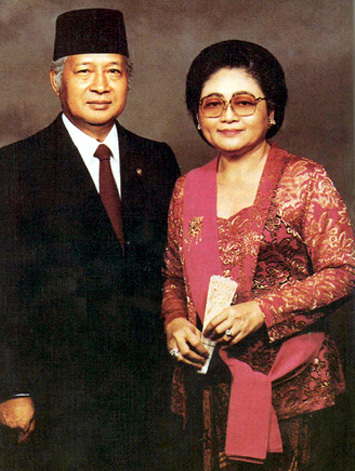
Portrait of Suharto and Siti Hartinah, date unknown

In December 1948, the Dutch launched "Operation Kraai", which resulted in the capture of Sukarno and Hatta and the capital Yogyakarta. Suharto was appointed to lead the Wehrkreise III, consisting of two battalions, which waged guerrilla warfare against the Dutch from the hills south of Yogyakarta. In dawn raids on 1 March 1949, Suharto's forces and local militia recaptured the city, holding it until noon. Suharto's later accounts had him as the lone plotter, although other sources say Sultan Hamengkubuwono IX of Yogyakarta, and the Panglima of the Third Division ordered the attack. However, General Abdul Nasution said that Suharto took great care in preparing the "General Offensive" (Indonesian: Serangan Umum). Civilians sympathetic to the Republican cause within the city had been galvanised by the show of force which proved that the Dutch had failed to win the guerrilla war. Internationally, the United Nations Security Council pressured the Dutch to cease the military offensive and to recommence negotiations, which eventually led to the Dutch withdrawal from the Yogyakarta area in June 1949 and to complete transfer of sovereignty in December 1949. Suharto was responsible for the takeover of Yogyakarta city from the withdrawing Dutch in June 1949.

During the Revolution, Suharto married Siti Hartinah (known as Tien), the daughter of a minor noble in the Mangkunegaran royal house of Solo. The arranged marriage was enduring and supportive, lasting until Tien's death in 1996. The couple had six children: Siti Hardiyanti Rukmana (Tutut, born 1949), Sigit Harjojudanto (born 1951), Bambang Trihatmodjo (born 1953), Siti Hediati Hariyadi (Titiek, born 1959), Hutomo Mandala Putra (Tommy, born 1962), and Siti Hutami Endang Adiningish (Mamiek, born 1964). It was characteristic of a military family's life that three of their children were born when Suharto was on duty and away from his family. Their first child was born when Suharto was fighting in a guerrilla war outside of Yogyakarta. He did not see their first daughter for three months after her birth. Their second child, a son, was born while Suharto was serving in South Sulawesi. Another, their fifth child (and third son), was born when he was leading the Mandala Command for the Liberation of West Irian.

=== Post-independence career ===
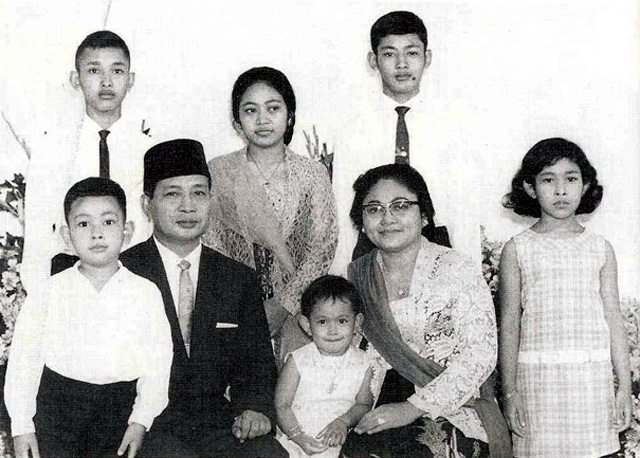
Suharto with his wife and six children, c. 1967

In the years following Indonesian independence, Suharto served in the Indonesian National Army, primarily in Java. In 1950, as a colonel, he led the Garuda Brigade in suppressing the Makassar uprising, a rebellion of former colonial soldiers who supported the Dutch-established State of East Indonesia and its federal entity, the United States of Indonesia. During his year in Makassar, Suharto became acquainted with his neighbours, the Habibie family, whose eldest son BJ Habibie was later Suharto's vice-president, and went on to succeed him as president. In 1951–1952, Suharto led his troops in defeating the Islamic-inspired rebellion of Battalion 426 in the Klaten area of Central Java. Appointed to lead four battalions in early 1953, he organized their participation in battling Darul Islam insurgents in northwestern Central Java and anti-bandit operations in the Mount Merapi area. He also sought to stem leftist sympathies among his troops. His experience in this period left Suharto with a deep distaste for both Islamic and communist radicalism.

Between 1956 and 1959, he served in the important position of commander of Diponegoro Division based in Semarang, responsible for Central Java and Yogyakarta provinces. His relationship with prominent businessmen Liem Sioe Liong and Bob Hasan, which extended throughout his presidency, began in Central Java, where he was involved in a series of "profit-generating" enterprises conducted primarily to keep the poorly funded military unit functioning. Army anti-corruption investigations implicated Suharto in a 1959 smuggling scandal. Relieved of his position, he was transferred to the army's Staff and Command School (Seskoad) in the city of Bandung.

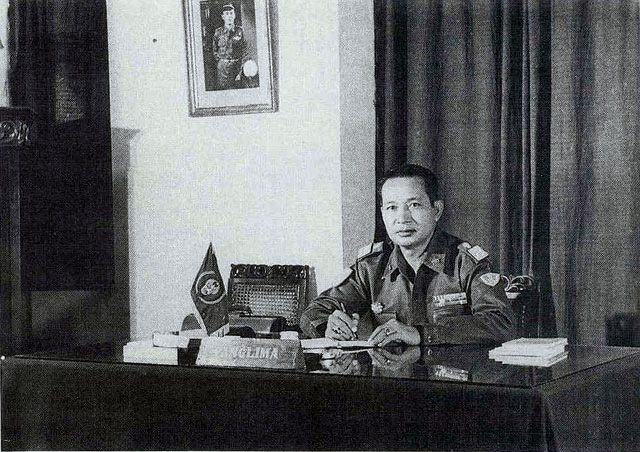
In his office as the head of the Strategic Reserve, c. 1963

While in Bandung, he was promoted to brigadier-general, and in late 1960, promoted to army deputy chief of staff. On 6 March 1961, he was given an additional command, as head of the army's new Strategic Reserve (Korps Tentara I Cadangan Umum AD, later Kostrad), a ready-reaction air-mobile force based in Jakarta. In January 1962, Suharto was promoted to the rank of major general and appointed to lead Operation Mandala, a joint army-navy-air force command based in Makassar. This formed the military side of the campaign to win western New Guinea from the Dutch, who were preparing it for its own independence, separate from Indonesia. In 1965, Suharto was assigned operational command of Sukarno's Konfrontasi, against the newly formed Malaysia. Fearful that the Konfrontasi would leave Java thinly covered by the army and hand control to the 2 million-strong Indonesian Communist Party (PKI), he authorised a Kostrad intelligence officer, Ali Murtopo, to open secret contacts with the British and Malaysians.

== Rise to power ==
=== Background ===
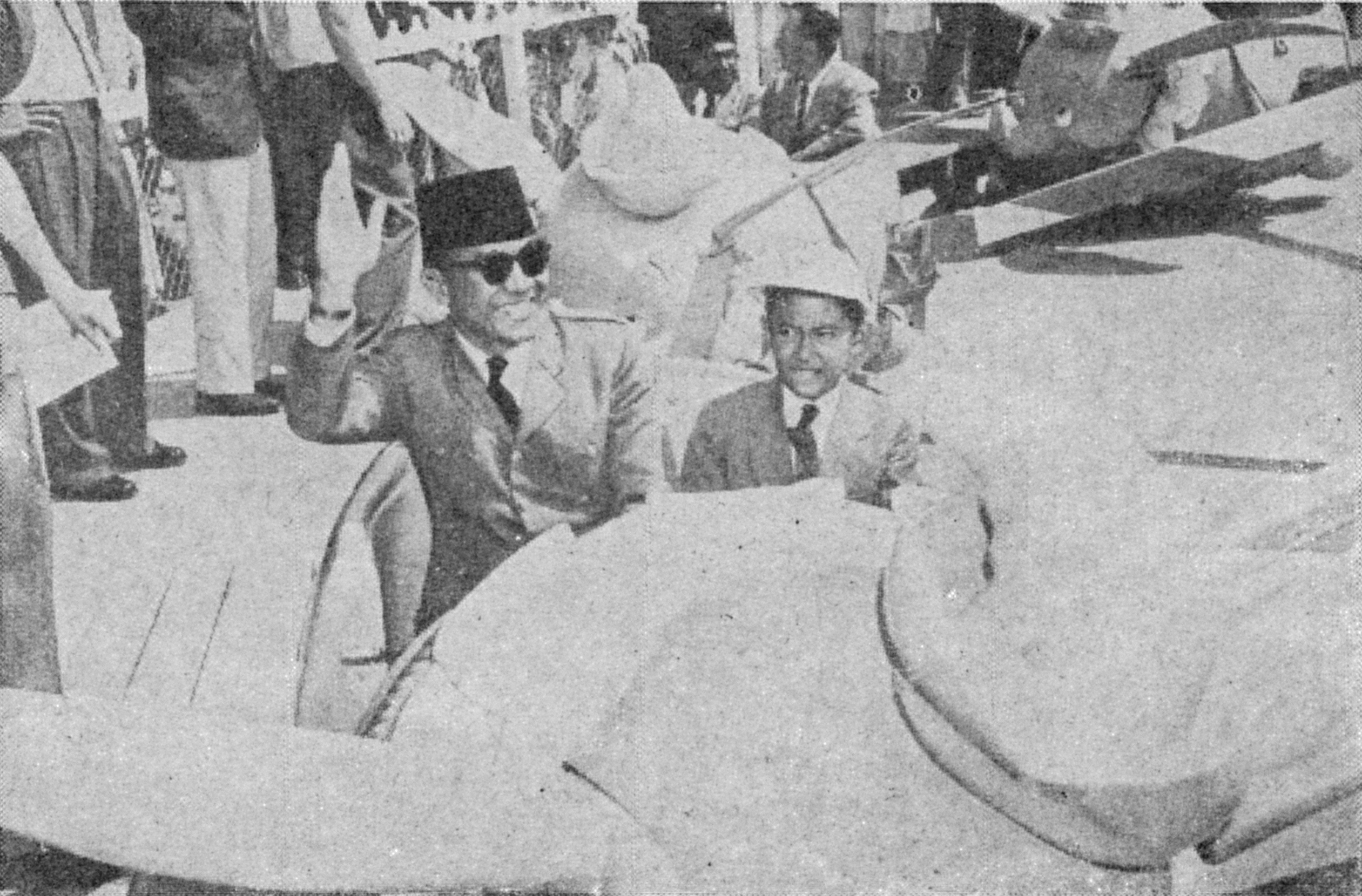
President Sukarno (with glasses) in Disneyland, c. 1961

Tensions between the military and communists increased in April 1965, when Sukarno endorsed the immediate implementation of the PKI's proposal for a "fifth armed force" consisting of armed peasants and workers. However, this idea was rejected by the army's leadership as being tantamount to the PKI establishing its own armed forces. In May, the "Gilchrist Document" aroused Sukarno's fear of a military plot to overthrow him, a fear which he repeatedly mentioned during the next few months. On his independence day speech in August, Sukarno declared his intention to commit Indonesia to an anti-imperialist alliance with China and other communist countries and warned the army not to interfere.

While Sukarno devoted his energy to domestic and international politics, the economy of Indonesia deteriorated rapidly with worsening widespread poverty and hunger, while foreign debt obligations became unmanageable and infrastructure crumbled. Sukarno's Guided Democracy stood on fragile grounds due to the inherent conflict between its two underlying support pillars, the military and the communists. The military, nationalists, and the Islamic groups were shocked by the rapid growth of the communist party under Sukarno's protection. They feared the imminent establishment of a communist state in Indonesia. By 1965, the PKI had three million members and was particularly strong in Central Java and Bali. The party had become the most potent political party in Indonesia.

=== Abortive coup and anti-communist purge ===
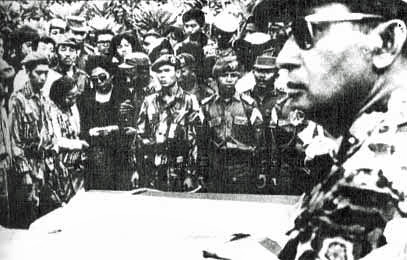
Major General Suharto (at right, in the foreground) attending the funeral for the assassinated generals, 5 October 1965

Before dawn on 1 October 1965, six army generals were kidnapped and executed in Jakarta by soldiers from the Presidential Guard, Diponegoro Division, and Brawidjaja Division. Soldiers occupied Merdeka Square including the areas in front of the Presidential Palace, the national radio station, and telecommunications centre. At 7:10 am Untung bin Syamsuri announced on the radio that the "30 September Movement" had forestalled a coup attempt on Sukarno by "CIA-backed power-mad generals", and that it was "an internal army affair". The movement never made any attempt on Suharto's life. Suharto had been in Jakarta army hospital that evening with his three-year-old son Tommy who had a scalding injury. It was here that he was visited by Colonel Abdul Latief, a key member of the Movement and close family friend of Suharto. According to Latief's later testimony, the conspirators assumed Suharto to be a Sukarno-loyalist; hence Latief went to inform him of the impending kidnapping plan to save Sukarno from treacherous generals, upon which Suharto seemed to offer his neutrality.

Upon being told of the killings, Suharto went to Kostrad headquarters just before dawn from where he could see soldiers occupying Merdeka Square. He mobilised Kostrad and RPKAD (now Kopassus) special forces to seize control of the centre of Jakarta, capturing key strategic sites including the radio station without resistance. Suharto announced over the radio at 9:00 pm that six generals had been kidnapped by "counter-revolutionaries" and that the 30 September Movement actually intended to overthrow Sukarno. He said he was in control of the army, and that he would crush the Movement and safeguard Sukarno. Suharto issued an ultimatum to Halim Air Force Base, where the G30S had based themselves and where Sukarno, air force commander Omar Dhani and PKI chairman Dipa Nusantara Aidit had gathered, causing them to disperse before Suhartoist soldiers occupied the airbase on 2 October after short fighting. With the failure of the poorly organized coup, and having secured authority from the president to restore order and security, Suharto's faction was firmly in control of the army by 2 October (he was officially appointed army commander on 14 October). On 5 October, Suharto led a dramatic public ceremony to bury the generals' bodies.

Complicated and partisan theories continue to this day over the identity of the attempted coup's organizers and their aims. The army's version, and subsequently that of the "New Order", was that the PKI was solely responsible. A propaganda campaign by the army and Islamic and Catholic student groups convinced both Indonesian and international audiences that it was a communist coup attempt, and that the killings were cowardly atrocities against Indonesian heroes. The army in alliance with civilian religious groups, and backed by the United States and other Western powers, led a campaign of mass killings to purge Indonesian society, government, and armed forces of the Communist Party of Indonesia and other leftist organizations. The purge spread from Jakarta to much of the rest of the country. The most widely accepted estimates are that at least 500,000 to over 1 million were killed. As many as 1.5 million were imprisoned at one stage or another. As a result of the purge, one of Sukarno's three pillars of support, the Indonesian Communist Party, was effectively eliminated by the other two, the military and political Islam. The CIA described the purge as "one of the worst mass murders of the 20th century."

=== Power struggle ===
Sukarno continued to command loyalty from large sections of the armed forces as well as the general population, and Suharto was careful not to be seen to be seizing power in his own coup. For eighteen months following the quashing of the 30 September Movement, there was a complicated process of political manoeuvres against Sukarno, including student agitation, stacking of parliament, media propaganda and military threats. In January 1966, university students under the banner of KAMI, began demonstrations against the Sukarno government voicing demands for the disbandment of the PKI and control of hyperinflation. The students received support and protection from the army. Street fights broke out between the students and pro-Sukarno loyalists with the pro-Suharto students prevailing due to army protection.

In February 1966, Sukarno promoted Suharto to lieutenant-general (and to full general in July 1966). The killing of a student demonstrator and Sukarno's order for the disbandment of KAMI in February 1966 further galvanised public opinion against the president. On 11 March 1966, the appearance of unidentified troops around Merdeka Palace during a cabinet meeting (which Suharto had not attended) forced Sukarno to flee to Bogor Palace (60 km away) by helicopter. Three pro-Suharto generals, Major General Basuki Rahmat, Brigadier General M. Jusuf, and Brigadier General Amir Machmud went to Bogor to meet Sukarno. There, they persuaded and secured a presidential decree from Sukarno (see Supersemar) that gave Suharto authority to take any action necessary to maintain security. Using the Supersemar letter, Suharto ordered the banning of the PKI the following day and proceeded to purge pro-Sukarno elements from the parliament, the government and military, accusing them of being communist sympathisers.

The army arrested 15 cabinet ministers and forced Sukarno to appoint a new cabinet consisting of Suharto supporters. The army arrested pro-Sukarno and pro-communist members of the MPRS (parliament), and Suharto replaced chiefs of the navy, air force, and the police force with his supporters, who then began an extensive purge within each service. In June 1966, the now-purged parliament passed 24 resolutions including the banning of Marxism–Leninism, ratifying the Supersemar, and stripping Sukarno of his title of President for Life. Crucially, it also resolved that if Sukarno were unable to carry out his duties, the holder of the Supersemar—Suharto—would become acting president. Against the wishes of Sukarno, the government ended the Konfrontasi with Malaysia and rejoined the United Nations (Sukarno had removed Indonesia from the UN in the previous year). Suharto did not seek Sukarno's outright removal at this MPRS session due to the remaining support for the president among some elements of the armed forces. By January 1967, Suharto felt confident that he had removed all significant support for Sukarno within the armed forces. After Sukarno gave his version of events, the MPRS concluded that he had been derelict in his duties and decided to hold another session to impeach him. On 20 February 1967, facing an increasingly untenable situation, Sukarno announced he would resign from the presidency. Later, the MPRS session stripped him of his remaining power on 12 March and named Suharto acting president. Sukarno was placed under house arrest in Bogor Palace; little more was heard from him, and he died in June 1970. On 27 March 1968, the MPRS elected Suharto for a full five-year term as president.

== New Order (1967–1998) ==
=== Political ideology ===
- Presidency of Suharto; 12 March 1967 – 21 May 1998
- Cabinet: Ampera Cabinet; Revised Ampera Cabinet; First Development Cabinet; Second Development Cabinet; Third Development Cabinet; Fourth Development Cabinet; Fifth Development Cabinet; Sixth Development Cabinet; Seventh Development Cabinet
- Party: Military; Golkar
- Election: 1971; 1977; 1982; 1987; 1992; 1997
- Seat: Istana Negara
- Seal of the President of Indonesia

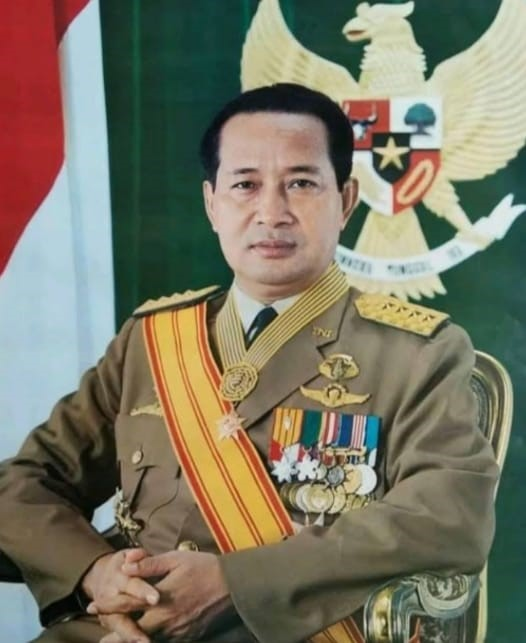
Official portrait, 1967

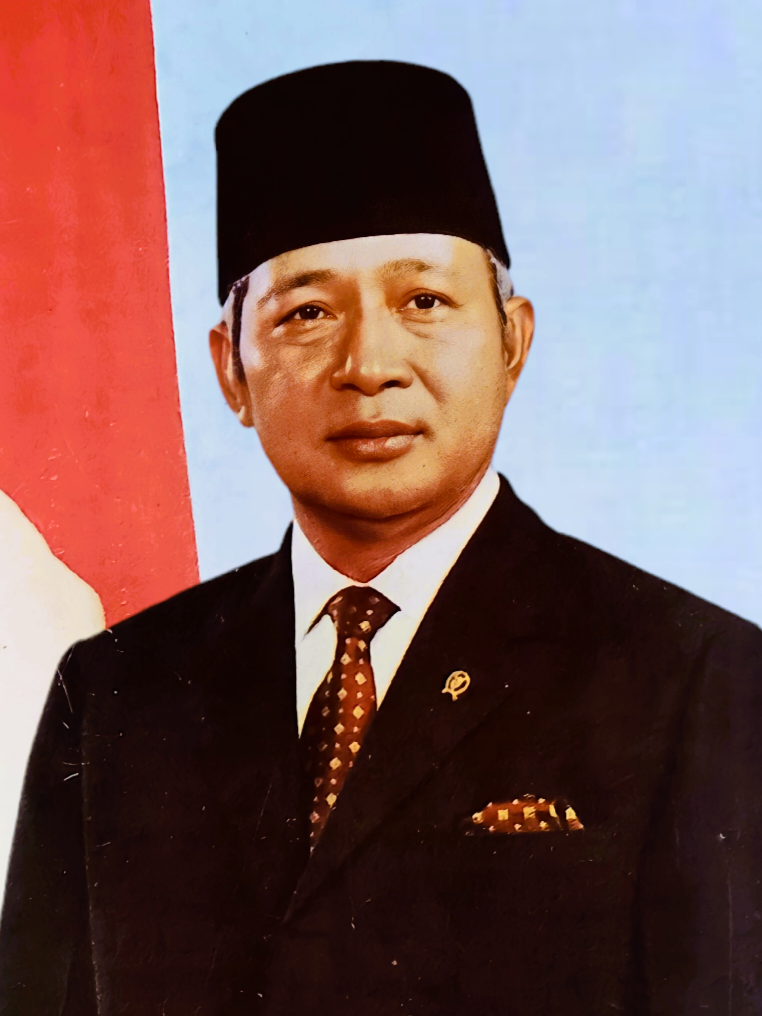
Official portrait, 1978

Suharto promoted his "New Order", as opposed to Sukarno's "Old Order", as a society based on the Pancasila ideology. After initially being careful not to offend sensitivities of Islamic scholars who feared Pancasila might develop into a quasi-religious cult, Suharto secured a parliamentary resolution in 1983 which obliged all organizations in Indonesia to adhere to Pancasila as a fundamental principle. He also instituted mandatory Pancasila training programs for all Indonesians, from primary school students to office workers. In practice, however, the vagueness of Pancasila was exploited by Suharto's government to justify their actions and to condemn their opponents as "anti-Pancasila." The New Order also implemented the Dwifungsi ("Dual Function") policy which enabled the military to have an active role in all levels of the Indonesian government, economy, and society.

=== Economic policy ===
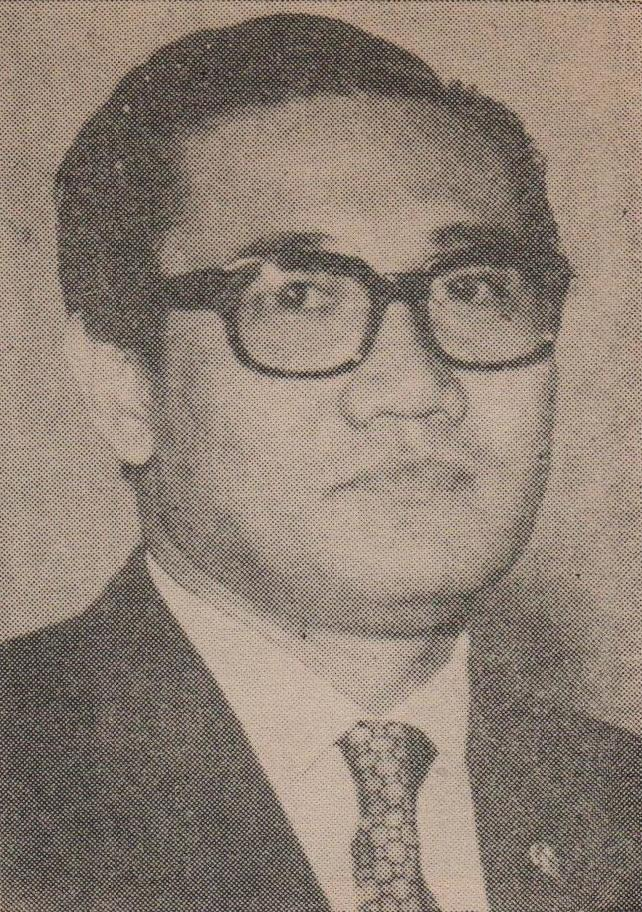
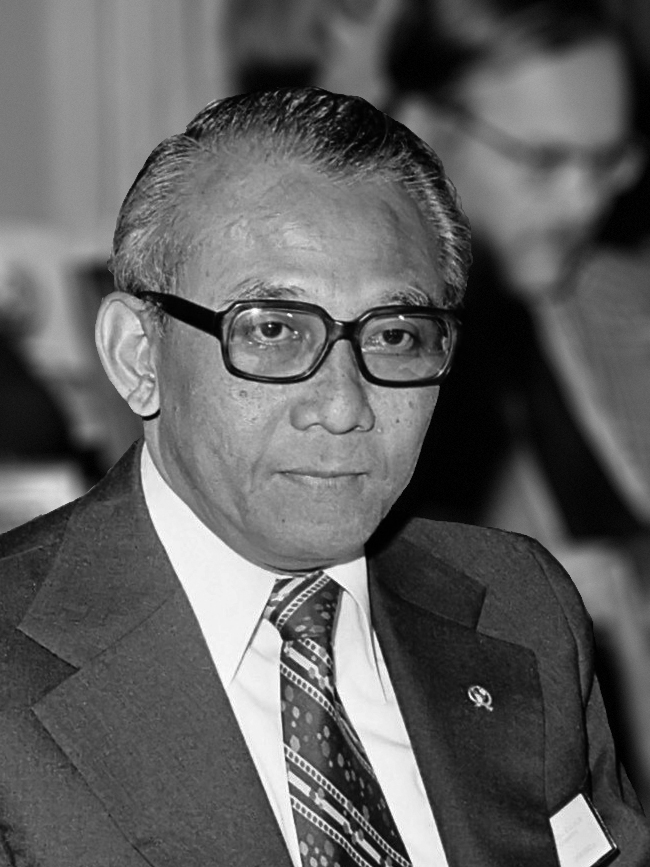
Ali Wardhana (left) and Widjojo Nitisastro (right), both members of the "Berkeley Mafia"

Until the mid-1960s, Indonesia was known as the poorest country in Asia and amongst the poorest in the world. When Suharto came to power, inflation reached 650% per year. Suharto understood that if he wanted to defeat communism, he had to beat poverty. To stabilise the economy, he appointed an economic advisory group consisting of mostly US-educated intellectuals from the Economic Faculty of the University of Indonesia, dubbed the "Berkeley Mafia", to formulate significant changes in economic policy. Amongst the members of the economic group were Widjojo Nitisastro, Ali Wardhana and Emil Salim. The group implemented free market policies; a complete reversal from Sukarno's policies which tightly regulated manufacturing and trade. In addition, by cutting subsidies, decreasing government debt, and reforming the exchange rate mechanism, inflation was lowered from 660% in 1966 to 19% in 1969. With the economic group, Suharto was not an autocratic leader. He was willing to learn and rarely imposed his will on the team. The threat of famine was alleviated by the influx of USAID rice aid shipments from 1967 to 1968.

With a lack of domestic capital that was required for economic growth, the New Order reversed Sukarno's economic self-sufficiency policies and opened selected economic sectors of the country to foreign investment through the 1967 Foreign Investment Law. Suharto travelled to Western Europe and Japan to promote investment in Indonesia. The first foreign investors to re-enter Indonesia included mining companies Freeport Sulphur Company / International Nickel Company. Following government regulatory frameworks, domestic entrepreneurs (mostly Chinese-Indonesians) emerged in the late 1960s and early 1970s in the import-substitution light-manufacturing sector such as Astra Group and Salim Group.

From 1967, the government secured low-interest foreign aid from ten countries grouped under the Inter-Governmental Group on Indonesia (IGGI) to cover its budget deficit. With the IGGI funds and the later jump in oil export revenue from the 1973 oil crisis, the government invested in infrastructure under a series of five-year plans, dubbed REPELITA (Rencana Pembangunan Lima Tahun) I to VI from 1969 to 1998.

=== Consolidation of power ===
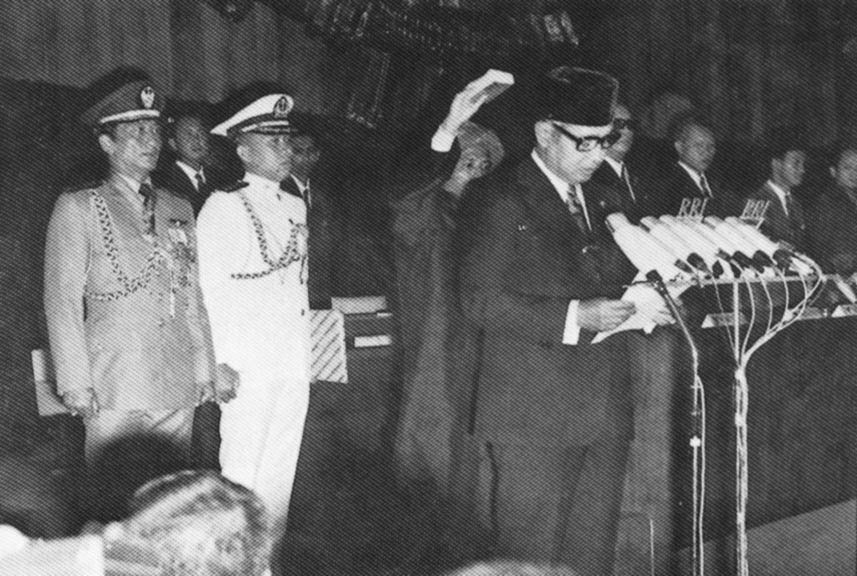
Suharto taking the presidential oath of office, 27 March 1968

Having been appointed president, Suharto still needed to share power with various elements including Indonesian generals who considered Suharto as mere primus inter pares, and Islamic and student groups who participated in the anti-communist purge. Suharto, aided by his "Office of Personal Assistants" (Aspri) clique of military officers from his days as commander of Diponegoro Division, particularly Ali Murtopo, began to systematically cement his hold on power by subtly sidelining potential rivals while rewarding loyalists with political position and monetary incentives. Having successfully stood-down MPRS chairman General Abdul Haris Nasution's 1968 attempt to introduce a bill which would have severely curtailed presidential authority, Suharto had him removed from his position as MPRS chairman in 1969 and forced his early retirement from the military in 1972. In 1967, generals Hartono Rekso Dharsono, Kemal Idris, and Sarwo Edhie Wibowo (dubbed "New Order radicals") opposed Suharto's decision to allow participation of existing political parties in elections in favour of a non-ideological two-party system similar to those found in many Western countries. Suharto sent Dharsono overseas as an ambassador, while Idris and Wibowo were sent to distant North Sumatra and South Sulawesi as regional commanders.

=== Domestic policy and political stability ===
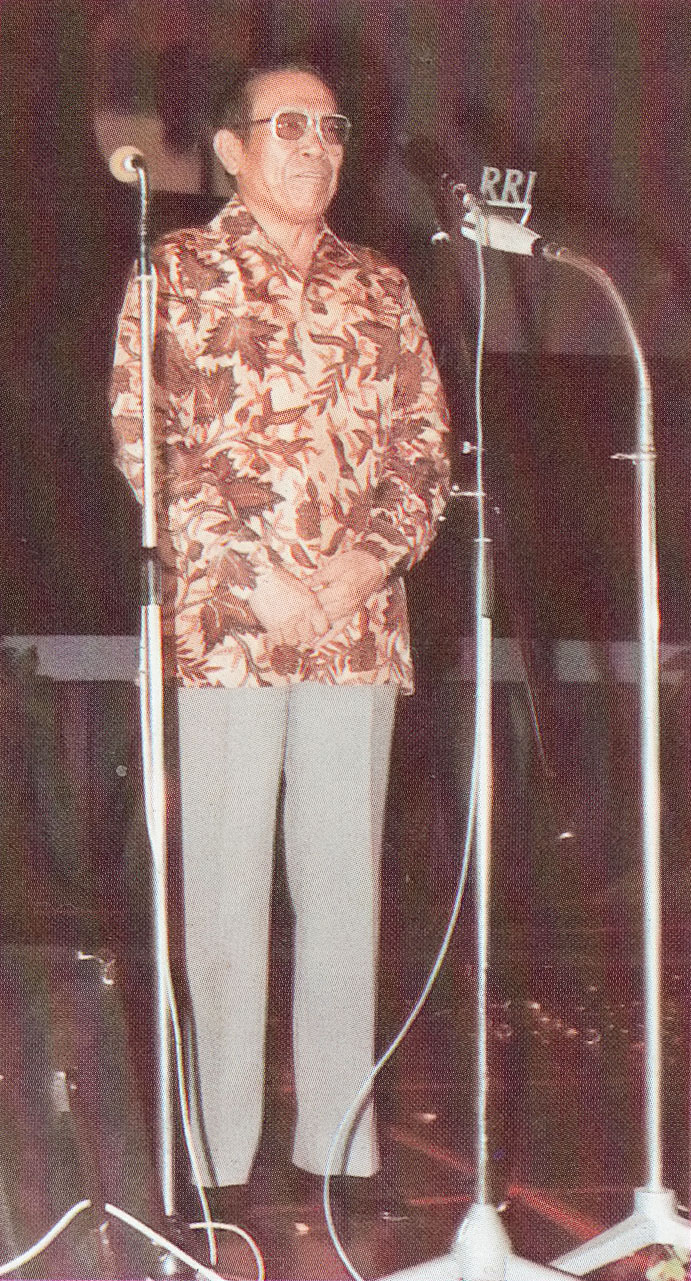
Suharto's right-hand man Ali Murtopo, c. 1982

To placate demands from civilian politicians for the holding of elections, as manifested in MPRS resolutions of 1966 and 1967, Suharto government formulated a series of laws regarding elections as well as the structure and duties of parliament which were passed by MPRS in November 1969 after protracted negotiations. The law provided for a parliament (Madjelis Permusjawaratan Rakjat, MPR) with the power to elect presidents, consisting of the House of Representatives (Dewan Perwakilan Rakjat, DPR) and regional representatives. 100 of the 460 members of DPR would be directly appointed by the government, while the remaining seats were allocated to political organizations based on results of the general election. This mechanism ensures significant government control over legislative affairs, particularly the appointment of presidents.

To participate in the elections, Suharto realised the need to align himself with a political party. After initially considering alignment with Sukarno's old party, the PNI, in 1969 Suharto decided to take over control of an obscure military-run federation of NGOs called Golkar ("Functional Groups") and transform it into his electoral vehicle under the coordination of his right-hand man Ali Murtopo. The first general election was held on 3 July 1971 with ten participants; consisting of Golkar, four Islamic parties, as well as five nationalist and Christian parties. Campaigning on a non-ideological platform of "development", and aided by official government support and subtle intimidation tactics, Golkar managed to secure 62.8% of the popular vote. The March 1973 general session of newly elected MPR promptly elected Suharto to a second-term in office, with Sultan Hamengkubuwono IX as his vice president.

"It is not the military strength of the Communists, but their fanaticism and ideology which is the principal element of their strength. To consider this, each country in the area needs an ideology of its own with which to counter the Communists. But a national ideology is not enough by itself. The well being of the people must be improved so that it strengthens and supports the national ideology."

— Suharto speaking to President Ford in 1975

On 5 January 1973, to allow better control, the government forced the four Islamic parties to merge into PPP (Partai Persatuan Pembangunan, United Development Party) while the five non-Islamic parties were fused into PDI (Partai Demokrasi Indonesia, Indonesian Democratic Party). The government ensured that these parties never developed effective opposition by controlling their leadership while establishing the "re-call" system to remove any outspoken legislators from their positions. Using this system, dubbed "Pancasila Democracy", Suharto was re-elected unopposed by the MPR in 1978, 1983, 1988, 1993, and 1998. Golkar won landslide majorities in the MPR at every election. Combined with the bloc of military representatives in the DPR, Suharto was able to pass his agenda with no substantive opposition.

Suharto took great care to make it appear that his regime appeared to observe the tenets of the constitution. On paper, the president was the "mandatory of the MPR", responsible for implementing the "Broad Lines of State Policy" (GBHN) developed by the MPR. Near the end of each of his terms, Suharto delivered "accountability speeches" to the MPR that outlined the achievements of his administration and demonstrated how he had adhered to the GBHN. Additionally, the president had the power to issue regulations in lieu of law, but such regulations had to be approved by the House of People's Representatives (DPR) to remain in effect. In practice, however, his supermajority in the DPR and MPR made such approval a mere formality. Combined with the DPR's infrequent sessions (it usually sat for only one session per year), Suharto was able to effectively rule by decree for most of his tenure. However, the Golkar/military bloc's support was large enough to turn the MPR and DPR into rubber stamps for his policies.

Suharto also proceeded with various social engineering projects designed to transform Indonesian society into a de-politicised "floating mass" supportive of the national mission of "development", a concept similar to corporatism. The government formed various civil society groups to unite the populace in support of government programs. For instance, the government created the KORPRI (Korps Pegawai Republik Indonesia) in November 1971 as union of civil servants to ensure their loyalty, organized the FBSI (Federasi Buruh Seluruh Indonesia) as the only legal labour union in February 1973, and established the MUI in 1975 to control Islamic clerics.

=== Social policy and programs ===
When the Indonesian government launched its family planning program (Keluarga Berencana/KB) in the early 1970s, Suharto and his wife travelled around the country to promote the benefits of family planning. The program, administrated by Badan Koordinasi Keluarga Berencana Nasional (the Family Planning Co-ordinating Board), combined outreach methods, education, and expanded access to several methods of birth control. Suharto not only provided the program with funding, but also moral support.

A lasting legacy from this period is the spelling reform of Indonesian language decreed by Suharto on 17 August 1972.

Suharto government's health-care programs (such as the Puskesmas program) increased life expectancy from 47 years (1966) to 67 years (1997) while cutting infant mortality rate by more than 60%. The government's Inpres program launched in 1973 resulted in primary school enrolment ratio reaching 90% by 1983 while almost eliminating the education gap between boys and girls. Sustained support for agriculture resulted in Indonesia achieving rice self-sufficiency by 1984, an unprecedented achievement which earned Suharto a gold medal from the Food and Agriculture Organization of the United Nations (FAO) in November 1985.

=== Internal security ===
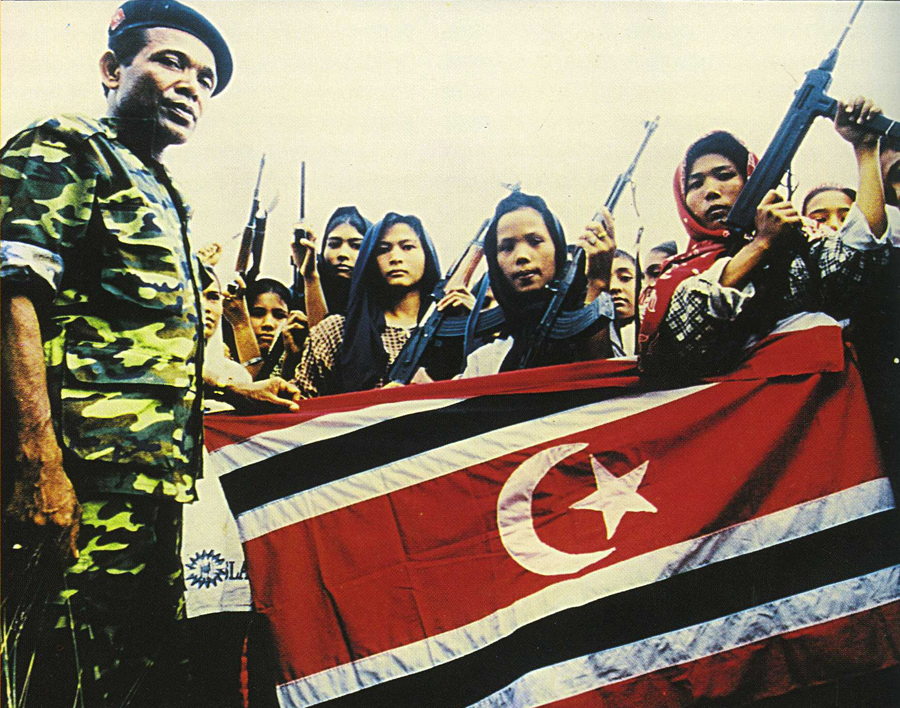
Women soldiers of the Free Aceh Movement, c. 1999

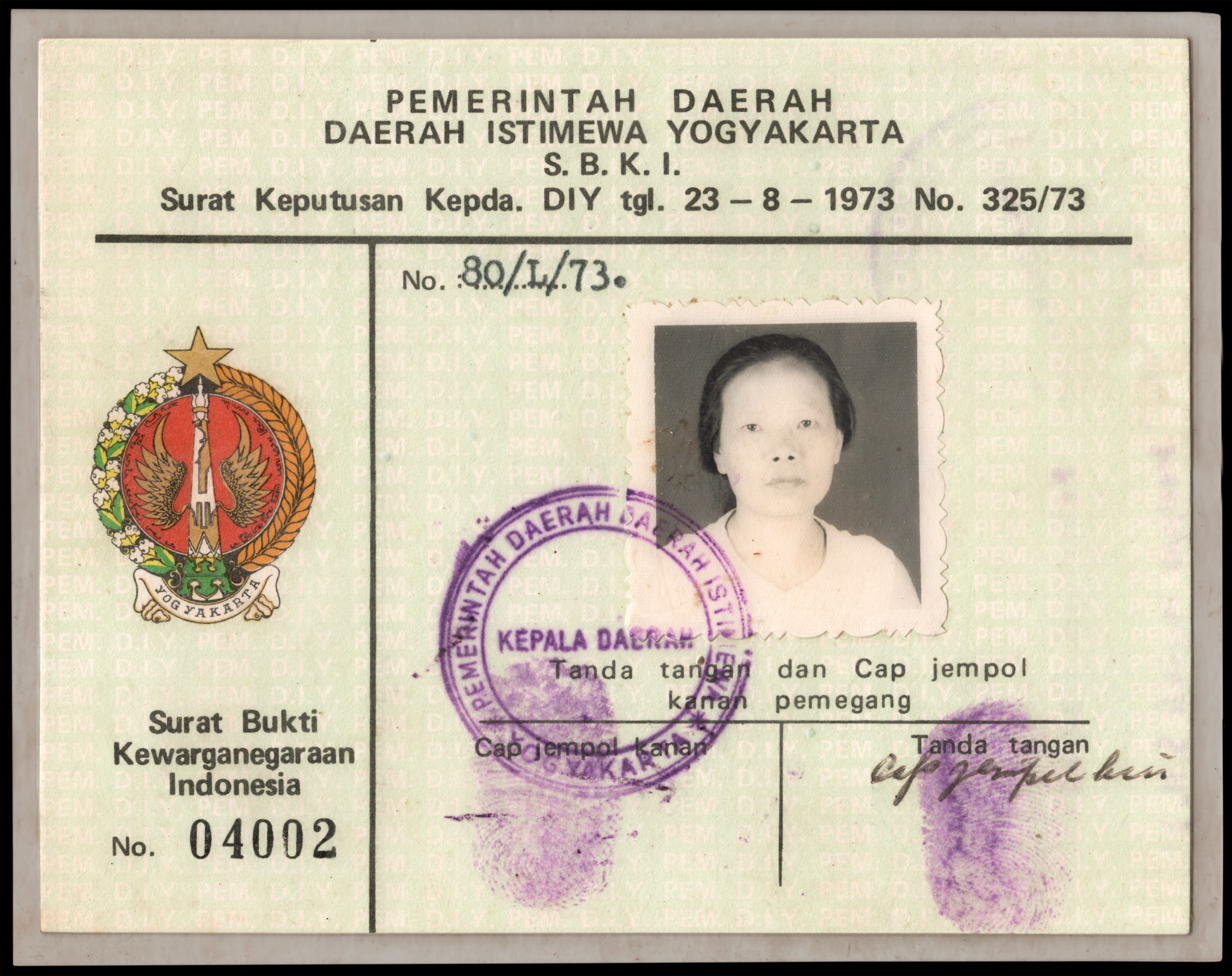
SBKRI from 1973, showing the portrait, fingerprints, and signature of the holder on the obverse

Additionally, Suharto relied on the military to ruthlessly maintain domestic security, organized by the Kopkamtib (Operation Command for the Restoration of Security and Order) and BAKIN (State Intelligence Coordination Agency). To maintain strict control over the country, Suharto expanded the army's territorial system down to village-level, while military officers were appointed as regional heads under the rubric of the Dwifungsi ("Dual Function") of the military. By 1969, 70% of Indonesia's provincial governors and more than half of its district chiefs were active military officers. Suharto authorised Operasi Trisula which destroyed PKI remnants trying to organize a guerrilla base in the Blitar area in 1968 and ordered several military operations that ended the communist PGRS-Paraku insurgency in West Kalimantan (1967–1972). Attacks on oil workers by the first incarnation of Free Aceh Movement separatists under Hasan di Tiro in 1977 led to the dispatch of small special forces detachments who quickly either killed or forced the movement's members to flee abroad. Notably, in March 1981, Suharto authorised a successful special forces mission to end hijacking of a Garuda Indonesia flight by Islamic extremists at Don Mueang International Airport in Bangkok.

To promote assimilation of the influential Chinese-Indonesians, the Suharto government passed several laws as part of the so-called "Basic Policy for the Solution of Chinese Problem", whereby only one Chinese-language publication (controlled by the Army) was allowed to continue, all Chinese cultural and religious expressions (including the display of Chinese characters) were prohibited from public space, Chinese schools were seized and turned into Indonesian-language public schools, and the ethnic-Chinese were forced to take-up Indonesian-sounding names; creating a systematic cultural genocide. In 1978, the government began requiring a Letter of Proof of Citizenship of the Republic of Indonesia (Indonesian: Surat Bukti Kewarganegaraan Republik Indonesia, or SBKRI). Although the SBKRI was legally required for all citizens of foreign descent, in practice it was generally applied only to Chinese descent. This led to difficulties for Chinese Indonesians when enrolling in state universities, applying to be civil servants, or joining the military or police.

=== Foreign policy ===
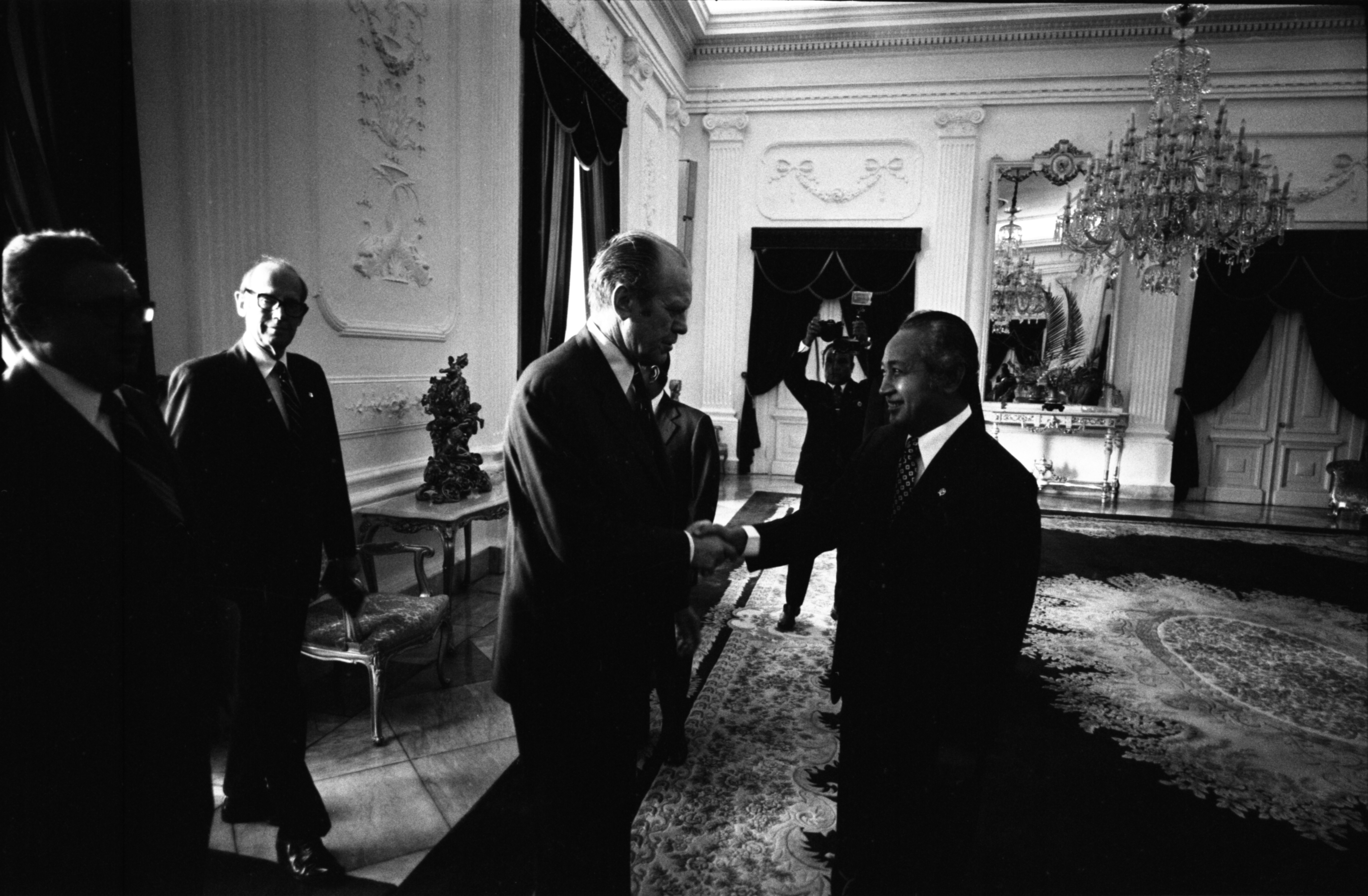
Suharto with US president Gerald Ford and Secretary of State Henry Kissinger in Jakarta on 6 December 1975

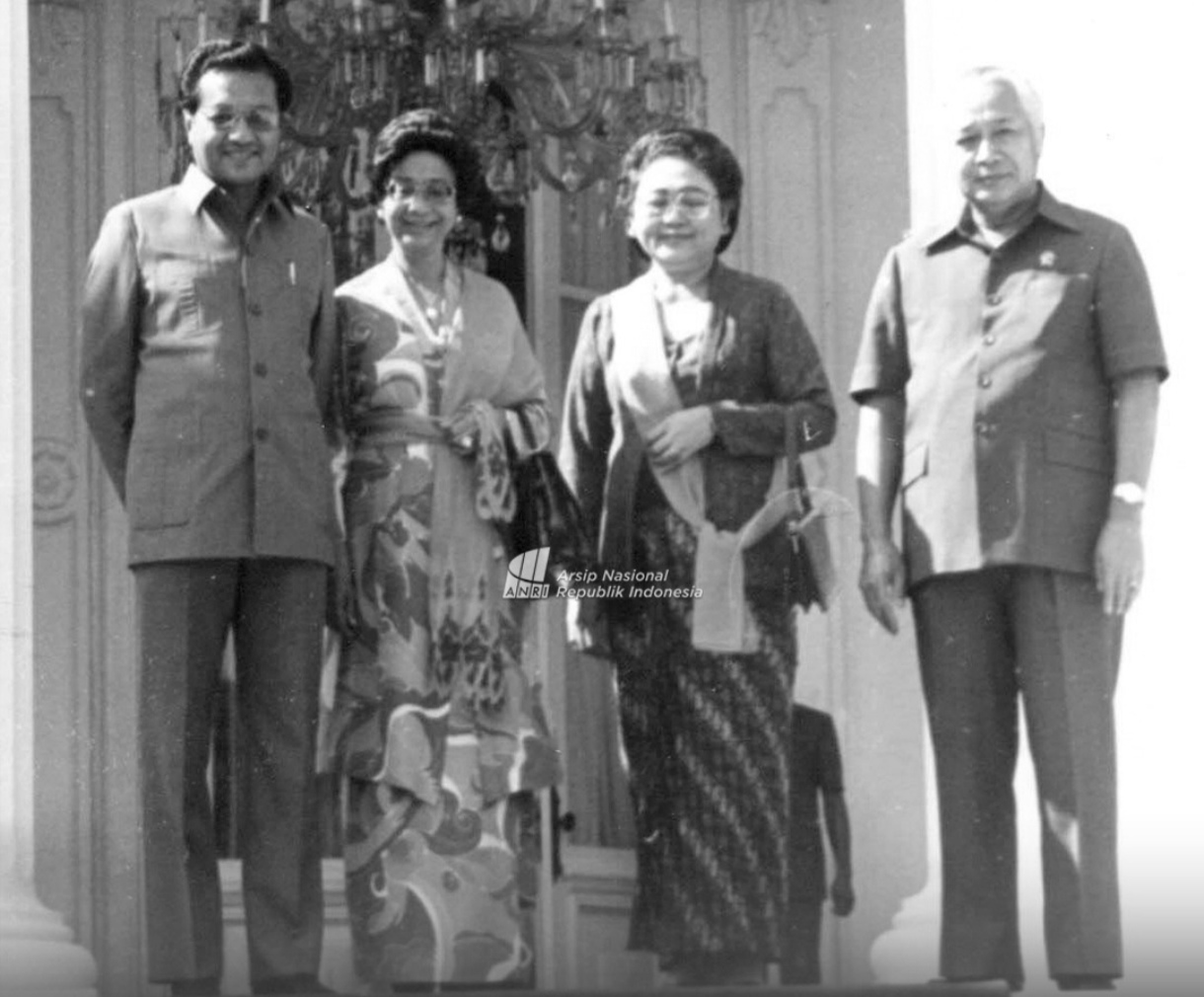
Suharto and his wife, Siti Hartinah, welcoming Malaysian prime minister Mahathir Mohamad and his wife, Siti Hasmah, at Istana Negara on 16 March 1985

Upon assuming power, Suharto's government adopted a policy of neutrality in the Cold War but was nevertheless quietly aligned with the Western bloc (including Japan and South Korea) to secure support for Indonesia's economic recovery. Western countries, impressed by Suharto's strong anti-communist credentials, were quick to offer their support. Diplomatic relations with China were suspended in October 1967 due to suspicion of Chinese involvement in the 30 September Movement. (Diplomatic relations were not restored until 1990.) Due to Suharto's destruction of the PKI, the Soviet Union embargoed military sales to Indonesia. However, from 1967 to 1970 foreign minister Adam Malik managed to secure several agreements to restructure massive debts incurred by Sukarno from the Soviet Union and other Eastern European communist states. Regionally, having ended confrontation with Malaysia in August 1966, Indonesia became a founding member of the Association of Southeast Asian Nations (ASEAN) in August 1967. This organization is designed to establish a peaceful relationship between Southeast Asian countries free from conflicts such as the ongoing Vietnam War. Under Suharto, Indonesia maintained full diplomatic relations with North Vietnam and a special representation of the Viet Cong on its territory, but it also granted Chamber of Commerce status to South Vietnam in 1967. This restored South Vietnam's presence in Indonesia, which had severed consular relations in 1964. On 22 June 1970, South Vietnam established a permanent trade mission in Jakarta headed by Do Quang Nang, serving as a Consul General. He presented his credentials to Indonesian Foreign Minister Adam Malik on August 31.

==== East Timor ====
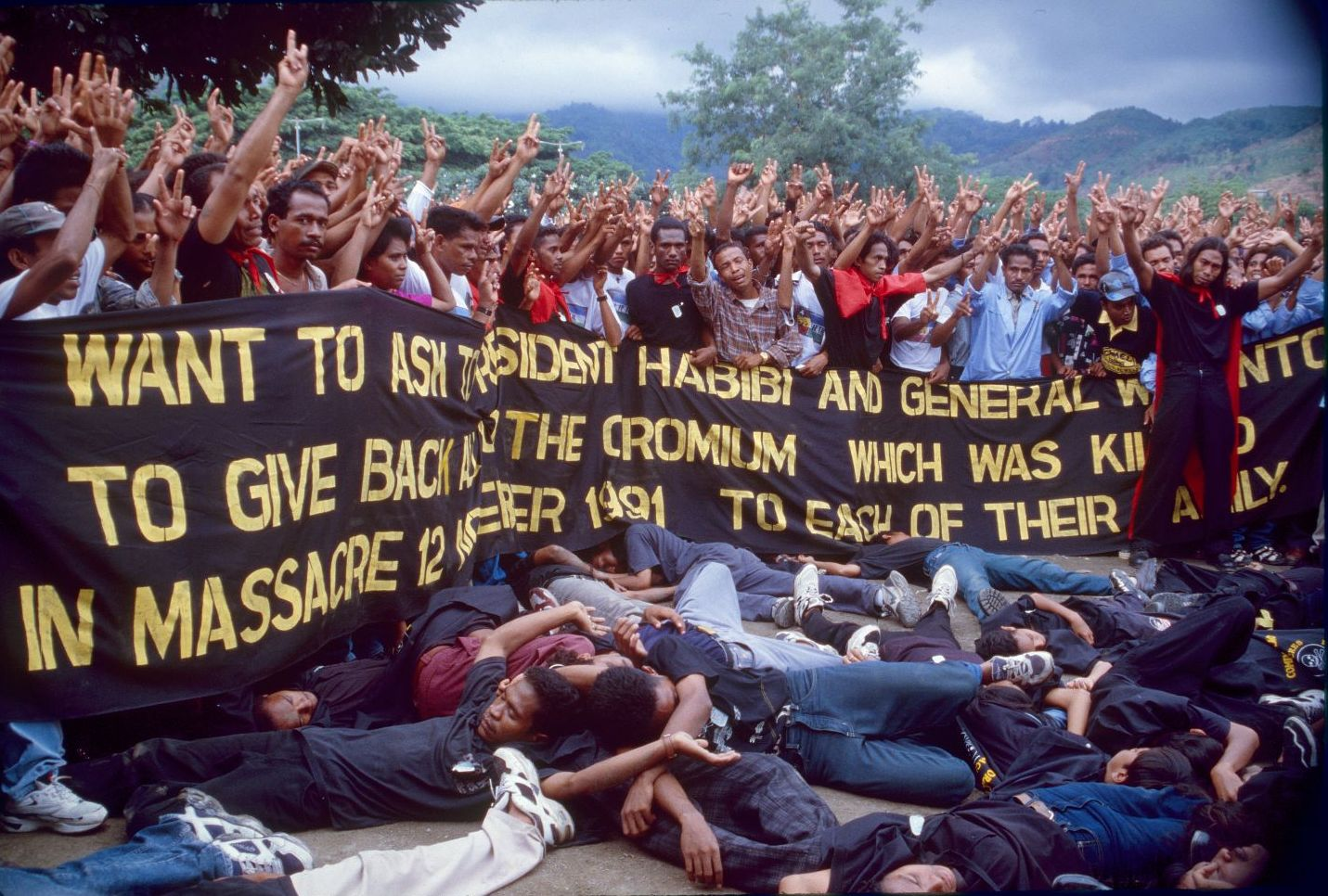
A re-enactment of the Santa Cruz massacre of at least 250 East Timorese pro-independence demonstrators during the Indonesian occupation of East Timor, c. 1998

In 1974, the neighbouring colony of Portuguese Timor descended into civil war after the withdrawal of Portuguese authority following the Carnation Revolution, whereby the left-wing populist Fretilin (Portuguese: Frente Revolucionária de Timor-Leste Independente) emerged triumphant. With approval from Western countries (including from U.S. president Gerald Ford and Australian prime minister Gough Whitlam during their visits to Indonesia), Suharto decided to intervene. He claimed the move was to prevent the establishment of a communist state. After an unsuccessful attempt of covert support to Timorese groups UDT and APODETI, Suharto authorised a full-scale invasion of the colony on 7 December 1975 followed with its official annexation as Indonesia's 27th province of East Timor in July 1976. The "encirclement and annihilation" campaigns of 1977–1979 broke the back of Fretilin control over the hinterlands, although continuing guerrilla resistance caused the government to maintain a strong military force in the half-island until 1999. An estimated minimum of 90,800 and maximum of 213,600 conflict-related deaths occurred in East Timor during Indonesian rule (1974–1999); namely, 17,600–19,600 killings and 73,200 to 194,000 'excess' deaths from hunger and illness; Indonesian forces were responsible for about 70% of the violent deaths.

Indonesia's invasion and occupation of East Timor during Suharto's presidency resulted in at least 100,000 deaths. To comply with the New York Agreement of 1962 which required a plebiscite on the integration of West Irian into Indonesia before the end of 1969, the Suharto government begin organizing for a so-called "Act of Free Choice" scheduled for July–August 1969. The government sent RPKAD special forces under Sarwo Edhie Wibowo which secured the surrender of several bands of former Dutch-organized militia (Papoea Vrijwilligers Korps / PVK) at large in the jungles since the Indonesian takeover in 1963 while sending Catholic volunteers under Jusuf Wanandi to distribute consumer goods to promote pro-Indonesian sentiments. In March 1969, it was agreed that the plebiscite would be channelled via 1,025 tribal chiefs, citing the logistical challenge and political ignorance of the population. Using the above strategy, the plebiscite produced a unanimous decision for integration with Indonesia, which was duly noted by the United Nations General Assembly in November 1969.

=== Socio-economic progress ===
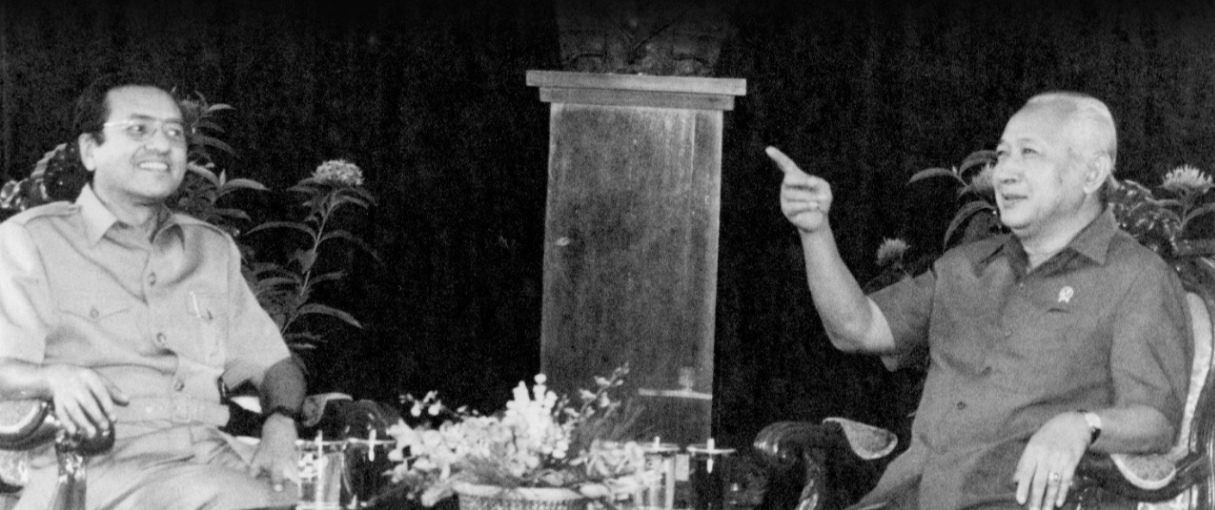
Suharto and Malaysian Prime Minister Mahathir Mohamad, 8 October 1985

Real socio-economic progress sustained support for Suharto's regime across three decades. By 1996, Indonesia's poverty rate had dropped to around 11% compared with 45% in 1970. From 1966 to 1997, Indonesia recorded real GDP growth of 5.03% pa, pushing real GDP per capita upwards from US$806 to US$4,114. In 1966, the manufacturing sector made up less than 10% of GDP (mostly industries related to oil and agriculture). By 1997, manufacturing had risen to 25% of GDP, and 53% of exports consisted of manufactured products. The government invested in massive infrastructure development (notably the launching of a series of Palapa telecommunication satellites); consequently, Indonesian infrastructure in the mid-1990s was considered at par with China. Suharto was keen to capitalize on such achievements to justify his presidency, and the parliament (MPR) on 9 March 1983 granted him the title of "Father of Development".

In the early 1980s, Suharto government responded to the fall in oil exports due to the 1980s oil glut by successfully shifting the basis of the economy to export-oriented labour-intensive manufacturing, made globally competitive by Indonesia's low wages and a series of currency devaluations. Industrialisation was mostly undertaken by Chinese-Indonesian companies which evolved into large conglomerates dominating the nation's economy.

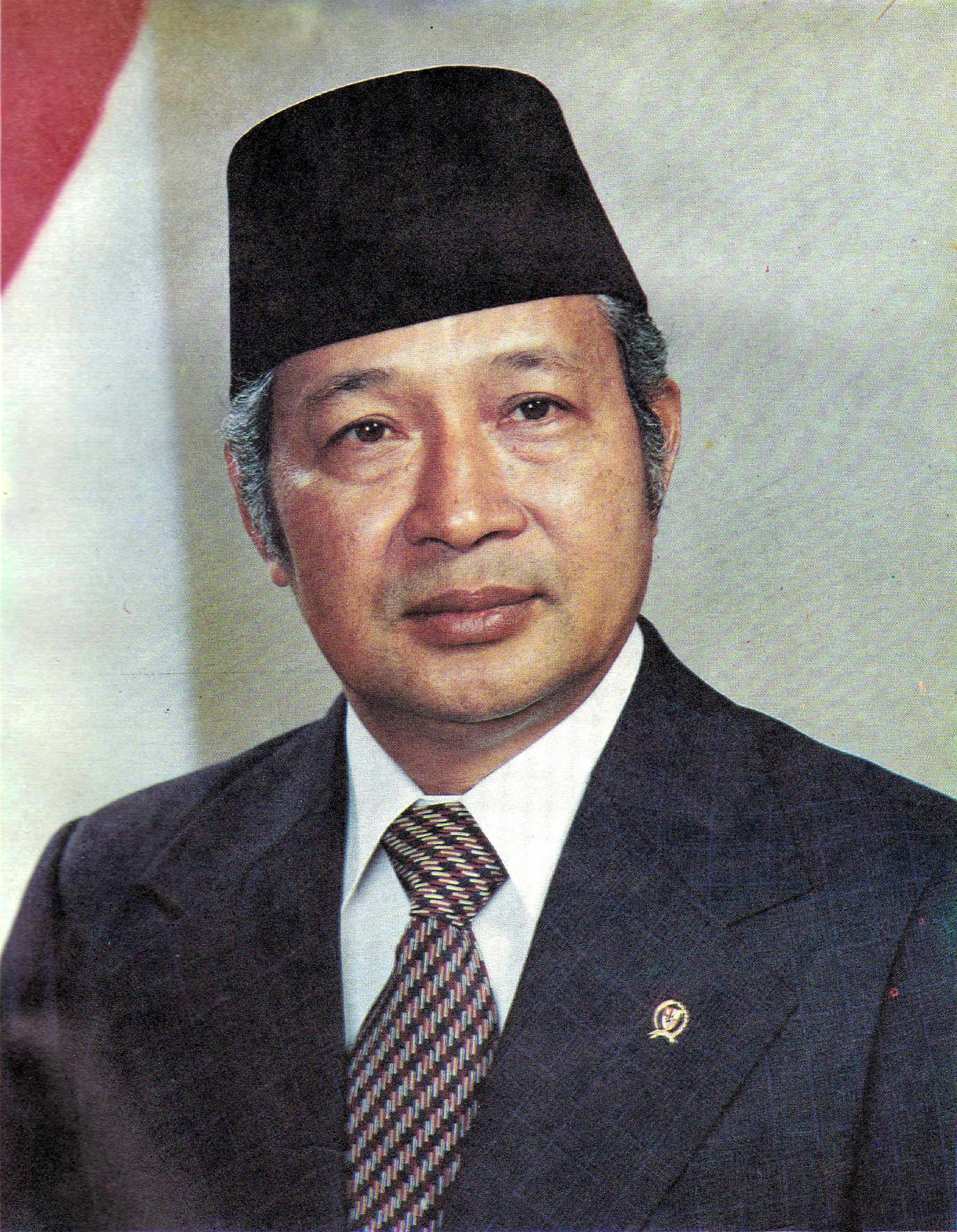
Official portrait, 1978

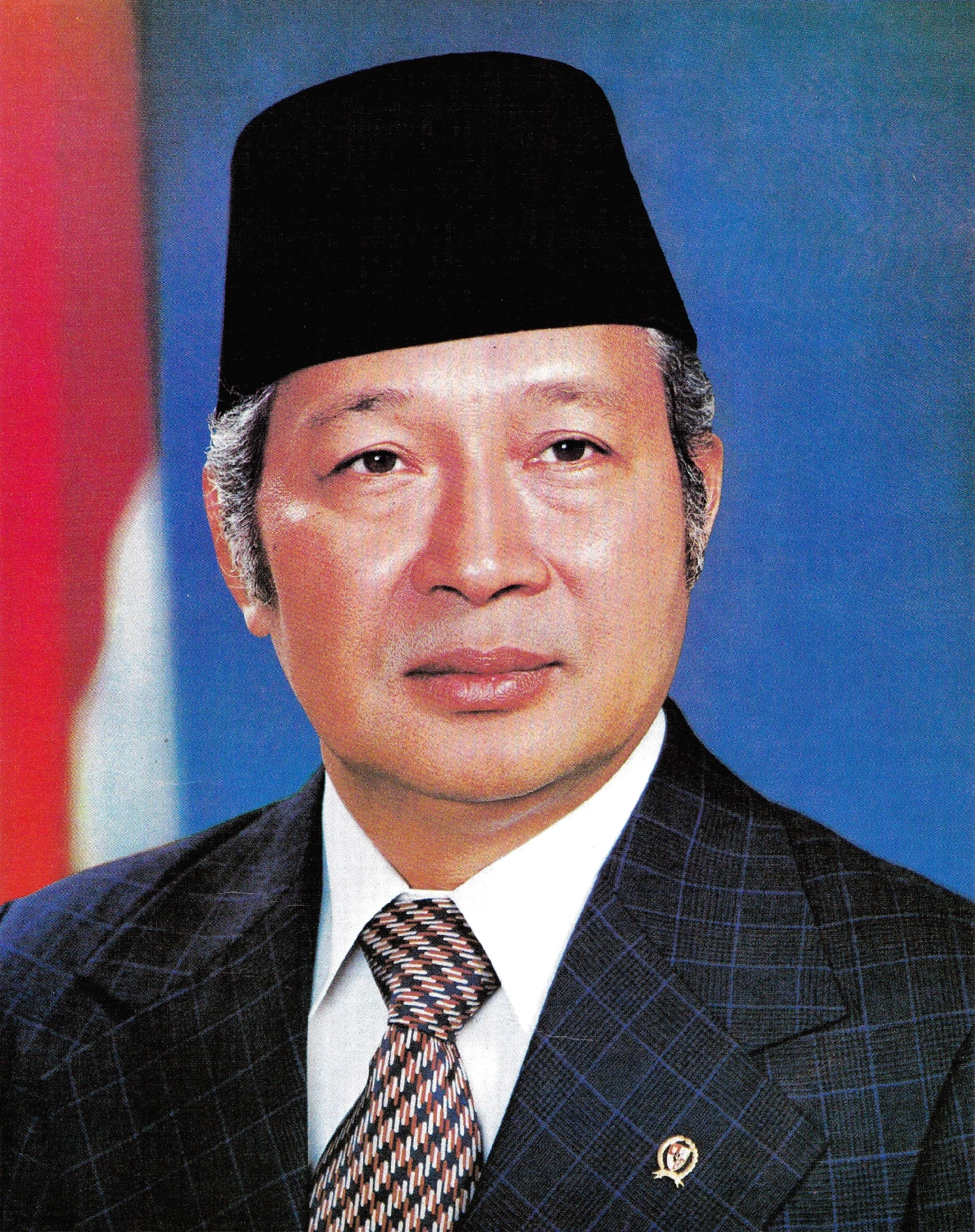
Official portrait, 1983

The largest of these conglomerates were the Salim Group led by Liem Sioe Liong (Sudono Salim), Sinar Mas Group led by Oei Ek Tjong (Eka Tjipta Widjaja), Astra Group led by Tjia Han Poen (William Soeryadjaya), Lippo Group led by Lie Mo Tie (Mochtar Riady), Barito Pacific Group led by Pang Djun Phen (Prajogo Pangestu), and Nusamba Group led by Bob Hasan. Suharto decided to support the growth of a small number of Chinese-Indonesian conglomerates since they would not pose a political challenge due to their ethnic-minority status, but from his experience, he deemed them to possess the skills and capital needed to create real growth for the country. In exchange for Suharto's patronage, the conglomerates provided vital financing for his "regime maintenance" activities.

In the late 1980s, the Suharto government decided to de-regulate the banking sector to encourage savings and providing a domestic source of financing required for growth. Suharto decreed the "October Package of 1988" (PAKTO 88) which eased requirements for establishing banks and extending credit; resulting in a 50% increase in the number of banks from 1989 to 1991. To promote savings, the government introduced the TABANAS program to the populace. The Jakarta Stock Exchange, re-opened in 1977, recorded a "bull run", due to a spree of domestic IPOs and an influx of foreign funds after the deregulation in 1990. The sudden availability of credit fuelled robust economic growth in the early 1990s, but the weak regulatory environment of the financial sector sowed the seeds of the catastrophic crisis in 1997, which eventually lead to the end of Suharto's presidency.

=== Scandals and controversies ===
==== Pertamina scandal ====
In 1975, the state-owned oil company, Pertamina, defaulted on its foreign loans as a result of mismanagement and corruption under the leadership of Suharto's close ally, Ibnu Sutowo. The government bail-out of the company nearly doubled the national debt.

==== Internal dissent ====
Suharto's previously strong relationship with the student movement soured over the increasing authoritarianism and corruption of his administration. While many original leaders of the 1966 student movement (Angkatan '66) were successfully co-opted into the regime, Suharto was faced with large student demonstrations challenging the legitimacy of 1971 elections (Golput movement), the costly construction of the Taman Mini Indonesia Indah theme park (1972), the domination of foreign capitalists (Malari Incident of 1974), and the lack of term limits of Suharto's presidency (1978). The regime responded by imprisoning many student activists (such as future national figures Dorodjatun Kuntjoro-Jakti, Adnan Buyung Nasution, Hariman Siregar, and Syahrir), and even sending troops to occupy the campus of ITB (Bandung Institute of Technology) from January–March 1978. In April 1978, Suharto moved decisively by issuing a decree on "Normalisation of Campus Life" (NKK) which prohibited political activities on-campus not related to academic pursuits.

On 15–16 January 1974, Suharto faced a significant challenge when violent riots broke out in Jakarta during a visit by the Japanese prime minister Kakuei Tanaka. Students demonstrating against increasing dominance of Japanese investors were encouraged by General Sumitro, deputy commander of the armed forces. Sumitro was an ambitious general who disliked the strong influence of Suharto's Aspri inner circle. Suharto learned that the riots were engineered by Sumitro to destabilise the government, resulting in Sumitro's dismissal and forced retirement. This incident is referred to as the Malari incident (Malapetaka Lima Belas Januari, Disaster of 15 January). However, Suharto also disbanded Aspri to appease popular dissent. In 1980, fifty prominent political figures signed the Petition of Fifty, which criticised Suharto's use of Pancasila to silence his critics. Suharto refused to address the petitioners' concerns, and some of them were imprisoned with others having restrictions imposed on their movements.

==== Growing corruption ====
The growth of the economy coincided with the rapid expansion of corruption, collusion, and nepotism (Korupsi, Kolusi, dan Nepotisme / KKN). In the early 1980s, Suharto's children, particularly Siti Hardiyanti Rukmana ("Tutut"), Hutomo Mandala Putra ("Tommy"), and Bambang Trihatmodjo, had grown into greedy adults. Their companies were given lucrative government contracts and protected from market competition by monopolies. Examples include the toll-expressway market which was monopolised by Tutut, the national car project monopolised by Bambang and Tommy, and even the cinema market, monopolised by 21 Cineplex (owned by Suharto's cousin Sudwikatmono). The family is said to control about 36,000 km^{2} of real estate in Indonesia, including 100,000 m^{2} of prime office space in Jakarta and nearly 40% of the land in East Timor. Additionally, Suharto's family members received free shares in 1,251 of Indonesia's most lucrative domestic companies (mostly run by Suharto's ethnic-Chinese cronies), while foreign-owned companies were encouraged to establish "strategic partnerships" with Suharto family companies. Meanwhile, the myriad of yayasans run by the Suharto family grew even larger, levying millions of dollars in "donations" from the public and private sectors each year.

Suharto created a network of charitable organizations (yayasan) run by the military and his family members, which extracted "donations" from domestic and foreign enterprises in exchange for necessary government support and permits. While some proceeds were used for charitable purposes, much of the money was recycled as a slush fund to reward political allies and to maintain support for the New Order.

In 1997, Forbes listed Suharto as the fourth richest person in the world with an individual net worth of $16 billion, despite drawing an annual salary in his last peak year of only $21,000. The Suharto family owned or controlled 3.6 million hectares of prime Indonesian land, an area comparable to all of Belgium, and directly owned or had controlling equity in at least 564 companies, with no Indonesian economic sector untouched. With $100,000 of seed capital, Tommy Suharto got his start in 1984 at age 22. Within ten weeks his Humpuss Group already had twenty subsidiaries, which soon ballooned to sixty. A year later he acquired Perta Oil Marketing, a subsidiary of the state oil company Pertamina, instantly making him a major crude-oil broker and transporter. Perta generated profits of $1 million per month. Most of Indonesia's toll roads were built and operated by the stateowned firm Jasa Marga, with untold markups and opportunities for skimming and theft for oligarchs as the projects were completed. In 1989, Suharto issued a decree granting his daughter Tutut 75% of profits from all toll roads her group operated jointly with Jasa Marga, driving costs up still further. Bambang positioned his group as a partner of major foreign power companies and forced the state-run power company, PLN, to buy electricity at inflated rates. According to one estimate from the 24 May 1999 cover story in the international issue of Time magazine, the total wealth amassed by the Suharto family over three decades in power was $73.24 billion. Setting aside $9 billion earned from interest on deposits, three-fourths of this wealth was derived from grabbing the country's oil, gas, and mining resources, or muscling in on state corporations and major government contracts. The entrepreneurial value added from these Suharto family companies was, by all accounts, almost zero.

In early 2004, the German anti-corruption NGO Transparency International released a list of what it believed to be the ten most self-enriching leaders in the previous two decades; in order of amount allegedly stolen in USD, the highest-ranking of these was Suharto and his family who are alleged to have embezzled $15 billion – $35 billion.

=== Later presidency (1980s–1990s) ===
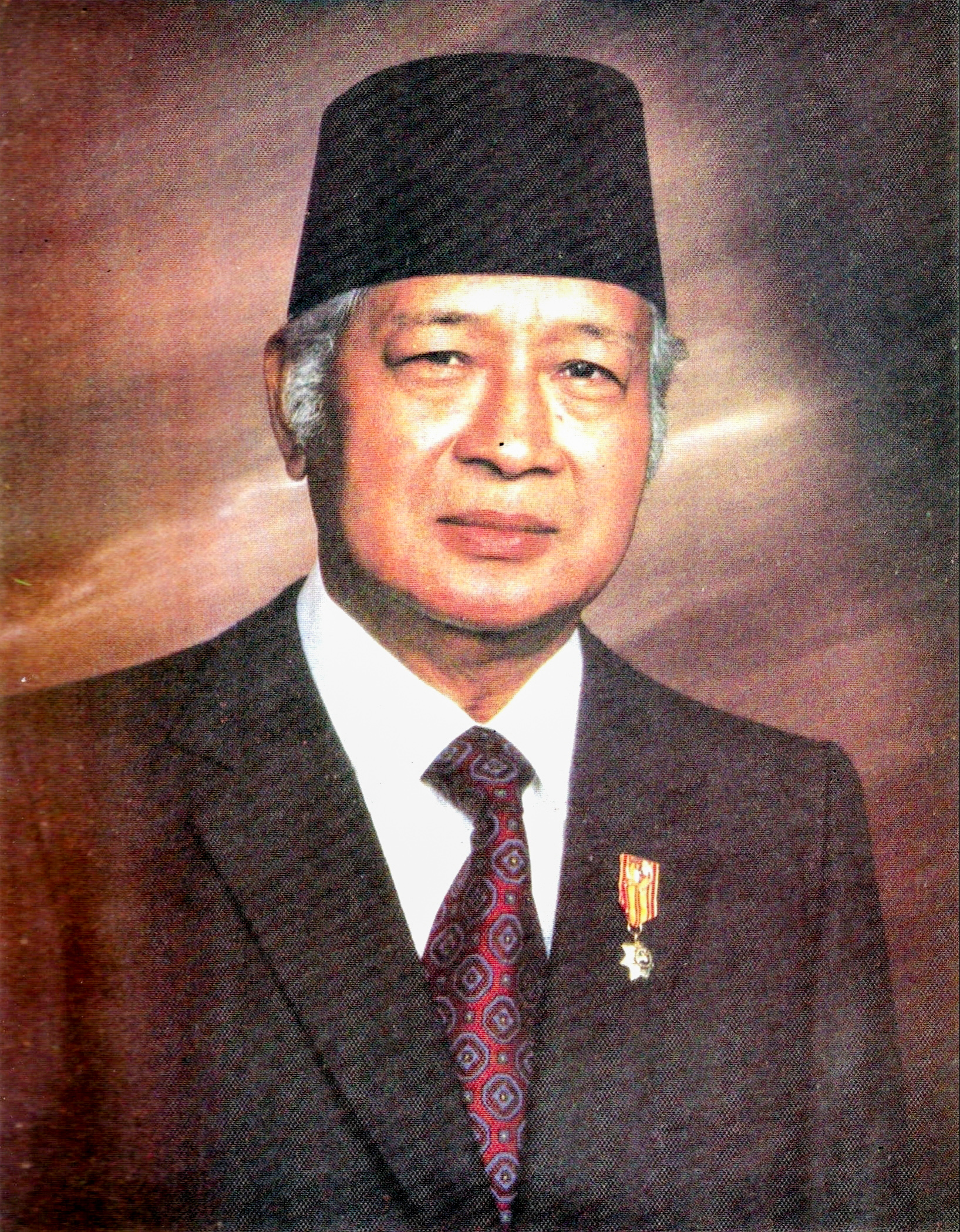
Official portrait, 1988

By the 1980s, Suharto's grip on power was maintained by the emasculation of civil society, engineered elections, and use of the military's coercive powers. Upon his retirement from the military in June 1976, Suharto undertook a re-organization of the armed forces that concentrated power away from commanders to the president. In March 1983, he appointed General Leonardus Benjamin Moerdani as head of the armed forces who adopted a hard-line approach on elements who challenged the administration. As a Roman Catholic, he was not a political threat to Suharto. From 1983 to 1985, army squads killed up to 10,000 suspected criminals in response to a spike in the crime rate (see "Petrus killings"). Suharto's imposition of Pancasila as the sole ideology caused protests from conservative Islamic groups who considered Islamic law to be above all other conceptions.

The Tanjung Priok massacre saw the army kill up to 100 conservative Muslim protesters in September 1984. A retaliatory series of small bombings, including the bombing of Borobudur, led to arrests of hundreds of conservative Islamic activists, including future parliamentary leader AM Fatwa and Abu Bakar Bashir (later leader of Jemaah Islamiyah). Attacks on police by a resurgent Free Aceh Movement in 1989 led to a military operation which killed 2,000 people and ended the insurgency by 1992. In 1984, the Suharto government sought increased control over the press by issuing a law requiring all media to possess a press operating license (Surat Izin Usaha Penerbitan Pers, SIUPP) which could be revoked at any time by Ministry of Information.

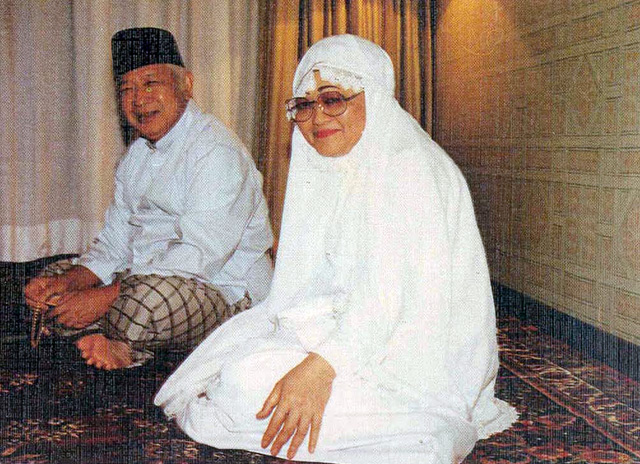
Suharto and his wife in Islamic attire after performing the hajj in 1991

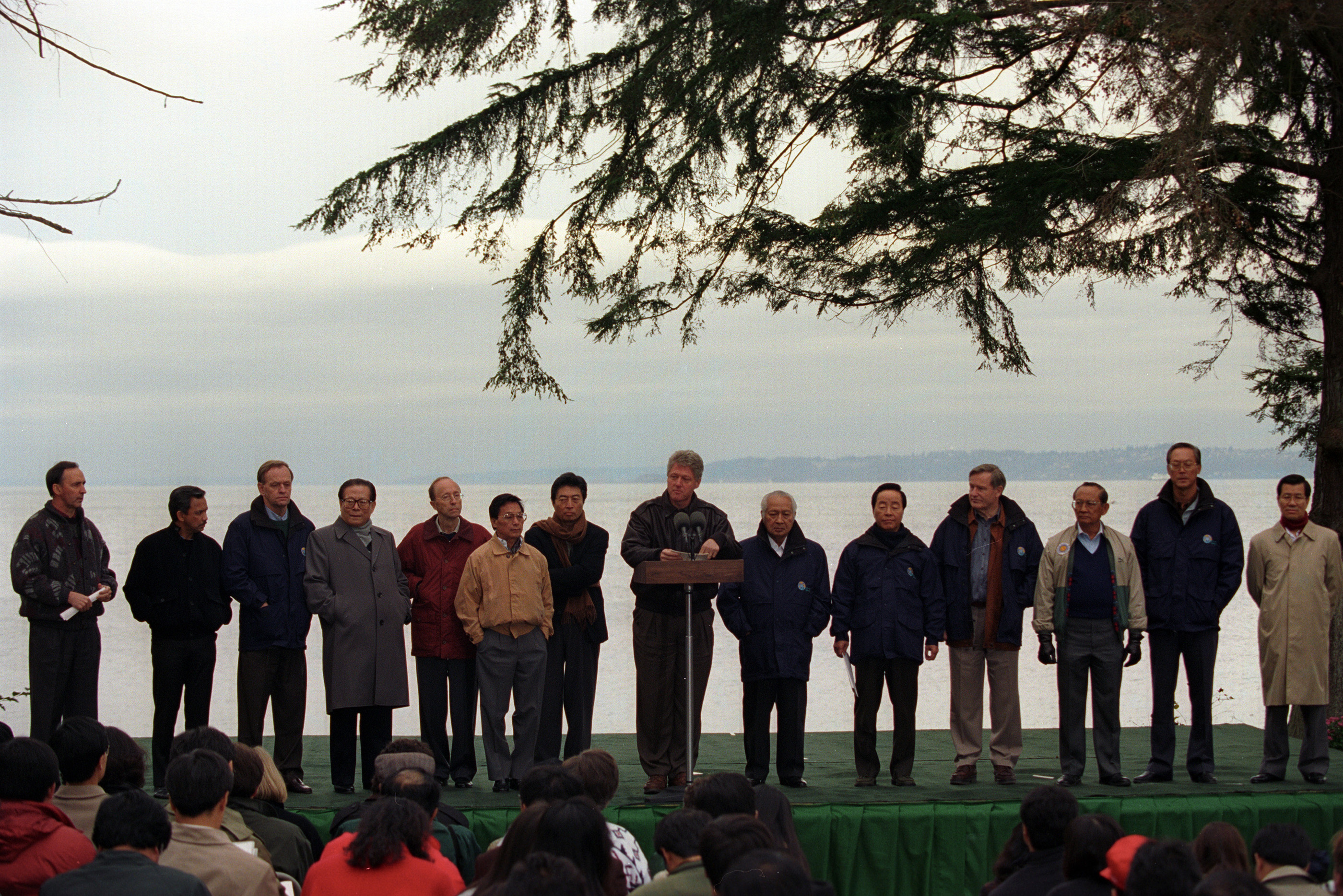
Suharto standing next to the right of U.S. president Bill Clinton during 1993 APEC Summit in Seattle, Washington

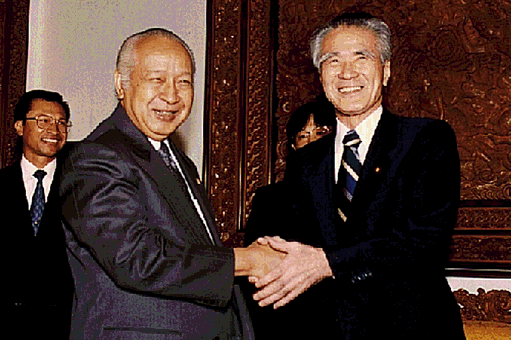
Suharto with Japanese prime minister Tomiichi Murayama in 1994

With the end of communism and the Cold War, Suharto's human rights record came under greater international scrutiny, particularly following the 1991 Santa Cruz massacre in East Timor. Suharto was elected as head of the Non-Aligned Movement in 1992, while Indonesia became a founding member of APEC in 1989 and host to the Bogor APEC Summit in 1994. Domestically, the business dealings of Suharto's family created discontent among the military who lost access to power and lucrative rent-seeking opportunities. The March 1988 MPR session, military legislators attempted to pressure Suharto by unsuccessfully seeking to block the nomination of Sudharmono, a Suharto-loyalist, as vice-president. Moerdani's criticism of the Suharto family's corruption saw the president dismiss him from the position of military chief. Suharto proceeded to slowly "de-militarise" his regime; he dissolved the powerful Kopkamtib in September 1988 and ensured key military positions were held by loyalists.

In an attempt to diversify his power base away from the military, Suharto began courting support from Islamic elements. He undertook a much-publicised hajj pilgrimage in 1991, took up the name of Haji Mohammad Suharto, and promoted Islamic values and the careers of Islamic-oriented generals. To win support from the nascent Muslim business community who resented the dominance of Chinese-Indonesian conglomerates, Suharto formed the Indonesian Association of Muslim Intellectuals (ICMI) in November 1990, which was led by his protégé B.J. Habibie, the Minister for Research and Technology since 1978. During this period, race riots against ethnic-Chinese begin to occur quite regularly, beginning with the April 1994 riot in Medan. By the 1990s, Suharto's government came to be dominated by civilian politicians such as Habibie, Harmoko, Ginandjar Kartasasmita, and Akbar Tanjung, who owed their position solely to Suharto. As a sign of Habibie's growing clout, when two prominent Indonesian magazines and a tabloid newspaper reported on criticism over Habibie's purchase of almost the entire fleet of the disbanded East German Navy in 1993 (most of the vessels were of scrap-value), the Ministry of Information ordered the offending publications be closed down on 21 June 1994. In 1993, the Purna Bhakti Pertiwi Museum was opened on the initiative of Tien Suharto. It houses and displays Suharto collections including artworks and souvenirs, received from various world leaders and Indonesian people.

In the 1990s, elements within the growing Indonesian middle class created by Suharto's economic development were becoming restless with his autocracy and the corruption of his children, fuelling demands for "Reformasi" (reform) of the almost 30-year-old New Order government. A significant element of the middle class had no memory of the events leading up to Suharto's rise to power. By 1996, Sukarno's daughter, Megawati Sukarnoputri, chairwoman of the normally compliant PDI, was becoming an opposition figure for this growing discontent. In response, Suharto backed a co-opted faction of PDI led by Suryadi, which ousted Megawati as PDI leader. On 27 July 1996, an attack by soldiers and hired thugs led by Lieutenant-General Sutiyoso on demonstrating Megawati supporters in Jakarta resulted in fatal riots and looting. This incident was followed by the arrest of 200 democracy activists, 23 of whom were kidnapped, and some killed, by army squads led by Suharto's son-in-law, Major-General Prabowo Subianto. In 1995, Suharto released a special 1,54 troy ounce gold coin worth of 850,000 rupiah with his face on one side of the coin in the celebration of 50th anniversary of Indonesian Independence. On 5 October 1997, he awarded himself and generals Sudirman and Abdul Haris Nasution the honorary rank of five-star "grand general."

== Economic crisis and downfall ==
=== Asian financial crisis ===
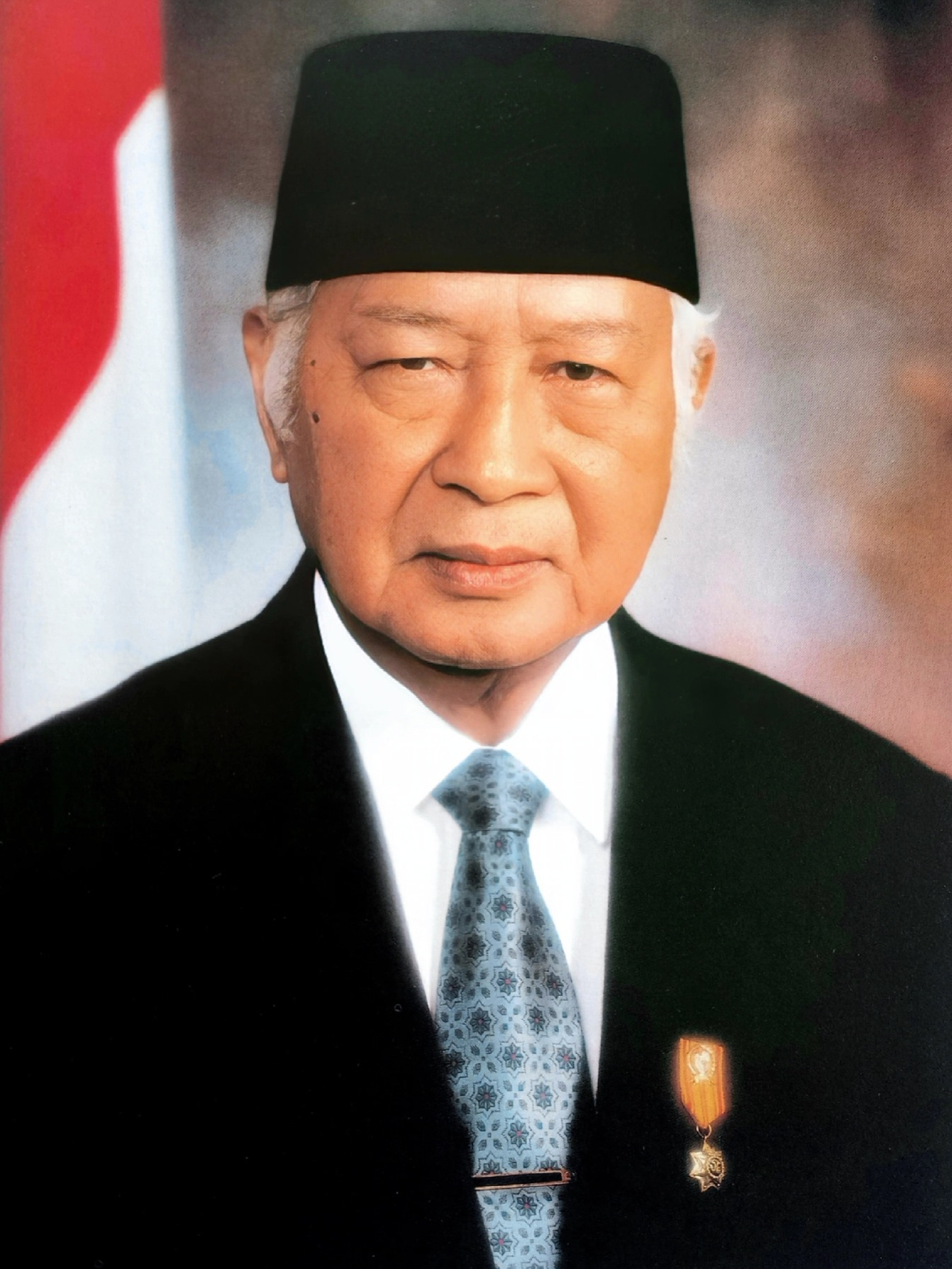
Last official portrait taken in March 1998, two months before his resignation

Indonesia was the country hardest hit by the 1997 Asian financial crisis. From mid-1997 there were large capital outflows and against the US dollar. Due to poor bank lending practices, many Indonesian companies borrowed cheaper US dollar loans while their income is mainly in Indonesian rupiah. The weakening rupiah spurred panic buying of US dollar by these companies, causing the Indonesian rupiah to drop in value from a pre-crisis level of Rp. 2,600 to a low point in early 1998 of around Rp. 17,000. Consequently, many companies were bankrupted and the economy shrank by 13.7%, leading to sharp increases in unemployment and poverty across the country.

Efforts by the central bank to defend the rupiah proved futile and only drained the country's dollar reserves. In exchange for US$43 billion in liquidity aid, between October 1997 and the following April, Suharto signed three letters of intent with the International Monetary Fund (IMF) for an economic reform process. In January 1998, the government was forced to provide emergency liquidity assistance (BLBI), issue blanket guarantees for bank deposits and set-up the Indonesian Bank Restructuring Agency to take over management of troubled banks to prevent the collapse of the financial system. Among the steps taken on IMF recommendation, the government raised an interest rate up to 70% pa in February 1998, which further worsened the contraction of the economy. In December 1997, Suharto did not attend an ASEAN presidents' summit for the first time, which was later revealed to be due to a minor stroke, creating speculation about his health and the immediate future of his presidency. In mid-December, as the crisis swept through Indonesia and an estimated $150 billion of capital was being withdrawn from the country, he appeared at a press conference to re-assert his authority and to urge people to trust the government and the collapsing rupiah.

However, his attempts to re-instil confidence had little effect. Evidence suggested that his family and associates were being spared the most stringent requirements of the IMF reform process, further undermining confidence in the economy and his leadership. The economic meltdown was accompanied by increasing political tension. Anti-Chinese riots occurred in Situbondo (1996), Tasikmalaya (1996), Banjarmasin (1997), and Makassar (1997); violent ethnic clashes broke out between the Dayak and Madurese settlers in Central Kalimantan in 1997. Golkar won the rigged 1997 election, and in March 1998, Suharto was voted unanimously to another five-year term. He nominated his protégé B. J. Habibie as vice president then stacking the cabinet with his own family and business associates, including his eldest daughter Tutut as Minister of Social Affairs. The appointments and the government's unrealistic 1998 budget created further currency instability, rumours, and panic; which led to a run on stores and pushed up prices. The government increased the fuel prices further by 70% in May 1998, which triggered another wave of riots in Medan.

=== Fall and resignation ===
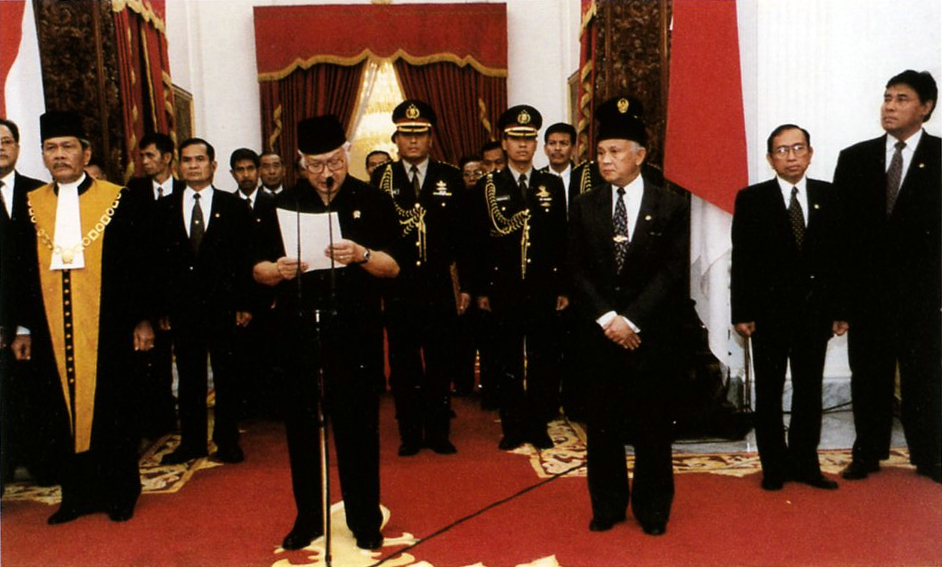
Suharto reading his resignation speech at Merdeka Palace on 21 May 1998. His vice president and successor, B. J. Habibie, stands on his left hand side.

With Suharto increasingly seen as the source of the country's mounting economic and political crises, prominent political figures, including Muslim politician Amien Rais, spoke out against his presidency, and in January 1998 university students began organizing nationwide demonstrations. The crisis climaxed while Suharto was on a state visit to Egypt on 12 May 1998, when security forces killed four demonstrators from Jakarta's Trisakti University. Rioting and looting across Jakarta and other cities over the following days destroyed thousands of buildings and killed over 1,000 people. Ethnic Chinese and their businesses were particular targets in the violence. Theories on the origin of the violence include rivalry between military chief General Wiranto and Army Strategic Commander Lt. Gen. Prabowo Subianto, and the suggestion of deliberate provocation by Suharto to divert blame for the crisis to the ethnic-Chinese and discredit the student movement.

On 16 May, tens of thousands of university students demanded Suharto's resignation, and occupied the grounds and roof of the parliament building. Upon Suharto's return to Jakarta, he offered to resign in 2003 and to reshuffle his cabinet. These efforts failed when his political allies deserted him by refusing to join the proposed new cabinet. According to Wiranto, on 18 May, Suharto issued a decree which provided authority to him to take any measures to restore security; however, Wiranto decided not to enforce the decree to prevent conflict with the population. On 21 May 1998, Suharto announced his resignation, upon which vice-president Habibie assumed the presidency in accordance with the constitution. Documents from the United States Department of State indicate that the Clinton Administration sought to maintain close ties with the Indonesian military in the aftermath of Suharto's fall from power.

== Post-presidency (1998–2008) ==
=== Corruption charges ===
After resigning from the presidency, Suharto became a recluse in his family's compound in the Menteng area of Jakarta, protected by soldiers and rarely making public appearances. Suharto's family spent much of their time fending off corruption investigations. However, Suharto himself was protected from grave prosecution by politicians who owed their positions to the former president, as indicated in the leaked telephone conversation between President Habibie and attorney-general Andi Muhammad Ghalib in February 1999. In May 1999, Time Asia estimated Suharto's family fortune at US$15 billion in cash, shares, corporate assets, real estate, jewellery and fine art. Suharto sued the magazine seeking more than US$27 billion in damages for libel over the article. On 10 September 2007, Indonesia's Supreme Court awarded Suharto damages against Time Asia magazine, ordering it to pay him one trillion rupiah ($128.59 million). The High Court reversed the judgment of an appellate court and Central Jakarta district court (made in 2000 and 2001).

Suharto was placed highest on Transparency International's list of corrupt leaders with alleged misappropriation of between US$15–35 billion during his 32-year presidency. On 29 May 2000, Suharto was placed under house arrest when Indonesian authorities began to investigate the corruption during his presidency. In July 2000, it was announced that he was to be accused of embezzling US$571 million of government donations to one of several foundations under his control and then using the money to finance family investments. However, in September court-appointed doctors announced that he could not stand trial because of his declining health. State prosecutors tried again in 2002, but then doctors cited an unspecified brain disease. On 26 March 2008, a civil court judge acquitted Suharto of corruption but ordered his charitable foundation, Supersemar, to pay US$110 million (£55 million).

In 2002, Suharto's son Tommy Suharto was sentenced to 15 years' jail for ordering the killing of a judge (who had previously convicted him of corruption), illegal weapons possession, and fleeing justice. In 2006, he was paroled on "conditional release". In 2003, Suharto's half-brother Probosutedjo was tried and convicted for corruption and the loss of $10 million from the Indonesian state. He was sentenced to four years in jail. He later won a reduction of his sentence to two years, initiating a probe by the Corruption Eradication Commission into the alleged scandal of the "judicial mafia" which uncovered offers of $600,000 to various judges. Probosutedjo confessed to the scheme in October 2005, leading to the arrest of his lawyers. His full four-year term was reinstated. After a brief standoff at a hospital, in which he was reportedly protected by a group of police officers, he was arrested on 30 November 2005. On 9 July 2007, Indonesian prosecutors filed a civil lawsuit against Suharto, to recover state funds ($440 million or £219 million, which allegedly disappeared from a scholarship fund, and a further $1.1 billion in damages).

=== Illness and death ===
After resigning from the presidency, Suharto was hospitalised repeatedly for stroke, heart, and intestinal problems. His declining health hindered attempts to prosecute him as his lawyers successfully claimed that his condition rendered him unfit for trial. Moreover, there was little support within Indonesia for any attempts to prosecute him. In 2006, Attorney General Abdurrahman announced that a team of twenty doctors would be asked to evaluate Suharto's health and fitness for trial. One physician, Brigadier-General Dr Marjo Subiandono, stated his doubts about by noting that "[Suharto] has two permanent cerebral defects." In a later Financial Times report, Attorney General Abdurrahman discussed the re-examination, and called it part of a "last opportunity" to prosecute Suharto criminally. Attorney General Abdurrahman left open the possibility of filing suit against the Suharto estate.

On 4 January 2008, Suharto was taken to the Pertamina Central Hospital, Jakarta with complications arising from poor health, swelling of limbs and stomach, and partial renal failure. His health fluctuated for several weeks but progressively worsened with anaemia and low blood pressure due to heart and kidney complications, internal bleeding, fluid on his lungs, and blood in his faeces and urine which caused a haemoglobin drop. On 23 January, Suharto's health worsened further, as a sepsis infection spread through his body. His family consented to the removal of life support machines if his condition did not improve, and he died on 27 January at 1:09 pm.

Minutes after his death, then-Indonesian President Susilo Bambang Yudhoyono held a news conference declaring Suharto as one of Indonesia's "best sons" and invited the country to give the highest respect and honour to the ex-president. Suharto's body was taken from Jakarta to the Astana Giribangun mausoleum complex in Karanganyar Regency, near the Central Java city of Solo. He was buried alongside his late wife in a state military funeral with full honours, with the Kopassus elite forces and KOSTRAD commandos as the honour guard and pallbearers and Commander of Group II Kopassus Surakarta Lt. Colonel Asep Subarkah. In attendance were President Yudhoyono, who presided over the ceremony, as well as the vice-president, government ministers, and armed forces chiefs of staff. Tens of thousands of people lined the streets to see the convoy. Condolences were offered by many regional heads of state. President Yudhoyono that afternoon declared a week of official mourning starting from Suharto's day of death. During this period, all flags of Indonesia were flown at half-mast.

== Political rehabilitation ==
Conservatism in Indonesia refers to political, social, and cultural views that emphasize the preservation of traditional values and social norms. In Indonesia, it is often associated with support for religious traditions, cultural heritage, and restoring Islamic values. Starting in the early 2010s, the Javanese language slogan Piye kabare le? Isih penak jamanku to? (lit. 'How are you doing? It was still better in my time, right?') featuring pictures of Suharto was heavily distributed around Indonesia in many forms, such as stickers, t-shirts and on the internet. The slogan can also be found on political campaign billboards and affixed to public transportation, such as minibuses as well as trucks and pedicabs.

Surveys taken in 2011 and 2018 have found that Indonesians named Suharto as the most successful in carrying out his duties as president.

On 25 September 2024, in one of its last acts for the 2019–2024 period, the People's Consultative Assembly repealed Clause 4 of MPR Resolution No. XI/MPR/1998, which had accused Suharto and his cronies of acts of corruption, collusion, and nepotism and specifically named him. The stated reason for this was because Suharto was never put on trial for these accusations before his death in 2008. This move has reignited debate as to whether Suharto should be awarded the National Hero status.

On 10 November 2025, Suharto was named as a National Hero, along with nine other names—including fellow former president Abdurrahman Wahid—in a ceremony presided by President Prabowo Subianto, Suharto's former son-in-law. In response to this, around 100 people gathered in Jakarta and more than 16,000 people signed an online petition to protest against the nomination.

== Honours ==
=== National honours ===
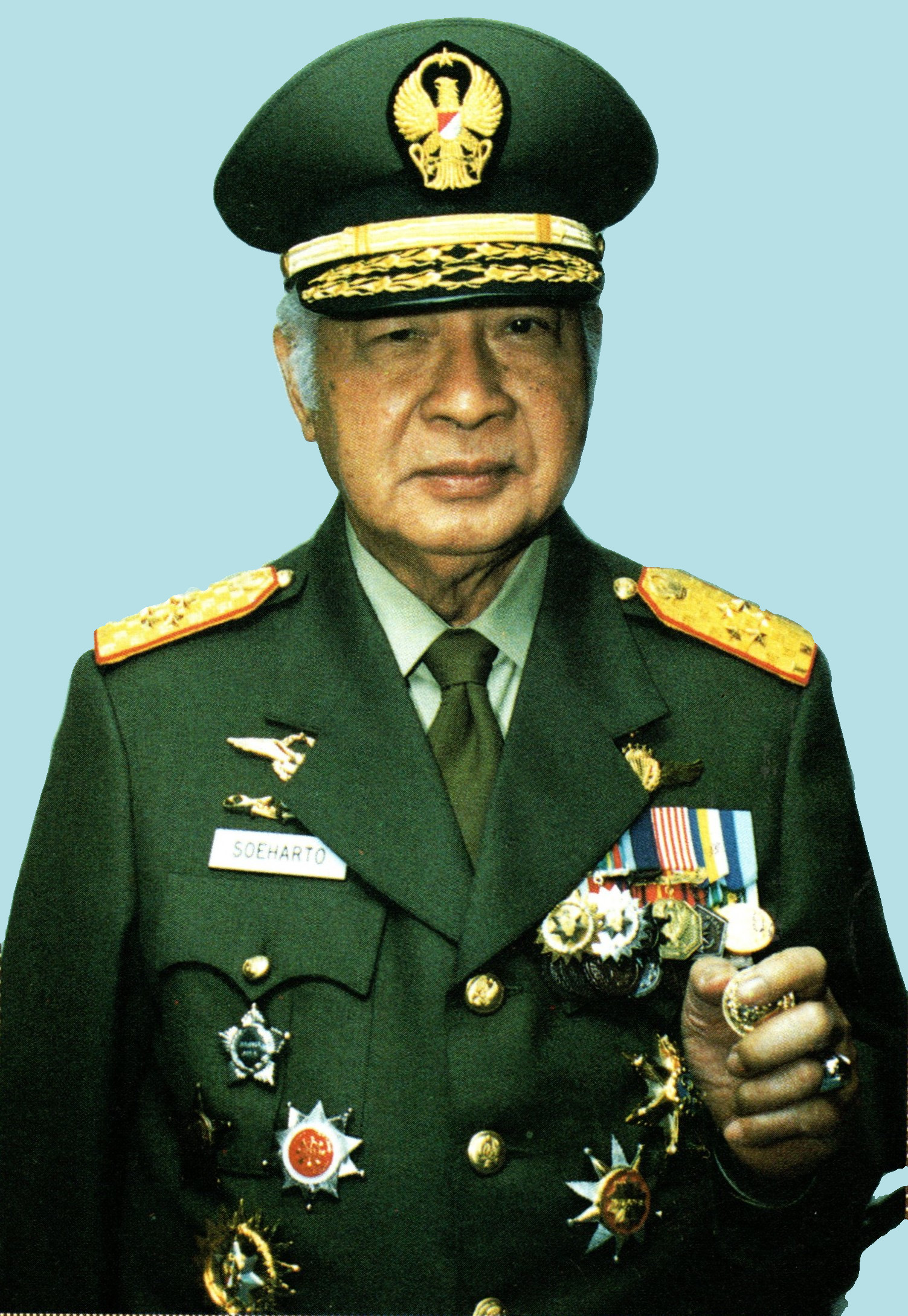
Suharto in full military uniform with some of his decorations, 1997

As an officer in the Indonesian Army (1940–1974), and then as president of Indonesia (1967–1998), he received several civilian and military Star Decorations from Indonesia, namely:

Indonesia:

- Star of the Republic of Indonesia, 1st Class (Indonesian: Bintang Republik Indonesia Adipurna)
- Star of Mahaputera, 1st Class (Indonesian: Bintang Mahaputera Adipurna)
- Star of Merit, 1st Class (Indonesian: Bintang Jasa Utama)
- The Sacred Star (Indonesian: Bintang Sakti)
- Star of Meritorious Service (Indonesian: Bintang Dharma)
- Guerrilla Star (Indonesian: Bintang Gerilya)
- Star of Culture Parama Dharma (Indonesian: Bintang Budaya Parama Dharma)
- Star of Yudha Dharma, 1st Class (Indonesian: Bintang Yudha Dharma Utama)
- Star of Kartika Eka Paksi, 1st Class (Indonesian: Bintang Kartika Eka Paksi Utama)
- Star of Kartika Eka Paksi, 2nd Class (Indonesian: Bintang Kartika Eka Paksi Pratama)
- Star of Kartika Eka Paksi, 3rd Class (Indonesian: Bintang Kartika Eka Paksi Nararya)
- Star of Jalasena, 1st Class (Indonesian: Bintang Jalasena Utama)
- Star of Swa Bhuwana Paksa, 1st Class (Indonesian: Bintang Swa Bhuwana Paksa Utama)
- Star of Bhayangkara, 1st Class (Indonesian: Bintang Bhayangkara Utama)
- Garuda Star (Indonesian: Bintang Garuda)
- Indonesian Armed Forces 8 Years of Service Star (Indonesian: Bintang Sewindu Angkatan Perang)
- Military Long Service Medal, 16 Years Service (Indonesian: Satyalancana Kesetiaan 16 Tahun)
- Military Campaign Medal (Indonesian: Satyalancana Teladan)
- 1st Campaign Commemoration Medal (Indonesian: Satyalancana Perang Kemerdekaan I)
- 2nd Campaign Commemoration Medal (Indonesian: Satyalancana Perang Kemerdekaan II)
- 1st Military Operations Service Medal (Indonesian: Satyalancana G.O.M I)
- 2nd Military Operations Service Medal (Indonesian: Satyalancana G.O.M II)
- 3rd Military Operations Service Medal (Indonesian: Satyalancana G.O.M III)
- 4th Military Operations Service Medal (Indonesian: Satyalancana G.O.M IV)
- West New Guinea Military Campaign Medal (Indonesian: Satyalancana Satya Dharma)
- Northern Borneo Military Campaign Medal (Indonesian: Satyalancana Wira Dharma)
- Medal for Combat Against Communists (Indonesian: Satyalancana Penegak)

=== Foreign honours ===
In addition, he also received several foreign decorations:

- Argentina:
  - Collar of the Order of the Liberator General San Martín (1972)
- Austria:
  - Grand Star of the Decoration of Honour for Services to the Republic of Austria (1973)
- Belgium:
  - Grand Cordon of the Order of Leopold (1973)
- Brunei:
  - Recipient of the Most Esteemed Royal Family Order of the Crown of Brunei (DKMB) (1988)
  - Recipient of the Most Esteemed Family Order of Laila Utama (DK) (1988)
- Cambodia:
  - Grand Collar of the National Order of Independence (1968)
- Egypt:
  - Grand Collar of the Order of the Nile (1977)
- Ethiopia:
  - Grand Cordon and Collar of the Order of the Queen of Sheba (1968)
- France:
  - Grand Cross of the National Order of the Legion of Honour (1972)
- Iran:
  - First Class of the Order of Pahlavi
  - Recipient of the Commemorative Medal of the 2,500-year Celebration of the Persian Empire (1971)
- Italy:
  - Knight Grand Cross with Collar of the Order of Merit of the Italian Republic (OMRI) (1972)
- Japan:
  - Grand Cordon of the Supreme Order of the Chrysanthemum (1968)
- Jordan:
  - Grand Cordon with Collar of the Order of Al-Hussein bin Ali (1986)
- Kuwait:
  - Collar of the Order of Mubarak the Great (1977)
- Malaysia:
  - Honorary Recipient of the Most Exalted Order of the Crown of the Realm (DMN) (1988)
  - Johor:
    - Grand Commander of the Most Esteemed Royal Family Order of Johor (DK Johor) (1990)
  - Perak:
    - Recipient Member of the Most Esteemed Royal Family Order of Perak (DK Perak) (1988)
- Mexico:
  - Grand Cross of the Order of the Aztec Eagle
- Netherlands:
  - Knight Grand Cross of the Order of the Netherlands Lion (1970)
  - Commander of the Most Excellent Order of the Golden Ark
- Oman:
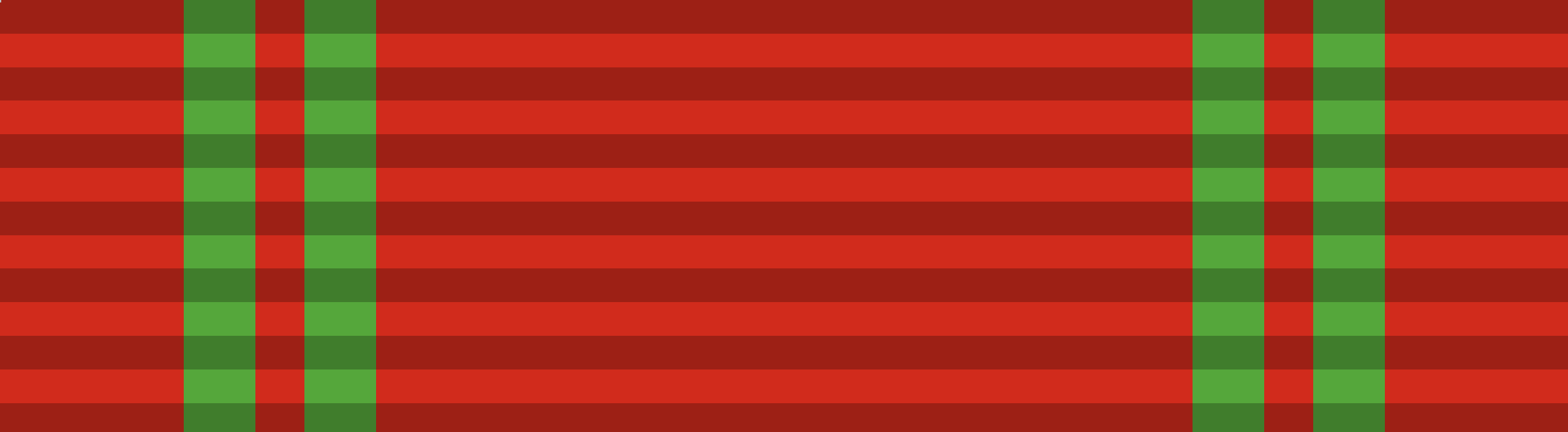
  - First Class of the Civil Order of Oman (1978)
- Pakistan:
  - Nishan-e-Pakistan (NPk) (1982)
- Philippines:
  - Grand Collar (Raja) of the Order of Sikatuna (GCS) (1968)
  - Grand Collar (Maringal na Kuwintas) of the Order of the Golden Heart (GCGH) (1968)
- Qatar:
  - Collar of the Order of the Independence (1977)
- Romania:
  - First Class of the Order of the Star of the Romanian Socialist Republic (1982)
- Saudi Arabia:
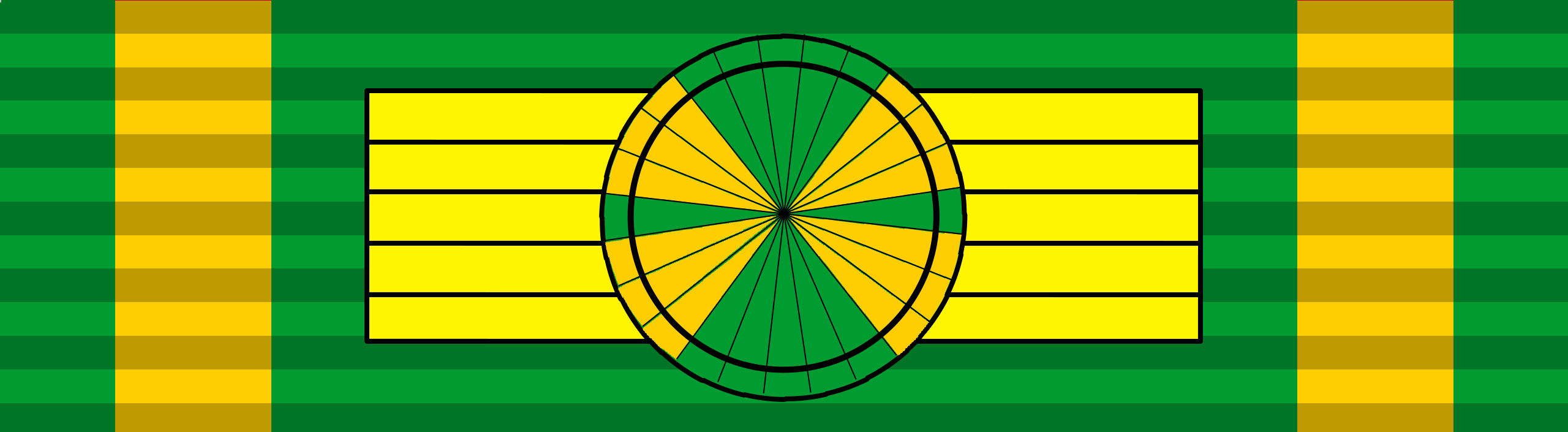
  - Great Chain of the Badr (1977)
- Singapore:
  - Recipient of the Order of Temasek (DUT) (1974)
- South Africa:
  - Grand Cross of the Order of Good Hope (1997)
- South Korea:
  - Grand Order of Mugunghwa (1981)
- Spain:
  - Grand Cross with Collar of the Order of Isabella the Catholic (CYC) (1980)
- Syria:
  - Member 1st Class of the Order of the Umayyads (1977)
- Thailand:
  - Knight of the Most Auspicious Order of the Rajamitrabhorn (KRM) (1970)
- Tunisia:
  - Grand Cordon of the Order of the Republic (1995)
- Ukraine:
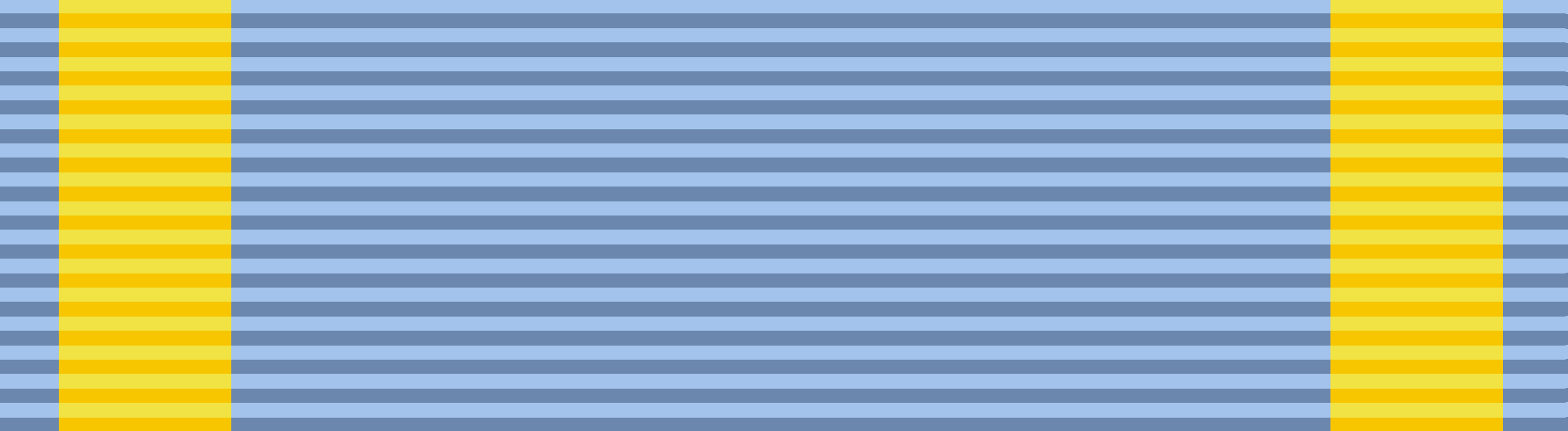
  - First Class of the Order of Prince Yaroslav the Wise (1997)
- United Arab Emirates :
  - Grand Cordon with Collar of the Order of Unity (1977)
- United Kingdom:
  - Honorary Knight Grand Cross (Military Division) of the Order of the Bath (GCB) (1974)
- Venezuela:
  - Grand Cordon with Collar of the Order of the Liberator (1988)
- West Germany:
  - Grand Cross Special Class of the Order of Merit of the Federal Republic of Germany (1970)
- Yemen:
  - Grand Cordon with Collar of the Order of the Republic
- Yugoslavia:
  - Yugoslav Star with Sash of the Order of the Yugoslav Star (1975)

=== Places and statue ===
Suharto's childhood house in Kemusuk is currently a memorial museum, called Memorial Jenderal Besar HM Soeharto. A statue of him stands in front of the museum. It was built by Probosutedjo and was inaugurated in 2013.

FELDA Soeharto, a village in Selangor, is named after him. He visited the village in 1970 as part of a momentous visit to normalize the Indonesia–Malaysia relations.

Istiklal Mosque in Sarajevo was initiated by Suharto as a gift for the people of Bosnia and Herzegovina, to replace the hundreds of mosques destroyed during the Bosnian War. Suharto famously visited Sarajevo in 1995 to help mediate the ongoing conflict (even though a UN-owned aircraft that passed through Bosnia was shot down two days earlier). The mosque is sometimes referred by locals as the Suharto Mosque.

== In popular culture ==
Suharto has been portrayed by five Indonesian actors in several movies.

- Kaharuddin Syah portrayed Suharto in the 1980 movie Janur Kuning, directed by Alam Surawidjaja.
- Antonius Yacobus portrayed Suharto in the 1982 movie Serangan Fajar, directed by Arifin C. Noer.
- Amoroso Katamsi portrayed Suharto in the 1984 movie Pengkhianatan G30S/PKI and the 1988 movie Djakarta 66, both directed by Arifin C. Noer. He also portrayed Suharto in the 2015 drama movie Di Balik 98, directed by Lukman Sardi.
- Marcell Siahaan portrayed Suharto in the 2010 comedic movie Laskar Pemimpi, directed by Monty Tiwa.
- Tio Pakusadewo portrayed Suharto in the 2012 biopic movie Habibie & Ainun, directed by Faozan Rizal.

== See also ==
- History of Indonesia
- High-ranking commanders of the Indonesian National Revolution
- Asas tunggal Pancasila

== Notes ==
Political offices
Preceded by Sukarno	President of Indonesia; 12 March 1967 – 21 May 1998	Succeeded by Bacharuddin Jusuf Habibie
Preceded by Sukarno as Prime Minister of Indonesia	Chairman of the Cabinet Presidium; 25 July 1966 – 17 October 1967	Office abolished
Preceded by Sarbini Martodihardjo	Minister of Defense and Security; 1966–1971	Succeeded by Maraden Panggabean
Military offices
Preceded by Sumitro Sastrodihardjo	Commander of Kopkamtib; 1974–1978	Succeeded by Sudomo
Preceded by Abdul Haris Nasution as Chief of Staff of the Armed Forces	Commander of the Indonesian Armed Forces; 1968–1973	Succeeded by Maraden Panggabean
New command	Commander of Kopkamtib; 1965–1969	Succeeded by Maraden Panggabean
Preceded by Ahmad Yani; Pranoto Reksosamudro (acting)	Chief of Staff of the Indonesian Army; 1965–1968	Succeeded by Maraden Panggabean
New command	Commander of Kostrad; 1961–1965	Succeeded by Umar Wirahadikusumah
Party political offices
New office	Chairman of the Central Committee of Golkar; 1983–1998	Succeeded by Harmoko
Diplomatic posts
Preceded by Bill Clinton	Chairperson of APEC; 1994	Succeeded by Tomiichi Murayama
Preceded by Dobrica Ćosić	Chair of the Non-Aligned Movement; 1992–1995	Succeeded by Ernesto Samper
New office	Chairperson of ASEAN; 1976	Succeeded by Hussein Onn
