= Confederation of All Indonesian Workers' Unions =

National trade union center in Indonesia

KSPSI
- Confederation of All Indonesian Workers' Unions
- Konfederasi Serikat Pekerja Seluruh Indonesia
- Founded: 20 February 1973 (FBSI); October 1994 (KSPSI)
- Headquarters: Jakarta
- Location: Indonesia
- Members: 4.6 million
- Key people: Jumhur Hidayat, chairman
- Website: dppkspsi.com

The Confederation of All Indonesian Workers' Unions (Indonesian: Konfederasi Serikat Pekerja Seluruh Indonesia, KSPSI) is a national trade union center in Indonesia. It was formed from the All-Indonesia Union of Workers (Indonesian: Federasi Buruh Seluruh Indonesia, FBSI), which was the only legally registered trade union in Indonesia during the Suharto era.
