= KORPRI =

Indonesian workers union

- Employees' Corps of the Republic of Indonesia
- Korps Pegawai Republik Indonesia
- Founded: 29 November 1971
- Headquarters: BAPETEN Building, Central Jakarta
- Key people: President of Indonesia (highest authority since the 1980s)
- Affiliations: Golkar (1971–1998)
- Website: korpri.go.id

The Employees' Corps of the Republic of Indonesia (Indonesian: Korps Pegawai Republik Indonesia, KORPRI), also known as the Indonesian Civil Servants Corps, is a state-regulated organisation of civil service employees.

Created during the New Order as a means to ensure political control of Indonesia's bureaucracy, with all public sector workers obliged to join, KORPRI also functioned as a support mechanism to Golkar, the ruling party of the period. With the emergence of political pluralism in the reformasi period of the late 1990s, KORPRI lost its status as sole organisation within the public sector with the formation of independent trade unions. However, workers classified as civil servants are still required to be members of KORPRI.

== Origins ==
With the consolidation of the New Order dictatorship by the late 1960s, KORPRI was established by Presidential decree in November 1971, bringing all civil servants into an "organizational framework...totally controlled" by the Minister of Home Affairs, General Amirmachmud. Civil servants were required to cease membership in independent trade unions, which were dissolved, and compelled to be members of KORPRI. Workers who refused the order were fired.

== Role during the New Order ==
KORPRI was integrated into Golkar, the organization founded by the military in 1964, and developed as an important force in ensuring that political parties unaligned to the government had no influence at village and sub–district levels. Throughout the New Order period, through government decree, the scope of KORPRI's membership was widened from all civil servants, to include workers in state enterprises, state workers at regional levels and workers in private enterprises where the government held an interest. During the elections of the New Order period, KORPRI's two million members were obliged to campaign on behalf of Golkar. Failure to do so was considered disloyal and as the organisation's chair stated in 1993, "KORPRI will not tolerate any of its members voting for parties other than Golkar."

== Post-1998 ==
Following the downfall of military rule in Indonesia in 1997-98 and the emergence of the reformasi period, trade union pluralism and autonomy became possible. Independent unions emerged in sectors previously covered by KORPRI, including electricity, postal services, telecommunications and teaching. However, trade union law in Indonesia remains contradictory concerning KORPRI's status. Technically, all workers still classified as civil servants remain compelled to be members and pay dues to KORPRI. Furthermore, despite the Indonesian constitution providing universal rights, current labour law does not grant civil servants rights to freedom of association or collective bargaining, which in practice means civil servants cannot form trade unions.
