= Suhadi Mangkusuwondo =

Suhadi Mangkusuwondo (27 December 1927 – 2 August 2021) was an Indonesian economist and former government official. He is professor emeritus at the Faculty of Economics at the University of Indonesia (FE UI).

== Early life and education ==
Suhadi Mangkusuwondo was born in Surakarta, on 27 December 1927 as the child of a civil servant in the Dutch East Indies Department of Finance. After completing primary school in Bondowoso, East Java, he studied at a Dutch-owned high school in Malang. After the Japanese occupation of the Dutch East Indies, he moved to a Japanese-owned junior high school in Bandung.

After the Indonesian National Revolution in 1945, Mangkusuwondo joined the Indonesian forces and later became part of the Indonesian student's army in Malang. He was imprisoned by the Dutch and imprisoned in Bondowoso and then in Surabaya. After his release, he returned to Malang to finish his high school education.

== Career ==
After completing his education in Malang, Suhadi migrated to Jakarta along with two classmates, Widjojo Nitisastro and Rachmat Saleh. He enrolled at the National University but dropped out and entered the newly established Faculty of Economics of the University of Indonesia in Jakarta with a scholarship. Suhadi initially wanted to study political science but chose economics instead. Mangkusuwondo was elected as the first chairman of the faculty's student senate, serving from 1950 to 1952. He and his colleagues asked Sumitro Djojohadikusumo, then Minister of Welfare, to become the faculty's dean.

In 1957, Suhadi was sent to the Massachusetts Institute of Technology (MIT) for postgraduate study. He described the intellectual atmosphere at MIT as "excellent" with the presence of economists such as Charles Kindleberger, Rosenstein-Rodan, Paul Samuelson, Robert Solow, Everett Hagen, and Evsey Domar. Suhadi was encouraged to pursue doctoral studies but returned to Indonesia after the expiration of his fellowship. After teaching for four years at his almamater, Mangkusuwondo resumed his postgraduate studies at the University of California at Berkeley in 1963 and earned a PhD in economics in 1967. His dissertation was titled Industrialization Efforts in Indonesia: The Role of Agriculture and Foreign Trade in the Development of the Industrial Sector.

Upon his return to Indonesia, Mangkusuwondo continued teaching at the University of Indonesia. He was the faculty's deputy dean for academic affairs, director of the faculty's extension program, and was the editor of the journal Economics and Finance in Indonesia (EKI). He was also the chairman of the Sub-consortium for Economics in the Consortium for the Social Sciences at the Department of Education and Culture, where he advised the department on economic education in universities. Aside from teaching at the University of Indonesia, he also taught at the National Defence Institute and the Armed Forces Staff Command School.

In 1968, Mangkusuwondo was drawn into government service by Sumitro, then Minister of Trade. He joined a policy research team that examined various trade policy issues that influenced Indonesia. He became the head of department's research and development agency, from 1973 to 1975 and again from 1983 to 1988.

He also served as Director General of Foreign Trade from 1975 to 1983. During his tenure, Mangkusuwondo was appointed chairman of Indonesia's delegation to the International Conference on Economic Cooperation (ICEC) in Paris in 1975. He also played a significant role in the establishment of the Common Fund for commodities at UNCTAD IV in Nairobi in 1976 and the International Fund for Agricultural Development (IFAD).

He was the representative of Indonesia in the Uruguay Round. Mangkusuwondo joined APEC in 1989 and was appointed as the Indonesian member of the Eminent Persons Group (EPG) in 1992. He played a key role in developing a vision for APEC and provided advice to President Soeharto on the debt problem of highly indebted African countries. He is also a member of Indonesia's National Research Council, the Regional Advisory Board of the ASEAN Economic Bulletin, and the Trade and Development Institute in Jakarta.

== Views ==
Mangkusuwondo's views on economic development are shaped by his experiences during the Old Order period in Indonesia. He emphasizes the importance of market forces and cautions against excessive government intervention. He advocates for a gradual and market-driven approach to regional economic integration, as exemplified by the ASEAN Free Trade Area (AFTA).

== Bibliography ==
- Mangkusuwondo, Suhadi (1996), Arndt, Heinz Wolfgang; Pangestu, Mari Elka; Wie, Thee Kian (eds.), "Recollections of My Careerlections of My Career", Bulletin of Indonesian Economic Studies, 32 (1): 33–49, doi:10.1080/00074919612331336878, ISSN 0007-4918
