= Indonesia Project =

Research centre at Australian National University in Canberra, Australia

The Indonesia Project is a center of research and graduate training on the Indonesian economy at the Australian National University (ANU). It is located in the Arndt-Corden Department of Economics, Crawford School of Public Policy, part of the ANU College of Law, Governance and Policy. It was established in 1965 with an initial grant from the Ford Foundation.

== History ==
In 1963, when he became head of the Department of Economics in the Research School of Pacific Studies, Professor Heinz W. Arndt decided to study the Indonesian economy. This led to the Indonesia Project. As part of the activities of the project, the academic journal the Bulletin of Indonesian Economic Studies (BIES) was established in 1965. Several academic staff were recruited to work on the Indonesian economy including Dr. David Penny and Professor J. Panglaykim. Shortly after the establishment of the project, others were Anne Booth, Howard Dick, Stephen Grenville, Hal Hill, Chris Manning, Peter McCawley and Phyllis Rosendale. In 2015, speaking at the 50th-anniversary celebration of the Project in Canberra, the then-Chancellor of the Australian National University, Gareth Evans, spoke of his own long involvement with Indonesia and said that Arndt's original idea of establishing the Indonesia Project was a "wonderfully visionary decision".

== Activities ==
The Indonesia Project has undertaken many activities related to studies of the Indonesian economy since the mid-1960s. These include the following:

- Publishing the Bulletin of Indonesian Economic Studies (BIES), published three times each year. Professor Arndt was the editor of the BIES from 1965 to 1980. His successors as editor were Professors Anne Booth and Hal Hill and Associate Professors Ross McLeod and Pierre van der Eng. The current editors are Professor Blane Lewis and Arianto Patunru.
- The Indonesia Update Conference, held annually at the ANU since 1983.
- The Indonesia Study Group at the ANU which meets around 40 times each year to discuss a wide range of topics relating to Indonesian studies.
- The Forum Kajian Pembangunan or FKP (Development Studies Forum) which is a series of regular Jakarta seminars held with a network of think tanks and research institutions to discuss development issues.
- Support for active links with scholarly institutions in Indonesia such as the Centre for Strategic and International Studies (CSIS), the Institute for Social and Economic Research at the Economics Faculty, University of Indonesia, The SMERU Sesearch Institute, and the Economics Faculty, Gadjah Mada University, in Yogyakarta.
- The annual Sadli Lecture in Jakarta (since 2007 in collaboration with LPEM FEB UI) and the annual Mubyarto Public Policy Forum in Yogyakarta (since 2017 with FEB UGM) The annual Hadi Soesastro Policy Forum ran from 2013 to 2018 in collaboration with Center for Strategic and International Studies. It will return in June 2024.
- The Indonesia Project archive.
- A wide range of other meetings and conferences, both at the ANU, at other universities in Australia and Indonesia, and with public and private organisations in Australia in Indonesia.
- An active program of public outreach; staff and students in the project often contribute to media comment in Australia and overseas, and often provide blog commentary on current developments in Indonesia.

During the early years after the Indonesia Project was established, the main activities focused on economic issues in Indonesia. Later, and especially after Professor J.A.C. Mackie became head of the Department of Political and Social Change at the ANU in 1980, the activities of the Indonesia project widened to include issues in other areas such as politics, government, social studies, and a range of other topics. Senior staff of the Department of Political and Social Change such as Professor Ed Aspinall and Associate Professor Greg Fealy, and of the School of Culture, History and Language at the ANU such as Dr Marcus Mietzner and Professor Kathryn Robinson, are now involved with Indonesia Project events.

The Indonesia Project has an active policy of working in close partnership with Indonesian colleagues. Well-known Indonesian scholars and public policy makers who have worked with the project since the mid-1960s include Professor Armida Alisjahbana, Professor Boediono, the late Dr Hadi Soesastro, Professor Anwar Nasution, Dr Muhamad Chatib Basri, Professor Mari Pangestu, Professor Panglaykim, Professor Mubyarto, Professor Mohamad Sadli, Dr Sri Mulyani Indrawati, and Dr Thee Kian Wie.

== Management of the Project ==
Professor Arndt led the Indonesia Project from its inception until 1980. Peter McCawley took over management from 1980 to 1986, followed by Professor Hal Hill from 1986 to 1998, Associate Professor Chris Manning from 1998 to 2011, Professor Budy P. Resosudarmo from 2011 to 2017, and Professor Blane Lewis (2017-2023). Professor Resosudarmo took the helm again as head of the Project in mid 2023. Dr Arianto Patunru is the Project's Policy Engagement Coordinator. Since 2024, Firman Witoelar has been the Chief Editor of BIES.

The Project has received strong external funding support from both the Australian Department of Foreign Affairs (DFAT) and AusAID for many years. The staff of the Indonesia Project cooperate closely with DFAT staff in both Canberra and in Jakarta
