= Than Nyun =

Burmese economist and educationist (born 1937)

H.E. Than Nyunt
- သန်းညွှန့်

Deputy Minister for Education
- In office 1994–1999
- Minister: Than Aung

Rector of Yangon Institute of Economics
- In office 1993–1994
- Preceded by: Khin Maung Nyunt
- Succeeded by: Myat Thein

Chairman of Union Civil Service Selection and Training Board
- In office 9 July 1999 – 4 February 2009
- Preceded by: Maung Maung Gyi
- Succeeded by: Kyaw Thu

Personal details
- Born: October 1937 (age 88–89) Rangoon, British Burma
- Parent(s): U Nyun (father); Than Tin (mother)
- Education: Rangoon University; Trinity College, Cambridge; London School of Economics

Than Nyun (Burmese: သန်းညွှန့်; also spelt Than Nyunt; born October 1937) is a Burmese development economist and educationist who served as Deputy Minister of Education of Myanmar from 1994 to 1999 under of Dictator Than Shwe's cabinet. He also served as chairman of the Union Civil Service Selection and Training Board from 1999 to 2009.

== Early life and education ==
Than Nyun was born in October 1937 in Rangoon, British Burma to parent U Nyun and Than Tin. His father U Nyun was an Executive Secretary in United Nations as the head of United Nations Economic and Social Commission for Asia and the Pacific. He matriculated from St. Paul's High School, Rangoon in 1954, student ranking fifth in the country, and was awarded collegiate scholarship.

Than Nyun graduated in Economics from Rangoon University in 1958, Ph.D degree from Trinity College, Cambridge and Econ. from London School of Economics.

== Career ==
Than Nyun participated in the preparation of the 1956-60 Interim Four-Year Economic Development Plan, the recalculation of GDP estimates (1966–67) and the preparation of various legislation enacted after 1988. He was appointed as Professor of Economics at the Yangon Institute of Economics in 1978, and he became Pro-rector of the Institute in 1986, Rector in 1993. Until 1994, he was Chairman of the Board of Studies for Economics as well as chief examiner for economics for basic education high schools.

In 1994, Than Nyun was appointed as Deputy Minister of the Ministry of Education of Myanmar by Than Shwe. He served as chairman of the Union Civil Service Selection and Training Board (UCSTB) from 1999 to 2009.

Than Nyun has traveled widely in Asia, Australia, Europe and the United States of America to participate in various conferences, meetings, seminars and other events. He was deputy-leader of the Myanmar delegation to the World Summit for Social Development held in 1995 in Copenhagen. As Chairman of the CSSTB, he regularly attends the ASEAN Conference on Civil Service Matters (ACCSM) held in various ASEAN member countries. In 2005 he was appointed as Myanmar representative to the ASEAN Eminent Persons Group (EPG).

He is currently a member of the Union of Myanmar Education Committee. He is also a member of the National Convention Working Committee for the preparation of a new Constitution for Myanmar, as well as a member of the Panel of Chairmen of the National Convention, since 1993. He had served in various capacities as economist and educationist in Myanmar.
