= Bulletin of Indonesian Economic Studies =

Australian academic journal

The Bulletin of Indonesian Economic Studies (BIES) is a peer-reviewed academic journal produced at the Australian National University (ANU) in Canberra. It publishes articles and notes about the Indonesian economy. The BIES has been published three times each year since the first issue was produced in 1965.

The current editors are Firman Kartaadipoetra (ANU), Arianto Patunru (ANU), Robert Sparrow (Wageningen University and ANU), and Sarah Xue Dong (ANU).

== Background ==
In the mid-1960s Professor H. W. Arndt established the Indonesia Project at the ANU. At the time, political and economic conditions in Indonesia were very difficult and economic data were hard to obtain and of doubtful reliability. It was believed, however, that the establishment of a journal would help underpin the proposed work of the newly formed Indonesia Project in promoting international research on Indonesian economic developments.

The first issue of the BIES was published in June 1965, just a few months before the attempted coup in Jakarta on 30 September 1965 which initiated the series of political changes that led to the establishment of the New Order government under President Soeharto. Arndt's plans to establish a new project and journal did not receive strong support from his colleagues. Emeritus Professor Jamie Mackie later recalled that:

When Heinz launched the Indonesia Project and the BIES in 1964-65, the likelihood that either would succeed appeared bleak in the extreme. He mentions in A Course through Life (1985) that 'almost everyone I consulted advised against the effort.' (I can't remember whether I was one of those; I certainly would have done so if consulted, having kept a close watch on economic developments in Indonesia over the previous eight years.) ... But Heinz went ahead, and by dint of sheer audaciousness, ... perseverance and persuasiveness, he pulled it off.

The journal has been published continuously since then. BIES and the Indonesia Project is now housed within the Arndt–Corden Department of Economics at the Australian National University.

== Links with Indonesia ==
The editorial board of the BIES has always supported an active policy of working in close partnership with Indonesian colleagues. A local copy edition of BIES is published in Indonesia and is distributed by the Jakarta-based Centre for Strategic and International Studies.

Well-known Indonesian scholars and public policy makers who have worked with the project since the mid-1960s include Professor Armida Alisjahbana, Professor Boediono, Dr Hadi Soesastro, Professor Anwar Nasution, Dr Muhamad Chatib Basri, Professor Mari Pangestu, Professor Panglaykim, Professor Mubyarto, Professor Mohamad Sadli, Dr Sri Mulyani Indrawati, and Dr Thee Kian Wie.

== Contents ==
Each issue of the journal contains:

- A "Survey of Recent Developments." These surveys, written three times each year, provide a detailed coverage of all of the main economic developments in Indonesia since 1965.
- A wide range of other economic articles relating to all main aspects of economic developments in Indonesia.
- Book reviews and other notes on research carried out on the Indonesian economy.

The journal is ranked as a leading journal on Indonesian economics, development and areas studies. The impact factor in 2021 was 3.269.

Main articles

In April 2023, the "most read" article was Susan Olivia, John Gibson & Rus'an Nasrudin, "(Indonesia in the Time of Covid-19". The "most cited" article was Fitria Fitrani, Bert Hofman & Kai Kaiser "Unity in diversity? The creation of new local governments in a decentralising Indonesia "

In April 2020, the "most read" article was Thomas Power (ANU), "Jokowi's Authoritarian Turn and Indonesia's Democratic Decline".

The "most cited" article was Eve Warburton (National University of Singapore), "Jokowi and the New Developmentalism".

The Taylor & Francis Online website provides information on the contents of recent issues.

== Editors of the BIES ==
BIES editors have been:

- 1965-1982: H.W. Arndt and 1968-1983 Ruth Daroesman (assistant editor)
- 1983-1985: Anne Booth, Peter McCawley and R.M. Sundrum (joint editors) and 1983-1987 Anna Weidemann (assistant editor)
- 1985-1990: Anne Booth and 1988-2012 Liz Drysdale (assistant editor)
- 1990-1998: Hal Hill
- 1998-2011: Ross McLeod
- 2012-2015: Pierre van der Eng and 2012-2017 Ben Wilson (managing editor)
- 2015-2018: Blane Lewis, Arianto Patunru, Robert Sparrow (joint editors) and Ben Wilson (managing editor).
- 2018-2025: Blane Lewis (until 2023), Firman Kartaadipoetra (from 2023), Arianto Patunru, Robert Sparrow, Sarah Xue Dong (joint editors) and Sean Muir (managing editor).
- 2025-ongoing: Firman Kartaadipoetra, Arianto Patunru, Robert Sparrow, Sarah Xue Dong (joint editors) and Rani Kerin (managing editor).

== Financial support ==
The BIES receives financial support from the Department of Foreign Affairs and Trade of the Australian Government, the Arndt-Corden Department of Economics at the ANU, and the Australian National University.
