= United Nations Asian and Pacific Training Centre for Information and Communication Technology for Development =

The United Nations Asian and Pacific Training Centre for Information and Communication Technology for Development (UN-APCICT) aims to improve, for the region of Asia and Pacific, information and communications technology (ICT) knowledge for long-term economic growth and sustainable development of the region. Opened in 2006, and located in Songdo Techno Park in Incheon, Republic of Korea, the centre is Asia's first training centre for Information Communication Technology for Development. UN-APCICT is established by the United Nations Economic and Social Commission for Asia and the Pacific (UNESCAP).
