= Art for All Foundation =

Thai foundation

- Type: non-profit
- Chairman: Dr. Channarong Pornrungroj
- 1st Vice-chairman: Prasong Ongpreechakul, The United Nations (ESCAP)
- 2nd Vice-chairman: Associate Professor Dr. Nantarika Chansue, The Faculty of Veterinary Medicine, Chulalongkorn University
- Treasurer, Secretary: Darunee Dharmapodon, Office of the National Cultural Commission
- Affiliations: United Nations Economic and Social Commission for Asia and the Pacific
- Website: www.artforall.or.th

The Art for All Foundation and Center is a non-profit Thai organization sponsored by the United Nations Economic and Social Commission for Asia and the Pacific (ESCAP), Thailand's Commission on Higher Education, Ministry of Culture and Chulalongkorn University that conducts programs for youths with disabilities and other disadvantaged groups such as indigenous hill tribe children as well as prison inmates.

== History ==
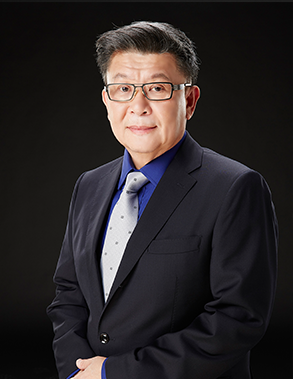
Channarong Pornrungroj

In 1997, Channarong Pornrungroj, the former Dean of the Faculty of Fine and Applied Arts at Chulalongkorn University started an art program for disadvantaged and disabled children. “Art for All” uses art as a vehicle for developing the skills and talents of both disabled and non-disabled individuals. In 2007, the Art for All Foundation partnered with the Faculty of Fine and Applied Arts of Thailand's largest university, Chulalongkorn University, creating a campus office known as the Art for All Center. Chulalongkorn University prematurely pulled funding for the Art for All Center's 3-year contract due to accounting and reporting irregularities. The University is no longer associated with Art for All.

Program volunteers, in conjunction with gifted and average children along with the blind, deaf and physically or mentally impaired all take part in a diverse range of activities. They range from musical, visual and mixed media, dance, drama to literature experiences.

== Activities ==
The Art for All program offers and conducts a diverse array of activities where both mainstream and disadvantaged young people learn to work cooperatively together. They range from weekend art education exchange sessions to the larger annual, regional and indigenous Hilltribe Art for All Camps as well as one for prisoners facing life and death sentences.

Art for All also organizes art exhibitions, workshops, hosts the international art education model group as well as conducts research and publishing an annual that incorporates leading research papers related to art, education and the underprivileged.

== International Education Model and Research Forum ==
The Art for All international program brings together key researchers and program representatives to present their current papers in an exchange forum about the disabled art education programs in their own country.

- The United Nations in 2002 selected the Art for All program to be exhibited in Australia and Japan.
- Thailand's 2007 international model Art for All program focused on its ASEAN neighbors and had 40 representatives from Bhutan, Brunei, Cambodia, Indonesia, Lao PDR, Malaysia, Myanmar, Philippines, South Korea and Vietnam participate.

== External resources ==
- Art for All Center:
  - Thai: https://web.archive.org/web/20090528081354/http://www.artforall.or.th/artforallcenter/index.htm
- Art for All Foundation:
  - English: https://web.archive.org/web/20100914162040/http://www.artforall.or.th/Eng/index.htm
  - Thai: https://web.archive.org/web/20090423071313/http://www.artforall.or.th/index.htm
- Art for All 2 Malaysia: https://web.archive.org/web/20110728033434/http://www.ytlcommunity.com/commnews/shownews.asp?newsid=5337
