= Asian Studies Association of Australia =

Peak body of university experts and educators

The Asian Studies Association of Australia (ASAA) is the peak body of university experts and educators on Asian Studies in Australia.

== History ==
The Asian Studies Association of Australia (ASAA) was established in 1976. Wang Gungwu was instrumental in its foundation.

== Description and governance ==
the ASAA promotes and supports the study of Asia in Australian universities and knowledge of Asia among the broader community.

Membership is primarily drawn from the university sector and includes academics and students engaged in teaching or research on Asia across a wide range of disciplines, including language teaching. The ASAA takes a strong interest in promoting knowledge about Asia in schools and in contributing to state and Commonwealth government policies related to Asia.

The ASAA is administered by the Executive, which consists of the President, Vice-President, Secretary, Treasurer, Asian Studies Review Editor, and Publications Officer. The Council comprises the members of the Executive, one member each representing five regions of Asia as well as a Postgraduate Representative, Library Representative, Women's Forum Representative, Conference Representative and Teacher's Representative. Executive and Council members are elected by secret ballot every two years.

== Activities and publications ==
In addition to hosting a biennial national conference, the ASAA facilitates a range of publications. The ASAA's flagship journal is the Asian Studies Review, a multidisciplinary journal of contemporary and modern Asia. The ASAA's flagship blog is Asian Currents, which aims to connect Australia's academic experts on Asia with journalists, policymakers, business people, artists and other educators. The ASAA also publishes four monograph series in collaboration with international publishing houses.

The ASAA is active in making submissions to governments and universities on matters relating to Asian studies, the professional interests of its members, tertiary and secondary education about Asia, and Asia-Australia relations. Periodically, the ASAA commissions a review into the state of Asian studies education in Australian universities. One such report published in 2002, 'Maximizing Australia's Asia Knowledge', argued for increased government investment in Asian Studies.

In 2022, the ASAA launched a new report "Australia's Asia Education Imperative: Trends in the Study of Asia and Pathways for Reform", authored by Edward Aspinall and Melissa Crouch.

== Grants and awards ==
The ASAA offers a wide range of grants, prizes and awards to recognise and support scholarship on Asia.

- The John Legge Prize is awarded annually for the best thesis in Asian studies completed at an Australian university. The ASAA Event Grant funds events related to Asian studies in Australia biennially.
- The Wang Gungwu Prize is awarded annually for the best article in the Asian Studies Review.
- The Reid Prize is awarded for the most significant book contributing to the understanding of Asia. Other prizes include the Postdoctoral Writing Grant and Early and Mid-Career Book Prizes.

== Past presidents ==
The following have served as ASAA presidents:

- 1976–78 John Legge
- 1979–80? Wang Gungwu
- 1981–2 Anthony Low
- 1983–4 Stephen FitzGerald
- 1985–6 Jamie Mackie
- 1987–8 & 1989–90 Elaine McKay
- 1991–92 John Ingleson
- 1993–94 Colin Mackerras
- 1995–96 Beverly Hooper
- 1997–98 Anthony Reid
- 1999–2000 Robert Elson
- 2001–02 Tessa Morris-Suzuki
- 2003–04 Robin Jeffrey
- 2005–06 Robert Cribb
- 2007–08 Michael Leigh, replaced by Robert Cribb
- 2009–10 Kathryn Robinson
- 2011–12 Purnendra Jain
- 2013–14 Louise Edwards
- 2017–18 Kent Anderson
- 2019–20 Edward Aspinall
- 2021–22 Kate McGregor
- 2023–24 Melissa Crouch
- 2025–26 David Hundt
