= Diennaryati Tjokrosuprihatono =

Indonesian development psychologist

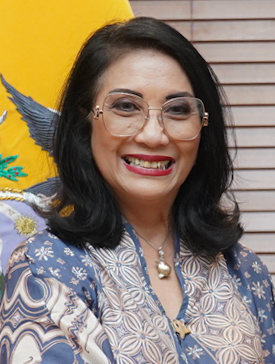
- Tjokrosuprihatono in 2019

Indonesian Ambassador to Ecuador
- In office 13 January 2016 – 14 September 2020
- President: Joko Widodo
- Preceded by: Saut Maruli Tua Gultom
- Succeeded by: Agung Kurniadi

Personal details
- Born: 3 January 1954 (age 72) Paris, France
- Party: NasDem Party
- Spouse: Tjokro Suprihatono (m. 1977)
- Children: 4
- Education: University of Indonesia (Drs, M.Psi.)

Diennaryati Tjokrosuprihatono (born 3 January 1954) is an Indonesian developmental psychologist, academic administrator, and diplomat most known for her advocacy on early childhood education in Indonesia. She was also Ambassador of Indonesia to Ecuador between 2016 and 2020.

== Early life ==
Diennaryati was born on 3 January 1954 in Paris as the daughter of Mochammad Dimmyati Moesanip, a career diplomat, and Zubaeda Thamrin. His grandfather from the mother's side was Mohammad Husni Thamrin, former deputy mayor of Jakarta and member of the Volksraad who was named as a National Hero of Indonesia in 1964.

Diennaryati began her education at a British Council-owned kindergarten in Baghdad from 1959 to 1960 and elementary school from 1960 until reaching third grade in 1962. She then moved to Bogor, where she studied at the Regina Pacis elementary school from 1962 to 1965. She completed her junior high school and high school education in 1968 and 1972. As a student, Diennaryati joined the school's choir, dance club, and student council.

Upon finishing high school, Diennaryati began studying psychology at the University of Indonesia. At her third semester, she joined Seto Mulyadi's experimental kindergarten as a teacher. She was also active in student executive council, becoming the head of the arts department in the faculty's student council and the deputy head of the art department in the university's student council. She graduated with a bachelor's degree in psychology in 1978. She later continued her master's studies in psychology at the University of Indonesia and received her master's degree in 1990.

== Career ==
Diennaryati began her career teaching at the John Robert Powers school. She began teaching psychology as a permanent lecturer at her alma mater in 1985 and became a policy consultant to agencies such as the Department of Education and Culture, National Family Planning Coordinating Board, Department of Health, and the Langkahku home education entertainment. She was also the editor of the dream (cita-cita) column in Pertiwi, a women's magazine.

From 1997 to 2004, Diennaryati was the deputy dean of the psychology faculty responsible for development, research, and cooperation. Diennaryati was responsible for establishing a joint degree program between the faculty and the University of Queensland, which began since 2000. Students enrolled in the program received a psychology degree from both the University of Indonesia and University of Queensland. In honor of developing the program, Diennaryati became an adjunct professor at the University of Queensland and received an award from Australia's department of education.

Around this period, the university was undergoing a transition from a directly owned government agency into a self-funded, autonomous, higher education institute. To allow the university's effort in searching funds for itself, the UI Entrepreneurship Management and Development Agency was established, with Diennaryati as one of its executive secretaries. Diennaryati also became the university's coordinator for public relations, where she was involved in managing the flow of information to UI internals and medias through banners, newsletters, advertisements and public service announcements, as well as setting up CCTVs in the rector election debate site to allow journalists and UI internals to follow the rector election real-time.

After 2002, the amount of deputy deans in the faculty was reduced from four to two. Diennaryati became the second deputy dean for non-academic affairs, serving from 2004 to 2008. In 2008, Diennaryati established the Makara Children's Development Park, a childcare facility for UI staff to leave their children.

== Political and diplomatic career ==
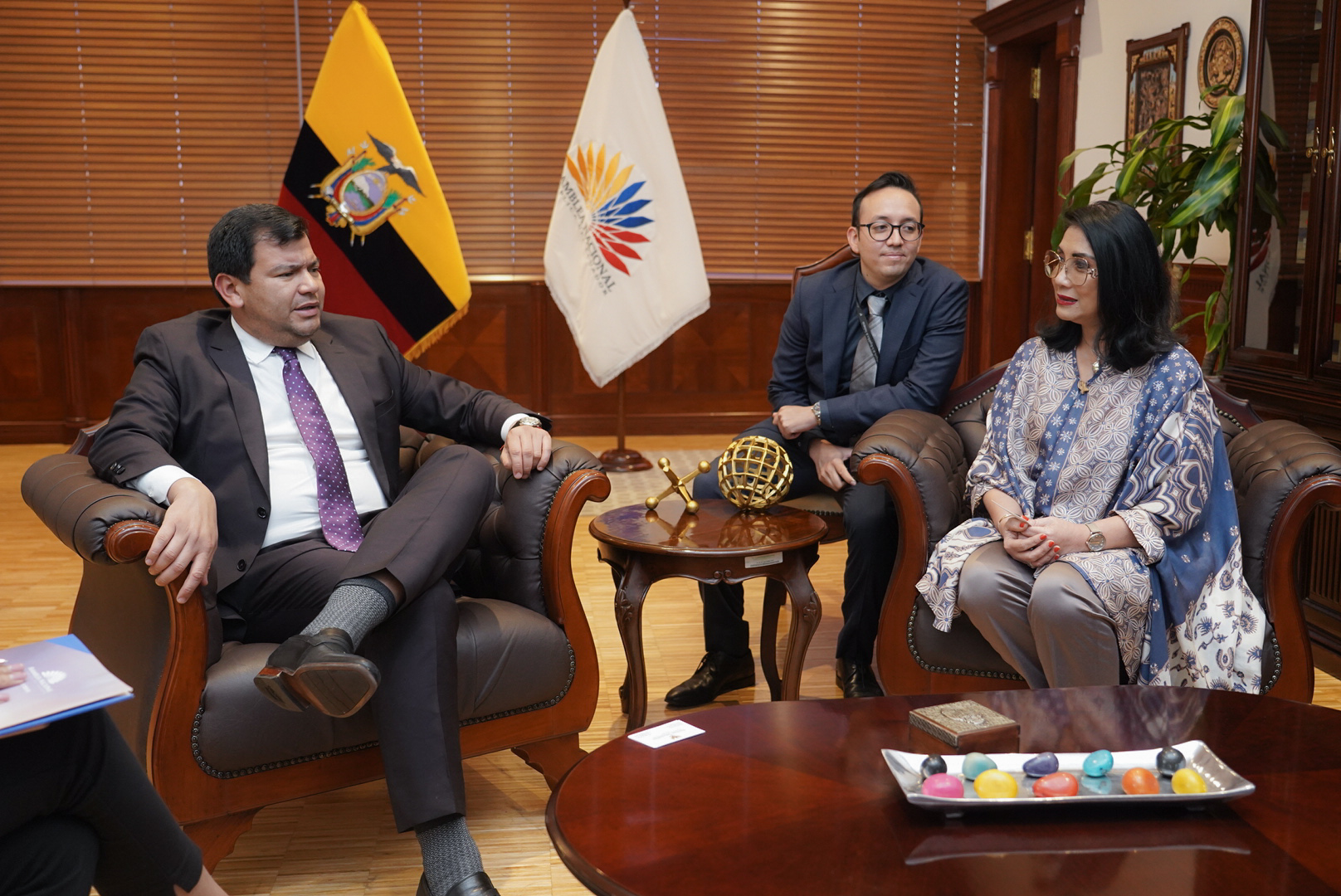
Diennaryati with President of the National Assembly César Litardo in October 2019.

In 2013, Diennaryati ran for the House of Representatives from the Nasdem Party, representing the Jakarta II electoral district. Although she became the party's most voted candidate in the electoral district with 10,212 votes, the party failed to pass the electoral threshold for the district. After failing to secure a seat in the House of Representative, President Joko Widodo nominated her for the ambassador to Ecuador in early August 2015. She was approved by the 1st commission of the House of Representatives and was installed on 13 January 2016. She presented her credentials to the Vice President of Ecuador on 20 April 2016.

Diennaryati was Indonesia's second ambassador in the country, as an embassy has just been established in 2010. According to her, at the start of her career, Indonesia was largely unknown in the country. The Indonesian diaspora in the country at that time numbered 59 people, which mostly consists of local and home staffs of the embassy and missionaries.

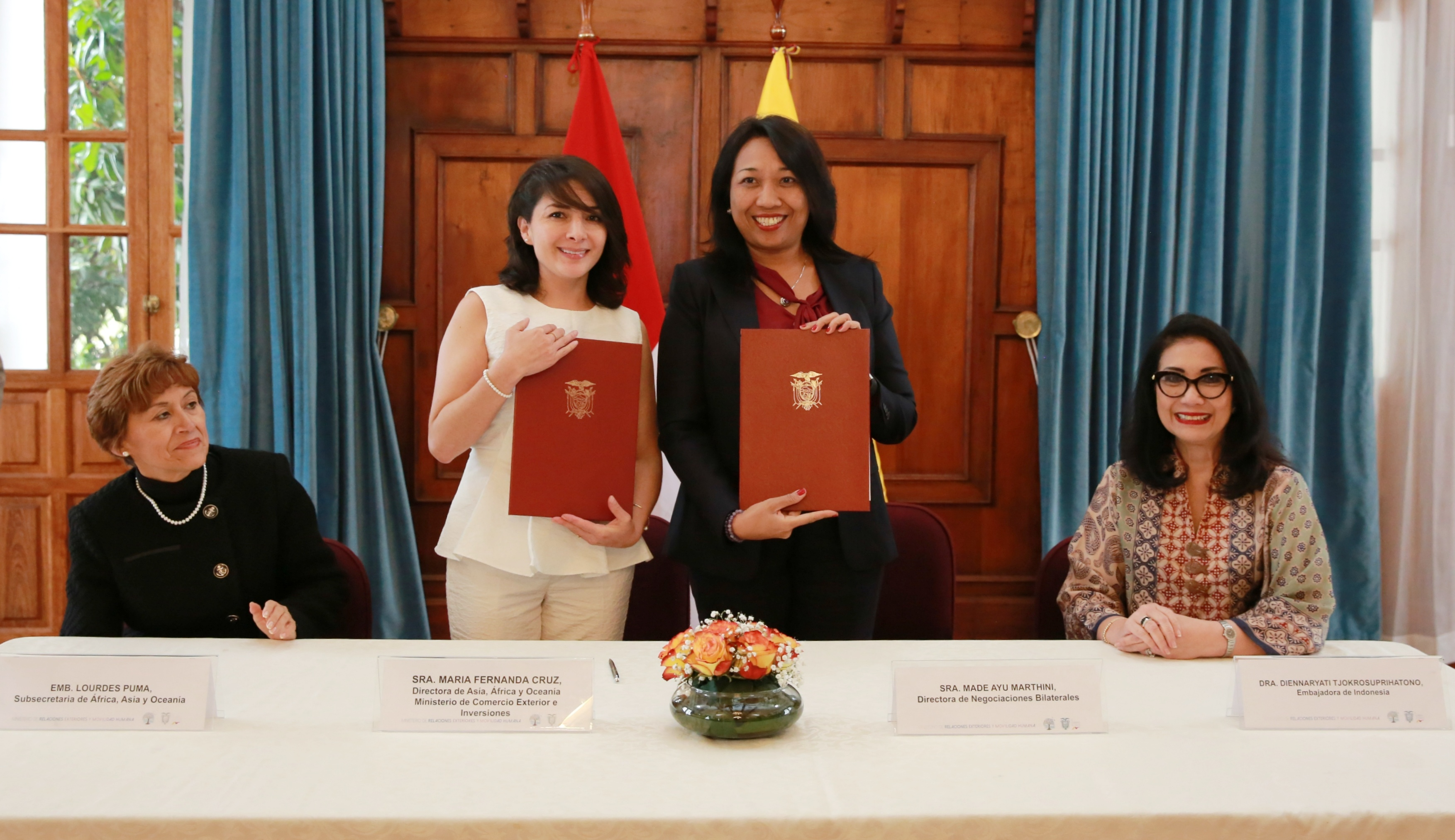
Diennaryati (right) with trade ministry director of bilateral negotiation Ni Made Ayu Marthini at the first Indonesia-Ecuador Working Group on Trade and Investment in December 2018

Diennaryati focused on cultural diplomacy to strengthen Indonesia's rapport with Ecuador, introducing Indonesian culture through culinary and art festivals. In December 2018, both countries held its first bilateral Working Group on Trade and Investment to discuss increasing cooperation on trade and investment. For her efforts in promoting Ecuador-Indonesia relations, Diennaryati received the Eloy Alfaro Award in 2018 and the Golden World Award in 2019 from the Union of Ecuador Journalists. Diennaryati ended her tenure on 14 September 2020 with career diplomat Agung Kurniadi as her replacement.

== Later life ==
Two years after the end of her tenure as ambassador, Diennaryati was appointed as the fourth deputy rector of the Pancasila University, responsible for cooperation, law, public relations, and ventures. She assumed office on 13 October 2022. On 2 September 2024, the amount of deputy rectors in the university was reduced from four to two. Diennaryati's post was abolished, and she was appointed to the newly established office of university secretary.

== Personal life ==
Diennaryati married Tjokro Suprihatono, former security chief of Regulatory Agency for Upstream Oil and Gas, in 1977. Tjokro Suprihartono is the son of former Jakarta governor Tjokropranolo. The couple has four children.
