= United Nations Conference Centre =

United Nations Conference Centre may refer to:

- United Nations Conference Centre (Addis Ababa) in Ethiopia, administered by UNECA
- United Nations Conference Centre (Bangkok) in Thailand, administered by UNESCAP
