= Slaves of the Emperor =

2023 book by David C. Porter

Slaves of the Emperor: Service, Privilege, and Status in the Qing Eight Banners
- Author: David C. Porter
- Language: English
- Subject: Eight Banners; Qing dynasty
- Genre: History
- Publisher: Columbia University Press
- Publication date: December 2023
- Media type: Print and e-book
- Pages: 352
- ISBN: 978-0-231-21277-9 (paperback)
- LC Class: DS754.15 .P67 2023
- Website: cup.columbia.edu/book/slaves-of-the-emperor/9780231559553/

Slaves of the Emperor: Service, Privilege, and Status in the Qing Eight Banners is a 2023 history book by David C. Porter, published by Columbia University Press. The book examines the Eight Banners of the Qing dynasty.

== Reception ==
Asian Studies Review reviewer Joel Wing-Lun praised the book for offering "an insightful new perspective on the Qing eight banners" and liked how the author bolsters his position through "vivid examples of boundary maintenance and transgression from Manchu- and Chinese-language archives". Inner Asia reviewer Christopher P. Atwood said the book was "a convincing challenge to the purely ethnic interpretation of the Eight Banner system".
