= Asian studies =

Study of culture and history of continental Asia

Asian studies is the term used usually in North America and Australia for what in Europe is known as Oriental studies. The field is concerned with the Asian people, their cultures, languages, history and politics. Within the Asian sphere, Asian studies combines aspects of sociology, history, cultural anthropology, cultural studies, and many other disciplines to study political, cultural and economic phenomena in Asian traditional and contemporary societies. Asian studies form a field of post-graduate study in many universities.

It is a branch of area studies, and many Western universities combine Asian and African studies in a single faculty or institute, like SOAS in London. It is often combined with Islamic studies in a similar way. The history of the discipline in the West is covered under Oriental studies.

The International Institute for Asian Studies (IIAS) only considers Asia to the east of the Indus River in its scope of "Asian Studies".

== Branches ==
- South Asian studies (Indology)
  - Bengal studies
  - Dravidian studies
    - Tamilology
  - Pakistan studies
  - Sindhology
- Southeast Asian studies
  - Filipinology (Philippine studies)
  - Thai studies
  - Vietnamese studies
  - Burma studies
  - Indonesian studies
- East Asian studies
  - Sinology (Chinese studies)
  - Taiwan studies
  - Japanese studies
    - Ainu studies
    - Okinawan studies
    - Ryukyuan studies
  - Jurchen studies
  - Khitan studies
  - Korean studies
  - Manchurology
  - Mongolian studies
  - Tangutology
  - Tibetology (Tibetan studies)
  - Uyghur studies
- West Asian studies
  - Jewish studies
  - Iranian studies
- Central Asian studies
  - Turkology
- Semitic studies
  - Assyriology
  - Aramaic studies
  - Arabic studies
  - Hebraic studies
- Jewish studies (often overlapping with Middle Eastern studies)
- Islamic studies (often overlapping with Middle Eastern and Central Asian studies)
- Middle Eastern studies or Near Eastern studies

== Academic journals ==
Name	Established	Behalf	Publisher
The Journal of Asian Studies	1941	Association for Asian Studies	Duke University Press
Modern Asian Studies	1967	University of Cambridge; Committee of Directors at the Centre of South Asian Studies	Cambridge University Press
Critical Asian Studies	1967	Committee of Concerned Asian Scholars	Taylor & Francis
Asian Studies Review	1977	Asian Studies Association of Australia	Taylor & Francis
International Journal of Asian Studies	2004	Institute for Advanced Studies on Asia, University of Tokyo	Cambridge University Press
Asian Survey	1932	Institute of East Asian Studies, University of California, Berkeley	University of California Press

== See also ==
- Black and Asian Studies Association
- Asia Society
- Asian American Writers Workshop
