= ASEAN Eminent Persons Group =

The ASEAN Eminent Persons Group (EPG) was a group of prominent citizens from the Association of Southeast Asian Nations (ASEAN) member countries, tasked to create the ASEAN Charter. The group was formed on 12 December 2005 via the 11th ASEAN Summit Declaration in Kuala Lumpur, Malaysia.

The mandate of the group was to examine and review ASEAN's structure, areas of cooperation, principles and goals contained in agreements, treaties and declarations over the previous 38 years, and to provide ASEAN leaders with policy guidelines on the drafting of the ASEAN Charter. The group was to consider an agenda including:

- Political and security (the ASEAN Security Community)
- Economic and finance (the ASEAN Economic Community)
- Functional (the ASEAN Socio-Cultural Community)
- External relations, bilaterally and inter-regionally
- Narrowing the development gap among ASEAN member-states, in the context of the ASEAN Initiative for ASEAN Integration (IAI), and the UN's Millennium Development Goals (MDGs)
- ASEAN structure, including decision-making process, administrative modalities, sources of funds, working methods, cross-sectoral coordination, conduct of meetings, documentation of meetings, roles of the Secretary-General and the ASEAN Secretariat

The group recommended key elements of an ASEAN Charter, including:

- Vision of ASEAN beyond 2020
- Nature, principles, and objectives of ASEAN
- Membership of ASEAN
- Areas for enhanced ASEAN cooperation and integration
- Narrowing the development gap among ASEAN member countries
- Organs of ASEAN and their functions and working methods
- ASEAN administrative structure (mechanisms, roles of the secretary-general and ASEAN Secretariat)
- Legal personality of ASEAN
- Conflict resolution mechanisms
- External relations

== The EPG report ==
In December 2006, at the twelfth ASEAN Summit in Cebu, Philippines, the ASEAN EPG endorsed a report building on "ASEAN Vision 2020" as guidance for the new charter. The report contains observations, recommendations, and recommended draft language for the new charter.

- First, to strengthen ASEAN regional solidarity and resilience, the EPG supports the "promotion of ASEAN's peace and stability through the active strengthening of democratic values, good governance, rejection of unconstitutional and undemocratic changes of government, the rule of law including international humanitarian law, and respect for human rights and fundamental freedoms." as one of the inclusion of recommendations of the several fundamental principles and objectives of its report.
- Second, the EPG suggests that as ASEAN economies are becoming more inter-linked, greater political commitment is needed. The report encouraged ASEAN leaders to meet more often to give greater political impetus to ASEAN community building.
- Third, it points out that ASEAN requires substantial resources to ensure that ASEAN member-states can grow collectively without development gaps.
- Fourth, member-states need to "take obligations seriously". The EPG recommends "Dispute Settlement Mechanisms (DSM) be established in all fields of ASEAN cooperation which should include compliance monitoring, advisory, consultative as well as enforcement mechanisms."
- Fifth, it encourages strengthening the ASEAN Secretariat as the scope of ASEAN activities widens. Furthermore, it recommends that ASEAN should consider alternative methods of decision-making, such as voting, when consensus cannot be reached.
- Sixth, in order to improve ASEAN's image, it recommends cultivating "ASEAN as a people-centred organisation and to strengthen the sense of ownership and belonging among its people,..."

== EPG members ==
- Brunei Darussalam
  - Pehin Dato Lim Jock Seng, Minister of Foreign Affairs and Trade
- Cambodia
  - Aun Porn Moniroth, Advisor to the Prime Minister and Chairman of the Supreme National Economic Council of Cambodia
- Indonesia
  - Ali Alatas, former Minister for Foreign Affairs
- Laos
  - Khamphan Simmalavong, former Deputy Minister of Commerce
- Malaysia
  - Tan Sri Musa Hitam, former Deputy Prime Minister - Chairman of the EPG
- Myanmar
  - Than Nyun, former Deputy Minister of Education and Chairman of the Union Civil Service Selection and Training Board
- Philippines
  - Fidel V. Ramos, former President of the Philippines, former Secretary of National Defense, Chairman of the Boa'o Forum of Asia
- Singapore
  - S. Jayakumar, Deputy Prime Minister, Coordinating Minister for National Security and Minister for Law
- Thailand
  - Kasemsamosorn Kasemsri, former Deputy Prime Minister and Minister of Foreign Affairs
- Vietnam
  - Nguyen Manh Cam, former Deputy Prime Minister and Minister of Foreign Affairs
