= Auguste Soesastro =

Indonesian fashion designer (born 1981)

- Born: August 10, 1981 (age 44); Jakarta, Republic of Indonesia
- Education: University of Sydney; Australian National University; École de la chambre syndicale de la couture parisienne, Paris
- Occupation: Fashion designer
- Label: Kraton

Auguste Soesastro is a fashion designer.

== Early life and education ==
Soesastro was born in Jakarta on August 10, 1981. His father was Hadi Soesastro, a leading Indonesian economist.

Soesastro lived ten years in Canberra, Australia, where he originally moved in order to attend high school. On his father's recommendation, he studied architecture at the University of Sydney, and also attended the Australian National University where he gained a degree in film and digital arts. In addition to his studies, for his last year in Australia Soesastro worked at the National Gallery of Australia as a junior curator of Indonesian art, specialising in South-Eastern Asian textiles and ethnographic arts. Afterwards, he studied fashion design at the École de la chambre syndicale de la couture parisienne in Paris, then moved back to New York, where he spent his early childhood, to work as an assistant pattern-maker for Ralph Rucci for three months.

== Career ==
In 2008 Soesastro launched his first fashion line in New York, a couture and bespoke brand titled Kraton (Indonesian for "palace"). He debuted at New York Fashion Week in February 2009. After his father's death in 2010, Soesastro moved himself and his business to Jakarta. His ready-to-wear line Kromo, was launched in 2012.

Soesastro, was invited to the Merdeka Palace to show some of his designs to the U.S. President Barack Obama and his First Lady during their state visit to Jakarta on 9 November 2010.

Soesastro describes himself as an environmentalist who insists on only using biodegradable natural textiles in his clothing, such as pineapple and water hyacinth cloths. He has said 'I think it's very important to be an advocate of the environment because I think the way we live is not sustainable enough.' His designs prominently feature locally made Indonesian textiles, including batik, handwoven and ikat textiles. He has been described as 'one of Indonesia's upstream-downstream industries that we should really support.' He makes a point to keep up with his suppliers, checking that they observe the principles of fair trade and ecological sustainability, saying 'It's important to make clothes with good karma, and good karma starts from the fibers.'
