= Pancasila economics =

Indonesian economic system

The national emblem of Indonesia contains a shield that represents Pancasila

Pancasila economics (Indonesian: Ekonomi Pancasila), also known as "Indonesian populist economics" (Indonesian: Ekonomi kerakyatan Indonesia), is an economic system which aims to reflect the five principles of Pancasila. The term "Pancasila economy" first appeared in an article by Emil Salim in 1967. Mubyarto is one of the staunchest of the Pancasila economic theorists. Mubyarto and Boediono developed it the most.

In essence, a Pancasila economy is a system that tries to avoid pendulum-like swings from one extreme (a free market economy, known in Indonesia as free fight liberalism) to the other (state socialism, especially of the Soviet kind). In simple terms, a "Pancasila economy" can be described as a market economic system with government control or a controlled market economy. A Pancasila economy can be considered an example of a mixed economy or a third way economic system.

A Pancasila economy is seen as a counterbalance to a neoclassical approach promoting individualism and free markets that is adapted the values of Indonesian society, including religious values, culture, customs and norms.

The concept of Pancasila economics was first conceived in the early days of the New Order as part of the regime's De-Sukarnoization and "cleansing of Communist, 30 September Movement and PKI remnants from Pancasila" which was aimed for what the regime claim as a "return into a pure, consequential Pancasila".

== Characteristics ==
The Pancasila economic system is based on Article 33 of the Indonesian constitution. The article calls for "collective enterprises under the principle of 'familyism' (Indonesian: kekeluargaan)", which is meant to be implemented through cooperatives, the state control of the commanding heights of the economy and of land and resources.

The five basic characteristics of the economic concept of Pancasila are:

- Cooperative development
- Commitment to equity
- Nationalist economic policy
- Centralized planning
- Decentralized implementation

The Pancasila economic system is claimed to have superiority above liberalism. Theorists claim it as "an economic system for the common people". Pancasila economic theorists also argue the system's superiority over socialism, which they claim do not recognize "individual ownership" (Indonesian: kepemilikan pribadi; the term "pribadi" is an Indonesian homonym for both "private" and "personal").

There has been much discussion about the need for a Pancasila economic system in economic development policy in Indonesia since Indonesian independence in 1945.

The principles of a Pancasila economy were mandated by the Indonesian Constitution in 1945. These include humanitarianism, economic nationalism, economic democracy and justice.

== Examples ==
B.J. Habibie embraced this economic nationalist policies, which B.J. Habibie called "Pancasila-based Market economy". Also Prabowo Subianto supports Pancasila economics. The Pancasila economics are described as the authentic third way of Indonesia, as there are older than the one of Anthony Giddens. Megawati Sukarnoputri embraced the Third Way.

== Differences to Suharto economic policies ==
While Suharto also advocated for econonomic nationalism and even developmentalism, and also protectionist (State-led economics) policies, While both Sukarno and Suharto tried to embrace pancasila economics in the end, the main differences is that besides that he embraced elements of all three economic systems, that Suharto was mainly influenced by the Berkeley Mafia which advocated for free market capitalism, due this both Mubyarto and Boediono rejected Sukarno's and Suharto's economic policies due the switch from centralization to decentralization.

== See also ==
- Emil Salim
- Indonesian economy
- Pancasila (politics)
