= Sudjiran Resosudarmo =

Indonesian geographer and teacher

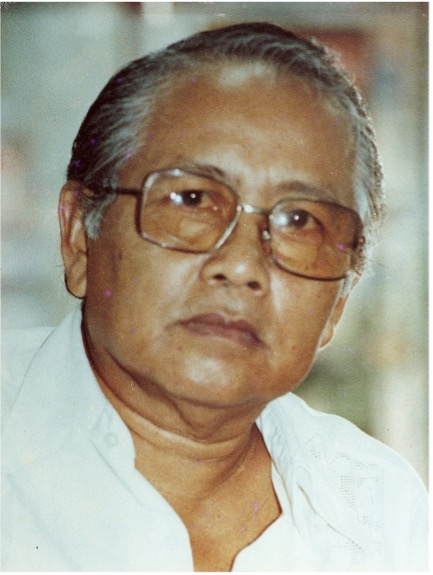

Sudjiran Resosudarmo (1920–1985) (also written as Soedjiran Resosoedarmo or Soedjiran Reksosoe-darmo) was an Indonesian geographer and teacher. He was the rector of Institut Keguruan dan Ilmu Pendidikan (IKIP) Jakarta, now known as the State University of Jakarta, from 1980 till 1984.

== Career ==
Sudjiran began his teaching career in Bali during the prolonged struggle for Indonesian independence, then moved to Jakarta, teaching in primary and secondary schools. There he met his wife, Satimah Mardjana. They raised four children: Endang Rahayu Sedyaningsih (Indonesian Minister of Health, Oct 2009 – May 2012), Marlinda Budiningsih, Budy P. Resosudarmo, and Damaryanti Suryaningsih.

In the early 1960s, Sudjiran joined the newly established teacher training institute, Institut Keguruan dan Ilmu Pendidikan (IKIP) Jakarta, which was the Faculty of Education at the Universitas Indonesia before. He devoted his career to IKIP Jakarta, becoming Professor of Geography in 1978, Dean for the Faculty of Social Science (1966–67 and 1970–77) and Rector (1980–84), as well as the government coordinator for all private universities in Jakarta (1980–82).

His career was devoted to teaching. and helping others. His research focused on climatology issues and ecological balance In 1977, he coordinated a National Education Team for Formal Education to promote environmental education throughout Indonesia.

He published several books, among others are

• Ilmu Bumi Alam. Untuk Sekolah Menengah Atas. Ganaco: Bandung, 1977.

• Atlas Dunia. Untuk Sekolah Menengah. Jambatan: Jakarta 1968 (in collaboration with Postma, T. Murtiningsih and Sukatiyar).

• Pengantar Ekologi. Bandung: Remadja Karya, 1984 (in collaboration with K. Kartawinata and A. Soegiarto).

He was a special consultant on the development of one of the first dictionaries of geology and geography terms in Indonesia: Kamus Istilah Geology dan Geography.

In 1960s, Sudjiran played an important role in developing East-West Center (EWC)’s activities in Indonesia. Despite deteriorating relations between the United States and Indonesia during that period, Sudjiran's mentoring of American students interested in Indonesia was the embodiment of EWC ideals. He helped them prepare for study in Indonesia, and, once there, his extended family welcomed them into their homes; often during trying economic times. For his contribution to the EWC, since 2019, his name has been listed in the EAST-WEST Center Wall of Honor.

== Education ==
Sudjiran Resosudarmo was born on 13 February 1920 (though formally recorded as born on 22 August 1922) in a small village in Boyolali District, Central Java, called Cepoko Sawit. As some grew up in a small village, Sudjiran's educational opportunities were limited, by the Dutch colonial government, to 3 years of elementary education (Tweede Inlandsche School or Sekolah Ongko Loro). Determined, however, he continued on to a teacher training school for "natives" (Hollandsche Indische Kweekschool or Sekolah Guru Bantu); embarking upon an academic road which led to an undergraduate degree in Jakarta and on to the East-West Center (EWC) and graduate degree programs in the United States of America.

He received his Sarjana degree in Geography Education in 1965 from Universitas Indonesia, his M.A. in geography from the University of Hawaii in 1970; followed by a Ph.D. in 1977. The title of his dissertation is Climatic Water Balance and Agricultural Production in the Northern Plain of West Java.

== Sudjiran Cup ==
Throughout his life, Sudjiran has been active in sport. While young, he was a 100-meter sprinter winning third place in the national competition in 1942. During his older days till he died on 15 February 1985, he regularly played tennis. Due to his enthusiasm in tennis and his contributions in developing IKIP Jakarta, an annual tennis competition among IKIPs throughout Indonesia from 1985 till 1996 was called the Sudjiran Cup. Since 2003, this tradition of sport competitions among teacher training universities has been replaced by the biannual LPTK Cup. There are plans to implement the Sudjiran Cup again in the near future.
