= Ni Made Ayu Marthini =

Indonesian diplomat

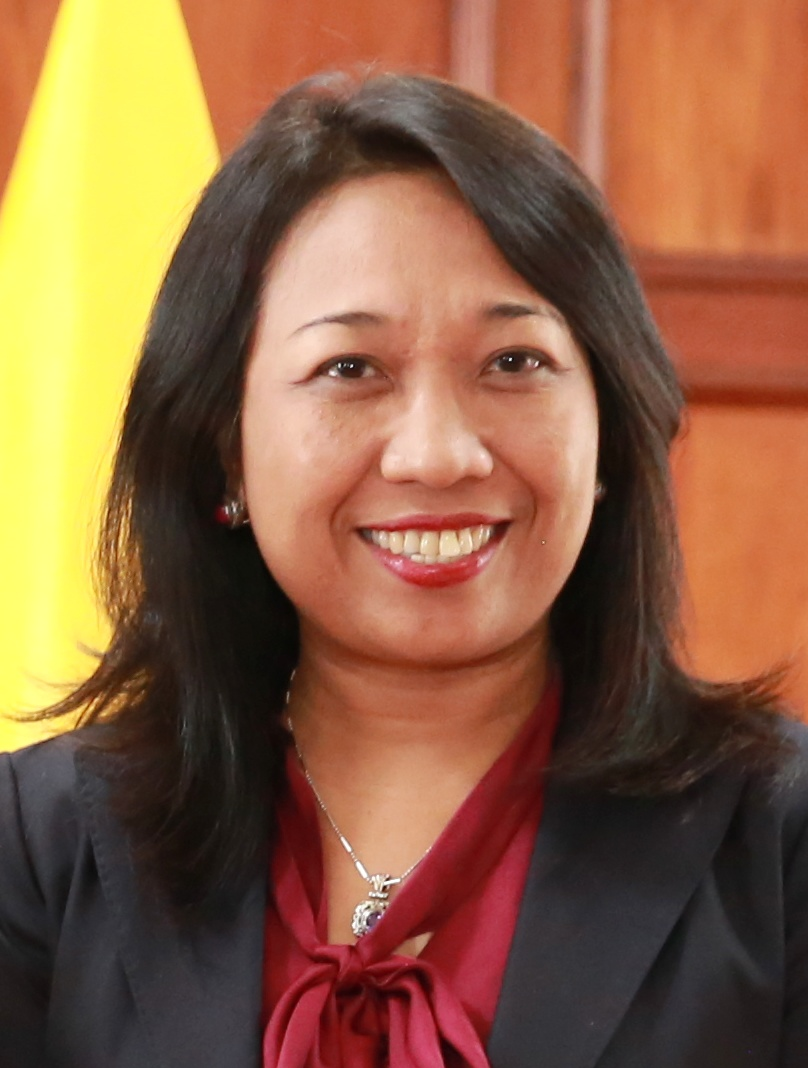

Deputy for Marketing to the Ministry of Tourism (Note: To the Ministry of Tourism and Creative Economy until 21 October 2024 and in an acting capacity from 21 October 2024 to 8 January 2025)
- Incumbent
- Assumed office 3 October 2022
- Preceded by: Nia Niscaya

Personal details
- Born: May 12, 1971 (age 54) Bali, Indonesia
- Spouse: Arnfinn Jacobsen
- Children: 1
- Education: University of Gadjah Mada (Drs.); London School of Economics (M.Sc.)

Ni Made Ayu Marthini (born 12 May 1971) is an Indonesian diplomat who is serving as the deputy for marketing in the Ministry of Tourism since 3 October 2022. She had previously occupied a number of diplomatic positions, including as the trade attaché to United States and director of bilateral negotiations.

== Education ==
Ni Made Ayu Marthini was born on 12 May 1971 in Bali, Indonesia. She pursued undergraduate studies in international relations at the Gadjah Mada University in Yogyakarta from 1990 to 1995 and is currently serving as the chairwoman of the major's alumni association until 2027. Her master's degree was obtained from the London School of Economics in 1999.

== Career ==
Ni Made began her career as a civil servant in 1996, taking on supporting roles in the foreign affairs ministry. Her first major assignment was at the Directorate of Multilateral Economic Cooperation in Directorate General of Foreign Economic Relations. This role provided her with early exposure to international economic diplomacy. In 2001, Marthini was posted as a junior diplomat to the Permanent Mission of the Republic of Indonesia to the United Nations in New York, United States. During her tenure, she was part of the Indonesian team that campaigned for Mari Elka Pangestu’s appointment as assistant secretary-general of the United Nations. As the secretary of the team, Marthini worked closely with senior Indonesian officials and learned the intricacies of international negotiations.

Following the appointment of Mari Elka Pangestu as Indonesia’s trade minister in 2004, Ni Made moved to the Ministry of Trade in 2006. Her decision was motivated by her desire to broaden her knowledge and skills under the mentorship of Mari Elka Pangestu. She served as Assistant to the Minister in the Minister’s Office for six years. She also held the position of Head of News and Publication at the Public Relations Center. Marthini was posted as trade attaché at the Indonesian Embassy in Washington, D.C., returning to diplomatic service after her earlier stint at the Ministry of Foreign Affairs.

In 2016, she was appointed director of bilateral negotiations in the trade ministry, where she led Indonesia’s trade negotiations with key partners, including the European Free Trade Association (EFTA), Australia, and Chile. As a chief negotiator, Marthini was known for her strategic approach, emphasizing the principle of being "tough on issues, soft on people". She advocated for assertiveness in defending Indonesia’s interests while maintaining respectful and constructive relationships with negotiation counterparts. Her leadership style fostered the development of young diplomats and negotiators, providing them with training and opportunities to excel in international forums. In recognition of her works, Marthini was awarded the Adhigana Award in the category of Outstanding Primary High Leadership Official at the 2021 Civil Servant Awards by the Ministry of Administrative and Bureaucratic Reform.

On 3 October 2022, Marthini assumed office as deputy for marketing at the ministry of tourism and creative economy. Her appointment followed a rigorous selection process, including assessments by the minister, deputy minister, and a panel of experts. In this role, she is responsible for promoting Indonesia’s tourism sector and creative industries, with a focus on innovative and collaborative marketing strategies. Recognizing budgetary constraints, she introduced the concept of collaborative marketing by leveraging partnerships across sectors to maximize impact without relying solely on state funding. After the ministry of tourism and creative economy was split into two, Marthini joined the tourism ministry where she retained her role in an acting capacity. She was installed as the deputy for marketing in the ministry of tourism on 8 January 2025.

== Personal life ==
Marthini is married to Arnfinn Jacobsen, a businessperson. The couple has a daughter. According to her most recent wealth report on 26 February 2024, she has a total wealth of IDR 29.1 billion (USD 3,210,903).
