= State University of Jakarta =

Public universities in Indonesia

- Universitas Negeri Jakarta
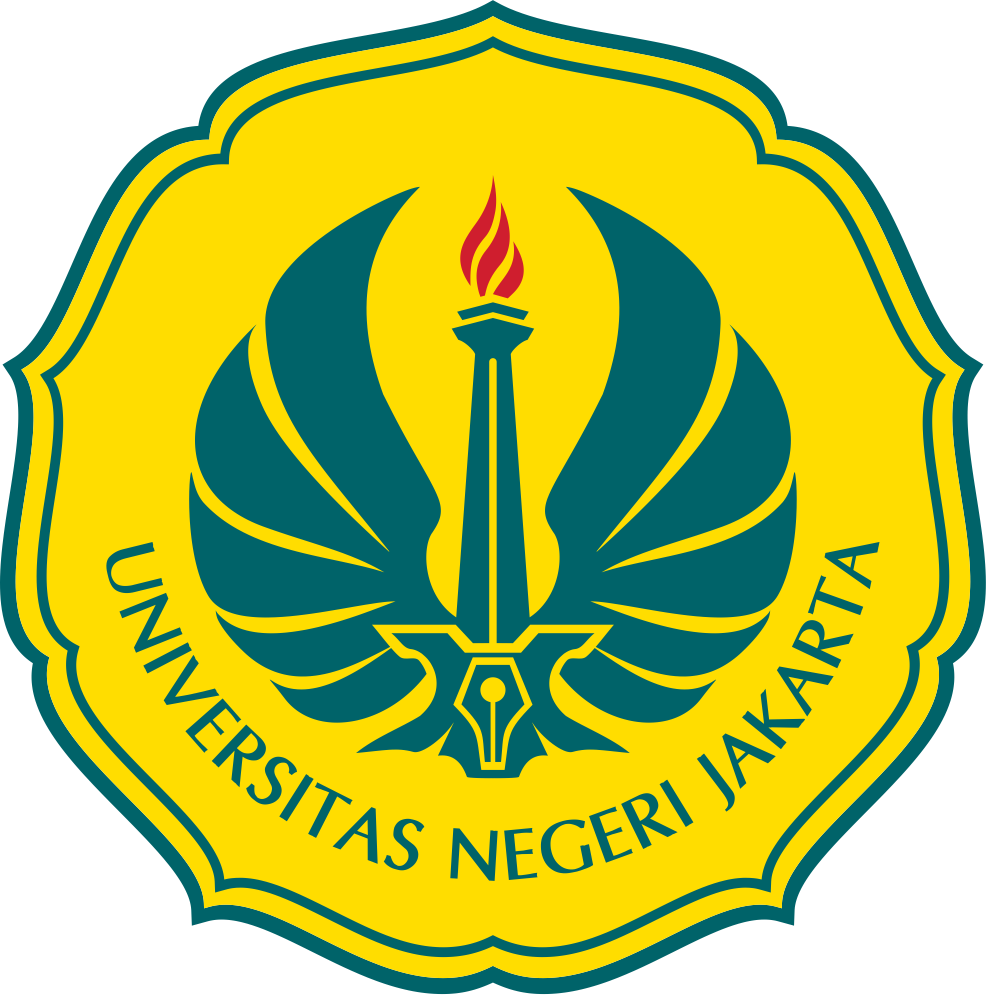
- Motto: Intelligentia-Dignitas
- Type: Public University
- Established: 16 May 1964 (as IKIP); 4 August 1999 (UNJ)
- Parent institution: Ministry of Education, Culture, Research, and Technology
- Affiliations: ASAIHL
- Rector: Prof. Dr. Komarudin, M.Si
- Students: 31,795 (2019)
- Undergraduates: 25,785 (2019)
- Postgraduates: 2,130 (2019)
- Doctoral students: 926 (2019)
- Location: Jl. Rawamangun Muka Raya, Jakarta, Indonesia; 6°11′40.2″S 106°52′43.7″E
- Campus: Urban; Campus A Rawamangun; Campus B Pemuda; Campus D Halimun; Campus E Setiabudi
- Colours: Green
- Website: unj.ac.id
- The Symbol and the Motto of State University of Jakarta

State University of Jakarta (Indonesian: Universitas Negeri Jakarta, commonly abbreviated as UNJ) is a public university in Jakarta, Indonesia. Founded in 1964 as the Jakarta Institute of Teaching and Education (IKIP Jakarta), it was later converted into a state university by the Indonesian government in 1999.

The university has four campuses in East and South Jakarta, with the main campus being located in Rawamangun. Divided into 8 faculties, the university had a graduating class of 3,906 in 2016.

== History ==
Prior to the independence of Indonesia, the Dutch East Indies had established STOVIA, initially a medical school and later expanding into multiple fields upon independence and its renaming to Universitas Indonesia. The university had multiple branches in Jakarta, Bogor, Surabaya, Makassar and Bandung, most of which eventually split into their own universities. One of these branches was the Faculty of Teaching and Education. Around 1963, there was also another institute - the Teachers' Education Institute (Institusi Pendidikan Guru), which resulted in dualism in the young country's education of teachers. Due to this, Sukarno ordered a merge between the faculty and the institute to form the Institute of Teaching and Education (Institut Keguruan dan Ilmu Pendidikan, IKIP) through a Presidential Decree. Later on, the merged body split into its own university, effective on 16 May 1964. Latief Hendraningrat, former head of the Indonesian Army's Commanders and Staff School and later a brigadier general, was appointed as the first rector and served for just a year.

In 1968, the institute established the Labschool High School (SMA Labschool) to act as a school laboratorium where teachers in training could practice their teaching and educational research could be conducted. The institute was converted into a university on 4 August 1999, and it had since expanded into teaching non-education subjects.

In 2017 the university was put under investigation for high levels of plagiarism, resulting in the removal of its previous rector by the Ministry of Research, Technology and Higher Education (Kemenristekdikti). In the same year, it was ranked 26th out from 3,244 higher educational institutes in Indonesia by Kemenristekdikti.

== Rectorate ==
=== University of Indonesia Era ===
1. Prof. Dr. R. Soegarda Poerbakawatja, Dean of FKIP University of Indonesia (1961 - 1963)
2. Prof. Dr. R. Slamet Iman Santoso, Dean of FKIP University of Indonesia (1963 - 1964)

=== IKIP Jakarta Era ===
1. Brigjen A. Latief Hendraningrat, Rector of IKIP Jakarta (1964 - 1965)
2. Prof. Dr. Maftuchah Yusuf, Head of Presidium of IKIP Jakarta (1966 - 1967)
3. Prof. Dr. Deliar Noer, M.A., Rector of IKIP Jakarta (1967 - 1971; 1971 - 1975)
4. Dr. Siswojo Hardjodipuro, Pjs. Rector of IKIP Jakarta (1975)
5. Prof. Dr. Winarno Surachmad, M.Sc., Ed., Rector of IKIP Jakarta (1975–1980)
6. Prof. Dr. Sudjiran Resosudarmo, M.A., Rector of IKIP Jakarta (1980 - 1984)
7. Prof. Dr. Conny R. Semiawan, Rector of IKIP Jakarta (1984 - 1988; 1988 - 1992)
8. Prof. Dr. A. Suhaenah Suparno, Rector of IKIP Jakarta (1992 - 1996)
9. Prof. Dr. Sutjipto, Rector of IKIP Jakarta (1997 - 1999)

=== State University of Jakarta Era ===
1. Prof. Dr. Sutjipto, Rector of State University of Jakarta (1999 - 2001; 2001 - 2005)
2. Prof. Dr. Bedjo Sujanto, M.Pd., Rector of State University of Jakarta (2005 - 2009; 2009 - 2014)
3. Prof. Dr. H. Djaali, Rector of State University of Jakarta (2014 - 2017)
4. Prof. Intan Ahmad, Ph.D., Acting (Plt) Rector of State University of Jakarta (2017 - 2019)
5. Prof. Dr. Komarudin, M.Si., Rector of State University of Jakarta (2019 - 2023)

== Students and Faculties ==
UNJ claimed to have 26,000 students as of March 2017. 3,906 students from 6 of the 8 faculties graduated from the university in September 2016, adding to an almamater of over 105,000 since the university's inception.

The university has the following faculties, in addition to a postgraduate program:

1. Faculty of Education Sciences
2. Faculty of Languages and the Arts
3. Faculty of Mathematics and Natural Sciences
4. Faculty of Social Sciences
5. Faculty of Engineering
6. Faculty of Sports Sciences
7. Faculty of Economics
8. Faculty of Psychological Education

== See also ==
- Education in Indonesia
