= Budy P Resosudarmo =

Economist (Australian National University)

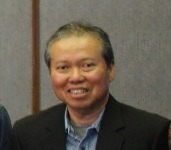
Resosudarmo in June 2021

Budy P. Resosudarmo (born 1961) is a professor in development and environmental economics at the Arndt-Corden Department of Economics, Crawford School of Public Policy, at the Australian National University (ANU). He is the head of the ANU Indonesia Project. He was the education director of the Crawford School for the 2021-2022 period and the deputy director of the ANU Poverty and Inequality Research Centre for the 2019-2023 period. Since 2022, he has been a Fellow of the Regional Science Association International.

Budy has been mostly working on development and environmental issues in Southeast Asia, particularly Indonesia. In conducting his research, he implements, among others, impact evaluation, spatial and inter-regional modelling techniques. He has been active and significantly contributing in the development of academic associations in the field of regional science and environmental economics in Southeast Asia. List of his publication can be seen at: the ANU, Google Scholar, ResearchGate, OrcId, or Scopus.

== At the ANU Indonesia Project ==
Budy joined the ANU Indonesia Project in October 2001. In 2004, he convened that year ANU's Indonesia Update Conference on issues of natural resource management. Based on papers presented in this conference, he edited a book, titled The Politics and Economics of Indonesia's Natural Resources. The book was published by ISEAS in 2005. In 2006, he organised a workshop for the Project on development and environment in Eastern Indonesia: Papua: Maluku and East Nusa Tenggara. Based on this workshop, he co-edited a book, titled: Working with Nature against Poverty: Development and Environment in Eastern Indonesia, which was published by ISEAS in 2009. In 2014, together with Premachandra Athukorala and Arianto Patunru, he co-edited a book in honor of Hal Hill, a prominent economist specializing in Southeast Asian economies, particularly Indonesia, and a former head of the ANU Indonesia Project (1986 to 1998).

From February 2009 until August 2009, Budy was the acting head of the ANU Indonesia Project. From February 2010 until February 2011, he and Chris Manning co-headed the Project; and from February 2011 until May 2017, he was the head of the ANU Indonesia Project. In 2018, he was promoted to become a professor at the ANU. He has been re-appointed as the head of the ANU Indonesia Project since July 2023.

Since joining the ANU Indonesia Project, he has been regularly giving public lectures in several Indonesian universities, such as in Universitas Indonesia, Universitas Gadjah Mada, Institut Teknologi Bandung, Universitas Padjadjaran, Universitas Airlangga, Universitas Brawidjaya and Universitas Diponegoro in Java; Universitas Syiah Kuala, Universitas Andalas and Universitas Sriwijaya in Sumatra; Universitas Lambung Mangkurat in Kalimantan, Universitas Sam Ratulangi and Universitas Hasanuddin in Sulawesi; Universitas Udayana, Universitas Pattimura and Universitas Cendrawasih in other islands of Indonesia. In 2011, together with leaders of SMERU Research Institute and LPEM-FEBUI, as well as in collaborations with researchers from other institutions and universities, he co-founded the Forum Kajian Pembangunan, a seminar series on development issues in Indonesia.

== At the Regional Science Associations ==
In 1996, Budy chaired a Working Committee that a year later formed the Indonesian Regional Science Association (IRSA). In 2000, he organised the second IRSA international conference of the Association in Jakarta. Only 14 papers were submitted to the conference at that time. Since that year, the Association has been regularly conducting its annual conferences. Throughout the years, the size of the conference has been gradually developed. By early 2010s, more than 400 papers were submitted to each IRSA conference, which only approximately half of them could be accepted. By then, IRSA conferences have become the major development conferences in Indonesia. Members of the association are mostly academics and researchers who concern with the regional development in Indonesia. He was the Vice President of IRSA from July 2009 until July 2017. Since 2001, he has been coordinating the annual IRSA book series on Regional Development in Indonesia. The list of books in the IRSA series can be found on this page. In 2024, together with Yuri Mansury, he co-edited a book in honor of Iwan Jaya Azis, a prominent Indonesian academic in the field of regional science.

Since 2001, he has been a Council member of the Pacific Regional Science Conference Organisation (PRSCO). From November 2012 to November 2013, he was the Vice President of PRSCO; and from November 2013 until November 2015, he was the President of PRSCO. From 2015, he has been an Advisory Committee member of PRSCO.

From May 2017 till December 2018, he was the President of the Regional Science Association International (RSAI). The RSAI, founded in 1954, is an international community of scholars interested in the regional impacts of national or global processes of economic and social change. With approximately 4,500 academic members, it consists of 4 superregional (Europe, North America, Latin America and the Asia-Pacific) organisations and has sections in more than 30 countries around the world. From January 2019, he has been a member of the RSAI Long-Range Planning Committee, and, from June 2022, a Fellow of Regional Science Association International.

== At the Environmental and Resource Economic Associations ==
From 1997 till 2001, Budy was part of the Economy and Environment Program for Southeast Asia (EEPSEA) research networks. In 2010, with Iwan Jaya Azis, Arianto Patunru and Lydia Napitupulu, he co-edited a book to honour Emil Salim for Emil Salim's contributions in advocating the implementation of Sustainable Development in Indonesia and around the world. From 2013 till 2016, Budy was a resource person and an Advisory Committee member of EEPSEA. In 2016, he co-founded the Economy and Environment Institute (EEI)-Indonesia, which is part of the EEPSEA network.

In 2010, he co-founded the East Asian Association of Environmental and Resource Economics (EAAERE), which then was transformed into the Asian Association of Environmental and Resource Economics (AAERE) in 2019. From the time of the Association's inception until 2023, he was a member of its board of directors. He co-convened the Association's second congress in Bandung in 2012. Additionally, he served as the vice president of EAAERE from 2012 to 2015. He held the position of president of AAERE for the term 2021-2023. He represented AAERE at the World Council of Environmental and Resource Economists Association for the 2021-2025 period.

== Personal life ==
Budy is the son of Sudjiran Resosudarmo and Satimah Mardjana. His oldest sister was Endang Rahayu Sedyaningsih, who was the Indonesian ministry of health from the end of 2009 until her death in 2012. His other two sisters are Marlinda Budiningsih and Damaryanti Suryaningsih.

Budy grew up in an area closed to the Gambir Railway Station and Jalan Batu in the central city of Jakarta, Indonesia. He spent his childhood by enrolling in a local state primary school in the area (SD Merdeka Timur, now renamed SDN Gambir 01 Pagi). He then did his junior and high school education at the Kanisius junior and high school in Jakarta. He received his sarjana degree in Electrical Engineering from Bandung Institute of Technology, masters degree in Operations Research from University of Delaware, and doctoral degree in development economics from Cornell University.

Budy is married to Ida Aju N. Pradnja, an academic working on issues of forest governance in Indonesia. The couple have two sons and a daughter.
