= Mubyarto =

Indonesian economist

Mubyarto (3 September 1938 – 24 May 2005) was an Indonesian economist. He was born in Sleman, in Yogyakarta, and became a professor of economics at Gadjah Mada University in Yogyakarta specialising in agricultural economics. He frequently wrote and spoke about challenges of agricultural development in Indonesia. Later in his career he became known for his interest in Pancasila economics and ekonomi rakyat (people's economics).

== Early career ==
Mubyarto grew up in the town of Yogyakarta. He first studied economics as a student in the Economics Faculty (Fakultas Ekonomi) at Gadjah Mada University and he was appointed as a promising junior lecturer on graduation in 1959.

Mubyarto pursued his graduate work in the United States, first earning a Master of Arts degree from Vanderbilt University in 1962. His interest in rural development gained rigour throughout his PhD program at Iowa State University where his doctoral dissertation was a study of the issue of The Elasticity of the Marketable Surplus of Rice in Indonesia.

== Work in Indonesia ==
Upon completing his PhD in the United States in 1965, Mubyarto returned to take up a post at Gadjah Mada University. At the time, economic conditions in Indonesia were very difficult and the province of Yogyakarta (the Special Region of Yogyakarta, or Daerah Istimewa Yogyakarta) was one of the poorest areas of Indonesia.

Through most of his career he regularly pointed out the issue of poverty. Related to the concern about poverty was the price of rice and its effect upon the community.

Later in his career at Gadjah Mada University, he attained the status of professor.

== Awards and recognition ==
- 1994. Bintang Jasa Utama (Star of Service, First Class, a national award from the President of Indonesia)
- 1997. Bintang Mahaputera Utama (Mahaputera Star, Third Class, a national award from the President of Indonesia)
- 1998. Satyalencana Pembangunan Koperasi (Cooperatives Development Medal, a national award from the President of Indonesia)
- 2001. Bung Hatta Award from the Bung Hatta University.
- 2017. The "Mubyarto Public Policy Forum" was established with the support of Gadjah Mada University and the Indonesia Project, Australian National University. The Inaugural keynote address at the first forum in May 2017 was given by former Indonesian Vice President Professor Boediono who spoke about "Revisiting the Problem of Development Redistribution."
- 2026. Anugerah Amerta Bakti at the Koperasi Awards 2026, presented by the Minister of Cooperatives of the Republic of Indonesia, in recognition of his pioneering work on Pancasila Economics and advocacy of cooperatives as a pillar of the national economy.

== Selected publications ==
Mubyarto and Ace Partadireja. 1968. "An economic survey of the Special region of Jogyakarta". Bulletin of Indonesian Economic Studies. No 11. October.
Mubyarto. 1969. "The sugar industry". Bulletin of Indonesian Economic Studies. V (2). July.
Mubyarto. 1970. "Economic developments in D.I. Jogjakarta". Bulletin of Indonesian Economic Studies. VI (3). November.
Mubyarto. 1971. "Estimating rice consumption: A comment". Bulletin of Indonesian Economic Studies. VII (3). November.
Mubyarto. 1975. "Masalah beras di Indonesia" ["The rice problem in Indonesia"]. Lembaga Penelitian Ekonomi FE-UGM.
Mubyarto. 1984. "Social and economic justice". Bulletin of Indonesian Economic Studies. 20 (3). December.
Mubyarto. 1995. "Ekonomi dan keadilian sosial" ["Economics and social justice"]. Aditya Media.
Mubyarto. 1996. "Ekonomi pertanian dan pedesaan" ["Agricultural and village economics"]. Aditya Media.
Mubyarto. 1999. Poverty in Vietnam, Laos and Cambodia. Jakarta: Bappenas.
Mubyarto. 2002. "Ekonomi Rakyat Indonesia". Jurnal Ekonomi Rakyat 1 (1).
Mubyarto, with Daniel W. Bromley. 2002. A development alternative for Indonesia. Yogyakarta: Gama Press.
Mubyarto. 2004. "Teknocrat dan ekonomi Pancasila" ["Technocrats and Pancasila economics"]. Pustep.
Mubyarto. 2005. A Development Manifesto: The Resilience of the Indonesian Ekonomi Rakyat during the Monetary Crisis. Jakarta: Kompas Book Publishing. ISBN 979-709-217-8
