= Rafeeuddin Ahmed =

Pakistani diplomat

- Born: October 2, 1932; Sukkur, British India
- Died: December 27, 2025 (aged 93); New York City, NY, United States
- Education: The Fletcher School of Law and Diplomacy, University of the Punjab
- Occupation: Diplomat
- Spouse: Nighat Ahmed
- Children: Zia Ahmed, Kamaluddin Ahmed

Rafeeuddin Ahmed (October 2, 1932 — December 27, 2025) was a Pakistani diplomat who served as the Under-Secretary-General of the United Nations for 21 years.

== Career ==
Rafeeuddin Ahmed started his career as a lecturer in political science at the Government College University (Faisalabad) in 1954. Then he served as an official at the Foreign Service of Pakistan.

His various roles within the United Nations started on 2 May 1970 and have included:

- Executive Secretary at the United Nations Economic and Social Commission for Asia and the Pacific (1992 – 1994)
- Under-Secretary General for Political Affairs, Trusteeship and Decolonization
- Under-Secretary General and Chef de Cabinet for the UN Secretary General, Kurt Waldheim
- Under-Secretary-General and Special Representative of the Secretary-General for Humanitarian Affairs in South-East Asia
- Secretary of the Economic and Social Council
- Under-Secretary-General and Senior Adviser to the Administrator of United Nations Development Programme

In addition to his Secretary and Under-Secretary posts, he has served as:

- Special Envoy of the Secretary-General to Secure Release of the Crew of the Russian Plane Force Landed in Kandahar by the Taliban Regime in Afghanistan
- Special Representative of the Secretary-General for the Laos-Thailand Conflict
- Special Representative of the Secretary-General for East Timor
- Special Representative of the Secretary-General for Cambodia
- Special Envoy of the Secretary-General for Myanmar
- Convenor of the Secretary-General's Task Force on Falkland Islands (Malvina) in 1982
- Principal Aide to the UN Secretary-General for the Iran hostage crisis
- Special Adviser on Iraq appointed by UN Secretary-General, Kofi Annan in 2003

== Personal life and education ==
Rafeeuddin Ahmed is an alumnus of The Fletcher School of Law and Diplomacy at Tufts University in Medford, Massachusetts, where he studied in International Economics and International Law. He has also earned an MA in Political Science from the University of Punjab in Lahore, Pakistan.

Rafeeuddin Ahmed was married to Nighat Ahmed and was father to Zia Ahmed, also a Fletcher alumnus, and Kamaluddin Ahmed, a prominent lecturer at Lahore University of Management Sciences, Pakistan.

Rafeeuddin died in December 2025. According to the UN Tourism's death notice, he is remembered for his "unwavering dedication to multilateralism and the ideals of the United Nations."
