= U Nyun =

Burmese diplomat

Sithu U Nyun
- ဦးညွှန့်
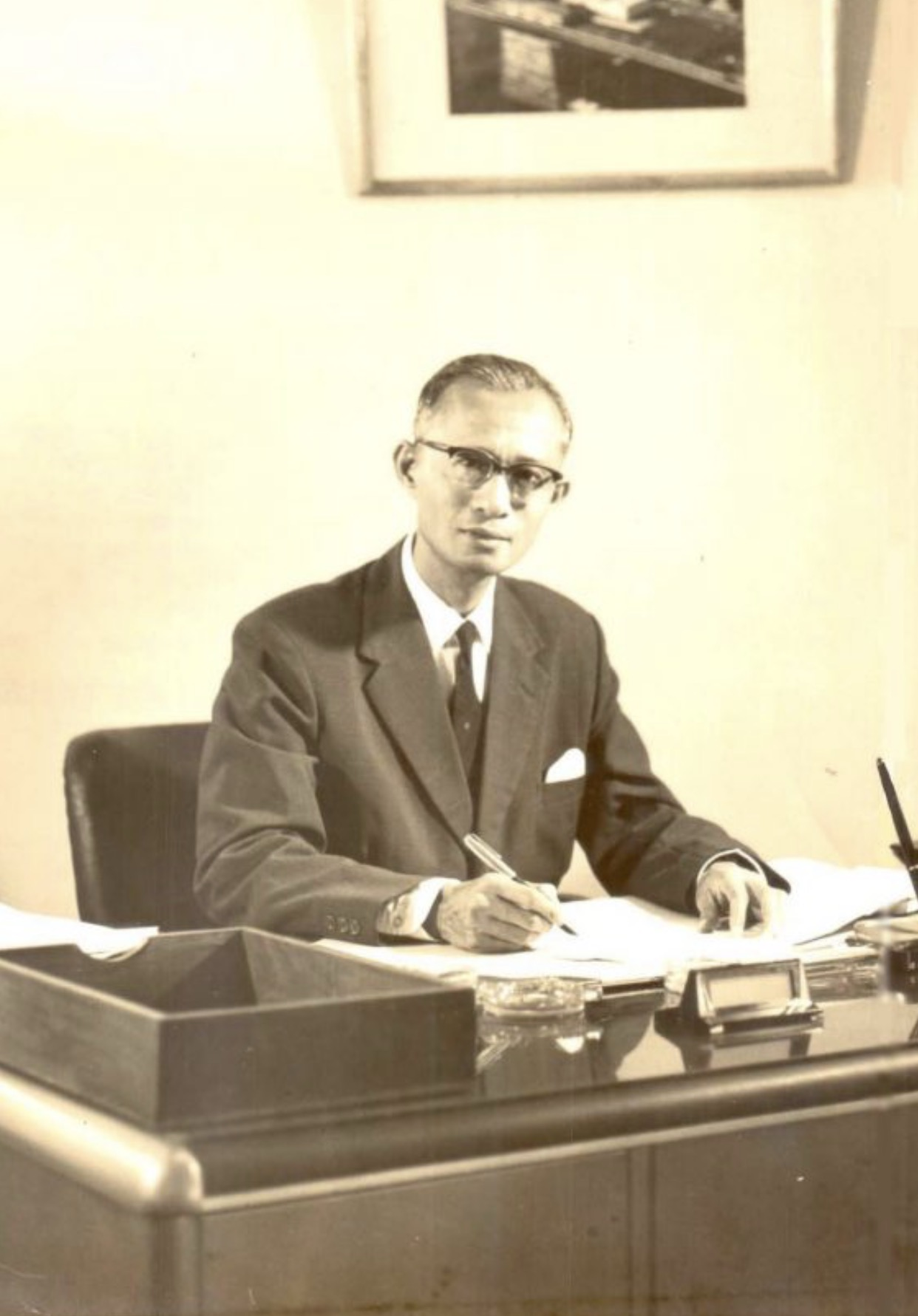
- U Nyun in United Nations office

3rd Executive Secretary of United Nations Economic and Social Commission for Asia and the Pacific
- In office 1959–1973
- Preceded by: Chakravarthi V. Narasimhan
- Succeeded by: J. B. P. Maramis

Personal details
- Born: 20 January 1910 Hpa-An, British Burma
- Died: 8 April 1996 (aged 86) Yangon, Myanmar
- Spouse: Than Tin
- Children: 4 son, 1 daughters: Aung Nyun; Than Nyun; Myo Nyun; Hla Nyun; Marie Nyun
- Parent(s): Kyuu Hlaing (father); Kyin Saing (mother)
- Education: Rangoon University; Oxford University; University of London
- Website: www.unyun.org/u-nyun/about/

Sithu U Nyun (Burmese: ဦးညွန့်; also spelt U Nyunt; 20 January 1910 – 4 April 1996) was a Burmese development economist, diplomat and intellectual who served as the 3rd Executive Secretary as the head of United Nations Economic and Social Commission for Asia and the Pacific.

== Early life ==
U Nyun was born on 20 January 1910 in Hpa-An, British Burma. He attended Basic Education High School No. 1 Thaton and graduated from Rangoon University in 1930, and also educated at Oxford University and University of London. He joined the Indian Civil Service on 4 October 1933.

== United Nations career ==
U Nyun served in the Indian Civil Service (ICS) and then as a senior civil servant in the independent Burma government, before joining the United Nations in 1953. From 1959 to 1973, he was the Under-Secretary General of the United Nations as the head of United Nations Economic and Social Commission for Asia and the Pacific (ESCAP), working directly under Secretaries-General Dag Hammarskjöld and U Thant.

U Nyunt served as the Executive Secretary and established the Mekong Development Project, Asian Highway Network, Asian Statistical Institute, Asian Industrial Development Council, Asian Development Bank, Asian Clearing Union. In 1966, he founded the Asian Development Bank, and was recognized as The Father of Asian Development Bank. In 1973, he retired from the United Nations as the head of United Nations Economic and Social Commission for Asia and the Pacific.

U Nyun was one of many trained and experienced Burmese Indian Civil Service and Burmese Civil Service officers at the time of independence.

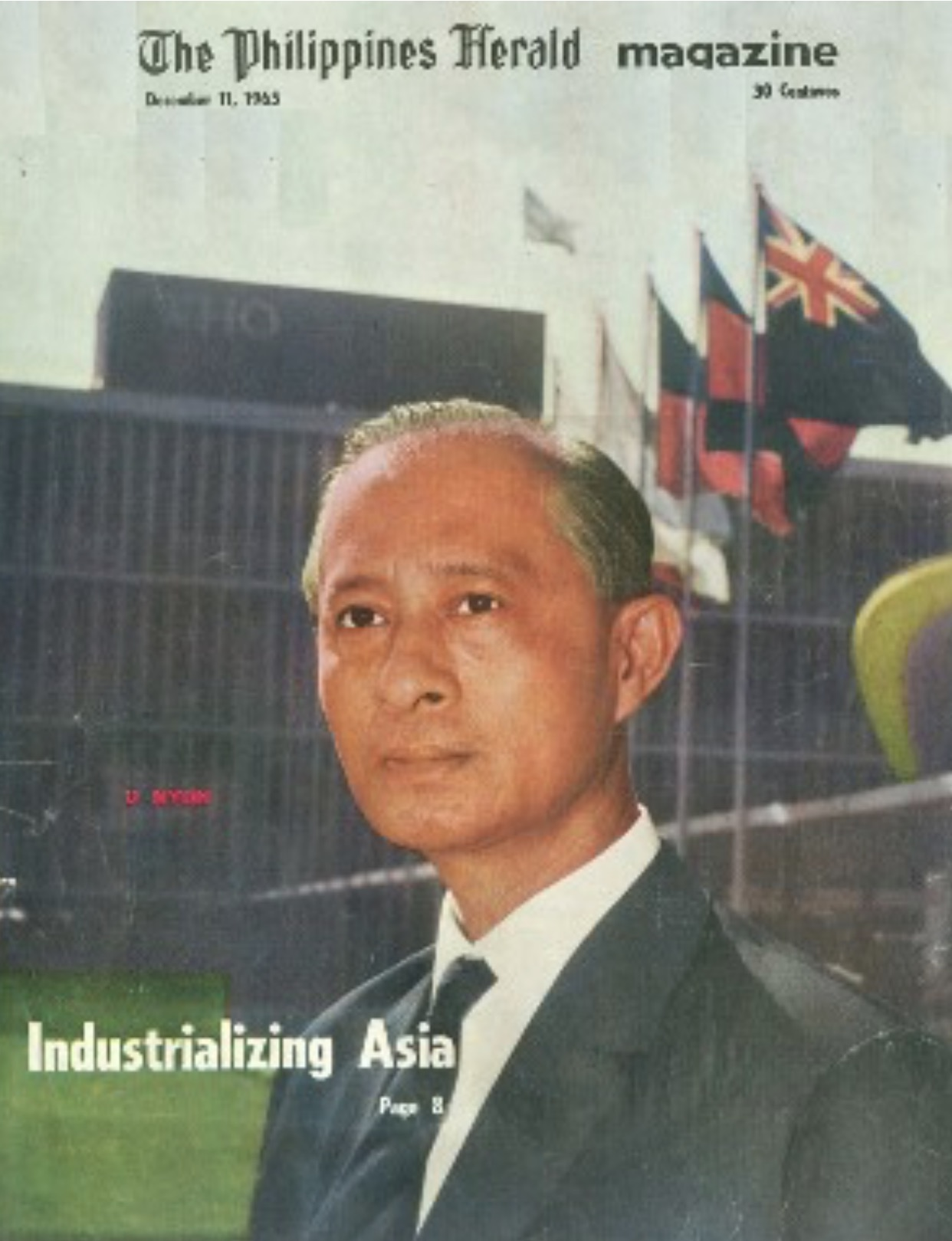
U Nyun on the cover of The Philippines Herald in 1954

== Personal life and death ==
U Nyun married Than Tin in 1935. He died on 8 April 1996 in Yangon, Myanmar. He is survived by his four sons and one daughter– Aung Nyun, Than Nyun, Myo Nyun, Hla Nyun and Marie Nyun.
