= International Journal of Asian Studies =

- Discipline: Asian studies
- Language: English
- Edited by: Jin Sato

Publication details
- History: 2004-present
- Publisher: Cambridge University Press (United Kingdom)
- Frequency: Biannually

Standard abbreviations
- ISO 4: Int. J. Asian Stud.

Indexing
- ISSN: 1479-5914 (print); 1479-5922 (web)

Links
- Journal homepage

The International Journal of Asian Studies (IJAS) is a peer-reviewed academic journal covering research in the social sciences and humanities as pertaining to Asia. The journal was established in 2004 and is published on behalf of the Institute for Advanced Studies on Asia (University of Tokyo).

The editor-in-chief is Jin Sato (University of Tokyo).

== Abstracting and indexing ==
The journal is abstracted and indexed in:

- Arts & Humanities Citation Index
- America: History and Life
- Bibliography of Asian Studies
- Index Islamicus
- International Bibliography of the Social Sciences
- Scopus
- ProQuest
- MLA - Modern Language Association Database
- Worldwide Political Science Abstracts
- Historical Abstracts
