= Asian Studies Review =

- Discipline: Asian studies
- Language: English
- Edited by: David Hundt

Publication details
- Former name: ASAA Review
- History: 1977–present
- Publisher: Routledge
- Frequency: Quarterly
- Open access: Hybrid
- Impact factor: 1.2 (2023)

Standard abbreviations
- ISO 4: Asian Stud. Rev.

Indexing
- ISSN: 1035-7823 (print); 1467-8403 (web)
- LCCN: sn90022983
- OCLC no.: 22530588

Links
- Journal homepage

Asian Studies Review is a peer-reviewed academic journal published by Routledge on behalf of the Asian Studies Association of Australia (ASAA).

According to the Journal Citation Reports, the journal has a 2023 impact factor of 1.2.

== History ==
ASAA ran a newsletter from 1975, switching to journal format in 1977, and called the ASAA Review. It obtained its present name in 1998.

Editors-in-chief have included Anthony Reid, Kam Louie, Jamie Mackie, and Anthony Milner. The current editor-in-chief is Dirk Tomsa (La Trobe University).

== Prize ==
The best article of the year, as judged by a panel, is awarded the Wang Gungwu Prize.

== Abstracting and indexing ==
The journal is abstracted and indexed in Scopus and the Bibliography of Asian Studies.
