= Armida Alisjahbana =

Secretary of the United Nations ESCAP

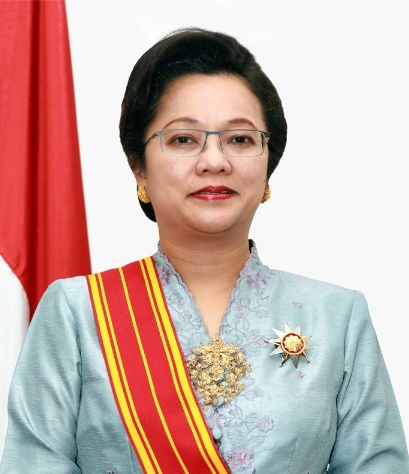
- Alisjahbana in 2014

Executive Secretary of United Nations Economic and Social Commission for Asia and the Pacific
- Incumbent
- Assumed office 13 September 2018
- Preceded by: Shamshad Akhtar

Minister for National Development Planning of Indonesia
- In office 22 October 2009 – 20 October 2014
- President: Susilo Bambang Yudhoyono
- Preceded by: Paskah Suzetta
- Succeeded by: Andrinof Chaniago

Personal details
- Born: Armida Salsiah Kusumaatmadja; 16 August 1960 (age 66) Jakarta, Indonesia
- Spouse: Andi Alisjahbana
- Relations: Mochtar Kusumaatmadja (father)
- Children: 2
- Education: University of Washington

Armida Salsiah Alisjahbana (née Kusumaatmadja; born 16 August 1960) is currently the Executive Secretary of the United Nations Economic and Social Commission for Asia and Pacific. She is a professor in the Faculty of Economics, Padjadjaran University, Bandung, and has served as Vice Dean for Academic Affairs. She is a former State Minister for National Development Planning / Head of BAPPENAS in the Second United Indonesia Cabinet under the administration of president Susilo Bambang Yudhoyono.

Alisjahbana is the daughter of Mochtar Kusumaatmadja, who was cabinet minister of Indonesia from 1973 to 1988.

== Career ==
Alisjahbana has served as chair of the Economics and Development Studies Department (now the Faculty of Economics) in Padjadjaran University and Director of the Center for Economics and Development Studies (LP3E). She obtained her B.A. in Economics from University of Indonesia and earned an M.A. in Economics from Northwestern University. She earned her PhD in Economics from University of Washington. Before becoming a minister, Alisjahbana undertook various research tasks for the World Bank and the Australian Agency for International Development (AusAID).

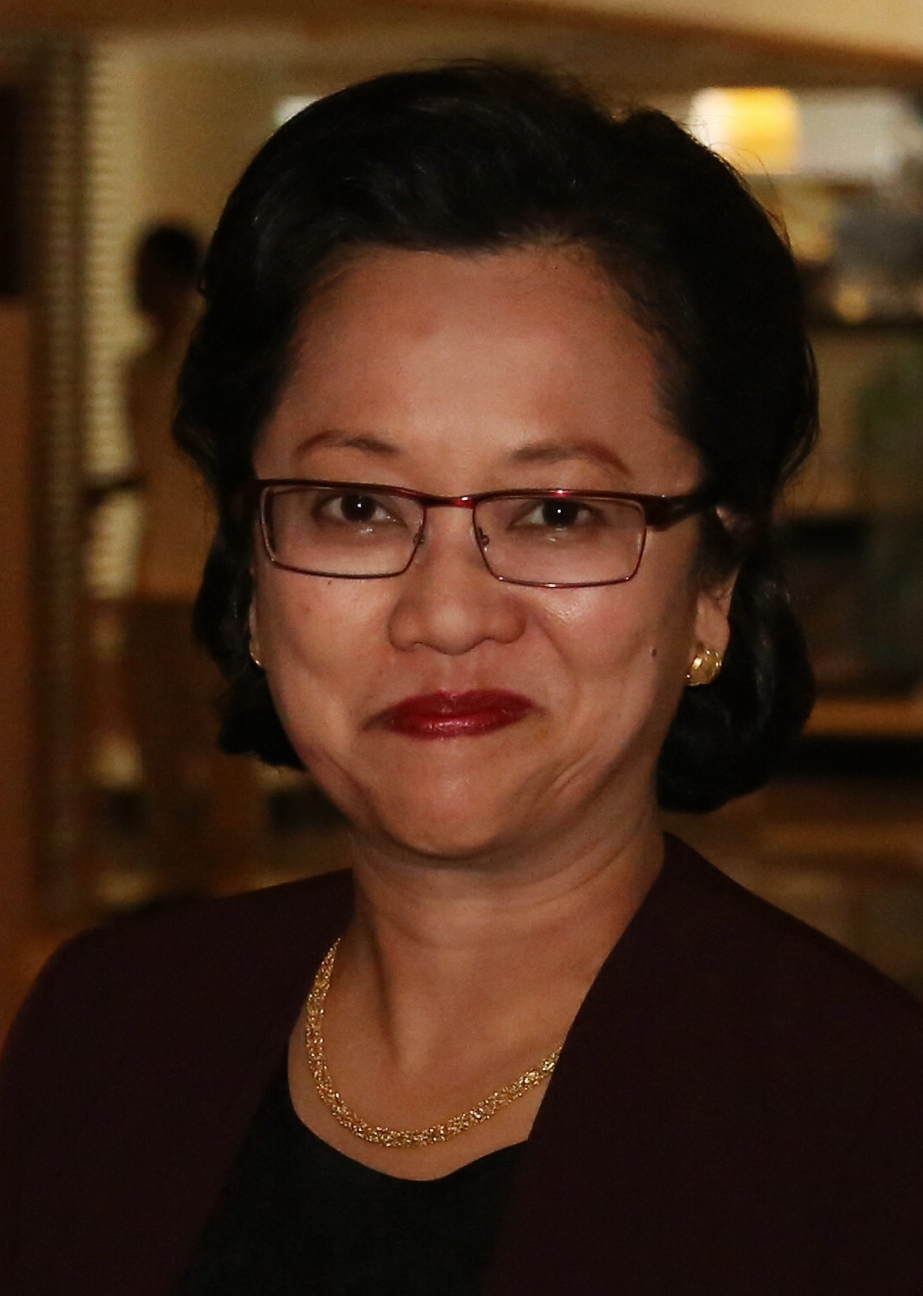
Alisjahbana in 2013

Alisjahbana served as a minister in the Second United Indonesia Cabinet as Minister of State for National Development and Planning / Head of Bappenas between 2009 and 2014.

== Personal life ==
Alisjahbana is the second daughter of Mochtar Kusumaatmadja and Siti Hadidjah. She is married to Andi Alisjahbana, formerly Director of Technology & Development of Indonesian Aerospace. They have two children.

== Published works ==
- Regional development in the era of decentralization : growth, poverty, and the environment ISBN 978-979-96647-7-8, ISBN 978-979-96647-7-8
- Green accounting and sustainable development in Indonesia ISBN 978-979-96647-8-5, ISBN 978-979-96647-8-5
- インドネシアの地方分権化: 分権化をめぐる中央・地方のダイナミクスとリアリティ, アジア経済研究所 (2003)
  (Regional Income Inequality in Indonesia and the Initial Impact of the Economic Crisis)
- Pemikiran dan permasalahan ekonomi di Indonesia dalam setengah abad terakhir [1945 - 2005] buku 1 s.d. buku 5 ISBN 978-979-21-1207-8, ISBN 978-979-21-1207-8
- Labour Market Dimensions of Poverty in Indonesia
- "Survey of Recent Developments", Bulletin of Indonesian Economic Studies, 2002, Vol 38, No 3, December. (with Chris Manning).
- "Tenaga kerja di pundak SBY", Majalah Tempo, Vol. 35, No 35, 2006.
- "Survey of Recent Developments", Bulletin of Indonesian Economic Studies, 2017, Vol 53, No 2, August. (with Jonah Busch).

Political offices
| Preceded by Paskah Suzetta | State Minister for National Development Planning; 2009–2014 | Succeeded by Andrinof A. Chaniago |
Incumbent
