= Heinz Arndt =

Australian economist

- Born: Heinz Wolfgang Arndt; 26 February 1915; Breslau, German Empire
- Died: 6 April 2002 (aged 87); Canberra, Australia
- Education: Lincoln College, Oxford, University of Oxford
- Occupations: economist, lecturer, editor, author
- Spouse: Ruth (née Strohsahl)
- Children: Christopher; Nicholas; Bettina
- Writing career
- Genre: Economics
- Notable works: The Economic Lessons of the Nineteen Thirties; The Australian Trading Banks; The Rise and Fall of Economic Growth: A Study of Contemporary Thought
- Notable awards: Bintang Jasa Pratama (Indonesian Presidential Medal of Merit) (1995)

Heinz Wolfgang Arndt (26 February 1915 – 6 May 2002) was a German-born Australian economist.

== Biography ==
Heinz Wolfgang Arndt was born in Breslau, Germany, in 1915, the eldest son of Fritz Georg Arndt (1885–1969) and Julia (née Heimann). Arndt gained two degrees at Oxford and taught at the London School of Economics and University of Manchester before settling in Australia in 1946. While studying in England, he married his wife Ruth (née Strohsahl) with whom he later lived in Canberra until her death in 2001.

In 1950, Arndt took up a chairmanship in economics at the then Canberra University College. He was elected a Fellow of the Academy of the Social Sciences in Australia in 1954. He became head of the department at the Research School of Pacific (and Asian) Studies at the Australian National University (ANU) in 1963. He held this position until retiring in 1980. One of his main activities as head of the department was the establishment and management of the Indonesia Project which sponsors research on the Indonesian economy. As part of his activities with the Indonesia Project he established the academic journal Bulletin of Indonesian Economic Studies (BIES).

Arndt died in a car crash in Canberra in May 2002. He was on his way to attend the funeral of his close friend Leslie Melville, at which he was to deliver a eulogy.

Arndt was President of the Economic Society of Australia and New Zealand, and President of Section G (Economics) of ANZAAS. He wrote or co-wrote seven books, edited two collections of articles by various authors on the Australian economy, published six collections of his own essays, and produced more than a hundred articles, reports, book reviews and published lectures. He also acted as an adviser on various occasions to international inquiries and committees. In 1979 he was appointed as chair of group of experts to prepare a study for the Commonwealth on factors restraining global economic growth at the beginning of the 1980s.

Arndt also edited the magazine Quadrant.

Arndt had three children, Christopher, Nicholas and Bettina.

In October 2008, Arndt Street in the suburb of Forde in Canberra was named jointly after Ruth and Heinz Arndt in recognition of their work in the Canberra community and of Heinz Arndt's contribution to Australian study of economic developments in Asia.

== Bibliography ==
- Arndt, H. W. (1944). The economic lessons of the Nineteen-Thirties. London: Oxford University Press.
- The Australian Trading Banks (1957) Melbourne: Cheshire
- The Australian Economy: A Volume of Readings (ed. with W.M. Corden) (1963) Melbourne: Cheshire
- Taxation in Australia: Agenda for Reform (with R.I. Downing and others) (1964) Melbourne: Melbourne University Press
- Some Factors in Economic Growth in Europe during the 1950s (official publication; co-author) (1964) Geneva: United Nations
- A Small Rich Industrial Country: Studies in Australian Development, Trade and Aid (1968) Melbourne: Cheshire
- Three times 18: an essay in political biography Quadrant, May–June 1969
- The Australian Economy: a Second Volume of Readings (ed. with A.H. Boxer) (1972) Melbourne: Cheshire
- Australia. OECD Economic Survey (official publication; co-author) (1973) Paris: OECD
- The Rise and Fall of Economic Growth. A Study in Contemporary Thought (1978) Melbourne: Longman Cheshire.
- The World Economic Crisis. A Commonwealth Perspective (co-author with A.K. Cairncross and others) (1980) London: Commonwealth Secretariat
- The Indonesian Economy – Collected Papers (1984) Singapore: Chopman Publications
- A Course Through Life: Memoirs of an Australian Economist (1985) Canberra: ANU
- Asian Diaries (1987) Singapore: Chopman Publications
- Economic Development: The History of an Idea (1987) Chicago: Chicago University Press
- Fifty Years of Development Studies (1993) Canberra: ANU
- Essays in International Economics, 1944–1994 (1996) London: Avery
- — (July–August 1996). "The deaths in East Timor". Letters. Quadrant. 40 (7–8): 5.
- Southeast Asia's Economic Crisis (co-author with Hal Hill) (1999) St. Leonards, NSW: Allen & Unwin
- Essays in Biography: Australian Economists Supplement to History of Economics Review, No. 32, Summer 2000.
- The Importance of Money. Essays in Domestic Macroeconomics 1949–1999 (2001) Abingdon: Ashgate.
