= Hadi Soesastro =

Indonesian economist, academic and public intellectual

- Born: Tan Yueh Ming; 30 April 1945; Malang, East Java, Indonesia
- Died: 4 May 2010 (aged 65); Jakarta
- Spouse: Janti Solihin
- Children: Auguste Soesastro

Academic background
- Education: Rheinisch-Westfälische Technische Hochschule Aachen (Ph.D); Frederick S. Pardee RAND Graduate School (Ph.D.)

Academic work
- Notable ideas: Founder of Centre for Strategic and International Studies

Hadi Soesastro, born Tan Yueh Ming; 30 April 1945 – 4 May 2010), colloquially known as Hadi or Mingkie, was an Indonesian economist, academic and public intellectual. Hadi was one of the founders of the Centre for Strategic and International Studies (CSIS), a think tank founded in 1971, where he served as an executive director and economist. The Jakarta Post referred to Soesastro as one of Indonesia’s foremost economists"

He was born in the city of Malang, East Java, Indonesia. He graduated with an aeronautical engineering degree from the Technische Hochschule in Aachen, Germany. Aside from his studies, Hadi was active in the Indonesian students association, becoming chairman of the West German branch. He obtained his doctorate from the Frederick S. Pardee RAND Graduate School in Santa Monica, California. He worked as an economist at the CSIS, which he helped to found. He worked as an advisor to both the World Bank and the Asian Development Bank. From December 1999 until September 2000, Soesastro served as an economic advisor to Indonesian President Abdurrahman Wahid as a member of the president's National Economic Council. Within the academic field, Soesastro was an adjunct professor at Columbia University in New York City. and Australian National University's Research School of Pacific and Asian Studies (RSPAS) and maintained close links with the activities of the Indonesia project in the RSPAS.

In April 2013, the Australian government announced the Hadi Soesastro Prize, awarded annually to two Australia Awards Scholarship recipients from Indonesia undertaking doctorates in Australia. An entitlement of up to $25,000 will be awarded to Australia Awards Hadi Soesastro Prize scholars for further study, field work, conference attendance, and research or community projects. He was board member of the Asia Society in New York and founding member of the Pacific Economic Cooperation Council.
