= Thee Kian Wie =

Indonesian writer

Personal details
- Born: April 20, 1935 Jakarta, Indonesia, Dutch East Indies
- Died: 8 February 2014 (aged 78) Jakarta, Indonesia
- Spouse: Tjoe Thee
- Education: University of Indonesia, Jakarta; University of Wisconsin, Madison, Wisconsin, US
- Profession: Economist

Thee Kian Wie (Chinese: 戴建偉; pinyin: Dài Jiànwěi; April 20, 1935 – February 8, 2014) was an Indonesian economist, academic and senior member of the Indonesian Institute of Sciences (LIPI). The Jakarta Post has called him "one of Indonesia’s most respected economists." He was also a long time lecturer at the University of Indonesia's Faculty of Economics.

Thee, a Chinese Indonesian, was born in present-day Jakarta (then known as Batavia) on April 20, 1935. He obtained a doctorandus degree from the University of Indonesia in 1959. Thee then received both his master's degree and his doctorate (1969) from the University of Wisconsin–Madison. His doctoral dissertation on the topic of Plantation Agriculture and Export Growth: An Economic History of East Sumatra 1863-1942 was a first step in establishing him as a professional economic historian of the Indonesian economy.

He was awarded an honorary doctorate from the Australian National University in 2004, the Habibie Award in 2006, and the Sarwono Prawirohardjo Award in 2008. In 2010, in honour of his 75th birthday, Thee's colleagues prepared Merajut Sejarah Ekonomi Indonesia: Essays in Honour of Thee Kian Wie 75 Years Birthday [Weaving Indonesia's Economic History: Essays in Honour of Thee Kian Wie 75 Years Birthday], as a festschrift for him.

Thee Kian Wie suffered a fall at his home in 2014. He died from complications of his injuries at PGI Cikini Hospital in Jakarta on February 8, 2014, at the age of 79. His funeral was attended by dignitaries including the Vice President of Indonesia Boediono and analyst Dewi Fortuna Anwar.

In recognition of Thee's contributions to scholarship in Indonesian economic history and of his international reputation, an In Memoriam article was published in the August 2014 issue of the Bulletin of Indonesian Economic Studies.

== Main publications ==
- 1975. The Regional Economic Survey of South Sumatra, 1970-1971, edited with Shinichi Ichimura. Jakarta: Indonesian Institute of Sciences.
- 1977. Plantation Agriculture and Export Growth: An Economic History of East Sumatra 1863-1942. Jakarta: National Economic Institute, Indonesian Institute of Sciences (Leknas-LIPI).
- 1981. Pemerataan, Kemiskinan, Ketimpangan: Beberapa Masalah Pertumbuhan Ekonomi-Kumpulan Esei [Equity, Poverty, and Disparities: Some Problems of Economic Growth]. Jakarta: Sinar Harapan.
- 1988. Industrialisasi Indonesia: Analisis dan Catatan Kritis [Indonesian Industrialisation: Analysis and Critical Notes]. Jakarta: Sinar Harapan.
- 1988. The North Sumatran Regional Economy: Growth with Unbalanced Development, with Colin Barlow. Singapore: Institute of Southeast Asian Studies.
- 1994. Explorations in Indonesian Economic History. Jakarta: Lembaga Penerbit Fakultas Ekonomi, Universitas Indonesia.
- 1994. Industrialisasi Indonesia: Beberapa Kajian [Studies of Indonesian Industrialisation]. Jakarta: LP3ES.
- 1998. Indonesia's Technological Challenge, edited with Hal Hill. Singapore" Institute of Southeast Asian Studies.
- 2002. The Emergence of a National Economy: An Economic History of Indonesia, 1800-2000, with Howard Dick, Vincent Houben, and Thomas Lindblad. Sydney: Allen and Unwin; Leiden: KITLV Press.
- 2003. Recollections: The Indonesian Economy, 1950s-1990s, as editor. Singapore: Institute of Southeast Asian Studies.
- 2012. Indonesia's Economy since Independence. Singapore: Institute of Southeast Asian Studies.
