= Mari Elka Pangestu =

Indonesian economist (born 1956)

- 馮慧蘭
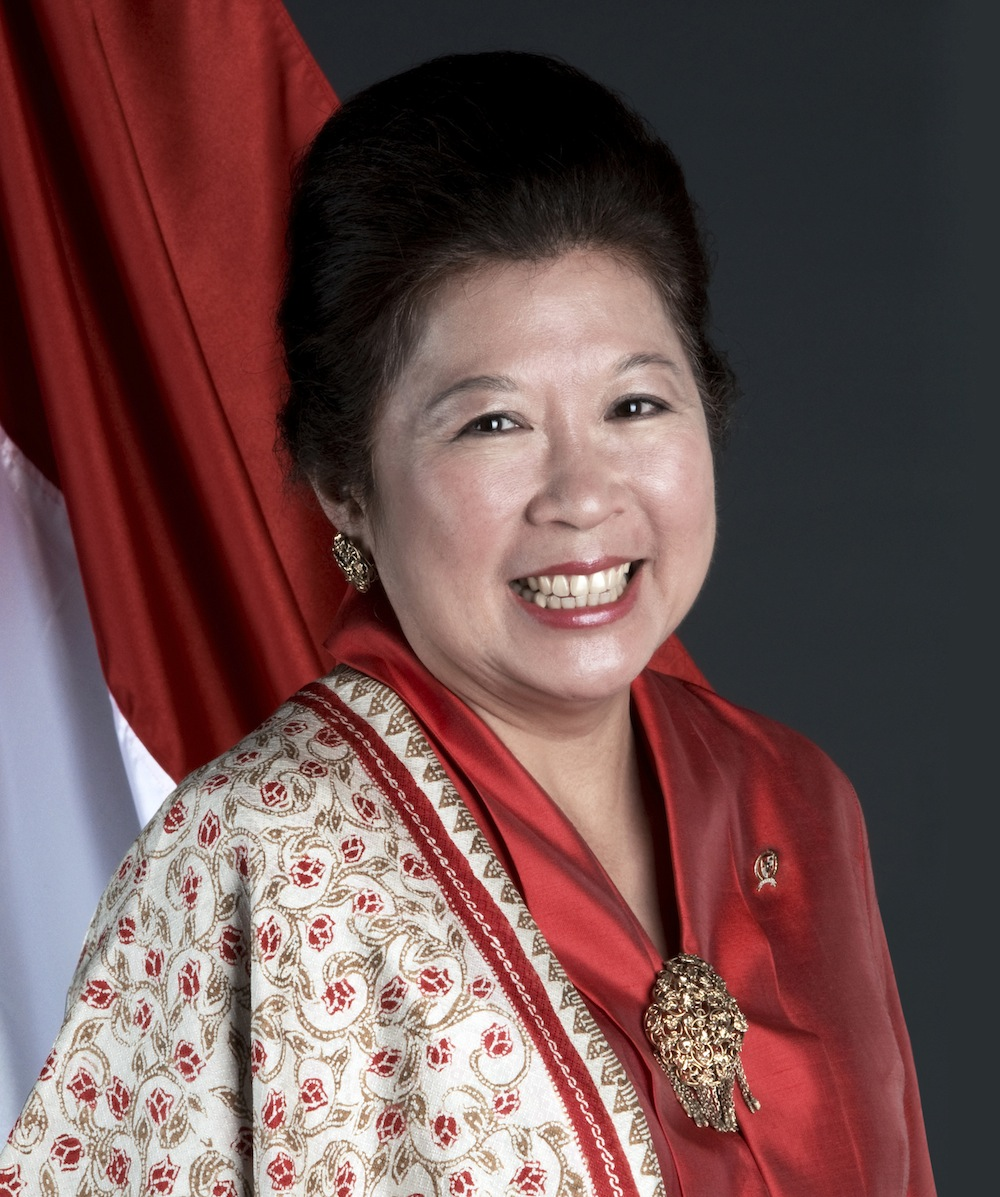

2nd Deputy Chairwomen of the National Economic Council
- Incumbent
- Assumed office 21 October 2024
- President: Prabowo Subianto
- Preceded by: Subiakto Tjakrawerdaya

Minister of Tourism and Creative Economy
- In office 19 October 2011 – 20 October 2014
- President: Susilo Bambang Yudhoyono
- Preceded by: Jero Wacik
- Succeeded by: Arief Yahya

Minister of Trade
- In office 21 October 2004 – 19 October 2011
- President: Susilo Bambang Yudhoyono
- Preceded by: Rini Mariani Soemarno Soewandi
- Succeeded by: Gita Wirjawan

Minister of Cooperatives and Small & Medium Enterprises ad-interim
- In office 1 October 2008 – 22 October 2009
- President: Susilo Bambang Yudhoyono
- Preceded by: Suryadharma Ali
- Succeeded by: Syarief Hasan

Managing Director of Development Policy and Partnerships of the World Bank
- In office 1 March 2020 – 1 March 2023
- President: David Malpass

Personal details
- Born: Phang Hoei Lan; 23 October 1956 (age 69) Djakarta, Indonesia
- Spouse: Adi Harsono
- Children: Raymond; Arya
- Education: Australian National University; University of California, Davis

Mari Elka Pangestu (traditional Chinese: 馮慧蘭; simplified Chinese: 冯慧兰; pinyin: Féng Huìlán: hokkien: Phang Hoei Lan; born 23 October 1956), who is currently serving as the Indonesian President's Special Advisor for International Trade and Multilateral Cooperation, appointed by President Prabowo Subianto on 21 October 2024. In early November 2024, she is appointed by President Prabowo Subianto as the Vice Chair of the National Economic Council of the Republic of Indonesia, serving with Mr. Luhut Binsar Pandjaitan as the Chairman. Currently, She also serves as an independent director at Mitsubishi UFJ Financial Group, one of the largest Japanese financial and banking firms. Mari is an Indonesian economist who served as managing director of Development Policy and Partnerships in the World Bank from 2020 to 2023. The President of the World Bank, David Malpass, announced her appointment on 9 January 2020 saying that she would be responsible for development policy and partnerships in her role in the bank. Previously she served as Minister of Trade in Indonesia from October 2004 to October 2011.

Pangestu has had extensive policy-making experience in Indonesia. Following her period as Minister for Trade, in a cabinet reshuffle in October 2011, she was appointed to the newly created position of minister of Tourism and Creative Economy, a post she held until the term of the administration of President Susilo Bambang Yudhoyono finished on 20 October 2014.

== Early life and education ==
Born in Jakarta, Pangestu obtained her bachelor's and master's degrees in economics from the Australian National University, and her Doctorate in economics from the University of California at Davis, United States, in 1986.

== Career in academia ==
Earlier in her career, Pangestu worked at the Centre for Strategic and International Studies (CSIS) in Jakarta and was active over a long period in various trade forums such as PECC. She also served as an instructor in the Faculty of Economics & Business at the University of Indonesia. She is widely published in the Indonesian and international media. She serves on the Board of External Editors of the Asian Journal of Business (University of Michigan) and Bulletin of Indonesian Economic Studies (produced by the Indonesia Project at the Australian National University). She also served as co-coordinator of the Task Force on Poverty and Development for the United Nations Millennium Project.

After finishing her term as a minister Pangestu resumed regular activities in the Centre for Strategic and International Studies in Jakarta as well as serving as a professor in international economics in the Economics Faculty at the University of Indonesia.

== Political career ==
Pangestu is the first female Indonesian of Chinese descent to hold a cabinet position in Indonesia. After her appointment to the new cabinet position of Tourism and Creative Economy, she spent time explaining the approach of the government towards fostering creative sectors of the economy in several statements.

The initial listing of the 14 sub-sectors included in the scope of the creative economy part of the Ministry was the following:

- Arts and antique markets
- Performing arts
- Handicrafts
- Film, video and photography
- Fashion
- Interactive games
- Advertising
- Design
- Software and computers
- Music
- Architecture
- Publishing
- Television and radio
- Research and development

Tourism

When focusing on tourism priorities within her portfolio she was supportive of plans to develop the tourist sector but also pointed out some well-known problems. She noted, for example, that problems of hygiene, security, and poor infrastructure constitute handicaps for the industry in Indonesia. She discussed the need for a strategy to develop the tourist sector. She also emphasised that a range of challenges would need to be tackled in promoting the sector in Indonesia and that some of the challenges would take time to overcome. Other steps she announced to promote tourism included an emphasis on sports tourism, with priority to be given to the promotion of golf in the short term and increasing attention to other activities such as yachting over the longer term.

In late 2012 Pangestu expressed the hope that up to 10 million foreign tourists would visit Indonesia in 2014. She noted that there had been a falling away of tourists visiting Indonesia from Europe following the economic problems in 2011 and 2012 in the eurozone. However, she said that the government hoped that foreign tourist arrivals from countries in the Asia-Pacific region would hopefully offset the fall in tourists from Europe. She particularly pointed to the importance of the Chinese market where, she said, outbound tourists had climbed to 70 million in 2011.

Creative economy

After being given responsibility for creative economy matters in 2011, Pangestu was energetic in promoting a wide range of activities in the sector. She urged regional governments to promote local creative activities and spoke of the importance of strengthening intellectual property rights to encourage young Indonesian artists and creative entrepreneurs to develop Indonesian products. In November 2012, with the support of the Panglaykim Foundation, she supported the visit of creative economy author John Howkins to Jakarta to discuss policies to promote creative economy activities.

Although she was respected in the WTO and international forums such as the G20, Pangestu often clashed with cabinet colleagues who wanted to protect domestic interests. She was also criticised by domestic industry groups for supporting trade-promotion measures rather than looking to increase protection for domestic producers. Her response to these criticisms was to note that Indonesia needed to adhere to international commitments to promote trade-oriented policies and that freer trade brought many benefits to domestic consumers and producers in Indonesia.

== Later career ==
In late December 2012 the Indonesian Government nominated Pangestu as a candidate for the position of Director-General of the World Trade Organization (WTO) to succeed the incumbent Director-General, Pascal Lamy, whose term ended in 2013. The General Council of the WTO considered nominations from various countries in early 2013. The selection process went through various rounds and in late April 2013 eliminated all three candidates from the Asia-Pacific region; the role eventually went to Roberto Azevêdo.

== Recognition ==
In December 2013, in recognition of her achievements as an economist and policymaker in Asia, Pangestu was awarded an honorary doctorate by the Australian National University (ANU). While visiting Canberra to receive the degree she recalled her years as a student in Australia when her father was academic staff member at the ANU.

== Personal life ==
Pangestu is married to Adi Harsono and has two children, Raymond and Arya.

== See also ==
- List of Chinese Indonesians
