= Union Civil Service Board =

Civil service commission of Myanmar

- ပြည်ထောင်စုရာထူးဝန်အဖွဲ့
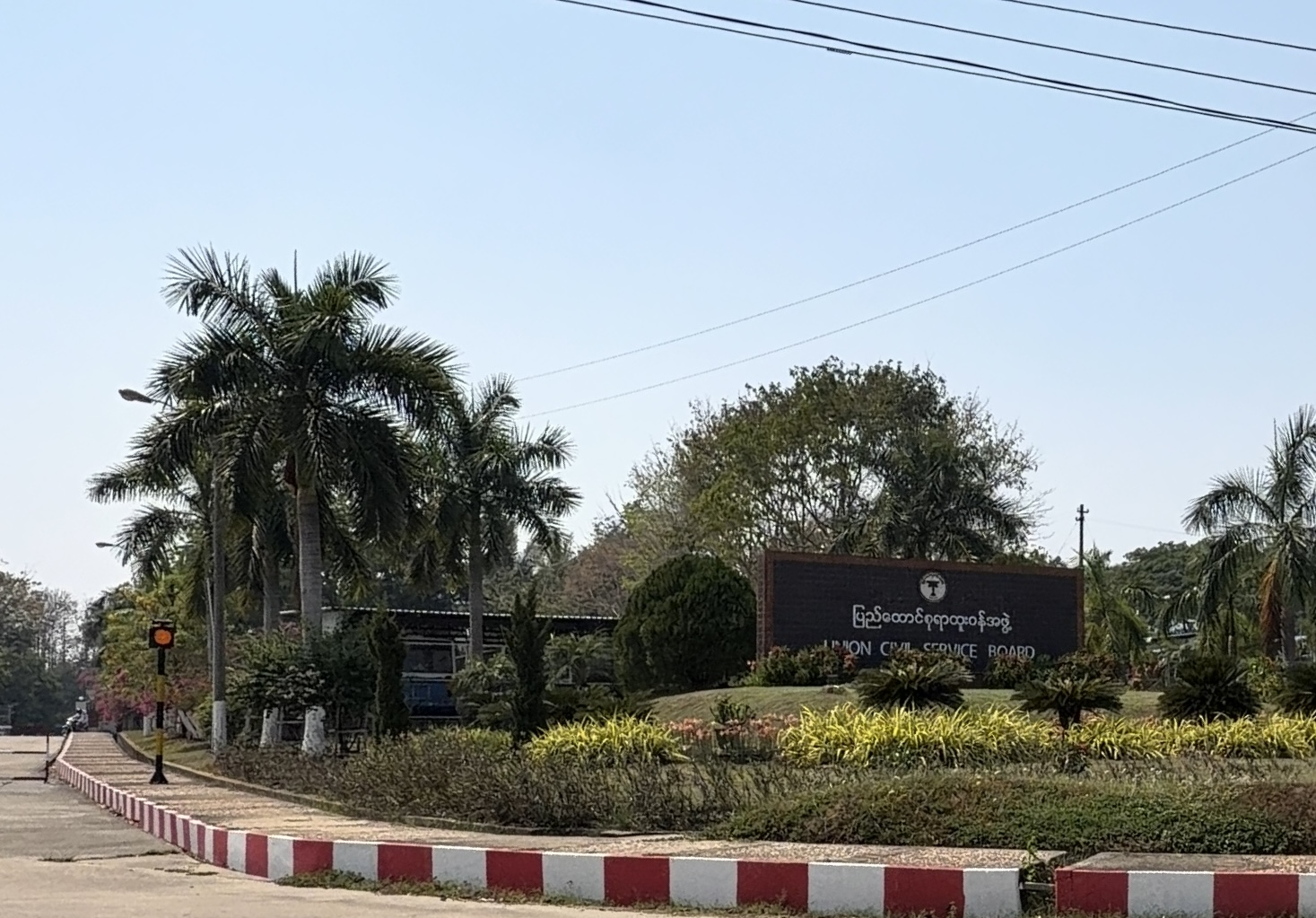
- Headquarter

Agency overview
- Formed: 28 October 2010; 16 years ago
- Preceding agency: Civil Service Selection and Training Board
- Type: Board
- Jurisdiction: Government of the Union of Myanmar
- Headquarters: Office No (17), Naypyidaw
- Agency executive: Tin Maung Win, Chairperson
- Website: www.ucsb.gov.mm

The Union Civil Service Board (Burmese: ပြည်ထောင်စုရာထူးဝန်အဖွဲ့, abbreviated UCSB) is Myanmar's national civil service commission. It was formed on 28 October 2010 in accordance with the 2010 Union Civil Service Board Law, enacted by the State Peace and Development Council (SPDC). The board can trace its origins to the Public Service Commission (PSC), which was initially formed on 1 April 1937 while its direct predecessor was the Civil Service Selection and Training Board (CSSTB), which was formed under the 1977 Civil Service Selection and Training Board Law.

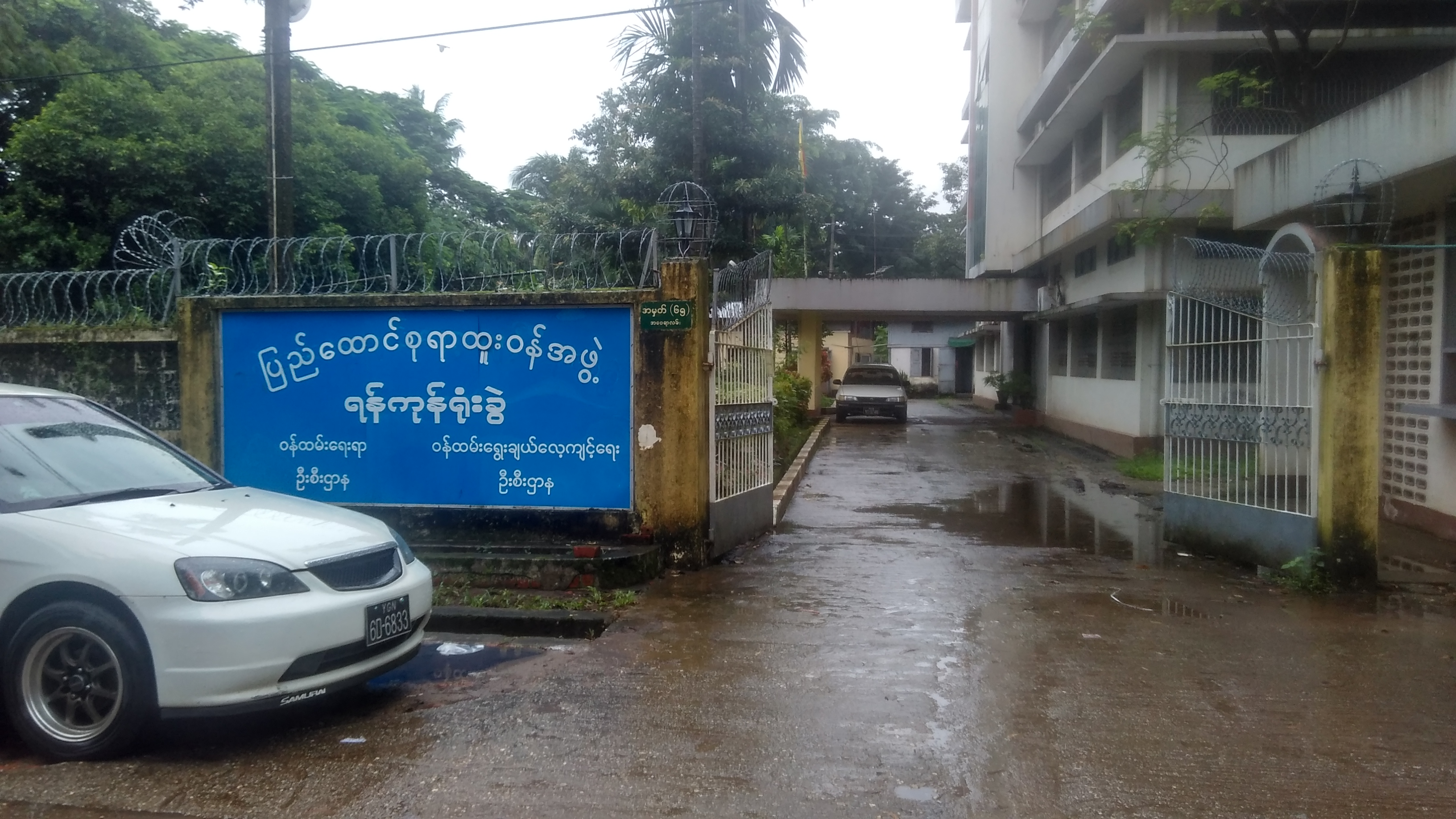
Yangon Branch

== Powers and Responsibilities ==
The Union Civil Service Board (UCSB) was first established under the 2008 Constitution of Myanmar. Its powers include:

1. Selecting ranks
2. Establishing and maintaining training institutions
3. Subordinate bodies
4. Civil service promotions
5. Regulations and ethics
6. Maintaining disciplinary records
7. Advise on civil service

== Organization ==
The UCSB is divided into the following:

- Civil Service Selection and Training Department
- Civil Service Affairs Department
- Central Institute of Civil Service (Phaunggyi)
- Central Institute of Civil Service (Upper Myanmar)

The Civil Service Selection and Training Department (CSSTD) is responsible for selecting personnel for recruitment into the Myanmar civil service and administrative matters of training said personnel. The Civil Service Affairs Department (CSAD)'s duties include taking care of civil service matters concerning laws, rules, regulations, etc. The CSAD is also responsible for providing consultancy on and conducting research on civil service performance, data, and other aspects.

The University for the Development of the National Races of the Union, while technically not a part of the UCSB as it is under the Ministry of Border Affairs (MoBA), offers several programs that UCSB and civil service members could gain valuable information from. The university has the following education departments.

- Department of Educational Theory
- Department of Educational Psychology
- Department of Teaching Methodology
- Department of Myanmar
- Department of English
- Department of Mathematics
- Department of History
- Department of Geography
- Department of Economics
- Department of Chemistry
- Department of Physics
- Department of Biology
- Department of Computer Science
- Department of Physical Education
- Department of Fine Arts
- Department of Music and Dancing
- Department of Domestic Science
- Department of Industrial Art
- Department of National Languages and Culture
- Department of Agriculture and Animal Husbandry
- Department of Moral Education

== Membership ==
The board is led by a Chairperson, with six other members. Currently, these members are:

1. U Tin Maung Win (Chairperson)
2. U Soe Tint
3. Dr Su Su Dwe
4. U Tun Tun Win
5. Daw Khin Myo Myint
6. Daw Khin Shwe Myint
7. Dr Khin Chit Chit

== See also ==
- Ministry of Home Affairs
