= Jamie Mackie (academic) =

Australian political scientist (1924–1911)

James Austin Copland Mackie (27 September 1924–21 April 2011), known as Jamie Mackie, was an Australian academic, described by The Australian as one of the country's "pioneers of its post-war engagement with Asia" and by The Age as having had a "distinguished academic career to the study of post-colonial south-east Asia." Born in Kandy to the Australian manager of a tea plantation, he studied at Geelong Grammar and later at Oxford before working "with the Colombo Plan in Jakarta from 1956 to 1958, working with the newly established National Planning Bureau." He taught at the University of Melbourne (1958–1967) and Monash University (1968–1978) and edited the ASAA Review. He is also credited with playing a major role in the dismantling of the White Australia policy, which severely restricted non-White migration. After his death, the J.A.C. Mackie Memorial Endowment was established by the Australian National University to fund travel scholarships to Southeast Asia for undergraduate or graduate students.

== Books by J. A. C. Mackie ==
=== As author ===
- Introduction to Bahasa Indonesia, Carlton, Victoria: Melbourne University Press and London: Cambridge University Press, 1966. Joint author: Jan Pieter Sarumpaet.
- Konfrontasi : The Indonesia-Malaysia Dispute, 1963-1966, Kuala Lumpur: Oxford University Press for the Australian Institute of International Affairs, 1974 [i.e. 1975].
- Australia in the New World Order : Foreign Policy in the 1970s, Melbourne: Thomas Nelson in association with the Australian Institute of International Affairs, Melbourne, 1976.

=== As editor ===
- The Chinese in Indonesia : Five Essays, Hong Kong: Heinemann Asia, 1975 (Asian Studies Series); Melbourne: Thomas Nelson (Australia) in association with the Australian Institute of International Affairs, Melbourne, 1976.
