= United Nations Economic and Social Commission for Asia and the Pacific =

Specialized body of the United Nations

- Abbreviation: ESCAP
- Formation: 28 March 1947; 79 years ago
- Type: Primary Organ – Regional Branch
- Legal status: Active
- Headquarters: Bangkok, Thailand
- Head: Executive Secretary of the United Nations Economic and Social Commission for Asia and the Pacific; Armida Salsiah Alisjahbana
- Parent organization: United Nations Economic and Social Council
- Website: www.unescap.org

Map showing the member states of the United Nations Economic and Social Commission for Asia and the Pacific as of 2025 (Note that the United States of America withdrew its membership in 2026)

The United Nations Economic and Social Commission for Asia and the Pacific (ESCAP or UNESCAP) is one of the five regional commissions under the jurisdiction of the United Nations Economic and Social Council. It was established in order to increase economic activity in Asia and the Far East, as well as to foster economic relations between the region and other areas of the world.

The commission is composed of 53 member states and nine associate members, mostly from the Asia and Pacific regions. In addition to countries in Asia and the Pacific, the commission's members include France, the Netherlands, the United Kingdom and the United States.

The region covered by the commission is home to 4.1 billion people, or two-thirds of the world's population, making ESCAP the most comprehensive of the United Nations' five regional commissions.

== History ==
The commission was first established by the Economic and Social Council on 28 March 1947 as the United Nations Economic Commission for Asia and the Far East (ECAFE) to assist in post-war economic reconstruction. Its main mandate was to "initiate and participate in measures for facilitating concerted action for the economic reconstruction and development of Asia and the Far East."

On 1 August 1974, the commission was renamed to the Economic and Social Commission for Asia and the Pacific (ESCAP) by the Economic and Social Council to reflect both the economic and social aspects of the Commission's work, as well as geographic location of its members.

== Member states ==
There are a total of 53 full ESCAP member states and nine associate members, four of the member states are not geographically located in Asia or Oceania.

=== Full member states ===
The following countries are the full member states of the commission:

- Afghanistan^{#} (24 April 1953)
- Armenia (26 July 1994)
- Australia (28 March 1947)
- Azerbaijan (31 July 1992)
- Bangladesh^{#} (17 April 1973)
- Bhutan (06 January 1972)
- Brunei Darussalam (26 July 1985)
- Cambodia^{#} (20 August 1954)
- China^{ǂ} (28 March 1947)
- Democratic People's Republic of Korea (the) (31 July 1992)
- Fiji (03 August 1979)
- France^{* ^} (28 March 1947)
- Georgia (25 July 2000)
- India (28 March 1947)
- Indonesia (28 September 1950)
- Iran (the Islamic Republic of) (10 July 1958)
- Japan (24 June 1954)
- Kazakhstan (31 July 1992)
- Kiribati^{#} (26 July 1991)
- Kyrgyzstan (31 July 1992)
- Lao People's Democratic Republic (the) (16 February 1955)
- Malaysia (17 September 1957)
- Maldives (05 August 1976)
- Marshall Islands (the) (31 July 1992)
- Micronesia (the Federated States of) (31 July 1992)
- Mongolia (21 December 1961)
- Myanmar^{#} (19 April 1948)
- Nauru (20 July 1971)
- Nepal^{#} (06 June 1955)
- Netherlands (the Kingdom of the)^{*} (28 March 1947)
- New Zealand (08 March 1948)
- Pakistan (30 September 1947)
- Palau (18 July 1996)
- Papua New Guinea (27 August 1976)
- Philippines (the) (28 March 1947)
- Republic of Korea (the) (20 October 1954)
- Russian Federation (the)^{†} (28 March 1947)
- Samoa (05 July 1963)
- Singapore (21 September 1965)
- Solomon Islands^{#} (03 August 1979)
- Sri Lanka (10 December 1954)
- Tajikistan (31 July 1992)
- Thailand (28 March 1947)
- Timor-Leste^{#} (18 July 2003)
- Tonga (20 July 1971)
- Türkiye (18 July 1996)
- Turkmenistan (31 July 1992)
- Tuvalu^{#} (26 July 1985)
- United Kingdom of Great Britain and Northern Ireland (the)^{*} (28 March 1947)
- Uzbekistan (31 July 1992)
- Vanuatu (27 July 1984)
- Viet Nam (23 August 1954)

Notes:

^{*} Not geographically located in Asia or Oceania

^{#} Least Developed Country

^{†} Continuation of membership of the former Union of Soviet Socialist Republics (USSR)

^{ǂ} Continuation of membership of the Republic of China (ROC)

^{^} Continuation of membership of the French Fourth Republic

=== Associate members ===
The following countries and territories are the associate members of the commission:

- American Samoa^{*} (28 July 1988)
- Cook Islands (the)^{*} (11 July 1972)
- French Polynesia^{*} (31 July 1992)
- Guam^{*} (24 July 1981)
- Hong Kong, China^{* †} (25 November 1947)
- Macao, China^{* ǂ} (26 July 1991)
- New Caledonia^{*} (31 July 1992)
- Niue^{*} (03 August 1979)
- Northern Mariana Islands (the)^{*} (22 July 1986)

Notes:

^{*} Not a member state of the United Nations

^{†} Change of name from Hong Kong to Hong Kong, China (01 July 1997)

^{ǂ} Change of name to Macau, China (20 December 1999) and further changed to Macao, China (04 February 2000)

=== Former member states ===
- United States of America (the) (28 March 1947 - January 2026)

== Locations ==
=== Headquarters ===
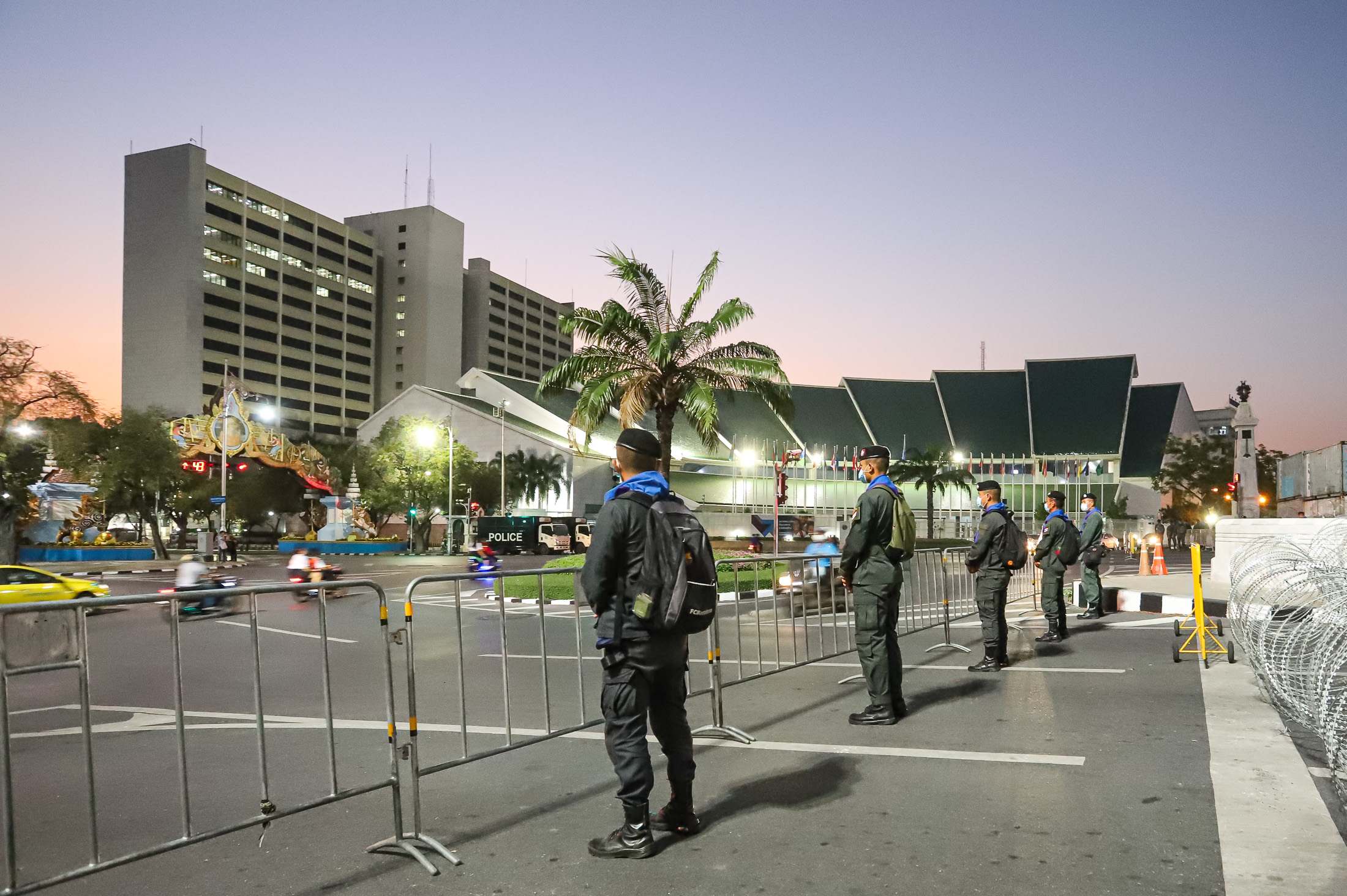
The commission's headquarters in Bangkok, Thailand

The commission was originally located in Shanghai, China, from its foundation until 1949, when it moved its headquarters to the United Nations Conference Centre in Bangkok, Thailand.

=== Subregional offices ===
The commission maintains five subregional offices in order to better target and deliver programs, given the large size of the region.

The subregions and their headquarters are as follows:

- East and North East Asia (ENEA) subregional headquarters – Incheon, Republic of Korea
- North and Central Asia (NCA) subregional headquarters – Almaty, Kazakhstan
- South and South West Asia (SSWA) subregional headquarters – New Delhi, India
- South East Asia (SEA) – Bangkok, Thailand
- The Pacific (PACIFIC) subregional headquarters – Suva, Fiji

== Executive secretaries ==
The following is a list of the executive secretaries of the commission since its foundation:

Member states
	Secretary	Country	Term
11	Armida S. Alisjahbana	Indonesia	2018–present
10	Shamshad Akhtar	Pakistan	2014–2018
9	Noeleen Heyzer	Singapore	2007–2014
8	Kim Hak-su	Republic of Korea	2000–2007
7	Adrianus Mooy	Indonesia	1995–2000
6	Rafeeuddin Ahmed	Pakistan	1992–1994
5	Shah A M S Kibria	Bangladesh	1981–1992
4	J. B. P. Maramis	Indonesia	1973–1981
3	U Nyun	Myanmar	1959–1973
2	Chakravarthi V. Narasimhan	India	1956–1959
1	Palamadai S. Lokanathan	India	1947–1956

== Themes and programmes ==
=== Implementing Sustainable Development Goals ===
The road map of ESCAP on coherent implementation of the Sustainable Development Goals has not prioritized specific SDGs, but rather it has identified priority areas. Third-party consultations have fed into this road map, which also aimed to activate third parties, such as UN funds, specialized agencies, and regional organizations, to provide more support to Member States. The commission furthermore engages with other regional actors to link their agendas to the SDGs. One example is the Association of Southeast Asian Nations (ASEAN) Community Vision 2025. However, regional agendas outside the SDG framework are continually evolving, as exemplified by the new ASEAN Recovery Framework and ASEAN’s Vision 2040.

ESCAP has also established novel tools to structure its support to its member states and others. Examples include ESCAP’s SDG Rapid Response facility, used for individual and shared support requests, and its SDG Helpdesk, which offers a platform with tools, knowledge products, expertise, good practices, advice, opportunities for peer learning, and regional South-South Cooperation. ESCAP also seeks to create interaction between debtors and creditors with a focus on the small island states in the Pacific. To date, this has been done through a Regional Debt Conference, rather than some more permanent tool.

== See also ==
- United Nations System
- United Nations Economic and Social Commission for Western Asia
- United Nations Economic Commission for Europe (overlapping membership)
- United Nations Economic Commission for Latin America and the Caribbean (overlapping membership)
- Trans-Asian Railway Network Agreement
- Asian Highway Network
