= Sofjan Wanandi =

Indonesian businessman

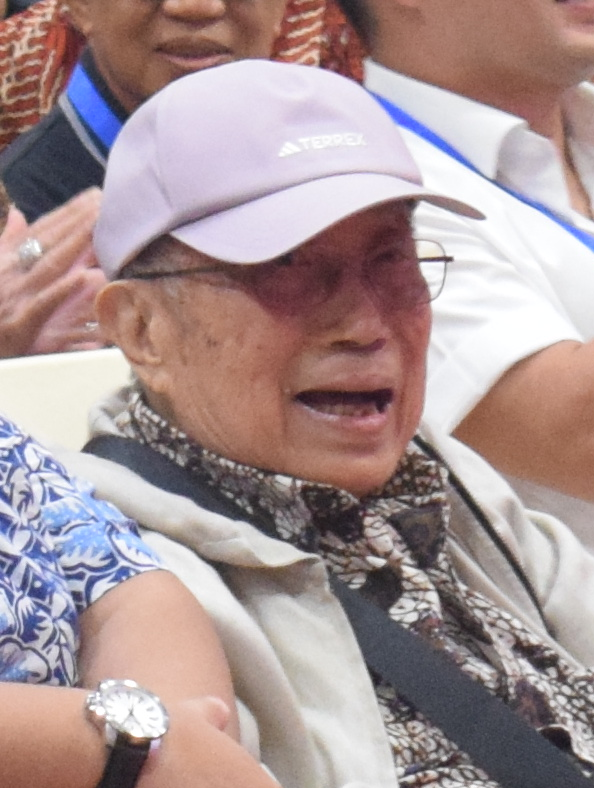
Sofjan Wanandi

Sofjan Wanandi, a.k.a. Lim Bian Khoen (Chinese: 林綿坤; pinyin: Lín Miánkūn; born March 3, 1941) is an Indonesian businessman and the majority owner of Santini Group. Born in Sawahlunto, West Sumatra, he is the brother of Jusuf Wanandi, a senior politician and one of the founders of the CSIS think tank in Jakarta.

An anti-communist activist during the 1965-1966 period in Indonesia, Wanandi has been active in business, government, and politics.

== Career and education ==
While studying at the University of Indonesia, Wanandi became the chairman of the Catholic Student Association of the Republic of Indonesia (PMKRI). Following the alleged coup attempt by the Indonesian Communist Party (PKI) in Indonesia, he was involved in the campaign to suppress PKI. He later became chairman of WE continue with Jaya.

Even prior to the coup attempt, he was active in efforts to oppose PKI's growing influence. As one of the leaders of the Indonesian Students Action Union, his political activism resulted in brief detention by the Sukarno government. He was released after five days in jail.

After Suharto took power from Sukarno, Wanandi joined Suharto's political vehicle, Golkar. Wanandi was close to Suharto aides Ali Murtopo and Soedjono Hoemardani.

In 1974, Wanandi founded the Pakarti Yoga Group of industrial and trading companies. In 1984, he founded Gemala Group, which in 1994 was reincarnated as Santini Group. In 2008, Santini Group had over 15,000 employees, including those working abroad in Australia and Canada. Wanandi led several large companies such as Tata Vehicle insurance, battery manufacturer PT Yuasa Battery Indonesia, and pharmaceutical manufacturers.

He was elected general chairman of the Indonesian Employers Association (Apindo) for the 2008-2013 period. He had led Apindo in a previous five-year period.

== Honours ==
=== National ===
- Indonesia:
  - Bintang Mahaputera Nararya (2019)

=== Foreign ===
- Japan:
  - Order of the Rising Sun, Gold and Silver Star (2015)
- Sweden:
  - Commander of the Royal Order of the Polar Star (2018)
