= Joop Beek =

Indonesian politician

Josephus Gerardus Beek SJ (12 March 1917 in Amsterdam – 17 September 1983 in Jakarta) was a Dutch and later Indonesian Jesuit, priest, educator and advisor. From approximately 1965 until approximately 1975 he was a prominent, though secretive, political consultant to the Indonesian president Suharto.

== Early career ==
Joop Beek grew up in Amsterdam, in a working-class family with Indonesian connections. In 1935, he entered the Jesuit order at Mariëndaal in Grave. In 1938 he was transferred to work in a Jesuit college in Yogyakarta, Indonesia. During the Second World War he was interned by the Japanese until 1945, and come liberation he was held for seven more months by the insurgent Indonesians. In 1946, he returned to the Netherlands, to Maastricht, to study for priesthood, was ordained in 1948 and again sent to Yogyakarta in 1952, where he stayed until 1959. In Yogyakarta, he was made prefect of Canisius Secondary Seminary, where he began to take leadership positions in student organizations.

In 1959, Father Beek started work in Jakarta, where he was appointed as national secretary for the Sodality of Our Lady in Indonesia. In Jakarta, he became increasingly convinced of the danger communists posed to Indonesia, especially to the country's Catholics. As secretary, he began organizing ascetic and ideologically charged retreats with his youth groups. Father Beek's forceful personality and strident anti-communism caused clashes with other members of the Jesuit hierarchy in Indonesia, and he was sent on a year-long sabbatical to England in 1960. Upon his return, he was put in charge of an "Information Bureau" to inform Indonesian bishops of the socio-political situation in the country and thus better guide pastoral decisions. He transformed the organization from a mere news bureau to a right-wing think tank, with some going as far as to call the Information Bureau under Beek's leadership an intelligence agency.

== Advisor to Suharto ==
Father Beek's activism drew him into contact with the upper echelons of government in Indonesia, including then-president Sukarno and military figures such as Suharto. A rift with Sukarno developed because of his increasingly communist preferences, drawing him in closer connection to Indonesian military intelligence.

Following the failure of the October 30 Movement, Father Beek's well-organized cadres took to the streets to demonstrate against the Communists. As communists were massacred following the coup attempt, Father Beek became a close advisor to President Suharto. In 1966, he set up an intensive one-month leadership training course named Kasebul (Kaderisasi Sebulan), based on strict ascetic and disciplinarian principles. For each session of the program, thirty young Catholic men were selected from throughout Indonesia to learn organizational and rhetorical skills, compose reports, and reflect on themselves. Kasebul was successful in fostering a generation of militantly anti-communist and anti-Islamic Catholic leaders. Father Beek saw the role of his cadres as being "salt" in Indonesian society; a small part of the overall population, but one with an outsized impact on politics.

Although Father Beek was a secretive figure, his influence in Suharto's government was well known. In one interview, Dutch reporters Aad van den Heuvel and Ed van Westerloo asked the Father whether he knew anything about the subject of an upcoming speech by Suharto. Father Beek allegedly replied "I don't know, I'm still writing it".

With the Indonesian communists out of the picture, Father Beek turned his attention to mitigating the influence of Islam in Indonesian governance. It is alleged that he was the driving force behind the founding of the Golkar Party, in order to represent the non-Islamic middle class and Catholic voters. Father Beek also supported the establishment of the conservative CSIS thinktank by his former student Jusuf Wanandi. Many other students of Father Beek obtained important positions in Indonesian politics and business, including Cosmas Batubara. Beek's position in Indonesian governance was seen as problematic by most other members of the Society of Jesus, and in 1972, the Society attempted to remove him from service in Indonesia altogether. However, Beek refused to leave, threatening the Society that the Indonesian government would take action against the order if his removal came to pass. From the early 1970s, Beek's influence in Suharto's government began to diminish, as the President attempted to secure his power by appealing to reformist Muslims. He died in Jakarta in 1983.

According to some sources, Father Beek voiced remorse for his role in the fall of Sukarno and in Suharto's dictatorship, going as far as to make pilgrimage to Sukarno's gravesite. The degree of Beek's involvement in the New Order, while undeniably prominent, is disputed; scholar Rémy Madinier argues that Beek's influence is exaggerated in contemporary Indonesia by Islamic political interests to back the idea of a "Jesuit conspiracy" trying to eliminate Islam in the country.
