= Sumitro =

Indonesian general (1927–1998)

General (Ret.) Sumitro
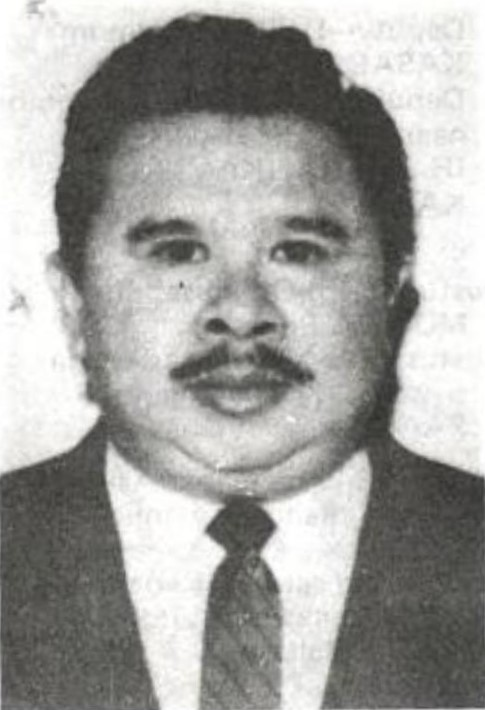

3rd Deputy Commander of the Indonesian National Armed Forces
- In office 9 September 1971 – 2 March 1974
- President: Suharto
- Commander-in-chief: Suharto; Maraden Panggabean
- Preceded by: Maraden Panggabean
- Succeeded by: Surono Reksodimedjo

Personal details
- Born: 13 January 1927 Probolinggo, East Java, Dutch East Indies
- Died: 10 May 1998 (aged 71) Jakarta, Indonesia

Military service
- Allegiance: Empire of Japan; Indonesia
- Branch/service: PETA (1943–1945); Indonesian Army (1945–1974)
- Years of service: 1943–1974
- Rank: General
- Battles/wars: Indonesian National Revolution

Sumitro Sastrodihardjo (Note: Under the old Van Ophuijsen Spelling System his first name was spelled as Soemitro.) (13 January 1927 – 10 May 1998) was a prominent Indonesian general in the early years of General Suharto's New Order before suddenly falling from grace in January 1974 after the Malari incident.

== Early life ==
Sumitro was born in Probolinggo, East Java on 13 January 1925. His father worked as a cashier for the Gending Sugar Factory and was also an activist with the Indonesian National Party whilst his mother was a housewife. As a child, Sumitro grew up at a Pesantren. During the Japanese occupation of the Dutch East Indies, Sumitro joined the Defenders of the Motherland Army (PETA), an auxiliary force set up by the Japanese Imperial Army which consisted of Indonesians with the intention of assisting them should the United States invade Java. Sumitro undertook basic training in Bogor and developed a reputation as a cadet who regularly broke the rules. By 1944, Sumitro had achieved enough to have been appointed a PETA platoon commander at his hometown of Probolinggo.

== Military career ==
After the Indonesian Declaration of Independence, Sumitro formed the People's Security Agency (BKR) militia in Probolinggo before becoming a platoon commander after the official formation of the Indonesian Military on 5 October 1945. By 1948, Sumitro was a Battalion Deputy Commander before being appointed military commander at the city of Malang. After Indonesia's independence had been recognized, Sumitro continued to be stationed in his home Province of East Java, which was now under the supervision of Military Territory (TT) V Brawijaya. Although he still did not have a lot of experience at this stage, Sumitro had already become quite successful. He had successfully applied a guerilla warfare strategy akin to what Orde Wingate did in Burma during the Indonesian National Revolution and he had also been successful in cleaning Sidoarjo, Mojokerto, and Pasuruan from wild militias. For the latter achievement, he was personally thanked by President Sukarno.

In 1952, Sumitro attended the Army Staff and Command College (SSKAD) in Bandung. He became involved with the 17th October Incident where Colonel AH Nasution, the Army Chief of Staff stationed tanks around the Presidential Palace to ask President Sukarno to dismiss the People's Representative Council (DPR). Sumitro recalled that a regiment led by Kemal Idris went after Sumito and other East Javanese officers but failed to capture him. Escaping to East Java, Sumitro was given command over 3 battalions and told to fight for the central Government should the situation spread to the province. The situation settled down and Sumitro went back to Bandung to complete his course.

After SSKAD, Sumitro continued to work his way up the ranks at TT V. In 1952, he was 2nd Assistant to the Commander of TT V, advancing to Regimental Chief of Staff in 1953 and Regimental Commander in 1955. Sumitro then returned to Bandung in 1956, becoming a lecturer at SSKAD and taking an Officers' continuers' course. In 1958, Sumitro left for the United States to attend the United States Army Infantry School at Fort Benning. When he returned to Indonesia, Sumitro was once again stationed in Bandung as Commander of the Infantry Weapons Center. He held the position until 1963 where he became Chairman of the Army Planning Council. In the meantime, Sumitro also took opportunities to further his military education. In 1963, Sumitro attended the ABRI Staff and Command College. He also went abroad again, studying at the Führungsakademie der Bundeswehr in Hamburg, West Germany.

Sumitro's wealth of military education was recognized by his colleagues and they suggested that he try out to become a Commander. Sumitro would always reject the notion but in 1965, he accepted appointment as Commander of Regional Military Command (Kodam) IX/Mulawarman. As Commander of this Kodam, Sumitro was responsible for the security of East Kalimantan. Sumitro quickly developed a reputation as an anti-communist. He arrested officials whose organizations were affiliated with the Indonesian Communist Party (PKI). The news reached Sukarno, who summoned him to Jakarta to reprimand him.

== Transition to the New Order and first years of the New Order ==
In late 1965, Sumitro was transferred from East Kalimantan to Jakarta, where he became a staff member for Major General Suharto, the Commander of the Army. Suharto, who at this stage was on the path to an imminent power struggle with Sukarno, was wooing the support of Army Officers by appointing officers of different ethnicities as part of his staff. Sumitro, alongside Basuki Rahmat represented the East Javanese contingent. For his part, Sumitro stuck by Suharto and did not waver in his support.

By March 1966, the political situation had grown extremely tense. Sumitro recalled a meeting held by Suharto and attended by other Army Officers. During the meeting, Suharto told those who were present that there was a need to separate Sukarno from certain ministers in his cabinet such as Minister of Foreign Affairs Subandrio. Suharto decided to use a cabinet meeting on 11 March 1966 as the occasion in which the arrests could be made and delegated the task of making the arrests to the Army Paracommando Regiment (RPKAD).

For his part, Sumitro was given the task of putting the orders on paper and passing it down to the troops. On 11 March 1966 as the cabinet meeting was held and the RPKAD, masquerading as unidentified troops made their approach, Sumitro was at home. That morning, he received a call from Alamsyah Ratu Prawiranegara, a member of Suharto's personal staff. Alamsyah called on behalf of Suharto, who changed his mind about the arrests and was now ordering Sumitro to withdraw the troops. Sumitro responded that he cannot obey Suharto's orders because it was too late and the operation was already under way. A chain of events then went underway, culminating in Sukarno handing over de facto power to Suharto via Supersemar.

Suharto now sought to further weaken Sukarno's power and began appointing trusted allies as Regional Commanders. In mid-1966, Sumitro returned to East Java after being appointed as Commander of Kodam VIII/Brawijaya. In this position, Sumitro was responsible for the security of East Java. A task of considerable significance when taking into account the political situation at the time and the fact that East Java was Sukarno's home province. Nevertheless, Sumitro once again proved successful, eliminating pro-Sukarno sentiments within his command in late 1966.

After Suharto was appointed Acting President in 1967, Sumitro was transferred back to Jakarta. This time he became Operations Assistant to the Commander of the Army, a position that he held for two years. In 1969, Sumitro became Chief of Staff to the Minister of Defense and Security, a position which was then held by Suharto. A year later, he then became the Deputy Commander of Kopkamtib (Operational Command for the Restoration of Security and Order), the New Order's Secret Police organization.

== Commandership of Kopkamtib and fall from grace ==
Sumitro reached what turned out to be the pinnacle of his military career in 1973 when he was appointed Commander of Kopkamtib and Deputy Commander of ABRI. As Commander of Kopkamtib, Sumitro gained enormous power and was already being dubbed as the "number two person" in charge of Indonesia after Suharto. Sumitro tried to further strengthen his position by trying to appoint a Deputy Kopkamtib Commander of his choosing. But Suharto saw through Sumitro's attention and appointed Admiral Sudomo, a close colleague, as Deputy Kopkamtib Commander.

As Suharto began his second term as president, he did not have the amount of popularity that he had when he took the office from Sukarno. As 1973 wore on, there was increasing displeasure, especially within universities with corruption, the amount of foreign investment in the Indonesian economy, and the power held by Suharto's personal assistants (Aspri). At the same time, a rivalry was developing within the political elite. On one side was Sumitro, who wanted to cut down military involvement in politics and reduce it to a purely professional role. On the other side was Ali Murtopo, who wanted the military to continue being involved with politics and one of the aforementioned Aspri.

Towards the end of 1973, Sumitro began to distance himself from the government. He did not take action against the criticism and dissent directed at the regime although it was well within his brief to do so. Sumitro began holding talks in university campuses and calling for a new leadership. Sumitro also encouraged more criticism of the Aspri. Sumitro's growing power was on display in late 1973 when he intervened to help pass the marriage law. At this occasion, he successfully hammered out a compromise between the Government and Muslim organizations who saw the bill as being too secular.

As 1973 drew to a close, Suharto tried to mediate between Sumitro and Ali through a series of meetings but he did not succeed. For his part, Sumitro only continued to become more provocative in his actions. During the first days of January 1974, he visited Nasution and Sarwo Edhie Wibowo, two Generals who had helped Suharto gain power but has gotten disillusioned with the regime. As 1973 drew to a close, Suharto tried to mediate the two rivals through a series of meetings but he did not succeed.

On 14 January 1974, Japanese Prime Minister Kakuei Tanaka arrived in Jakarta for a visit. Tanaka's visit provided the ideal opportunity for those who are critical of the amount of foreign investment in the Indonesian economy to protest and express their displeasure. On 15 and 16 January however, the protests turned violent and the Malari incident broke out in Jakarta leaving 11 dead, 300 injured, and 775 arrested. After Tanaka left, Sumitro took action and went after the student union of the University of Indonesia (UI). His actions proved too late as he had already been discredited, being viewed as someone who had let the protests get out of hand. Although given Ali's intelligence background, there is a theory that he had sent his agents into the crowd to incite the violence so that Sumitro could be discredited.

Not long after the Malari Incident, Sumitro resigned the Commandership of Kopkamtib and followed it up two months later with his resignation as Deputy Commander of ABRI. Suharto tried to offer him the consolation of being Indonesian Ambassador to the United States, but Sumitro rejected it; preferring instead to retire from military life altogether.

== Post-military career ==
Sumitro spent the next few years in early retirement, spending his time by playing golf. In 1979, he became a businessman by establishing the Rigunas Group and being its Commissioner. Sumitro also unofficially became a political commentator; mainly focusing on the issue of succession. He died in Jakarta on 10 May 1998.

== Miscellaneous ==
Despite his rivalry with him, Sumitro had great respect for Ali, going as far as to claim that Ali would have been a good President.

== Honour ==
=== Foreign honour ===
- Netherlands : Knight-Grand Cross of the Order of Orange-Nassau with Swords of the Netherlands (1971)
- Malaysia : Honorary Commander of the Order of Loyalty to the Crown of Malaysia (P.S.M.) (1971)
