= New Order (Indonesia) =

Government of Indonesia, 1967–1998

- 11 March 1966 – 21 May 1998
Transition to the New Order	Reform era
- Map of Indonesia from 1976 until 1999
- Including: Acting presidency of Suharto
- Leader: Suharto
- Key events: Indonesian mass killings of 1965–66; KAMI mass demonstration; Signing of Supersemar; Acting presidency of Suharto; First inauguration of Suharto; Indonesian–Malaysian orthography reform of 1972; 1973 Flores cyclone; Malari Incident; 1976 Palapa launching; Occupation of East Timor; East Timor genocide; Insurgency in Aceh; Petrus extrajudicial killings; Tanjung Priok massacre 1984; 1992 Flores earthquake and tsunami; 1997 Asian financial crisis; 1998 Indonesian riots; Resignation of Suharto

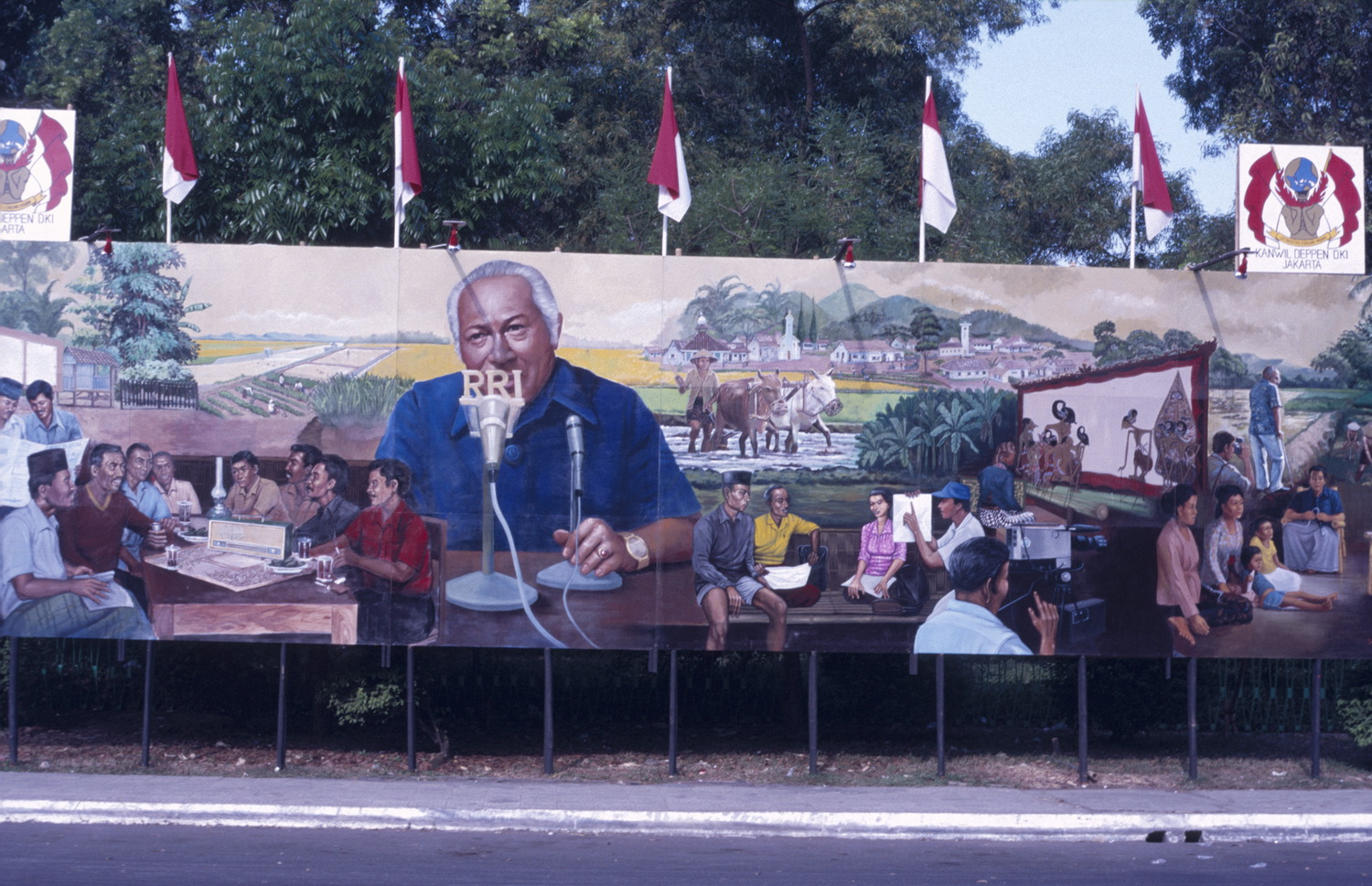
Painting commissioned by the Department of Information on Merdeka Square to commemorate the 40th independence day of Indonesia, 1985

The New Order (Indonesian: Orde Baru, abbreviated Orba) was the regime of the second Indonesian President Suharto from his rise to power in 1966 until his resignation in 1998. Suharto coined the term upon his accession and used it to contrast his presidency with that of his predecessor Sukarno (retroactively dubbed the "Old Order" or Orde Lama).

Immediately following the attempted coup in 1965, the political situation was uncertain, and Suharto's New Order found much popular support from groups wanting a separation from Indonesia's problems since its independence. The 'generation of 66' (Angkatan 66) epitomised talk of a new group of young leaders and new intellectual thought. Following Indonesia's communal and political conflicts, and its economic collapse and social breakdown of the late 1950s through to the mid-1960s, the "New Order" was committed to achieving and maintaining political order, economic development, and the removal of mass participation in the political process. The features of the "New Order" established from the late 1960s were thus a strong political role for the military, the bureaucratisation and corporatisation of political and societal organisations, and selective but brutal repression of opponents. Strident anti-communist, anti-socialist, and anti-Islamist doctrine remained a hallmark of the presidency for its subsequent 30 years.

Within a few years, however, many of its original allies had become indifferent or averse to the New Order, which comprised a military faction supported by a narrow civilian group. Among most members of the pro-democracy movement that forced Suharto to resign in the May 1998 riots and then gained power, the term "New Order" has come to be used pejoratively. It is frequently employed to describe figures who were either tied to the Suharto period, or who upheld the practises of his authoritarian administration, such as corruption, collusion, and nepotism (widely known by the acronym KKN: korupsi, kolusi, nepotisme).

== Background ==
Sukarno was Indonesia's founding president, a position he had held since the republic's formation in 1945. In 1955, the first general parliamentary elections delivered an unstable parliament, and Sukarno's rule became increasingly autocratic from the late 1950s under his "Guided Democracy." Described as the great "dalang," Sukarno’s position depended on his concept of Nasakom (Nationalism, Religion, Communism) whereby he sought to balance the competing Indonesian Military, Islamic groups, and the increasingly powerful Indonesian Communist Party (PKI). To the resentment of the military and Muslim groups, this arrangement became increasingly reliant on the PKI, which had become the country’s strongest political party.

Sukarno's anti-imperial ideology saw Indonesia becoming increasingly dependent on the Soviet Union and China, which was met with indignation from Western countries. The cash-strapped government had to scrap public sector subsidies, annual inflation rose to as high as 1,000%, export revenues were shrinking, infrastructure crumbling, and factories were operating at minimal capacity with negligible investment. Sukarno's administration became increasingly ineffective in providing a viable economic system to lift its citizens out of poverty and hunger. Meanwhile, Sukarno led Indonesia into Konfrontasi, a military confrontation with Malaysia; removed Indonesia from the United Nations; and stepped up revolutionary and anti-Western rhetoric.

By 1965 at the height of the Cold War, the PKI penetrated all levels of government. With the support of Sukarno and the air force, the party gained increasing influence at the expense of the army, thus ensuring the army's enmity. Muslim clerics, many of whom were landowners, felt threatened by the PKI's rural land confiscation actions. The army was alarmed at Sukarno’s support for the PKI’s wish to quickly establish a "fifth force" of armed peasants and labourers, which was first announced by the PKI to a CBS News journalist. Adding to this desperate and fractious nature of Indonesia in the 1960s, a split within the military was fostered by Western countries backing a right-wing faction against a left-wing faction backed by the PKI.

== Overthrow of Sukarno ==
On 30 September 1965, six generals were killed by a group calling themselves the 30 September Movement, who alleged a right-wing plot to kill the president. General Suharto led the army in suppressing the abortive coup attempt. The PKI were quickly blamed, and the army led an anti-communist purge that killed an estimated 500,000 to a million people. Public opinion shifted against Sukarno in part due to his apparent knowledge of, and sympathy for, the events of 30 September, and for his tolerance of leftist and communist elements whom the army blamed for the coup attempt. Student groups, such as KAMI, were encouraged by, and sided with, the army against Sukarno. In March 1966, Suharto secured a presidential decree (known as the Supersemar), which gave him authority to take any action necessary to maintain security. Using the decree, the PKI was banned in March 1966 and the parliament (MPRS), government and military were purged of pro-Sukarno elements, many of whom were accused of being communist sympathisers, and replaced with Suharto supporters.

A June session of the now-purged parliament promulgated a parliamentary resolution irrevocable by Sukarno (Tap MPRS no. XXV/MPRS/1966), that confirmed Suharto's ban of the PKI and simultaneously banned "Communism/Marxism-Leninism" (sic; explicitly defined in the resolution's corresponding explanatory memorandum to include "the struggle fundaments and tactics taught by ... Stalin, Mao Tse Tung, et cetera"), as well as promulgating other resolutions that elevated the Supersemar into a parliamentary resolution also irrevocable by Sukarno, and stripped Sukarno of his title of president for life. In August–September 1966, and against the wishes of Sukarno, the New Order ended Indonesia's confrontation with Malaysia and rejoined the United Nations. Parliament re-convened in March 1967 to impeach the president for his apparent toleration of 30 September Movement and violation of the constitution by promoting PKI's international communist agenda, negligence of the economy, and promotion of national "moral degradation" via his womanising behaviour. In March 1967, the MPRS stripped Sukarno of his remaining power, and Suharto was named acting president. Sukarno was placed under house arrest in Bogor Palace. Little more was heard from him, and he died in June 1970. In March 1968, the MPRS appointed Suharto to the first of his five-year terms as President.

== Consolidation of power ==
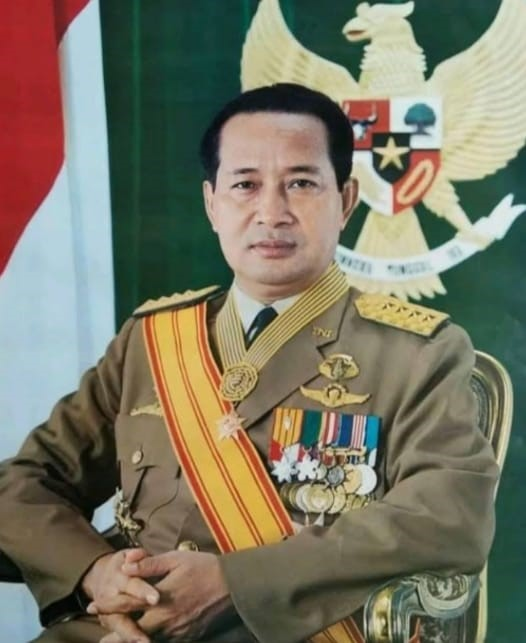
General Suharto

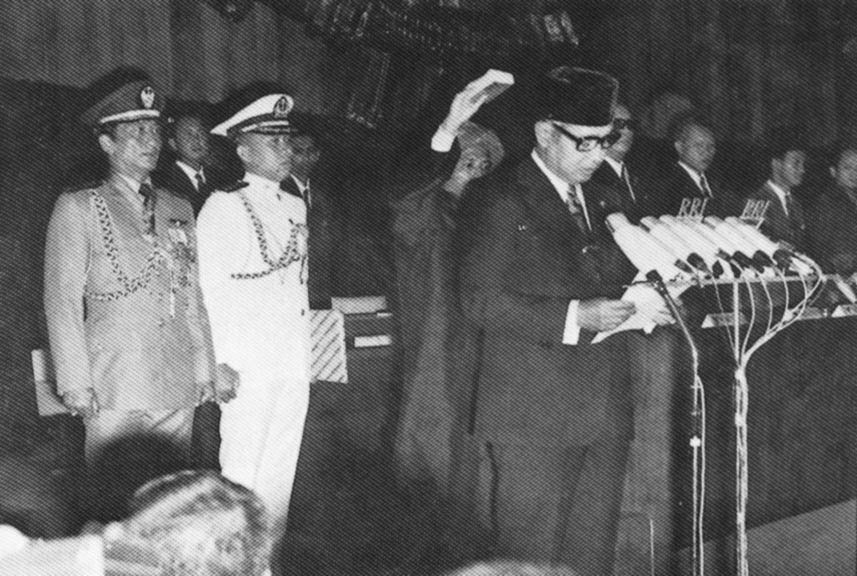
Suharto took the presidential oath of office on 27 March 1968.

The "New Order" was so called to distinguish and "better" itself from Sukarno's "Old Order". Pancasila was promoted as the national ideology, one that pre-dated introduced religions such as Hinduism or Islam. Suharto secured a parliamentary resolution in 1978 (Tap MPR No. II/1978) which obliged all organisations in Indonesia to adhere to Pancasila as a basic principle; he later secured another parliamentary resolution in 1983 (Tap MPR No. II/1983) which prohibited all organizations from adhering to any principles except Pancasila, a policy known as Pancasila sole principle (asas tunggal Pancasila). He instituted a Pancasila indoctrination program that was mandatory for all Indonesians, from primary school students to office workers. Pancasila, a rather vague and generalist set of principles originally formulated by Sukarno in 1945, was vigorously promoted as a sacrosanct national ideology which represented the ancient wisdom of the Indonesian people even before the entry of foreign-based religions such as Hinduism or Islam. In a July 1982 speech that reflected his deep infatuation with Javanese beliefs, Suharto glorified Pancasila as a key to reaching the perfect life (ilmu kasampurnaning hurip) of harmony with God and fellow mankind. In practice, however, the vagueness of Pancasila was exploited by Suharto's government to justify their actions and to condemn their opponents as "anti-Pancasila".

The Dwifungsi ("Dual Function") policy allowed the military to have an active role in all levels of Indonesian government, economy, and society.

=== Neutralisation of internal dissent ===
Having been appointed president, Suharto still needed to share power with various elements, including Indonesian generals who considered Suharto as mere primus inter pares as well as Islamic and student groups who participated in the anti-communist purge. Suharto, aided by his "Office of Personal Assistants" (Aspri) clique of military officers from his days as commander of Diponegoro Division, particularly Ali Murtopo, began to systematically cement his hold on power by subtly sidelining potential rivals while rewarding loyalists with political position and monetary incentives.

Having successfully stood-down MPRS chairman General Nasution's 1968 attempt to introduce a bill which would have severely curtailed presidential authority, Suharto had him removed from his position as MPRS chairman in 1969 and forced his early retirement from the military in 1972. In 1967, generals HR Dharsono, Kemal Idris, and Sarwo Edhie Wibowo (dubbed "New Order Radicals") opposed Suharto's decision to allow the participation of existing political parties in elections in favour of a non-ideological two-party system somewhat similar to those found in many Western countries. Suharto then proceeded to send Dharsono overseas as ambassador, while Kemal Idris and Sarwo Edhie Wibowo were sent to distant North Sumatra and South Sulawesi as regional commanders.

While many original leaders of the 1966 student movement (Angkatan 66) were successfully co-opted into the regime, it faced large student demonstrations challenging the legitimacy of the 1971 elections, the Golput Movement, the costly construction of Taman Mini Indonesia Indah theme park (1972), the domination of foreign capitalists (Malari Incident of 1974), and the lack of term limits of Suharto's presidency (1978). The New Order responded by imprisoning student activists and sending army units to occupy the campus of the Bandung Institute of Technology in 1978. In April 1978, Suharto ended the campus unrest by issuing a decree on the "Normalization of Campus Life" (NKK) which prohibited political activities on-campus not related to academic pursuits.

In 1980, fifty prominent political figures—including Nasution—signed the Petition of Fifty which criticised Suharto's use of Pancasila to silence his critics. Suharto refused to address the petitioners' concerns, and some of them were imprisoned with others having restrictions imposed on their movements.

=== Domestic politics and security ===
==== Depoliticization ====
To placate demands from civilian politicians for the holding of elections, as manifested in MPRS resolutions of 1966 and 1967, Suharto government formulated a series of laws regarding elections as well as the structure and duties of parliament which were passed by MPRS in November 1969 after protracted negotiations. The law provided for a parliament (Madjelis Permusjawaratan Rakjat/MPR) with the power to elect presidents consisting of a lower house (Dewan Perwakilan Rakjat/DPR) as well as regional and groups representatives. 100 of the 460 members of DPR were soldiers of the Republic of Indonesia Armed Forces (ABRI)—mostly Indonesian Army soldiers—directly appointed by the government as part of Dwifungsi, while the remaining seats were allocated to political parties based on results of a general election. This mechanism ensures significant government control over legislative affairs, particularly the appointment of presidents.

To participate in the elections, Suharto realised the need to align himself with a political party. After initially considering alignment with Sukarno's old party, the PNI, in 1969 Suharto took control of an obscure military-run federation of NGOs called Golkar ("Functional Group") and transform it into his electoral vehicle under the co-ordination of his right-hand man Ali Murtopo. The first general election was held on 3 July 1971 with ten participants: Golkar, four Islamic parties, as well as five nationalist and Christian parties. Campaigning on a non-ideological platform of "development", and aided by official government support and subtle intimidation tactics. Golkar secured 62.8% of the popular vote. The March 1973 general session of the MPR promptly appointed Suharto to a second term in office with Sultan Hamengkubuwono IX as vice-president.

On 5 January 1973, to allow better control, the government forced the four Islamic parties to merge into the PPP (Partai Persatuan Pembangunan/United Development Party) while the five non-Islamic parties were fused into PDI (Partai Demokrasi Indonesia/Indonesian Democratic Party). The government ensured that these parties never developed effective opposition by controlling their leadership, while establishing the "re-call" system to remove any outspoken legislators from their positions. Using this system dubbed the "Pancasila Democracy", Golkar won the MPR general elections of 1977, 1982, 1987, 1992, and 1997 with massive landslides. The elected MPR then proceeded to unanimously re-elect Suharto as president in 1978, 1983, 1988, 1993, and 1998.

==== Establishment of corporative groups ====
Suharto and Home Minister Amir Machmud founded KORPRI in 1971 to enforce "monoloyalty" policy within the civil service and government-owned enterprises, which contributed to Golkar's victory in every election during the New Order era. This emblem was designed by a Lyricist painter in 1973 and adopted by KORPRI the same year.

Suharto proceeded with social engineering projects designed to transform Indonesian society into a de-politicized "floating mass" supportive of the national mission of "development", a concept similar to corporatism. The government formed civil society groups to unite the populace in support of government programs. For instance, the government created and required all civil servants and employees of state- and local government-owned enterprises and those of Bank Indonesia to join KORPRI (the Employees' Corps of the Republic of Indonesia) in November 1971 to ensure their loyalty; (Note: KORPRI still exists today and all civil servants are still required to join the corps.) organised the FBSI (Federasi Buruh Seluruh Indonesia) as the only legal labour union for workers not eligible for KORPRI membership in February 1973 (later renamed as SPSI/Serikat Pekerja Seluruh Indonesia in 1985), established under the pretext of tripartism, officially defined as Pancasilaist Industrial Relations (Indonesian: Hubungan Industrial Pancasila) (while in fact it cements only business interests with the state); and established the MUI (Majelis Ulama Indonesia) in 1975 to control Islamic clerics. In 1966 to 1967, to promote assimilation of the influential Chinese Indonesians, the Suharto government passed several laws as part of the so-called "Basic Policy for the Solution of Chinese Problem", whereby only one Chinese-language publication (controlled by the army) was allowed to continue, all Chinese cultural and religious expressions (including display of Chinese characters) were prohibited from public space, Chinese schools were phased out, and the ethnic Chinese were encouraged to take Indonesian-sounding names. Furthermore, Chinese Indonesians are also subject to the Certificate of Citizenship in order to enter an academy, obtain a passport, register for an election, and to get married. In 1968, Suharto commenced the very successful family planning program (Keluarga Berentjana/KB) to stem the huge population growth rate and hence increase per-capita income. A lasting legacy from this period is the spelling reform of Indonesian language decreed by Suharto on 17 August 1972.

==== "State Ibuism" ====
Inspired by Javanese culture of priyayi, the New Order, during its consolidation era, was antifeminist and patriarchic, officially defined as "familyism" (Indonesian: kekeluargaan). On 5 August 1974, President Suharto established civil servant wives' corps Dharma Wanita, organized under the doctrine of "Five Women's Dharma" (Indonesian: Pancadharma Wanita), an antifeminist, patriarchic doctrine similar to Nazi Germany's Kinder, Küche, Kirche); a "Family Welfare Training" programme (Indonesian: Pembinaan Kesejahteraan Keluarga, PKK), which was rooted on a 1957 conference on home economics in Bogor, was made compulsory in 1972, especially on rural regencies.

It wasn't until 1980 that feminism would gain an uprising with the establishment of several foundations, for example the Annisa Shanti foundation (Yasanti).

==== Political stability ====
Suharto relied on the military to ruthlessly maintain domestic security, organised by the Kopkamtib (Operation Command for the Restoration of Security and Order) and BAKIN (State Intelligence Coordination Agency). To maintain strict control over the country, Suharto expanded the army's territorial system down to the village level, while military officers were appointed as regional heads under the rubric of the Dwifungsi ("Dual Function") of the military. By 1969, 70% of Indonesia's provincial governors and more than half of its district chiefs were active military officers. Suharto authorised Operasi Trisula which destroyed PKI remnants trying to organise a guerrilla base in the Blitar area in 1968 and ordered several military operations which ended the communist PGRS-Paraku insurgency in West Kalimantan (1967–1972). Attacks on oil workers by the first incarnation of Free Aceh Movement separatists under Hasan di Tiro in 1977 led to dispatch of small special forces detachments who quickly either killed or forced the movement's members to flee abroad. Notably, in March 1981, Suharto authorised a successful special forces mission to end hijacking of a Garuda Indonesia flight by Islamic extremists at Don Muang Airport in Bangkok.

To comply with the New York Agreement of 1962 which required a plebiscite on integration of West Irian into Indonesia before end of 1969, the Suharto government began organising for a so-called "Act of Free Choice" (PEPERA) scheduled on July–August 1969. The government sent RPKAD special forces under Sarwo Edhie Wibowo which secured the surrender of several bands of the former Dutch-organized militia (Papoea Vrijwilligers Korps/ PVK) at large in the jungles since the Indonesian takeover in 1963, while sending Catholic volunteers under Jusuf Wanandi to distribute consumer goods to promote pro-Indonesian sentiments. In March 1969, it was agreed that the plebiscite will be channelled via 1,025 tribal chiefs, citing the logistical challenge and political ignorance of the population. Using the above strategy, the plebiscite produced a unanimous decision for integration with Indonesia, which was duly noted by United Nations General Assembly in November 1969.

=== Political Islam ===
Under Suharto, political Islamists were suppressed and religious Muslims were carefully watched by the Indonesian government. Several Christian Generals who served under Suharto like Leonardus Benjamin Moerdani actively persecuted religious Muslims in the Indonesian armed forces, which was described as being "anti-Islamic", denying religious Muslims promotions, and preventing them from praying in the barracks and banning them from even using the Islamic greeting As-salamu alaykum, and these anti-Islamic policies were entirely supported by Suharto, despite Suharto being a Muslim himself, since he considered political Islam a threat to his power. The Christian General Theo Syafei, who also served under Suharto, spoke out against political Islam coming to power in Indonesia, and insulted the Qur'an and Islam in remarks which were described as Islamophobic. Furthermore, the hijab was banned from 1982 to 1991 in state schools. Although prohibition ended in 1991, wearing hijab in public was still seen as taboo until the 2000s.

=== Economy ===
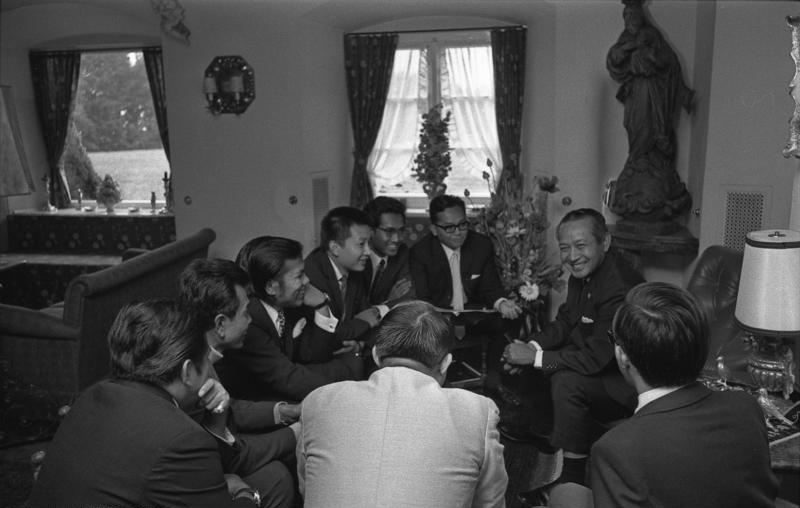
Suharto on a visit to West Germany in 1970.

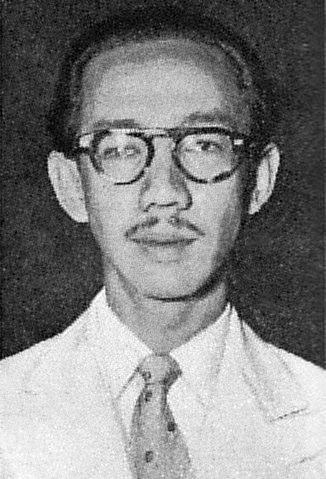
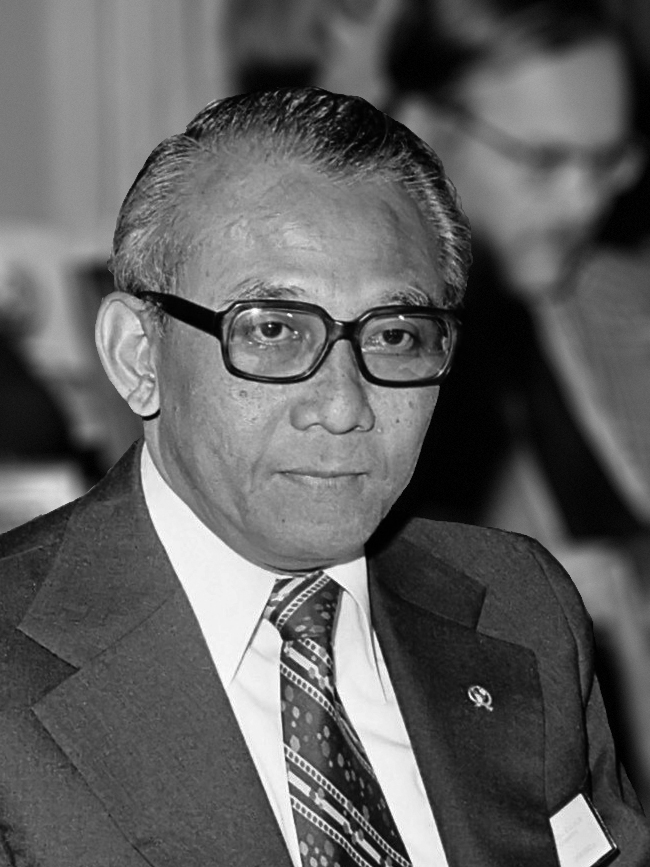
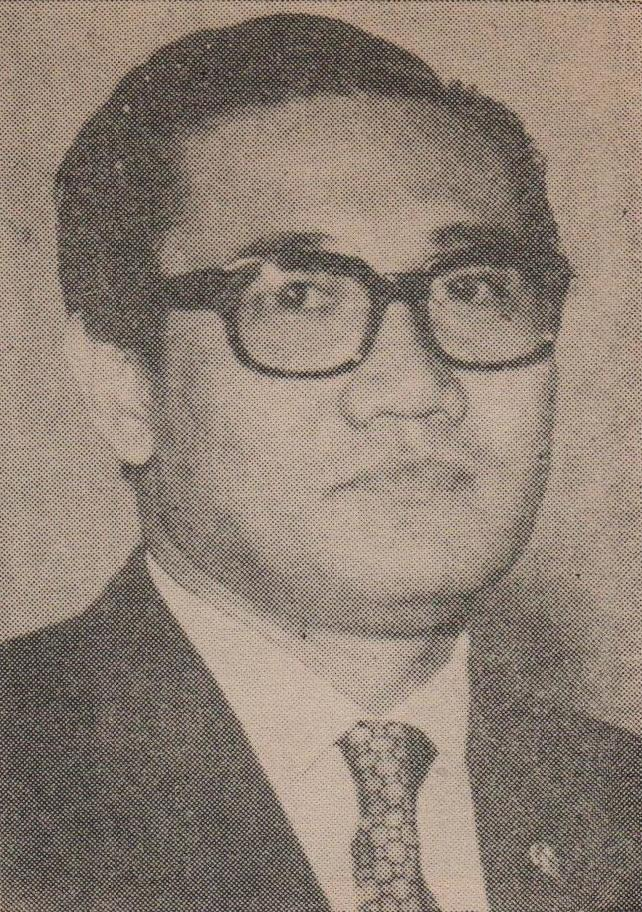
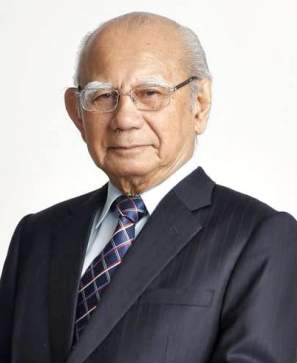
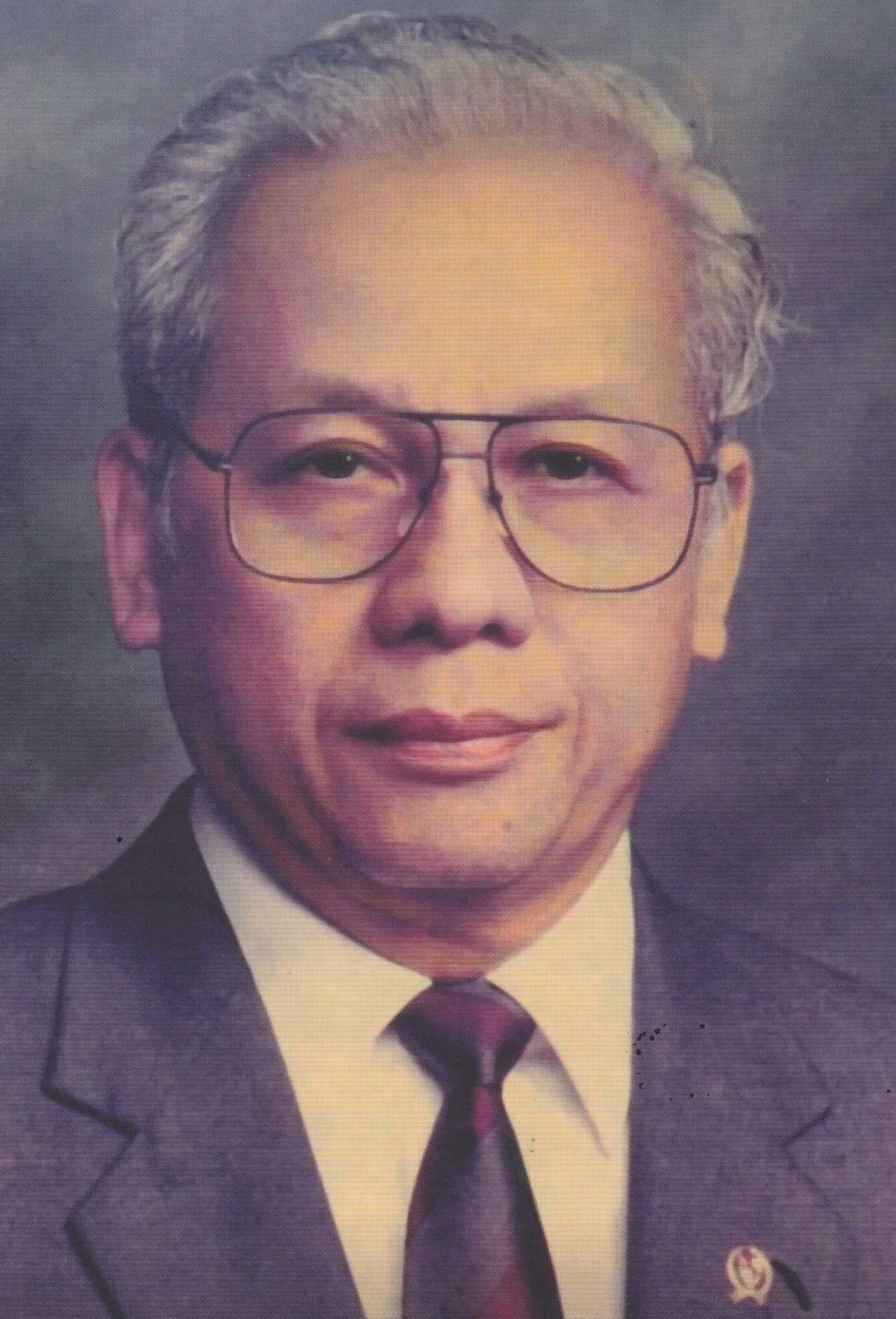
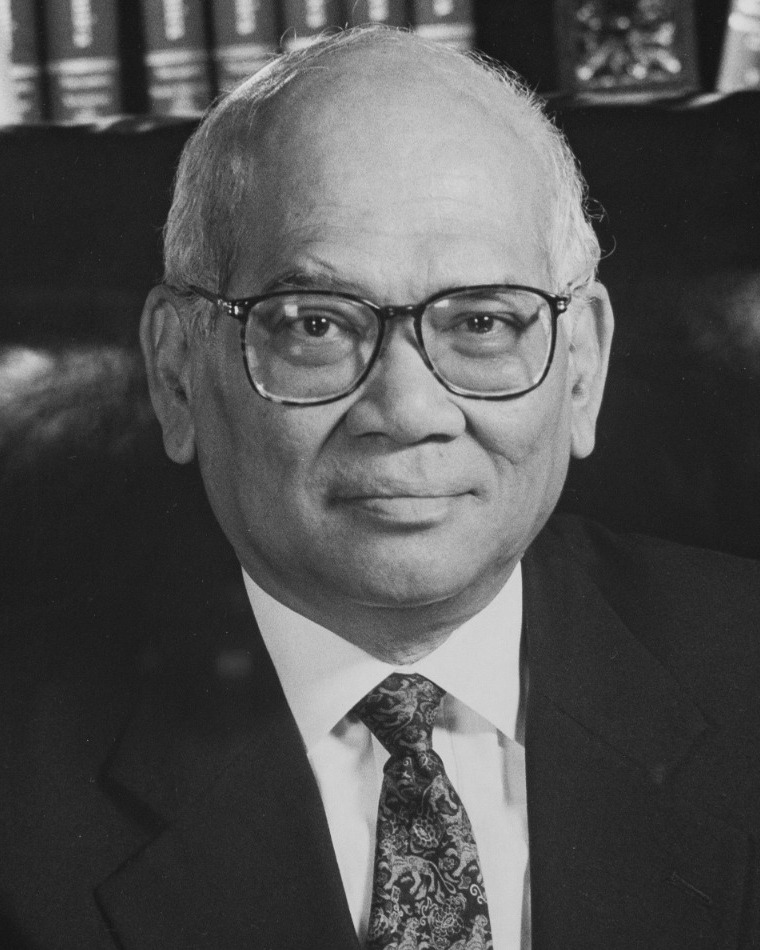
The economists who are considered members of the "Berkeley Mafia."

The new president enlisted a group of mostly American-educated Indonesian economists, dubbed the "Berkeley Mafia", to formulate government economic policy. By cutting subsidies and government debt, and reforming the exchange rate mechanism, inflation dropped from 660% in 1966 to 19% in 1969. The threat of famine was alleviated by influx of USAID rice aid shipments in 1967 to 1968.

Realizing the dearth of domestic capital capable of re-juvenating growth, Suharto reversed Sukarno's economic autarky policies by opening selected economic sectors of the country to foreign investment under the new Foreign Investment Law of January 1967 (containing generous tax holidays and free movement of money). Suharto himself travelled to Western Europe and Japan in a series of trips to promote investment into Indonesia, starting in the natural resources sector. Among the first foreign investors to re-enter Indonesia were mining companies Freeport Sulphur Company and International Nickel Company, later followed by significant investment from Japanese, South Korean, and Taiwanese companies. British-owned businesses nationalized by the Sukarno administration as part of Konfrontasi (including then-dual-listed Unilever and the British part of also-then-dual-listed Royal Dutch/Shell) were reprivatized; however, Dutch companies originally nationalized in the late 1950s-early 1960s (including but not limited to Hollandsche Beton Groep, (Note: Returned in 1970 as Decorient Indonesia; became consolidated subsidiary of HBG in 1977, and was retained by Royal BAM Group following its acquisition of HBG in 2002, until a management buyout in 2021) NILLMIJ (by 1969 merged into Ennia, now Aegon), and the Dutch part of Royal Dutch/Shell) were not reprivatized due to nationalist sentiments. From 1967, the government managed to secure low-interest foreign aid from ten countries grouped under the Inter-Governmental Group on Indonesia (IGGI) to cover its budget deficit.

Suharto's government issued the Domestic Investment Law of June 1968 to allow development of a domestic capitalist class capable of motoring economic growth to supplement existing state-owned enterprises. The late 1960s and early 1970s saw emergence of domestic entrepreneurs (mostly Chinese-Indonesians) in the import-substitution light-manufacturing sector such as Astra Group and Salim Group.

Flush with IGGI foreign aid and later the jump in oil exports during the 1973 oil crisis, the government began a series of large-scale intensive investment in infrastructure under a series of five-year plans (Rencana Pembangunan Lima Tahun / REPELITA):

- REPELITA I (1969–1974) focusing on agricultural improvements (Green Revolution) to ensure food security
- REPELITA II (1974–1979) focusing on infrastructure on islands outside Java and growth in primary industries
- REPELITA III (1979–1984) focusing on achieving food self-sufficiency and growth in export-oriented labour-intensive industry
- REPELITA IV (1984–1989) focusing on growth in capital-good manufacturing
- REPELITA V (1989–1994) focusing on growth in telecommunications, education, and transportation infrastructure
- REPELITA VI (1994–1998, unfinished) focusing on infrastructure to support foreign investment and free trade

While establishing a formal economy based on rational and sound macroeconomic policies, Suharto continued his past modus operandi of creating a vast network of charitable organisations ("yayasan") run by the military and his family members, which extracted "donations" from domestic and foreign enterprises in exchange for necessary government support and permits. While some proceeds of these organisations were used for genuinely charitable purposes (such as building a heart-disease hospital by Yayasan Harapan Kita run by the first lady), most of the money was recycled as slush funds to reward political allies to maintain support for Suharto's presidency.

In February 1975, the state oil company Pertamina was forced to default on its US$15 billion in loans from American and Canadian creditors. The company's director, General Ibnu Sutowo (a close ally of Suharto), invested the windfall income from rising oil prices into a myriad of other business activities such as shipping, steel, construction, real estate, and hospitals. These businesses were mismanaged and riddled with corruption. The government was forced to bail out the company, in the process nearly doubling the national debt, while Ibnu Sutowo was removed from his position.

=== Foreign policy ===
Suharto attends 1970 meeting of the Non-Aligned Movement in Lusaka, Zambia.

Indonesia's territorial extent in 1978, including East Timor

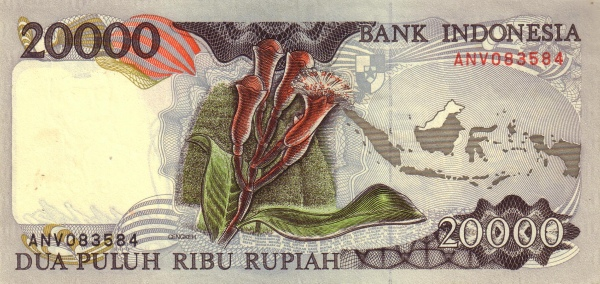
Indonesia's maximum territorial extent as depicted on the Rp20,000 banknote issued in 1992. The map shows the whole of Borneo, including areas belonging to Brunei and Malaysia, though these regions were left uncoloured.

Upon assuming power, Suharto government adopted a policy of neutrality in the Cold War with quiet alignment with the Western bloc (including Japan and South Korea) with the objective of securing support for Indonesia's economic recovery. Western countries, impressed by Suharto's strong anti-communist credentials, were quick to offer their support. Diplomatic relations with the People's Republic of China were suspended in October 1967 due to suspicion of Chinese involvement in 30 September Movement (diplomatic relations were only restored in 1990). Due to Suharto's destruction of PKI the Soviet Union embargoed military sales to Indonesia. However, from 1967 to 1970 foreign minister Adam Malik managed to secure several agreements to restructure massive debts incurred by Sukarno from the Soviet Union and other Eastern European communist states. Regionally, having ended confrontation with Malaysia in August 1966, Indonesia became a founding member of the Association of Southeast Asian Nations (ASEAN) in August 1967. This organisation is designed to establish a peaceful relationship between Southeast Asian countries free from conflicts such as the ongoing Vietnam War.

In 1974, the neighbouring colony of Portuguese Timor descended into civil war after the withdrawal of Portuguese authority following the Carnation Revolution, whereby the leftist-leaning Fretilin (Frente Revolucionária de Timor-Leste Independente) emerged triumphant. After persuasion from Western countries (including from US president Gerald R. Ford and Australian prime minister Gough Whitlam during their visits to Indonesia), Suharto decided to intervene to prevent establishment of a communist state. After an unsuccessful attempt of covert support to Timorese anti-communist groups UDT and APODETI, Suharto authorised a full-scale invasion of the colony on 7 December 1975 followed with its official annexation as Indonesia's 27th province of East Timor in July 1976. The "encirclement and annihilation" campaigns of 1977–1979 broke the back of Fretilin control over the hinterlands, although continuing guerilla resistance forced the government to maintain strong military presence in the half-island until 1999. An estimated minimum of 90,800 and maximum of 213,600 conflict-related deaths occurred in East Timor during Indonesian rule (1974–1999); namely, 17,600–19,600 killings and 73,200 to 194,000 'excess' deaths from hunger and illness. Indonesian forces were responsible for about 70% of the violent killings.

== Apex of power ==
=== Socio-economic progress and growing corruption ===
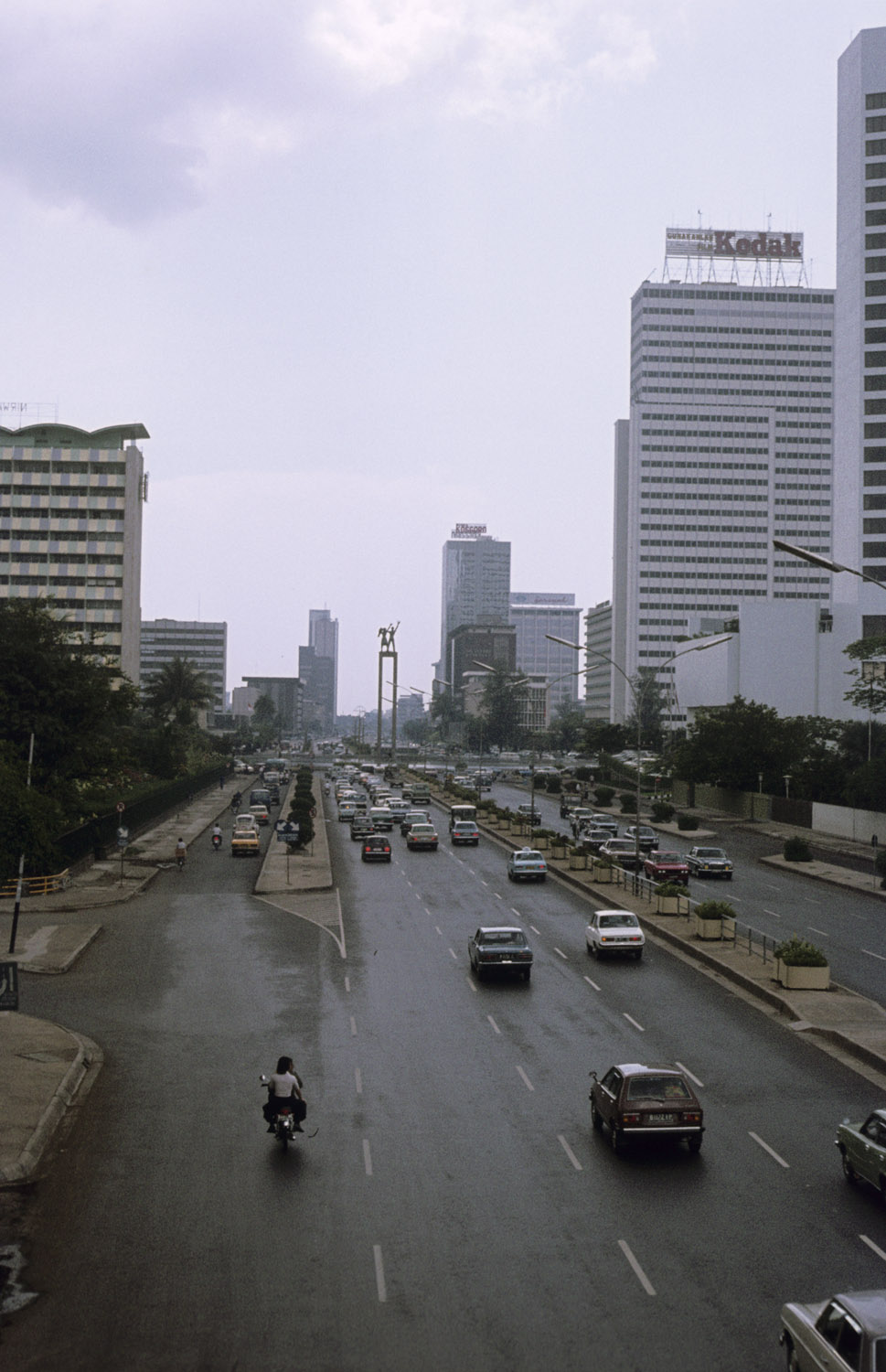
Jakarta in the 1980s

By 1996, Indonesia's poverty rate had dropped to around 11% compared with 45% in 1970 according to some studies, though this claim of poverty reduction is debatable and many studies indicate that poverty was much higher than claimed, with as many as 50% of Indonesians living on a dollar PPP a day or less. From 1966 to 1997, Indonesia recorded real GDP growth of 5.03% per year, pushing real GDP per capita upwards from US$806 to US$4,114. In 1966, the manufacturing sector made up less than 10% of GDP (mostly industries related to oil and agriculture). By 1997, manufacturing had risen to 25% of GDP, and 53% of exports consisted of manufactured products. The government invested into massive infrastructure development (notably the launch of the Palapa telecommunication satellites); consequently Indonesian infrastructure in the mid-1990s was considered on par with China's. Suharto was keen to capitalise on such achievements to justify his presidency, and an MPR resolution in 1983 granted him the title of "Father of Development".

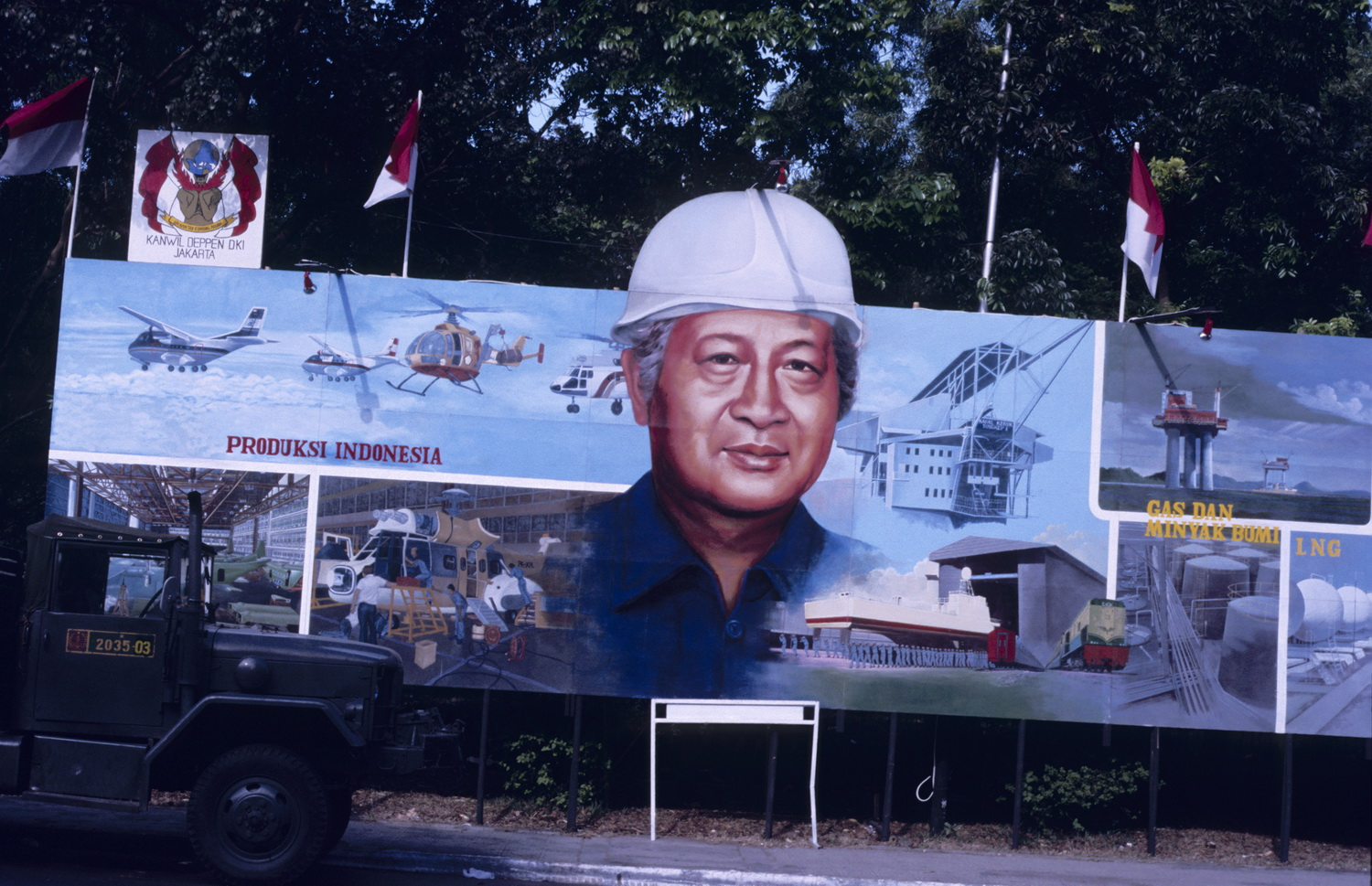
Indonesian propaganda painting promoting Suharto's cult of personality, portraying him as the "Father of Development" and symbolising the progress attributed to the New Order regime.

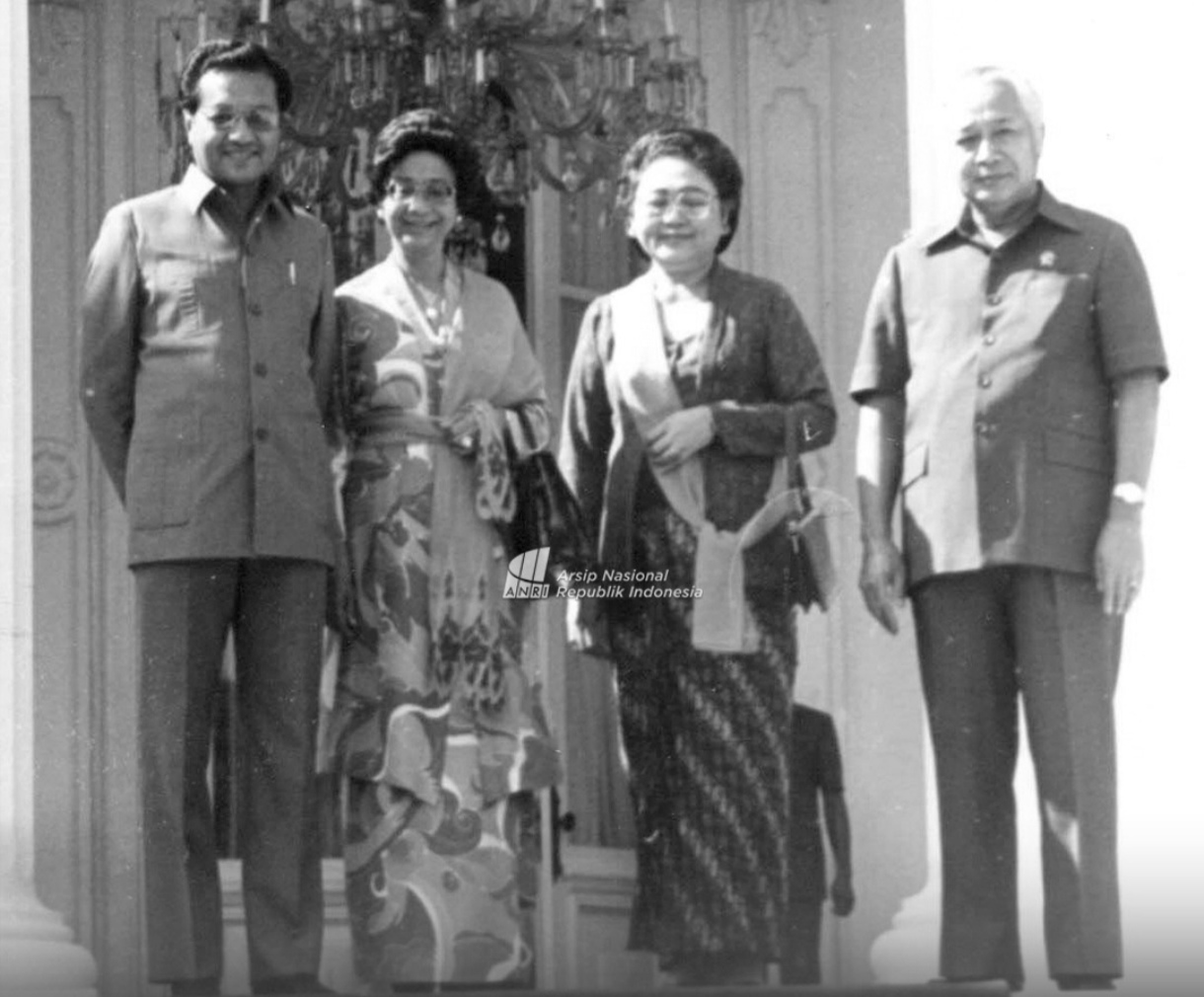
Suharto and First Lady Siti Hartinah welcoming Malaysian Prime Minister Mahathir Mohamad and his wife, Siti Hasmah, at Istana Negara in Jakarta during an official visit on 16 March 1985.

Suharto's health-care programs (such as the Puskesmas program) increased life expectancy from 47 years (1966) to 67 years (1997) and cut the infant mortality rate by more than 60%. The government's Bantuan Pembangunan Sekolah Dasar program, better known as SD Inpres and launched in 1973, resulted in the primary-school enrollment ratio reaching 90% by 1983 while almost eliminating the education gap between boys and girls. Sustained support for agriculture resulted in Indonesia reaching rice self-sufficiency by 1984, an unprecedented achievement which earned Suharto a gold medal from the FAO in November 1985.

In the early 1980s, Suharto responded to the fall in oil exports due to the 1980s oil glut by successfully shifting the main pillar of the economy into export-oriented labour-intensive manufacturing, made globally competitive by Indonesia's low wages and a series of currency devaluations. Industrialization was mostly undertaken by ethnic-Chinese companies, which evolved into immense conglomerates, dominating the nation's economy. The largest conglomerates are the Salim Group, led by Liem Sioe Liong (Sudono Salim), the Sinar Mas Group, led by Oei Ek Tjong (Eka Tjipta Widjaja), the Astra Group, led by Tjia Han Poen (William Soeryadjaya), the Lippo Group, led by Lie Mo Tie (Mochtar Riady), the Barito Pacific Group, led by Pang Djun Phen (Prajogo Pangestu), and the Nusamba Group, led by Bob Hasan. Suharto decided to support the growth of a small number of Chinese-Indonesian conglomerates since they could not challenge his rule due to their ethnic-minority status, and, based on past experience, he thought that they possessed the skills and capital needed to create real growth for the country. In exchange for Suharto's patronage, the conglomerates provided vital financing for his "regime maintenance" activities.

In the late 1980s, the Suharto government decided to de-regulate the banking sector to encourage savings and provide a domestic source of financing required for growth. Suharto decreed the "October Package of 1988" (PAKTO 88), which eased requirements for establishing banks and extending credit, resulting in a 50% increase in number of banks from 1989 to 1991. To promote savings, the government introduced the TABANAS (Tabungan Pembangunan Nasional, National Development Savings) program to the populace. The Jakarta Stock Exchange, originally opened in 1912 as the Batavia (later Jakarta) branch of the Amsterdam Stock Exchange (now Euronext Amsterdam) and re-opened in 1977, performed strongly due to a spree of domestic IPOs and an influx of foreign funds after deregulation in 1990. The sudden availability of credit fuelled strong economic growth in the early 1990s, but weak regulation of the financial sector sowed the seeds of the catastrophic crisis in 1997 which eventually led to Suharto's resignation.

The growth of the economy was coincided by rapid expansion in corruption, collusion, and nepotism (Korupsi, Kolusi, dan Nepotisme / KKN). In the early 1980s, Suharto's children, particularly Siti Hardiyanti Rukmana ("Tutut"), Hutomo Mandala Putra ("Tommy"), and Bambang Trihatmodjo, grew increasingly venal and corrupt. Their companies were given lucrative government contracts and protected from market competition by monopolies. Examples include the Jakarta Inner Ring Road, which Tutut had a majority (75% at one time) stake through her PT Citra Lamtoro Gung Persada subsidiary PT Citra Marga Nusaphala Persada; the national car project, monopolized by Bambang and Tommy (through the Bimantara Group (now MNC Group)'s joint venture with the Hyundai Motor Company, and Timor Putra Nasional's joint venture with Kia Motors, respectively); the clove industry, monopolized by a Tommy-linked governmental body called the Clove Buffering and Marketing Administration (Indonesian: Badan Penyangga dan Pemasaran Cengkeh, BPPC); and even the cinema market (and furthermore, all imports of films distributed by the American major film studios), monopolised by 21 Cineplex, owned by Suharto's cousin Sudwikatmono's Subentra Group (now Indika Group). The family was said to have controlled about 36,000 km^{2} of real estate in Indonesia, including 100,000 m^{2} of prime office space in Jakarta and nearly 40% of the land in East Timor. Additionally, Suharto's family members received free shares in 1,251 of Indonesia's most lucrative domestic companies (mostly run by Suharto's ethnic-Chinese cronies), while foreign-owned companies were encouraged to establish "strategic partnerships" with Suharto family's companies. Meanwhile, the myriad yayasans run by Suharto family grew even larger, levying millions of dollars in "donations" from the public and private sectors each year.

=== Grip on power ===
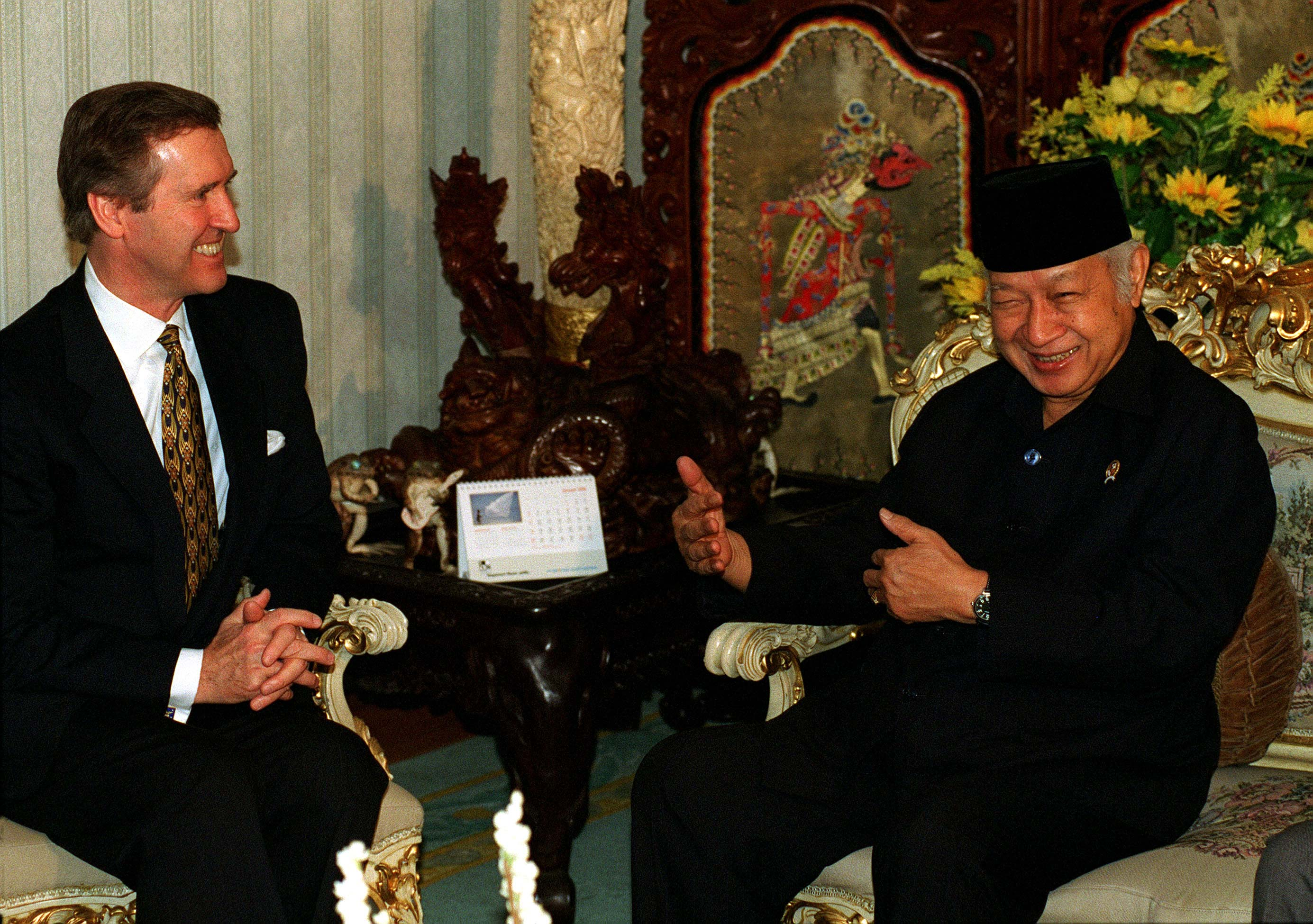
Suharto with US Secretary of Defense William Cohen, 14 January 1998.

By the 1980s, Suharto's grip on power was very strong, maintained by strict control over civil society, engineered elections, liberal use of the military's coercive powers, and a strong economy. Upon his retirement from the military in June 1976, Suharto undertook a re-organization of the armed forces that concentrated power away from commanders to the president. In March 1983, he appointed General Leonardus Benjamin Moerdani as head of the armed forces. A tough and capable soldier, Moerdani was also a Roman Catholic, which precluded him from posing a political threat to Suharto.

Suharto ruthlessly suppressed elements that disturbed the tranquility of the New Order society. From 1983 to 1985, army death squads murdered up to 10,000 suspected criminals in response to a spike in crime rate (dubbed "Petrus Killings"). Suharto's imposition of Pancasila as sole ideology caused protests from conservative Islamic groups which considered Islamic law (sharia) to be above any human conceptions. In September 1984, a violent demonstration in the Tanjung Priok area of Jakarta by conservative Muslims led to soldiers opening fire, massacring up to 100 protesters. A retaliatory series of small bombings (notably the bombing of Borobudur Temple in January 1985) led to arrests of hundreds of conservative Islamic activists, ranging from future parliamentary leader A. M. Fatwa to radical cleric Abu Bakar Bashir (future founder of terrorist group Jemaah Islamiyah). Attacks on police by the resurgent Libyan-aided Free Aceh Movement in 1989 led to a brutal military operation ("Operasi Jaring Merah") that killed up to 12,000 people, mostly civilians, by the time ended the insurgency ended in 1992. More subtly, the Suharto government sought to better control the press by issuing a 1984 law requiring all media to possess a press operating licence (SIUPP) which could be revoked at any time by the Ministry of Information.

In the international arena, Western concern over Communism waned with the end of the Cold War, and Suharto's human-rights record came under greater international scrutiny. The November 1991 Santa Cruz Massacre in Dili, East Timor, resulted in the United States Congress passing limitations on IMET assistance to the Indonesian Military. Suharto retaliated by cancelling purchase orders for American F-16 fighter jets in 1997. When the Netherlands condemned the Santa Cruz Massacre, Suharto retaliated by expelling the Dutch from IGGI in March 1992 and renaming it the Consultative Group on Indonesia (CGI) which continued increasing aid to Indonesia. Realizing this trend, Suharto sought wider alliances under the rubric of economic development, away from over-reliance to United States support. Suharto was elected as head of the Non-Aligned Movement in 1992, while Indonesia became a founding member of APEC, in 1989, and hosted the Bogor APEC Summit in 1994.

Domestically, the growing rapaciousness of Suharto's family created discontent among the military, which lost access to power and lucrative rent-seeking opportunities. In the March 1988 MPR session, military legislators attempted to pressure Suharto by unsuccessfully seeking to block the nomination of Sudharmono, a Suharto-loyalist, as vice-president. After General Moerdani voiced his objections on the Suharto family's corruption, the president dismissed him from the position of military chief. Suharto proceeded to slowly "de-militarize" his regime; he dissolved the powerful Kopkamtib in September 1988 and ensured key military positions were held by loyalists.

In an attempt to diversify his power base away from the military, Suharto began courting support from Islamic elements. He undertook a much-publicized hajj pilgrimage in 1991, took up name of Haji Mohammad Suharto, started promoting Islamic values into society, and promoted the careers of Islamic-oriented generals (dubbed the "green generals"). To win support from the nascent Muslim business community, which resented dominance of Chinese-Indonesian conglomerates, Suharto formed the Indonesian Association of Muslim Intellectuals (ICMI) in November 1990, and appointed his protégé B. J. Habibie, Minister for Research and Technology since 1978, as its leader. During this period of Suharto's cozying with Islamists, race riots against ethnic-Chinese began to occur quite regularly, beginning with the April 1994 riot in Medan.

By the 1990s, Suharto's government came to be dominated by sycophantic civilian politicians such as Habibie, Harmoko, Ginandjar Kartasasmita, and Akbar Tanjung, who owed their position solely to Suharto. As a sign of Habibie's growing clout, when three prominent Indonesian magazines—Tempo, DeTIK, and Editor—criticised Habibie's purchase of almost the entire fleet of the disbanded East German Navy in 1993, despite most of the vessels having little value other than scrap, Suharto ordered the offending publications to be closed down on 21 June 1994 on the pretext that these critiques could "incite conflicts within the cabinet". This would lead to several of the closed publications' journalists to form the Alliance of Independent Journalists shortly thereafter; Tempo would later move to the then-largely-uncensored internet as Tempointeraktif (which still exists today as tempo.co) for the rest of the New Order, and the owner of DeTIK would launch another magazine called DeTAK.

By the 1990s, elements of the growing Indonesian middle class, created by Suharto's economic development, were becoming restless with his autocracy and his family's brazen corruption, fuelling demands for "Reformasi" (reform) of the 30-year-old New Order system. By 1996, Megawati Sukarnoputri, the daughter of Sukarno and chairwoman of the normally compliant PDI, was becoming a rallying point for this growing discontent. In response, Suharto backed a co-opted faction of the PDI led by Suryadi, which removed Megawati from the chair. On 27 July 1996, an attack by soldiers and hired thugs led by Lieutenant-General Sutiyoso on demonstrating Megawati supporters in Jakarta resulted in fatal riots and looting. This incident was followed by waves of arrests on 200 democracy activists, 23 of whom were kidnapped (some were murdered) by army squads called Tim Mawar ("Rose Team") led by Suharto's son-in-law, Major-General (currently President) Prabowo Subianto. Regardless of these incidents, as late as mid-1997, Suharto's grip on power seemed as secure as ever with the military led by his loyalists, all opposition groups suppressed, and the economy in good shape.

== End of presidency ==
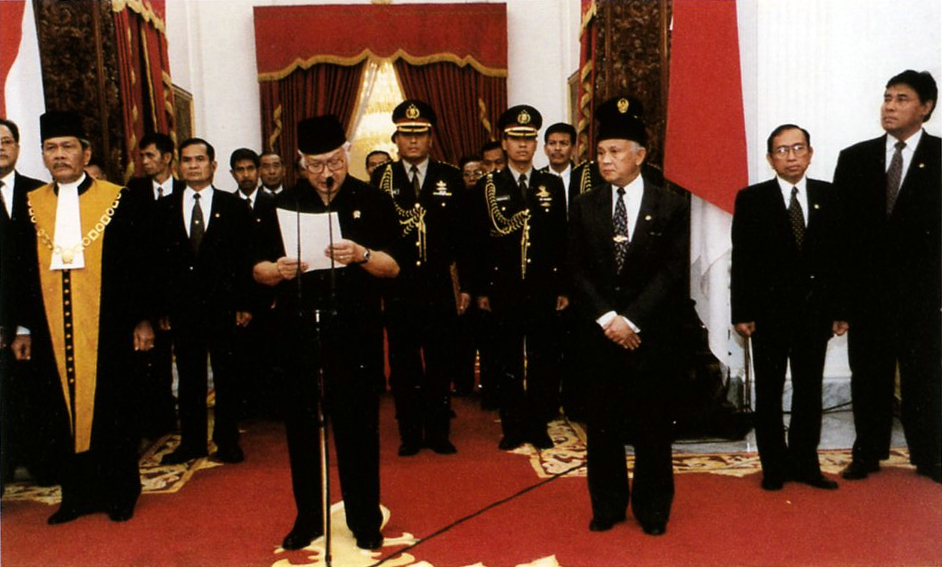
Suharto reads his address of resignation at Merdeka Palace on 21 May 1998. Suharto's VP and successor, B. J. Habibie, was on his left.

The 1997 Asian financial crisis began in July 1997, in Thailand, and spread into Indonesia as foreign speculative investors pulled out their investments, sucking U.S. dollar liquidity in Indonesia and causing severe depreciation of the Indonesian rupiah. In the private sector, many Indonesian corporations had been borrowing heavily in lower-interest U.S. dollars, while their revenues were mostly in rupiah; their debt rapidly increased as the US dollar appreciated, leaving many companies virtually bankrupt. These companies desperately sold rupiah and bought U.S. dollars, causing the rupiah's value to drop from Rp 2,600 per dollar in August 1997 to over Rp 14,800 per dollar by January 1998. Efforts by the central bank to defend its managed float regime by selling dollars had little impact and instead drained Indonesia's foreign exchange reserves, forcing the government to free-float the currency and seek liquidity aid from the IMF (International Monetary Fund).

In exchange for US$43 billion in liquidity aid, Suharto was forced to sign three letters of intent from October 1997 to April 1998 with the IMF. The letters of intent promised reforms, which included closing banks owned by Suharto's family and cronies starting in November 1997. Plans to close unhealthy banks resulted in a bank run that drained liquidity; depositors knew of the poor regulations and risky related-party credit extensions of Indonesian banks. In January 1998, the government was forced to provide emergency liquidity assistance (BLBI), issue a blanket guarantee for bank deposits, and set up the Indonesian Bank Restructuring Agency to take over management of troubled banks to prevent the collapse of the financial system. Based on IMF recommendations, the government increased interest rates to 70% in February 1998 to control spiralling inflation caused by the higher price of imports, but this action killed availability of credit to the corporate sector. Suharto's foot-dragging in undertaking reforms demanded by IMF in relation to his children's business further weakened public confidence. According to American economist Steve Hanke, invited by Suharto in February 1998 to plan a currency board system, President Bill Clinton and IMF managing director Michel Camdessus deliberately worsened the Indonesian crisis to force Suharto to resign. Hanke quoted Camdessus as saying "We created the conditions that obliged President Suharto to leave his job".

Economic meltdown was accompanied by increasing political tension. Anti-Chinese riots occurred in Situbondo (1996), Tasikmalaya (1996), Banjarmasin (1997), and Makassar (1997); while bloody ethnic clashes broke out between the Dayak and Madurese in West Kalimantan in late 1996 to early 1997 during the Sanggau Ledo riots. After violent campaign season, Golkar won the heavily rigged May 1997 MPR elections. The new MPR voted unanimously to re-elect Suharto to another five-year term in office in March 1998, upon which he proceeded to appoint his protege BJ Habibie as vice-president while stacking the cabinet with his own family and business associates (his daughter Tutut became Minister of Social Affairs). The government's decision to increase fuel prices by 70% on 4 May triggered anti-Chinese rioting in Medan. With Suharto increasingly seen as the source of the country's mounting economic and political crises, prominent political figures spoke out against his presidency (notably Muslim politician Amien Rais), and in January 1998 university students began organising nationwide demonstrations.

The crisis climaxed when Suharto was on a state visit to Egypt in May 1998. Security forces killed four student demonstrators from Jakarta's Trisakti University on 12 May 1998, which was followed by anti-Chinese rioting and looting across Jakarta and some other cities on 13–15 May that destroyed thousands of buildings and killed over 1,000 people. Various theories exist on the origins of the racial pogrom against the ethnic-Chinese. One theory suggested rivalry between military chief General Wiranto and Prabowo Subianto, while another theory suggested deliberate provocation by Suharto to divert blame for the crisis to the ethnic-Chinese and discredit the student movement.

On 16 May, tens of thousands of university students occupied the parliament building, demanding Suharto's resignation. Upon Suharto's return to Jakarta, he tried to defend his presidency by offering to resign in 2003 and to reshuffle his cabinet. These efforts failed when his political allies deserted him by refusing to join the proposed new cabinet. According to military chief Wiranto, on 18 May, Suharto issued a decree which provided authority to him to take any measures to restore security (similar to the 1966 Supersemar), however Wiranto decided not to enforce the decree to prevent conflict with the population. On 21 May 1998, Suharto announced his resignation, upon which vice-president B. J. Habibie assumed the presidency in accordance with the constitution.

== Legacy ==
Shortly following the end of his New Order, Suharto was generally condemned and vilified. The early 2000s saw a substantial growth of democratic reform, reversing many of Suharto's authoritarian policies. Culturally, Indonesians also began to embrace a variety of freedoms (kebebasan) beyond the political sphere in their personal lives.

In later years, Suharto's rule has been remembered for its deadly repression, authoritarianism, and personal corruption as well as its government stability, considerable economic growth, and accompanying increases in the standard of living, creating strongly divided perceptions of Suharto and the New Order. Upon his death in 2008, Suharto was given a burial with full military honors, signalling a renewal in public support.

Proposals to name Suharto a national hero of Indonesia have been debated following his death. A resurgence of nostalgia for Suharto's reign among some Indonesians has been linked to discontent with modern political problems and the growth of younger generations born too late to experience the New Order. The 2024 election of former New Order general Prabowo Subianto as President of Indonesia signalled a turning point in perceptions of Suharto, as Prabowo paid tribute to Suharto in his victory speech. Opinion polls showed Prabowo's victory being heavily supported by younger voters. Suharto was declared a National Hero of Indonesia in 2025.

== See also ==
- Other similar dictatorships in other countries:
  - National Reorganization Process
  - Estado Novo (Portugal)
  - Francoist Spain
  - Ba'athist Iraq
  - Ba'athist Syria
  - History of Libya under Muammar Gaddafi
  - History of the Philippines (1965–1986)
  - Martial law in Taiwan
- Anti-communism
- Criticism of Islam
- Anti-Chinese sentiment
- 1980s nostalgia
  - Pop kreatif
  - Pop melankolis
- Buruh Tani
- Fifth Brazilian Republic, a military dictatorship in Brazil with similar history
