= KAMI (Indonesia) =

Student organization in Indonesia (1965–1966)

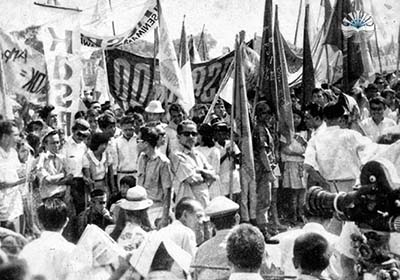
Student demonstrations during the transition to the New Order, c. 1966

The Indonesian Students' Action Union (Indonesian: Kesatuan Aksi Mahasiswa Indonesia), better known as KAMI, was a student organization founded and led by anti-communist university students in Indonesia. The group was formed to spearhead the suppression of the Indonesian Communist Party, and the left-wing in general, following an abortive coup d'état attempt in 1965.

Its core mainly consisted of Islamic, Catholic, and former Socialist Party youth groups. Supported by the Indonesian National Armed Forces, KAMI staged political demonstrations opposing President Sukarno, thereby strengthening the position of general Suharto following the coup attempt. In January 1966, it released the Three Demands of the People which called for the dissolution of the communist party, a cabinet purge, and lower prices. In much of its action, which included street marches and a campaign of pamphleteering, KAMI was supported by other similar groups, including high school students' front, the Indonesian Youth and Students Action Front, and a university graduates' front, the Indonesian Graduates' Action Front.

Shortly after the killing of two student demonstrators outside the Presidential Palace in February 1966, Sukarno officially banned KAMI, however, this was ignored by the students and their supporters and backers within the military forces and the Indonesian National Police. Ultimately, KAMI's protests led to the signing of the Supersemar which gave Suharto vast powers and led to the fall of Sukarno and the rise of the New Order. Some former student activists were later feted by general Ali Murtopo, and became key figures in policy making and Golkar, the political vehicle of the regime. In the 1970s, KAMI split between pro-government and anti-government groups. In 1973, the pro-government group became the core of the new Indonesian Youth National Committee.
