= Asas tunggal Pancasila =

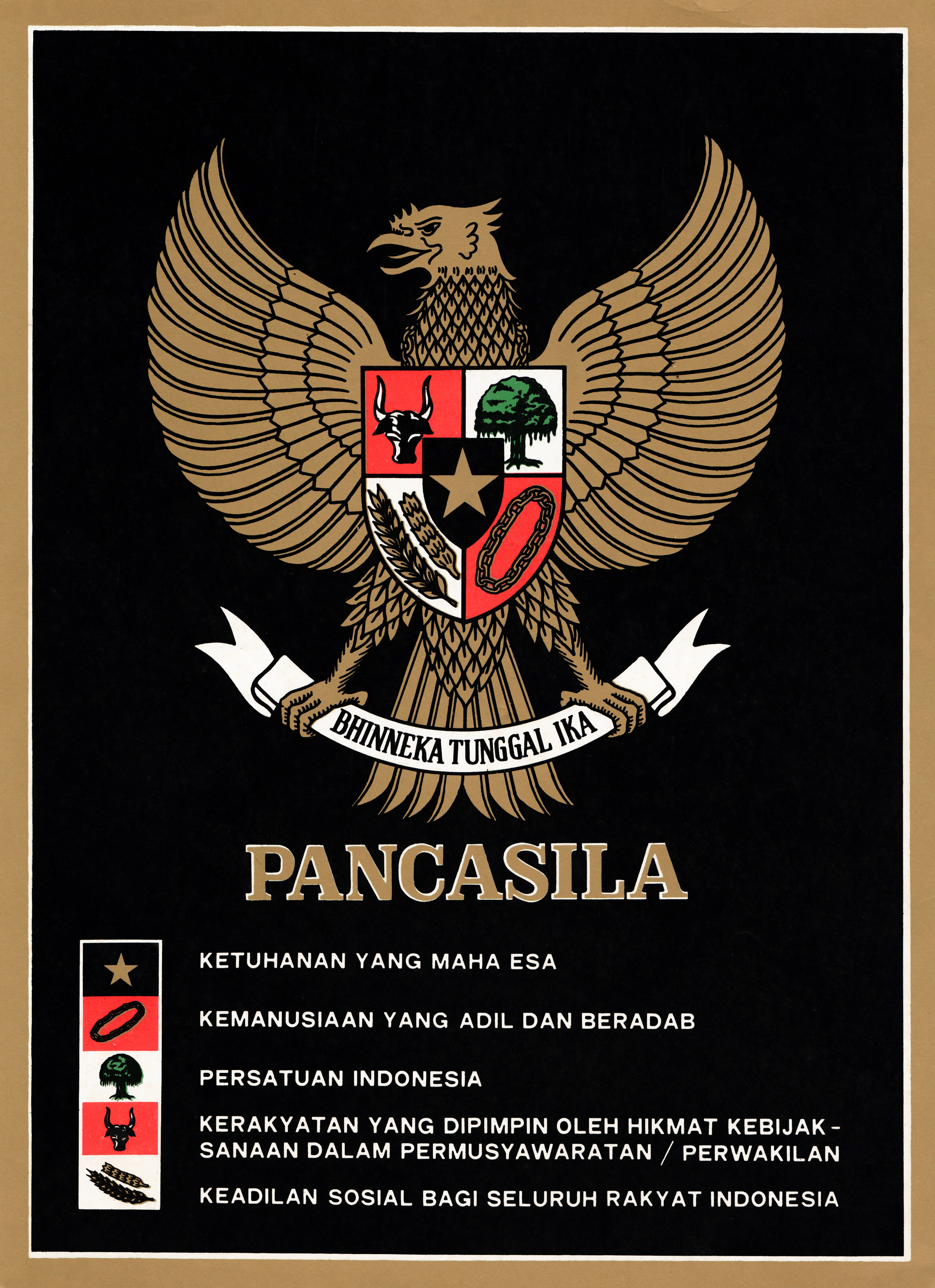
The five tenets of Pancasila.

Single principle of Pancasila (Asas tunggal Pancasila) was a policy enacted by the New Order regime under President Soeharto starting 1983 compelling political parties and public organisations to declare the national ideology of "Pancasila, as their one and only ideological basis". (Note: Original text:...yang hanya berasaskan Pancasila, sebagai satu-satunya asas.)

== History ==
In the speech delivered before the MPR RI plenary session on 16 August 1982, President Soeharto emphasised that all social and political forces must declare Pancasila as their only ideological basis.

The policy was then formulated in the MPR RI resolution No. II/MPR/1983 elucidating State Policy Guidelines (Garis-garis Besar Haluan Negara) which stated that political parties and the "Functional Groups" (official term for Golkar Party) must be the formidable political and social might that has Pancasila as their one and only ideology, to maintain and preserve the national ideology. (Note: Original text: Dalam rangka ini dan demi kelestarian dan pengamalan Pancasila, Partai Politik dan Golongan Karya harus benar-benar menjadi kekuatan sosial politik yang hanya berasaskan Pancasila, sebagai satu-satunya asas.)

Two political parties at the time (PPP and PDI) as well as the Functional Groups became the first institution with an obligation to adhere to the single principle basis, per Law No. 3 of 1983 on Political Parties. The obligation was extended to all public organisations through Law No. 8 of 1985 on Public Organisation passed on 17 June 1985.

Following the fall of the New Order in 1998, political liberalisation resulted in the abolition of the single-principle requirement for political parties and mass organisations.

== Response ==
The single-principle obligation received mixed reactions among Indonesian Muslims. While major Muslim organisations Muhammadiyah and Nahdlatul Ulama (NU) endorsed the single-principle basis, independent Muslim activists rejected the obligation.

NU argued that Pancasila consists of values that are not in opposition to Islam. Furthermore, at the NU Congress in 1984, the organisation issued a resolution affirming the final status of Pancasila, which they said was merely a philosophical value and would not replace the religion, and the 1945 Constitution. However, NU also declared their withdrawal from politics at the same congress and decided to focus on social work, which they continue to this day.

Meanwhile, Muhammadiyah also accepted the obligation by pointing out that Muhammadiyah figures, such as Ki Bagus Hadikusumo, Kahar Muzakkir, and Kasman Singodimedjo, participated in the formulation of Pancasila before the independence declaration on 17 August 1945.

In contrast, Muslim activists who aspired to establish an Islamic state in Indonesia rejected the single-principle obligation. As a result, some of them were jailed by the authorities, or escaped overseas to avoid arrest. Abu Bakar Baasyir left Indonesia and stayed in Malaysia in a self-imposed exile for 17 years after being arrested for his rejection to the policy. Ba'asyir returned to Indonesia only after the fall of Suharto in 1998.
