= Malari incident =

January 1974 riots in Jakarta, Indonesia

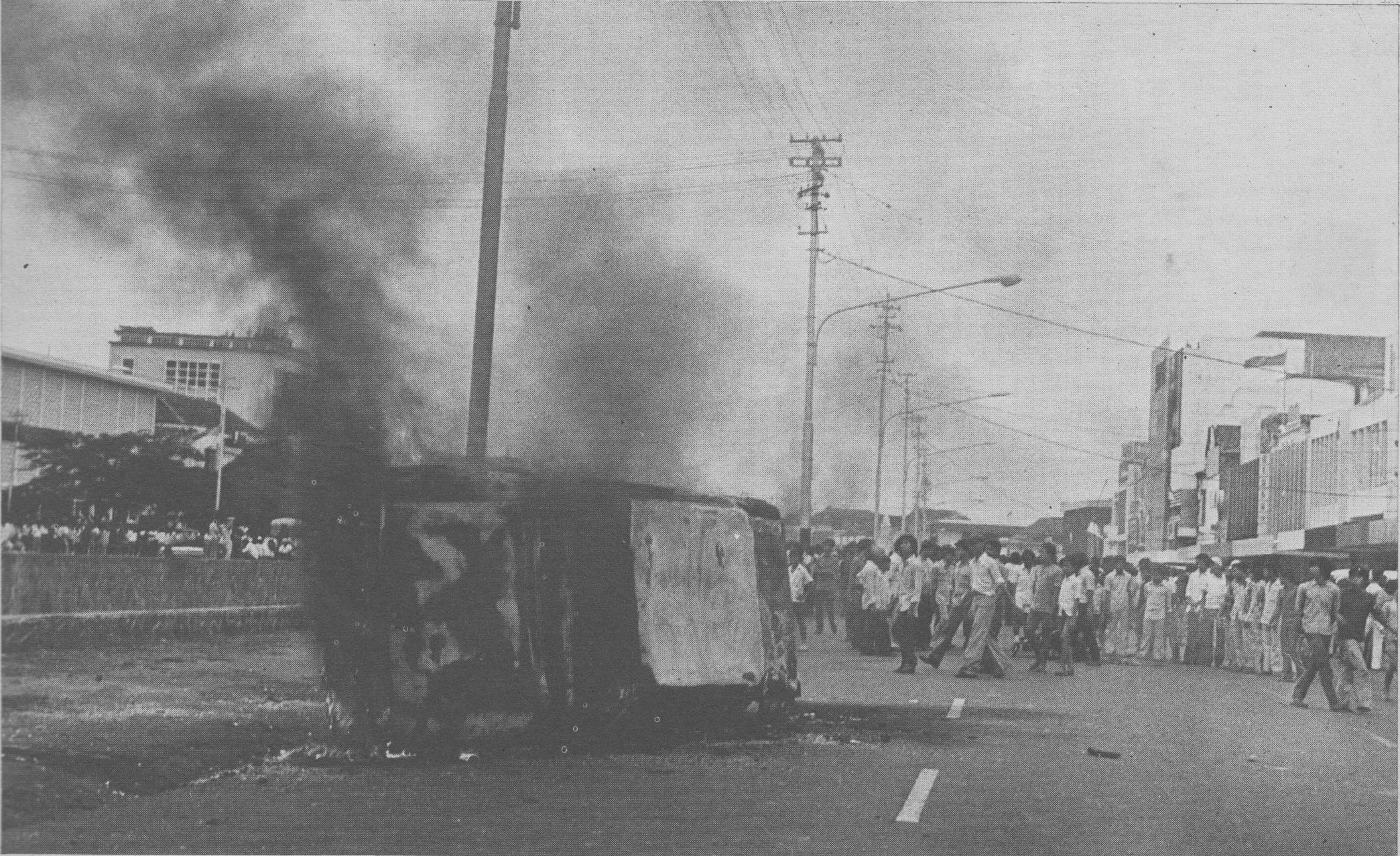
- A car on fire in Jakarta during the riots
- Date: 15–16 January 1974
- Location: Jakarta, Indonesia
- Caused by: Corruption; Competition from foreign investments; Military power struggle; anti-Chinese sentiment
- Methods: Student demonstrations, riots, pogrom
- Result: See Aftermath

Parties
Indonesian students and urban poor	New Order government: Indonesian National Armed Forces; Indonesian National Police	Chinese Indonesians

Casualties and losses
11 killed, 137 injured	None reported	Stores in Glodok damaged and destroyed

The Malari incident ([maˈlari]; Indonesian: Peristiwa Malari, short for Malapetaka Lima Belas Januari, lit. 'Fifteenth of January Disaster') was a student demonstration and riot that happened on 15 and 16 January 1974 in Jakarta, Indonesia. In reaction to a state visit by the Japanese Prime Minister, Kakuei Tanaka, students held a demonstration protesting corruption, high prices, and inequality in foreign investments. After provocation by suspected agents provocateurs, the demonstrations became riots, which eventually turned into a pogrom against Chinese Indonesians. By the end of the incident, eleven protesters had been killed and hundreds of cars and buildings destroyed.

The riots caused numerous changes. Suharto's New Order government enacted a series of economic reforms meant to improve Native Indonesian representation in partnerships with foreign investors, General Sumitro (then Deputy Chief of the Armed Forces), was forced to retire, and numerous repressive measures were enforced by the government.

== Background ==
At the beginning of Suharto's New Order in 1966 the policies of economic development were popularly supported. However, dissent soon surfaced. The formerly-powerful Indonesian Nationalist and Masyumi political parties were pressured to replace their old leadership. Civilian politicians began to be considered untrustworthy, and all branches of the government (except the executive branch) steadily diminished in importance. Suharto's Golkar party won the 1971 Indonesian legislative election by forcing government employees to vote for them and promising funds to supportive constituencies.

Disillusionment with the government continued to rise. The elimination of corruption, once hoped to be a priority of the New Order, was not worked towards; corruption instead became more institutionalized. Critics disagreed with the "financial generals", army staff who used their relationships with the ethnic Chinese Indonesians to become rich. One of them, Sujono Humardhani, was identified as the most prolific in convincing Japanese businesses to invest in Indonesia. When they did, they often took full ownership of the investments and partnered with Chinese Indonesians or senior military officers instead of with native Indonesians. The success of the 1973 Thai student demonstrations convinced Indonesian students that they could change policy.

== Riots ==
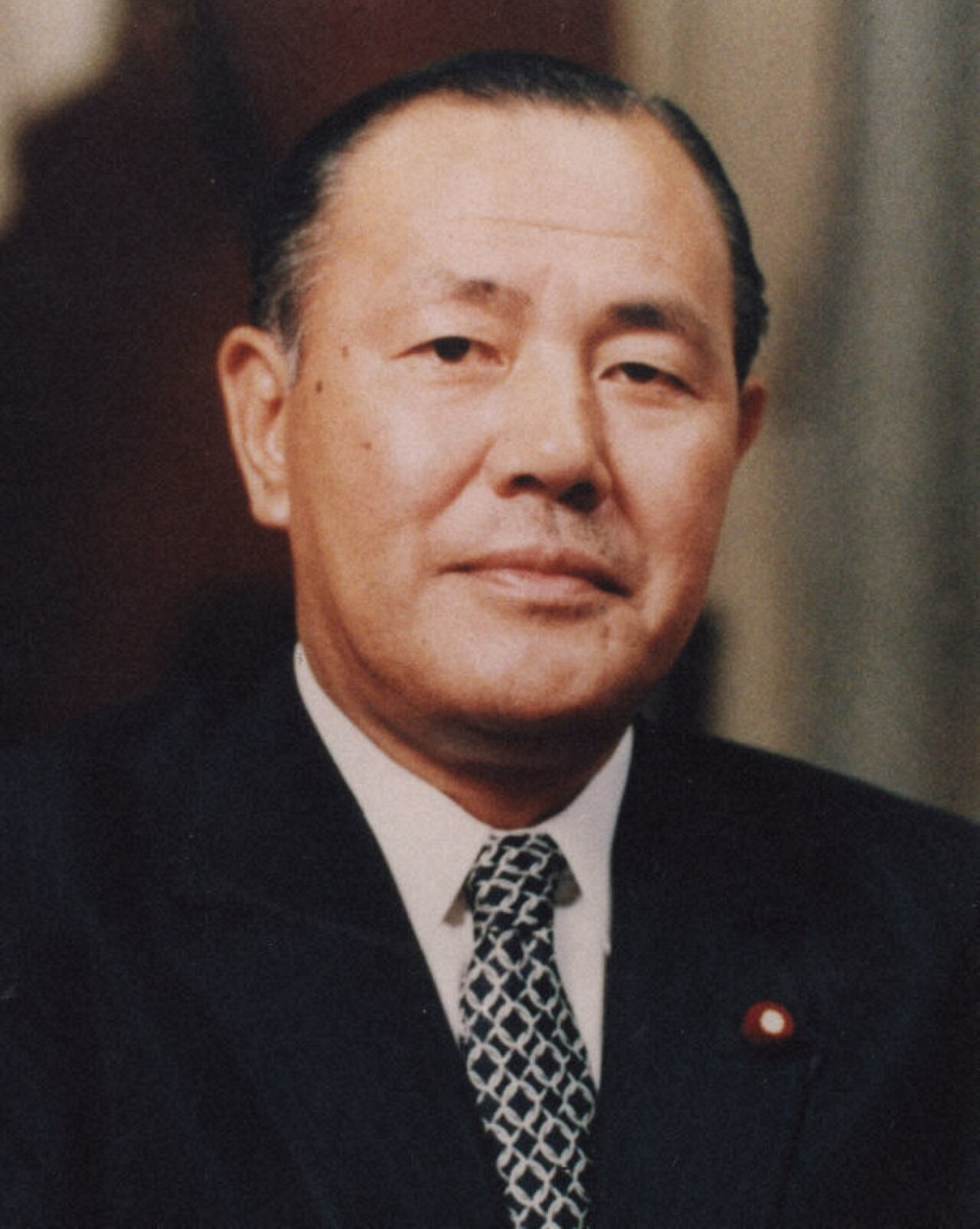
The Prime Minister of Japan, Kakuei Tanaka, whose visit started the riots

On 14 January 1974, Japanese Prime Minister Kakuei Tanaka arrived for a state visit. Enraged by Japan's competitive pressures on local businesses, students burned effigies of Tanaka and Humardhani outside of Ali Murtopo's office. They faced no resistance from the Indonesian military.

The next morning, thousands of students demonstrated in the streets of Jakarta, calling for lower prices, an end to corruption, and the disbanding of Aspri, Suharto's clique of personal assistants. Although the demonstrations began peacefully, by the afternoon suspected Special Forces' agents provocateurs had turned it into a full riot. Hundreds of cars were burned, mainly of Japanese make. More stores were looted, including "the most visible symbol of Japanese presence in Indonesia", an Astra dealership selling Toyota-brand cars on Sudirman Street.

By the evening, the riot had been diverted into an anti-Chinese Indonesian pogrom. Stores in Glodok, owned by ethnic Chinese, were looted, vandalized, destroyed, and arsoned; the largest being the Senen shopping complex. The security forces did little to stop the looting, and it was reported that General Sumitro was seen speaking with the demonstrators in a friendly manner. However, some troops executed orders to shoot looters on sight.

Later that evening, Hariman Siregar, president of the Student Body of the University of Indonesia, called for an end to the riots via TVRI, saying "this wasn't our intent". It was later reported that Siregar had made the plea under duress.

The riots were brought to an end the next day, when KKO, RPKAD, and Kostrad forces fired upon the rioters. By then, Prime Minister Tanaka had already left Indonesia due to the riots. During the three days of civil conflict 11 people were killed, 17 critically injured, 120 non-critically injured and roughly 770 arrested. Almost 1,000 motor vehicles were damaged and 144 buildings destroyed or burned.

== Aftermath ==
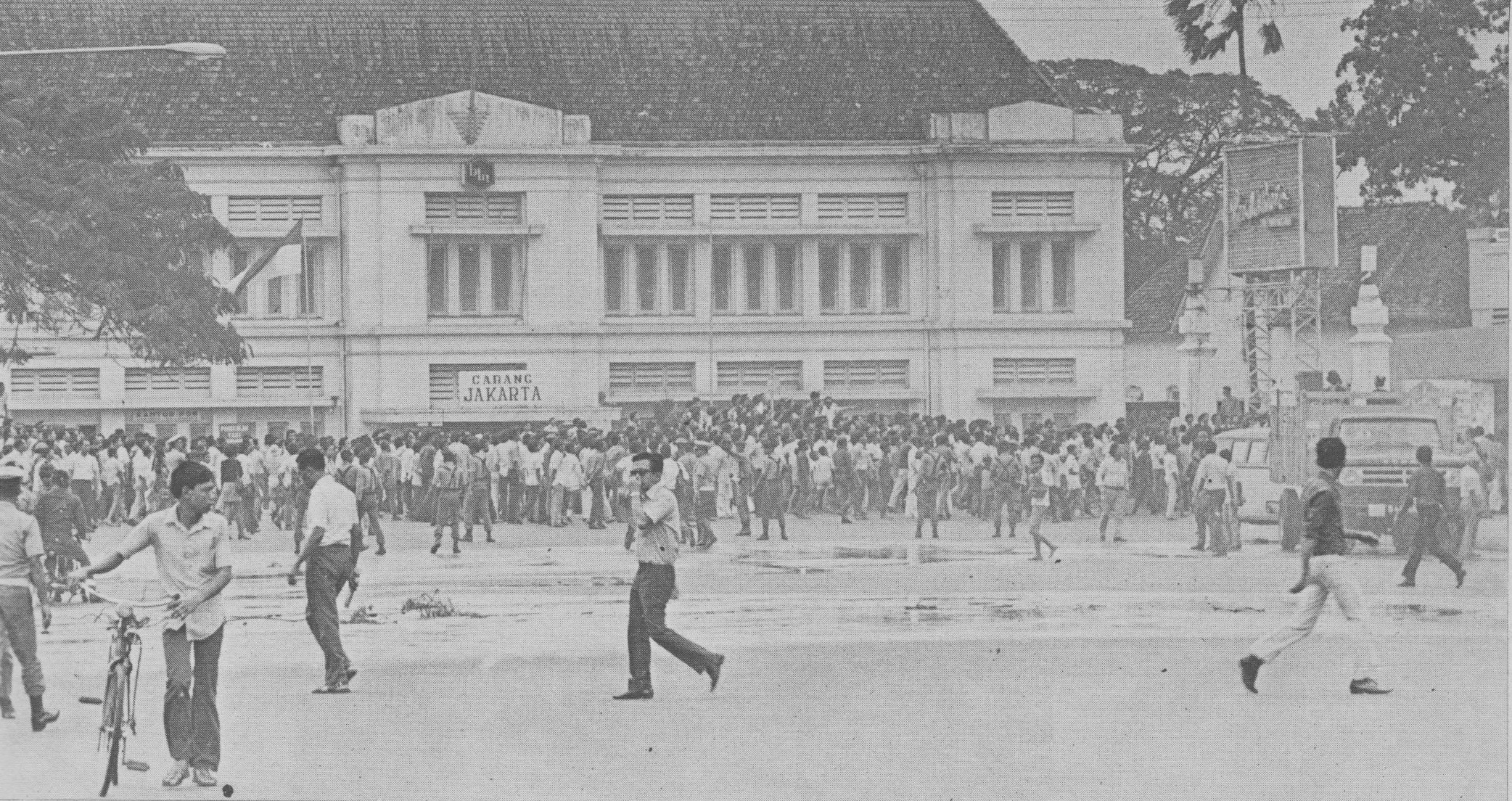
Crowds on the streets during the 15 January 1974 "Malari" riots

General Sumitro, the Deputy Chief of the Armed Forces, was blamed for inciting the rioters, and forced to resign. His supporters were removed from command positions, being made ambassadors or receiving staff jobs. This move was supported by the "Ramadi Document" presented to President Suharto by General Ali Murtopo, a rival of Sumitro's. It hinted that a general with the initial S would attempt a coup d'état between April and June 1974.

After the Malari incident, the New Order became more repressive and quicker to act when citizens expressed dissent, including through demonstrations and the media, abandoning the fragile "partnership" they once had. Twelve newspapers and magazines had their printing and publishing permits revoked, including Indonesia Raya. Journalists, such as Mochtar Lubis, were detained without trial. Offending journalists, such as Atmakusumah, began to be blacklisted, losing nearly all job opportunities.

Within a week of the Malari incident, the New Order presented a package of regulations meant to promote the economic interests of Native Indonesians. The plan, mandating partnerships between foreign investors and Native Indonesians as well as the use of the planned Indonesia Stock Exchange, and requiring potential investors submit a plan for future majority Native Indonesian ownership, was well received by the public and silenced critics. In practice, however, this was not strictly enforced.

The Aspri were officially disbanded. However, former Aspri Ali Murtopo was later promoted to head of the Indonesian State Intelligence Agency and all of them stayed on as trusted advisers.

== Reactions ==
The New Order government was "shocked to its very roots" by its inability to handle the riots during Tanaka's visit. Jeffrey Winters notes that the greatest fear of the Indonesian politicians at the time was an uprising of the millions of urban and rural poor.
