= Soedjono Hoemardani =

Indonesian military officer

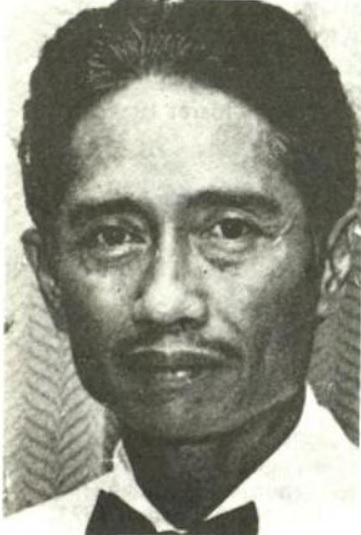
- Soedjono, c.1970
- Born: 7 September 1918; Surakarta, Dutch East Indies
- Died: 12 March 1986 (aged 67) Tokyo, Japan
- Allegiance: Indonesia
- Rank: Major general

Major General Soedjono Hoemardani (7 September 1918 – 12 March 1986) was an Indonesian military officer.

Soedjono originated from Surakarta and after an early career in his father's trading business he joined the fledgling Indonesian National Armed Forces in 1945, at the start of the Indonesian National Revolution, as a financial officer in Kodam IV/Diponegoro. He built up a relationship with Suharto during his time under him, and as Suharto took power as President in 1966, he was appointed as a personal assistant (Aspri). In this capacity, Soedjono was a major player in the economic relations between Indonesia and Japan. His actions in this role generated significant controversy, which culminated in 1974 when he was a target of demonstrators during the Malari incident. After the incident, he toned down his relations with Japan publicly, though he maintained his Japanese connections until his death in 1986.

== Early life ==
Soedjono was born in Surakarta on 7 September 1918 (Note: Often erroneously reported as 23 December 1919 due to the use of the Javanese calendar) as the son of Raden Hoemardani, a local entrepreneur in Surakarta. He studied in Surakarta for some time and then went to a trading school in Semarang, before returning to Surakarta to work on his father's business in 1937, and he also became the treasurer of a nationalist youth organisation Indonesia Muda (Young Indonesia).

== Career ==
After the Japanese took power in Indonesia, Soedjono joined the Japanese reserve police force (Keibōdan) and became a deputy commander. During the Indonesian National Revolution, he started off in 1945 as a second lieutenant in the 4th Division (today Kodam IV/Diponegoro), and became a treasurer for a regiment within it. He was later promoted to first lieutenant in 1947 and was assigned as the division's financial officer. After the war, his rank was elevated to captain in 1950, major in 1957, and lieutenant colonel in 1961. During this period, Soeharto was the commander of the Diponegoro division, and Soedjono was his financial officer. Soedjono also undertook a 10-month course in the United States Army Financial Management School at Fort Benjamin Harrison, completing it in 1964.

In mid-1966, several months following Suharto's takeover of the presidency (through the Supersemar), Soedjono was appointed as one of six military officers in Suharto's personal staff, and as one of three junior officers (under the coordination of Alamsyah Ratu Perwiranegara). At the time, he held the rank of colonel. By September that year, he was dispatched with Adam Malik's delegation to the Netherlands, the US, and Japan, and the delegation announced Indonesia's reapplication to the United Nations while it was in New York. In a 1969 interview, Soedjono remarked that Suharto's only order for the delegation for the United Nations was to "enter". When the delegation then went to Japan, Soedjono met with influential Japanese figures lobbying for relations with Indonesia, and established himself as the intermediary between Suharto's government and the lobby. The following year, industrialist Yutaka Kubota visited him to lobby for the resumption of the development of an aluminum plant at Asahan.

Due to extensive powers they held, Suharto's personal staff was nicknamed as the "shadow government" around 1968. Suharto disbanded his personal staff due to suspicions of business interests in 1968, but the three army officers (including Soedjono) were immediately reappointed as "personal assistants" (Aspri), and effectively nothing changed for them. With his new title, Soedjono continued engaging with Japanese investors (becoming a subject of student demonstrations in 1972 due to his involvement in the matter), lobbying for loans and investments almost exclusively outside formal diplomatic methods. He defended multiple times during interviews his role in allowing significant foreign capital control over firms operating in Indonesia, though he did help establish significant ties between some local entrepreneurs and Japanese investors. Additionally, a recommendation from Soedjono was considered essential for local entrepreneurs seeking to establish ties with Japanese companies.

Soedjono was promoted to the rank of major general in 1969. In 1971, Soedjono, alongside Ali Murtopo, backed the founding of the Centre for Strategic and International Studies. He was further appointed as an armed forces representative to the People's Consultative Assembly in 1971.

=== Malari incident ===
Soedjono and Ali Murtopo were known in the early 1970s to be in opposing factions within the military leadership against Sumitro. Soedjono's well-known position as the conduit for Japanese investors became target of student protesters, who on 15 January 1974 rioted in what became known as the Malari incident. Effigies of Soedjono and Japanese PM Kakuei Tanaka (who was visiting) were burned by the protesters; eventually, Aspri was disbanded, and Soedjono was reassigned as an inspector general of national development in July 1974.

After the incident, Soedjono's publicly visible relationship with Japanese investors diminished, though he maintained ties with his Japanese network throughout the 1970s and 1980s.

=== Spiritual advisor ===
There was a popular belief that Suharto had relied on Soedjono for spiritual advice (Alamsyah had once referred to Soedjono, in criticism, as a "dukun"). Suharto himself denied this in his autobiography, claiming that Soedjono had more often approached him for spiritual affairs.

== Death ==
Soedjono died on 12 March 1986 in Tokyo, Japan, due to internal bleeding. Before his body was transported back to Indonesia, he was visited by multiple of his Japanese colleagues (many from the Ministry of Foreign Affairs), and his burial procession was accompanied by the Japanese Ambassador to Indonesia at the time. He was buried outside Surakarta.

== Bibliography ==
- Soedjono Hoemardani pendiri CSIS, 1918-1986 (in Indonesian). Centre for Strategic and International Studies. 1987.
- Malley, Michael (1989). "Soedjono Hoemardani and Indonesian-Japanese Relations 1966-1974". Indonesia (48): 47–64. doi:10.2307/3351266. hdl:1813/53919. ISSN 0019-7289. JSTOR 3351266.
