= Centre for Strategic and International Studies =

Indonesian public policy think tank

- Abbreviation: CSIS
- Formation: 1971
- Type: Public policy think tank
- Headquarters: Jl. Tanah Abang III/23-27, Jakarta 10160
- Location: Indonesia
- Executive Director: Philips J. Vermonte
- Website: csis.or.id

The Centre for Strategic and International Studies (CSIS) is a non-profit organization based in Indonesia which has served as a think tank on social, international, political and economical issues. CSIS was founded on Sept 1, 1971 by a group of Indonesian colleagues who hoped to promote public policy-oriented discussions in Indonesia. Founders of the organization included Harry Tjan Silalahi, Jusuf Wanandi, Hadi Soesastro, and Clara Joewono. It also had strong support from key figures close to the government at the time including generals Ali Moertopo, Soedjono Hoemardani, and Benny Moerdani. It was founded to give advice, ideas and support to government and other stakeholders such as parliament, political parties, businesses and NGOs and to reach out to the regional and international communities and to develop awareness of Indonesian policies and its state of development, while giving feedback to the Indonesian government on domestic and international developments.

It is located in Jl. Tanah Abang III/23-27, Jakarta close to the National Museum of Indonesia.

== History ==
CSIS was conceived in the 1960s as a strategic and security studies think-tank by brothers Jusuf and Sofjan Wanandi. It was funded in part by the Chinese Indonesian business community and had the support of the Indonesian administration, including generals Ali Moertopo and Soedjono Hoemardani as well as two of the personal assistants of president Suharto. They turned down an offer to become a presidential think tank in order to stay independent and credible.

In its early years, CSIS was not trusted by some parts of the Muslim community in Indonesia because it was perceived to be a Catholic and Chinese-supported institution.

In 1988, President Suharto distanced CSIS from his administration as a memo from Jusuf Wanandi which advised the preparation of a new generation of leadership for Indonesia after 20 years of his presidential rule was seen as a call for him to step down. Suharto instructed his ministers to sever ties with CSIS. However, some politicians still maintained links with CSIS.

== Activities ==
It is actively involved in international collaboration, including hosting the Indonesian National Committee for Pacific Economic Cooperation (INCPEC) for the Pacific Economic Cooperation Council (PECC). CSIS is also a founding institute of the Council for Asia Europe Cooperation (CAEC).

CSIS published widely in both English and Indonesian, including books and monographs of research, The Indonesian Quarterly (established in 1974), Analisis CSIS (established in 1971). It cooperates with the Indonesia project of the Australian National University to print and distribute the Bulletin of Indonesian Economic Studies (BIES).

The institute hosts a topic-based library open to the public with around 50,000 book titles, and many academic journals, as well as a newspaper clipping service from national and regional newspapers.

CSIS is one of the founders and a long-standing member committee of the Council for Security Cooperation in the Asia Pacific (CSCAP).

Dr Rizal Sukma, former Executive Director of CSIS and current (2018) Indonesian ambassador to the United Kingdom, was instrumental in his advisory capacity to then foreign minister Hassan Wirajuda on the concept of the ASEAN political and security community during Indonesia’s ASEAN chairmanship in 2003.
