= Jusuf Wanandi =

Indonesian politician

- Born: Liem Bian Kie; 15 November 1937; Sawahlunto, Dutch East Indies

Chinese name
- Traditional Chinese: 林綿基
- Simplified Chinese: 林綿基
- Hanyu Pinyin: Lín Mián Jī
- Hokkien POJ: Lîm Mî Ki

Jusuf Wanandi, born Lim Bian Kie (Chinese: 林綿基; Pe̍h-ōe-jī: Lîm Mî Ki) is a Chinese-Indonesian politician and educator. Born in Sawahlunto, West Sumatra, on 15 November 1937, he is an older brother of tycoon Sofjan Wanandi.

== Education ==
After completing junior high school in Padang, Wanandi moved to Jakarta to enroll in the Jesuit Kanisius High School. He later entered the Faculty of Law of the University of Indonesia and graduated in 1960. Wanandi also took part in a Catholic leadership course taught by father Joop Beek.

After finishing his high school studies, Wanandi taught at his own alma mater, Kanisius High School. He later became an assistant lecturer at the University of Indonesia, before becoming increasingly involved in politics in the 1960s.

== Career ==
Wanandi was a prominent student activist during the 1965–66 political turmoil in Indonesia when president Sukarno was ousted by Suharto. In 1971, Wanandi was one of the founders of the Centre for Strategic and International Studies (CSIS) think tank in Jakarta and remains active in CSIS. During the 1970s and 1980s, he was an adviser to president Suharto on political and international affairs. He was a member of Suharto's political vehicle, Golongan Karya (Golkar Party), where he served as vice secretary general. By the end of the 1980s, Suharto had become less interested in receiving advice from Wanandi and other CSIS members.

Beginning in 1984, for a number of years he held a governor position at the East West Centre in Hawaii.

Wanandi is a co-owner, board member and occasional contributor to The Jakarta Post newspaper.

He was elected co-chair of the Pacific Economic Cooperation Council (PECC) in 2008.

== See also ==
- List of Chinese Indonesians
- Chinese Indonesian
