= Aspri =

Group of advisors to Indonesian President Suharto

Asisten Pribadi (English: Personal assistants), better known by the acronym Aspri, were a team of advisors to Indonesian President Suharto from 1968 until 1974. The group was disbanded in the wake of the Malari incident in January 1974, though all members of the group would remain active as advisors to Suharto, including General Ali Murtopo who was appointed Minister of Information in the Third Development Cabinet in 1978.

== History ==
Aspri was the successor team to the previous group of personal staff (Staf Pribadi, or Spri) that Suharto had appointed a few years before. The small group of Spri had been formed by Suharto in August 1966 after he had received the Supersemar letter of authority from Sukarno. He appointed the Spri to help him establish the New Order regime in Indonesia. The original team of Spri included six army officers and twelve civilians. In 1968, after Suharto had been appointed President in his own right, he disbanded the Spri and formed Aspri instead, limiting its membership to a small group of army officers. Although their position did not entail formal power, some members of Aspri, notably Ali Murtopo and Sujono Humardhani, became influential figures in their own right.

However over time the Aspri group of advisers became unpopular because the group was seen to be exercising too much influence. Critics of the regime took the opportunity to press for the group to be disbanded in the last months of 1973 and January 1974. Suharto responded to the criticisms by disbanding the Aspri team after the Malari Incident in January 1974. Even so, the individuals who had been members of the team remained close to Suharto and influential within government into the 1980s.

== Members ==
The members of Aspri were:

- Aspri for Special Affairs: Maj. Gen. Ali Murtopo
- Aspri for Economics: Maj. Gen. Sujono Humardhani
- Aspri for Finance: Lt. Gen. Suryo Wiryohadiputro
- Aspri for Presidential Security: Maj. Gen. Cokropranolo

== See also ==
- Military of Indonesia
