= Ali Murtopo =

Indonesian politician and general (1924–1984)

Lieutenant General (Ret.) Ali Murtopo
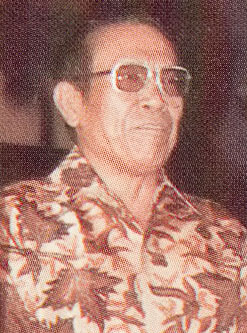

Minister of Information
- In office 29 March 1978 – 19 March 1983
- President: Suharto
- Preceded by: Mashuri Saleh
- Succeeded by: Harmoko

Personal details
- Born: 23 September 1924 Cepu, Blora, Dutch East Indies
- Died: 15 May 1984 (aged 59) Jakarta, Indonesia
- Spouse: Wastoeti (m. 1956)
- Children: Harris Ali Moerfi; Lucky Ali Moerfiqin

Military service
- Allegiance: Dutch East Indies; Indonesia
- Branch/service: NEFIS; Indonesian Army
- Years of service: 1945–1978
- Rank: Lieutenant General
- Unit: Infantry

Ali Murtopo (23 September 1924 – 15 May 1984) was a prominent Indonesian general and political figure during the first half of General Suharto's New Order regime.

== Early life ==
Ali Murtopo was born on 23 September 1924 in Kebumen, Central Java and received his education in Central Java and West Java. He met his wife, Wastoeti, in Yogyakarta and they were married in May 1956.

== Military career ==
Born in Blora 23 September 1924, Ali Murtopo spent his education in Meer Uitgebreid Lager Onderwijs. As a teenager, Ali joined Hizbullah but would eventually join the Indonesian military. During the Indonesian National Revolution, Ali became a staff member in a brigade led by Ahmad Yani.

However, somewhat different versions of the past of Ali came from general Sumitro, and Wadyono, 17th Regiment of TKR army commander. (Note: Wadyono is commander of Tentara Keamanan Rakyat, main body of Indonesian revolutionary army.) Both of them testified that Ali Murtopo originally is a member of NEFIS agent who worked for Dutch:

- Sumitro version told that his close friend, Kasman Singodimedjo, who at that time fighting for Indonesian revolutionary, has testified that Ali were captured by Hizbullah (Indonesia) forces in Tegal. (Note: the Author has quoted the exceprt of this accident of the capture of Ali from book of Pangkopkamtib Jenderal Soemitro dan Peristiwa 15 Januari '74 : sebagaimana dituturkan kepada Heru Cahyono)
- Meanwhile, Wadyono told slightly different version that Ali were caught by his underlings in Wiradesa, Pekalongan District. Wadyono testifies that Ali escaped execution because he struct deal with his captor to work for Indonesian revolutionary as double agent.

In 1952, Ali became a company Commander in Ahmad Yani's Banteng Raiders, an elite group of soldiers formed to chase away the remnants of the Darul Islam movement. In 1956, whilst still in command of his Banteng Raider unit, Ali was involved in the lobbying to decide who should become the Commander of the 4th Military Territory (TT IV) Diponegoro, which supervised the security of the Provinces of Central Java and Yogyakarta. Although the Army Headquarters in Jakarta had decided on a candidate, those within TT IV Diponegoro, led by Yoga Sugama wanted the then Lieutenant Colonel Suharto to become the next TT IV Commander. Yoga met various officers within TT IV Diponegoro to look for support and Ali for his part, gave his support to Suharto. After getting enough support, Yoga went to Jakarta to inform the Army Headquarters of who the soldiers at TT IV Diponegoro wanted as their Commander. The Army Headquarters relented and Suharto was appointed Commander.

As a reward, Ali was appointed as Territorial Assistant to Suharto with Yoga occupying the position of intelligence assistant. Together with Sujono Humardhani, who was in charge of finance, the four would go up the ranks together. In 1959, Ali took part in the fighting against the Revolutionary Government of the Republic of Indonesia (PRRI), a rebel group from Sumatra. He was sent to fight in Sumatra as a Regimental Chief of Staff with Yoga as the Regiment Commander.

== Suharto's Dismissal ==
1959 was also the year in which Suharto was dismissed from his position as TT IV Commander as a result of involvement in illegal activities. Ali stayed on with TT IV which was now renamed Kodam VII/Diponegoro (currently Kodam IV/Diponegoro) until early 1961, when he rejoined Suharto. Suharto was now the Operations Assistant to the Army Chief of Staff, General A H Nasution and was now the Commander of the Army General Reserve (Caduad), a strategic force unit which would be on standby, ready to be called into battle at any time. Ali received the position of Assistant to the Caduad Chief of Staff. In 1963, Caduad would change its name to the Army Strategic Command Kostrad.

== Confrontation ==
During the Indonesia–Malaysia confrontation that had begun in 1963, Kostrad had been expected to play a vital role by virtue of Suharto being appointed Deputy Commander of the Alert Theater Command (Kolaga), a battle command headed by Air Marshal Omar Dhani and which had been formed for the purpose of fighting a war against Malaysia. The Army however was not enthusiastic about Confrontation and dragged its feet. Ali, now the Intelligence Assistant at Kostrad would become involved with this process. Using his Special Operations (Opsus) unit, Ali sent out messages to the Malaysian Government to inform them about the Army's stance on Confrontation and to ask the Malaysian Government to consider a peaceful solution to Confrontation.

== Transition to New Order ==
On the morning of 1 October 1965, Ali found himself hastily summoned to Kostrad headquarters to respond to a rapidly developing incident. The morning had seen six generals kidnapped and unidentified troops occupying the Presidential Palace, the National Monument, and the Radio Republik Indonesia building. Suharto arrived at the scene just in time to hear an announcement by a group calling themselves the 30 September Movement saying that they had just stopped a coup attempt by a Council of Generals. With army commander Ahmad Yani nowhere to be found, Suharto assumed leadership of the Army.

The first thing to be done was to identify the unidentified troops occupying strategic locations in Jakarta. It was soon found out that the troops were Battalions 454 and 530 from Central and East Java. After getting this information, Suharto sent Ali on a negotiation mission to Battalion 454. Ali conveyed Suharto's warning that the Battalion had until 6 pm to surrender but ultimately failed to convince them. Battalion 454 chose instead to retreat to Halim Airbase, the command post of the 30 September Movement. Nevertheless, the victory that day belonged to Suharto who regained control of Jakarta by the morning of 2 October 1965.

When Suharto was appointed Commander of the Army, Ali became part of Suharto's personal staff and together with Yoga who looked after intelligence matters. Ali was by Suharto's side as the latter began his rise to power. In early 1966, as the Army encouraged student protesters to demonstrate against President Sukarno, Ali played his part by assigning Kostrad troops to protect the protesters from troops loyal to the President. The political unrest finally ended on 11 March 1966 when Sukarno handed over executive authority to Suharto through Supersemar.

With Suharto holding considerable political power, there was now an official effort to end Confrontation. Ali laid the groundwork for the rapprochement before official diplomacy was undertaken by Minister of Foreign Affairs Adam Malik.

== New Order ==
=== First years ===
Ali's power would increase after Suharto was elected Acting President and full President by the Provisional People's Consultative Assembly (MPRS) in 1967 and 1968 respectively. In 1967, Ali became the Deputy Head of the National Intelligence Coordinating Agency (Bakin) but his real power was derived from his positions as a member of the President's team of Personal Assistants (asisten pribadi or Aspri) and as the Head of Opsus. As an Aspri, Ali's power came from the fact that he had Suharto's ear and that together with other Aspri members such as Sujono, he was one of a group of few people who Suharto consulted regularly for advice. As the Head of Opsus, Ali was the head of an extraconstitutional agency which had broad and undefined powers. In this capacity, he was only answerable to Suharto himself.

=== Sarwo Edhie Wibowo ===
In 1969, together with Sarwo Edhie Wibowo, Ali was assigned by Suharto to make sure that the people of Papua (then known as West Irian) voted for integration with Indonesia in the Act of Free Choice. In ensuring this, Ali's focus was the Act of Free Choice Consultative Council (Dewan Musyawarah Pepera), a group of 1,025 Papuans who will vote on behalf of the whole West Irian population.

Ali also took measures to further strengthen the position of the New Order regime. In 1970, Ali actively interfered in the internal affairs of the Indonesian National Party (PNI) and the Indonesian Muslim Party (Parmusi). In both cases, Ali interfered to make sure that the leadership of both parties were not hostile towards Suharto's government. In 1971, Ali also popularized the concept of the "floating mass" which sought to depoliticize Indonesian society and cut down on the influence of political parties.

Perhaps more importantly, Ali set down the mechanisms by which Suharto would be able to be re-elected for the Presidency. After deciding on the Joint Secretariat of the Functional Groups (Sekber Golkar) as his political party, Suharto ordered Ali to begin preparing Sekber Golkar for the 1971 Legislative Election. Ali did so by laying down a party platform based on development, stability, order, and unity to attract voters. To further ensure the prospects of victory, Ali made sure that the Government threw its support behind Golkar and mobilized the populace to vote for Golkar. This he did by allocating quotas of the amount of vote to be won for Government officials at lower levels of Government. Ali's preparation paid off and on 5 July 1971, Golkar won the Legislative Elections with 62.5% of the votes. This was followed by Suharto's re-election to the Presidency by the People's Consultative Assembly (MPR) in 1973.

Although he held a lot of power and influence, Ali was by no means a popular figure. Among the critics of the regime, Ali, like his Aspri colleagues were disliked for the amount of power that they held despite the lack of clarity given to their roles. Ali was also unpopular amongst some colleagues for using his access to Suharto to erode their influence. At one point, he used this access to recommend an ally for the position of Provincial Governor; whereas if the proper procedures were adhered to, it would be up to the Minister of Home Affairs to recommend the appointment of a Governor to the President.

=== Centre for Strategic and International Studies ===
In the early 1970s Ali, along with his colleague Soedjono Hoemardani, became associated with the new think tank, the Centre for Strategic and International Studies (CSIS) which was established in Jakarta in 1971. As part of his activities with CSIS, Ali prepared a book, Some Basic Thoughts on the Acceleration and Modernization of 25 Years’ Development, setting out his broad ideas on the future of Indonesia. He emphasised the importance of security, stability, and the need to "accelerate the modernization of the nation." He spoke of the goal of tripling national income over a 25-year period, and of the aim of sustaining an 8% annual growth rate.

=== Rivalry with General Sumitro ===
As Suharto began his second term as President, he did not have the amount of popularity that he had when he took the office from Sukarno. As 1973 wore on, there was increasing displeasure, especially within universities with corruption, the amount of foreign investment in the Indonesian economy, and the power held by Aspri. At the same time, a rivalry was developing within the political elite. On one side was Ali, who advocated the military's continuing involvement with politics. On the other side was General Sumitro, the Commander of the Restoration of Security and Order Operation Command (Kopkamtib), Indonesia's secret police agency. Sumitro wanted the military to cut down its involvement in politics and to reduce its role to a purely professional one. Towards the end of 1973, Sumitro began to distance himself from the Government. He did not take action against the criticism and dissent directed at the regime although it was well within his brief to do so. In fact, Sumitro began holding talks in university campuses and calling for a new leadership. As 1973 drew to a close, Suharto tried to mediate the two rivals through a series of meetings but he did not succeed.

=== Kakuei Tanaka's visit ===
On 14 January 1974, Japanese Prime Minister Kakuei Tanaka arrived in Jakarta for a visit. Tanaka's visit provided the ideal opportunity for those who were critical of the amount of foreign investment in Indonesia to protest and express their displeasure. On 15 and 16 January however, the protests turned violent and riots broke out in Jakarta leaving 11 dead, 300 injured, and 775 arrested. On first glance, it would seem as if the blame was Sumitro's. Based on the riots that ensued, it looked as if he had made the wrong decision by allowing the demonstrators to protest. But there is a theory that Ali had sent his agents into the crowd to incite the violence so that Sumitro could be discredited

=== Sumitro's dismissal and Aspri dissolution ===
After Tanaka left, Suharto took action against Sumitro. Sumitro resigned the Commandership of Kopkamtib and followed it up with his resignation from the Deputy Commandership of ABRI two months later. To his chagrin however, Ali did not survive the incident intact. Suharto had decided to address some of the criticisms that had been raised by his critics, including the matter of the amount of power that the Aspri had. Suharto responded to this criticism by disbanding Aspri altogether and thus depriving Ali of a considerable amount of his power. However, shortly afterwards, Ali was promoted to Lieutenant-General.

=== Latter years ===
After Aspri was disbanded, Murtopo did not have as much power or the leeway to use it as he did in the first few years of the regime. He was however still loyal to Suharto and in turn, Suharto still had confidence in him. When the matter of East Timor's decolonization emerged, Murtopo was entrusted with heading Operasi Komodo in early 1975, a covert operation set up with the hopes of having East Timor integrate with Indonesia with the help of pro-Indonesian forces in East Timor and without Indonesia having to resort to military means. He was also part of the diplomacy, being sent as a special envoy to Portugal to gauge the opinion of East Timor's then colonial rulers and give a warning to the East Timorese in August 1975 that Indonesia would not tolerate an independent East Timor under the government of Fretilin.

In 1977, Murtopo was plagued by health problems but nevertheless he still had ambitions for the future; hoping that he would either be made the Head of Bakin or become the Minister of Home Affairs. Ali got neither position, being named instead in 1978 as the Minister of Information in the Third Development Cabinet. After five years serving as a Minister, Murtopo became the Vice Chairman of the Supreme Advisory Council (DPA).

== Death ==
Ali Murtopo died on 15 May 1984. He was buried at the Kalibata Heroes' Cemetery in Jakarta.

== Additional reading ==
- Moertopo, Ali. 1972. Some Basic Thoughts on the Acceleration and Modernization of 25 Years’ Development. Jakarta: Yayasan Proklamasi, Centre for Strategic and International Studies, originally published as Dasar-dasar Pemikiran tentang Akselerasi Modernisasi Pembangunan 25 Tahun.
- Centre for Strategic and International Studies. 2004. Ali Moertopo 1924 - 1984. Jakarta: Centre for Strategic and International Studies, ISBN 979-8026-85-3.
- Tempo. 2017. Ali Moertopo, Jakarta: KPG (Kepustakaan Populer Gramedia), ISBN 978-602-424-347-0.
