= List of ministers of human rights (Indonesia) =

Ministry of Human Rights (Indonesia)
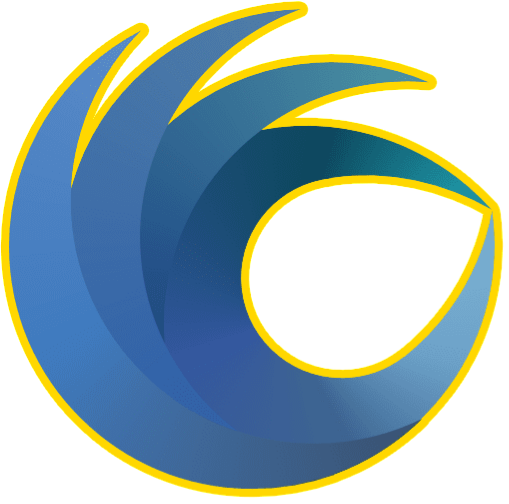

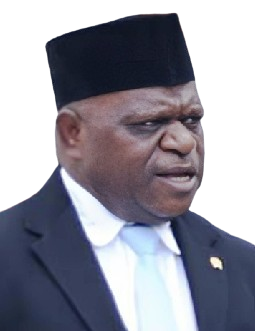
- Incumbent; Natalius Pigai since 21 October 2024
- Appointer: President of Indonesia
- Inaugural holder: Hasballah M. Saad
- Formation: 29 October 1999

The Minister of Human Rights of Indonesia is the head of the Ministry of Human Rights of the Republic of Indonesia. This position began on 29 October 1999 and was first held by Hasballah M. Saad under the name of Minister of State for Human Rights. Subsequently, this position together with the Minister of Law and the Minister of Immigration and Corrections were combined into the Indonesian Minister of Law and Human Rights, which was then separated again.

== List of minister ==
#	Portrait	Name (Bord–Died)	Political party	Cabinet	Duration		Note
#	Portrait	Name (Bord–Died)	Political party	Cabinet	Took office	Left office	Note
1		Hasballah M. Saad (1948–2011)	National; Mandate	National; Unity	29 October 1999	28 August 2000	(Note: As State Ministers of Human Rights)
Merged into the Minister of Justice and Human Rights				National; Unity	28 August 2000	23 July 2001	
Merged into the Minister of Law and Human Rights (2001–2024)
2		Natalius Pigai (1975–)	Independent	Red & White	21 October 2024	Incumbent	(Note: As Minister of Human Rights)

Minister name

== See also ==
- Cabinet of Indonesia
- Ministry of Human Rights
