= Abdurrahman Wahid =

President of Indonesia from 1999 to 2001

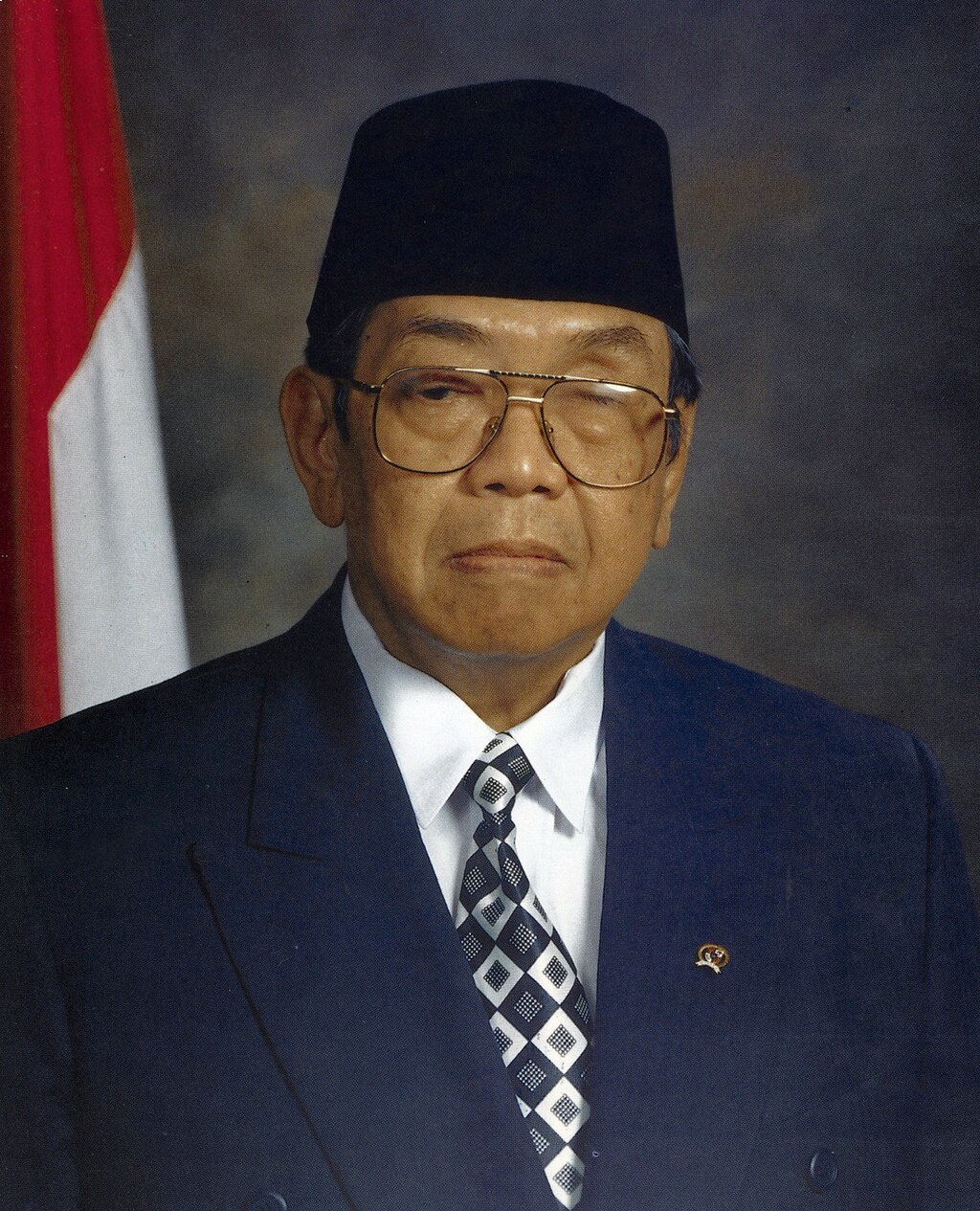
- Official portrait, 1999

4th President of Indonesia
- In office 20 October 1999 – 23 July 2001
- Vice President: Megawati Sukarnoputri
- Preceded by: B. J. Habibie
- Succeeded by: Megawati Sukarnoputri

Chairman of Nahdlatul Ulama
- In office 1984–1999
- Preceded by: Idham Chalid
- Succeeded by: Hasyim Muzadi

Personal details
- Born: Abdurahman ad-Dakhil; 7 September 1940 Djombang, Dutch East Indies
- Died: 30 December 2009 (aged 69) Jakarta, Indonesia
- Resting place: Jombang, East Java, Indonesia
- Party: PKB
- Spouse: Sinta Nuriyah (m. 1968)
- Children: 4, including Yenny Wahid
- Parents: Wahid Hasyim (father); Siti Sholehah (mother)
- Relatives: Hasyim Asy'ari (grandfather); Salahuddin Wahid (brother)
- Education: Al-Azhar University; University of Baghdad
- Occupation: Politician; journalist
- Awards: National Hero (2025)
- Website: gusdur.net
- Nickname: Gus Dur
- Abdurrahman Wahid's voice Wahid delivering his presidential inauguration speech in front of the parliament Recorded 20 October 1999

Abdurrahman Wahid (/ˌɑːbdʊəˈrɑːxmɑːn wɑːˈhiːd/ AHB-doo-RAHKH-mahn wah-HEED; Indonesian: [abduˌrahman ˈwahid]; né ad-Dakhil, 7 September 1940 – 30 December 2009), more colloquially known as Gus Dur (Indonesian: [ˌɡʊs ˈdʊr]), was an Indonesian politician and Islamic religious leader who served as the fourth president of Indonesia, from his election in 1999 until he was removed from office in 2001. A long time leader within the Nahdlatul Ulama organization, he was the founder of the National Awakening Party (PKB). He also received the Ramon Magsaysay Award for his services to democratization and human rights in Indonesia. He was the son of former Minister of Religious Affairs Wahid Hasyim, and the grandson of Nahdatul Ulama founder Hasyim Asy'ari. Due to a visual impairment caused by glaucoma, he was blind in the left eye and roughly 80% blind in his right eye. He was the first (and to date only) president of Indonesia to have had physical disabilities.

Wahid was instrumental in lifting the ban on Chinese New Year (Indonesian: Imlek). Until 1998, the spiritual practice to celebrate the Chinese New Year by Chinese families was restricted specifically only inside of Chinese community centers, a restriction made by the New Order government through Presidential Instruction No. 14 of 1967 signed by Suharto. On 17 January 2000, Abdurrahman issued Presidential Decree No. 6 of 2000 to annul the previous instruction. He established Confucianism as the sixth official religion in Indonesia in 2000 and protected minority rights in Indonesia. As a result, Abdurrahman was given the title "Father of Pluralism".

His popular nickname 'Gus Dur' is derived from Gus, a common honorific for a son of kyai, and from the short-form of bagus ('handsome lad' in Javanese); and Dur, short-form of his name, Abdurrahman.

== Early life and family ==
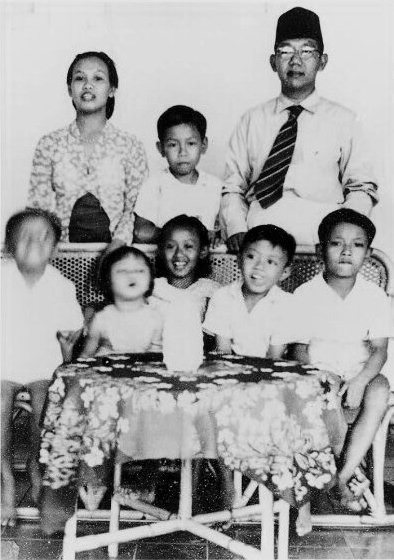
Abdurrahman Wahid standing between his mother and father, and behind his siblings and a friend of the family, circa 1952

Abdurrahman ad-Dakhil was born on the fourth day of the Sha'ban, the eighth month of the Islamic calendar in 1940 in Jombang, to Abdul Wahid Hasyim and Siti Sholehah. This led to a belief that he was born on 4 August; instead, using the Islamic calendar to mark his birth date meant that he was actually born on 4 Sha'aban, equivalent to 7 September 1940 in the Gregorian calendar.

He was named after Abd ar-Rahman I of the Umayyad Caliphate who brought Islam to Spain and was thus nicknamed "ad-Dakhil" ("the conqueror"). His name is stylized in the traditional Arabic naming system as "Abdurrahman, son of Wahid". The name Abdurrahman Wahid means "Servant of Mercy the First." Abdurrahman was of Chinese, Arab and Javanese ancestry. From his paternal line, he was descended from a well-known Muslim missionary from China known as Syekh Abdul Qadir Tan Kiem Han who was a disciple of Sunan Ngampel-Denta (Raden Rahmat Bong Swie Hoo), one of the Nine Wali (Holy Islamic Saints) who became one of the first Islamic Kings on Java who Islamicized Java in the 15–16th centuries.

He was the oldest of his five siblings, and was born into a prestigious family in the East Java Muslim community. His paternal grandfather, Hasyim Asy'ari was the founder of Nahdlatul Ulama (NU) while his maternal grandfather, Bisri Syansuri was the first Muslim educator to introduce classes for women.

After the Indonesian Declaration of Independence on 17 August 1945, Abdurrahman Wahid moved back to Jombang and remained there during the fight for independence from the Netherlands during the Indonesian National Revolution. At the end of the war in 1949, Abdurrahman Wahid moved to Jakarta as his father had been appointed Minister of Religious Affairs. He was educated in Jakarta, going to KRIS Primary School before moving to Matraman Perwari Primary School. Abdurrahman Wahid was encouraged to read non-Muslim books, magazines, and newspapers by his father to further broaden his horizons. He stayed in Jakarta with his family even after his father's removal as Minister of Religious Affairs in 1952. On 19 April 1953, Wahid Hasyim died in a car crash in Cimahi.

In 1954, Abdurrahman Wahid began junior high school. That year, he failed to graduate to the next year and was forced to repeat. His mother made the decision to send him to Yogyakarta to continue his education. In 1957, after graduating from junior high school, he moved to Magelang to begin his Muslim education at Tegalrejo Pesantren (Muslim school). He completed the pesantren course in two years instead of the usual four. In 1959, he moved back to Jombang to Pesantren Tambakberas. There, while continuing his own education, Abdurrahman Wahid received his first job as a teacher and later on as headmaster of a madrasah affiliated with the pesantren. Abdurrahman Wahid found employment as a journalist for magazines such as Horizon and Majalah Budaya Jaya.

== Overseas education ==
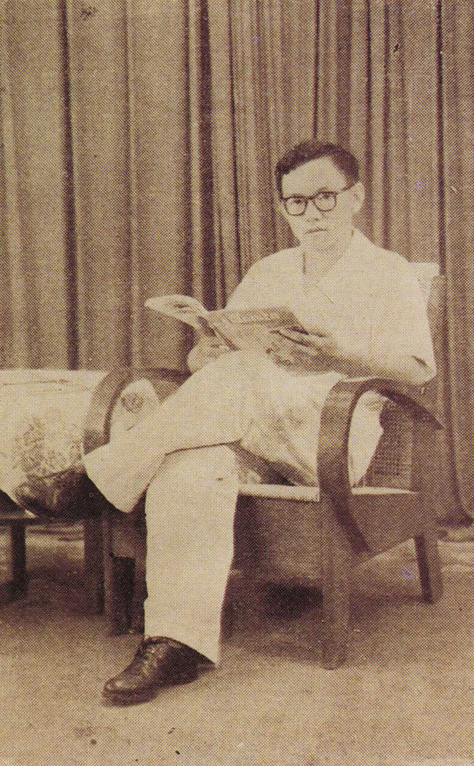
Abdurrahman Wahid as a young man, ca. 1960s

In 1963, Abdurrahman Wahid received a scholarship from the Ministry of Religious Affairs to study at Al Azhar University in Cairo, Egypt. He left for Egypt in November 1963. Unable to provide evidence to certify that he spoke Arabic, Abdurrahman was told when arriving that he would have to take a remedial class in the language before enrolling at the university's Higher Institute for Islamic and Arabic studies.

Instead of attending classes, Abdurrahman Wahid spent 1964 enjoying life in Egypt, watching European and American movies as well as indulging in his hobby of watching football. Abdurrahman was also involved with the Association of Indonesian Students and became a journalist for the association's magazine. After passing the remedial Arabic examination, he finally began studies at the Higher Institute for Islamic and Arabic Studies in 1965, but was disappointed as he had already studied a number of the texts offered at the Institute in Java and disapproved of the rote learning method used by the university.

In Egypt, Abdurrahman Wahid found employment with the Indonesian Embassy. It was during his stint with the embassy that coup attempt was launched by the 30 September Movement, which the Communist Party of Indonesia was accused of leading. With Army Strategic Reserves commander Major General Suharto taking control of the situation in Jakarta, a crackdown against suspected communists was initiated. The Indonesian Embassy in Egypt was ordered to conduct an investigation into the political views of university students. This order was passed to Abdurrahman Wahid, who was charged with writing the reports.

Abdurrahman's displeasure at the method of education and his work following the coup attempt distracted him from his studies. He sought and received another scholarship at the University of Baghdad and moved to Iraq. There Abdurrahman Wahid continued his involvement with the Association of Indonesian Students as well as with writing journalistic pieces to be read in Indonesia.

After completing his education at the University of Baghdad in 1970, Abdurrahman Wahid went to the Netherlands to continue his education. He wanted to attend Leiden University but was disappointed as there was little recognition for the studies that he had undertaken at the University of Baghdad. From the Netherlands, he went to Germany and France before returning to Indonesia in 1971.

== Early career ==
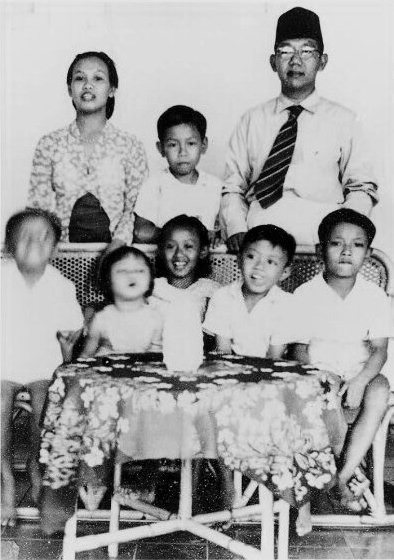
https://www.google.com/search/contributions/profile

Abdurrahman Wahid returned to Jakarta expecting that in a year's time, he would be abroad again to study at McGill University in Canada. He kept himself busy by joining the Institute for Economic and Social Research, Education and Information (LP3ES), an organization which consisted of intellectuals with progressive Muslims and social-democratic views. LP3ES established the magazine Prisma and Abdurrahman became one of the main contributors to the magazine. Whilst working as a contributor for LP3ES, he also conducted tours to pesantren and madrasah across Java. It was a time when pesantren were desperate to gain state funding by adopting state-endorsed curricula and Abdurrahman was concerned that the traditional values of the pesantren were being damaged because of this change. He was also concerned with the poverty of the pesantren which he saw during his tours. At the same time as it was encouraging pesantren to adopt state-endorsed curricula, the Government was also encouraging pesantren as agents for change and to help assist the government in the economic development of Indonesia. It was at this time that Abdurrahman Wahid finally decided to drop plans for overseas studies in favor of promoting the development of the pesantren.

Abdurrahman Wahid continued his career as a journalist, writing for the magazine Tempo and Kompas, a leading Indonesian newspaper. His articles were well received, and he began to develop a reputation as a social commentator. Abdurrahman's popularity was such that at this time he was invited to give lectures and seminars, obliging him to travel back and forth between Jakarta and Jombang, where he now lived with his family.

Despite having a successful career up to that point, Abdurrahman Wahid still found it hard to make ends meet, and he worked to earn extra income by selling peanuts and delivering ice to be used for his wife's es lilin (popsicle) business. In 1974, he found extra employment in Jombang as a Muslim Legal Studies teacher at Pesantren Tambakberas and soon developed a good reputation. A year later, Abdurrahman added to his workload as a teacher of Kitab al-Hikam, a classical text of sufism.

In 1977, Abdurrahman Wahid joined the Hasyim Asyari University as Dean of the Faculty of Islamic Beliefs and Practices. Again he excelled in his job and the university wanted to him to teach extra subjects such as pedagogy, sharia, and missiology. However, his excellence caused some resentment from within the ranks of university and he was blocked from teaching the subjects. Whilst undertaking all these ventures he also regularly delivered speeches during Ramadan to the Muslim community in Jombang.

== Leader of Nahdlatul Ulama ==
=== Early involvement with NU ===
Nahdlatul Ulama is the largest religious organization in Indonesia, Mr Wahid led this organization for 15 years (1984-1999)

Abdurrahman's family background meant that sooner or later, he would be asked to play an active role in the running of Nahdlatul Ulama (NU). This ran contrary to Abdurrahman's aspirations of becoming a public intellectual and he had twice rejected offers to join the NU Religious Advisory Council. Nevertheless, Abdurrahman finally chose to join the Council when his own grandfather, Bisri Syansuri gave him the third offer. In taking this job, Abdurrahman also made the decision to move from Jombang to Jakarta and to permanently reside there. As a member of the Religious Advisory Council, Abdurrahman envisioned himself as a reformer of NU.

At this time, Abdurrahman Wahid also had his first political experience. In the lead-up to the 1982 Legislative Elections, Abdurrahman Wahid campaigned for the United Development Party (PPP), an Islamist Party which was formed as a result of a merger of four Islamist parties including NU. Abdurrahman Wahid recalled that the Government actively disrupted PPP's campaigns by arresting people like himself. However, Abdurrahman Wahid always managed to secure his release, thanks to his connections to high-ranking officials and military figures.

=== Reformation of NU ===
After the 1982 general election, many NU members were dissatisfied because their members were excluded from the PPP's list of permanent candidates for the DPR. This dissatisfaction increased because many younger NU members (including Abdurrahman) wanted NU to abandon the PPP and return to its original principles (not being a political party but dealing solely with social and religious affairs). Many young cadres viewed NU as a stagnant organization. After careful discussion, the Religious Advisory Council finally formed a Seven-Man Team (which included Abdurrahman) to address reform issues and help revitalize NU. For some NU members, reform within the organization involved a change in leadership. On 2 May 1982, a group of high-ranking NU officials met with NU chairman Idham Chalid and asked for his resignation. Idham, who had guided the NU in the transition from Sukarno to Suharto resisted at first but bowed down to pressure. On 6 May 1982, Abdurrahman Wahid heard of Idham's decision to resign and approached him saying that the demands being made for him to resign were unconstitutional. With urging from Abdurrahman Wahid, Idham withdrew his resignation and Abdurrahman Wahid, together with the Team of Seven was able to negotiate a compromise between Idham and those who had asked for his resignation.

In 1983, Suharto was re-elected to a fourth term as president by the People's Consultative Assembly (MPR) and began taking steps to establish the Pancasila state ideology as the sole basis for all organizations. From June 1983 to October 1983, Abdurrahman was part of a team which was commissioned to prepare the NU's response to this issue. Abdurrahman consulted texts such as the Quran and Sunnah for justification and finally, in October 1983, concluded that the NU should accept Pancasila as its ideology. To further revitalize the NU, Abdurrahman was also successful in securing its withdrawal from PPP and party politics to allow it focus on social matters instead of hampering itself by being involved in politics.

=== Election to chairmanship and first term as chairman ===
Three months before the NU Congress, the Tanjung Priok riots occurred between Muslims and the military. Many casualties, especially among Muslims, occurred. Abdurrahman was present to help the victims and calm the situation after the riots. He cleaned up the blood of the victims and led Friday prayers after the incident, as many people were traumatized by the incident.

As his younger brother pointed out, a week after the incident, relations between the government and Muslims became strained. ABRI Commander Benny Moerdani felt the need to calm the situation, but he needed someone to act as a mediator. Abdurrahman arrived and successfully mediated the tense relationship between the government and Muslims by accompanying ABRI Commander Benny Moerdani on visits to Islamic boarding schools (pesantren).

Abdurrahman's reforms had made him popular within the ranks of NU. By the time of the 1984 National Congress, some began to state their intentions to nominate Abdurrahman as the new chairman of NU. Abdurrahman accepted the nomination, provided that he had the power to choose who would be on his leadership team. Abdurrahman was elected as the new chairman of NU during the National Congress NU. However, his stipulation of choosing his own team was not honored. The last day of the Congress had begun with Abdurrahman's list of team members being approved by high-ranking NU officials including outgoing Chairman Idham. Abdurrahman had gone to the Committee in charge of running the Congress and handed in his list which was to be announced later. However, the Committee in question was against Idham and announced a totally different list of people. Abdurrahman was outraged but was pressured to accept the changes made.

Abdurrahman's ascendancy to the NU chairmanship was seen positively by Suharto and his New Order regime. Abdurrahman's acceptance of Pancasila along with his moderate image won him favor among Government ranks. In 1985, Suharto made Abdurrahman a Pancasila indoctrinator. In 1987, Abdurrahman showed further support for the regime by criticizing PPP in the lead-up to the 1987 Legislative Elections and further strengthening Suharto's Golkar Party. His reward came in the form of a membership of the MPR. Although he was viewed favorably by the regime, Abdurrahman remained a counterweight to the regime by criticizing the Government regarding the World Bank-funded Kedung Ombo Dam project. Although this somewhat soured the cordial relationships that Abdurrahman had with the Government, Suharto was still keen on getting political support from NU.

During his first term as chairman of NU, Abdurrahman focused on reform of the pesantren education system and was successful in increasing the quality of pesantren education system so that it can match up with secular schools. In 1987, Abdurrahman also set up study groups in Probolinggo to provide a forum for like-minded individuals within NU to discuss and provide interpretations to Muslim texts. Critics accused Abdurrahman of wishing to replace the Arabic Muslim greeting of "assalamualaikum" with the secular greeting of "selamat pagi", which means good morning in Indonesian.

=== Second term as chairman and opposing the New Order ===
Abdurrahman was re-elected to a second term as chairman of NU at the 1989 National Congress. In October 1990, following the banning of the tabloid Monitor, which negatively affected the government's image, particularly among Muslims. Suharto, engaged in a political battle with the ABRI faction, began courting Muslim constituents to win their support. This venture reached a turning point in December 1990 with the formation of the Indonesian Association of Muslim Intellectuals (Ikatan Cendekiawan Muslim Indonesia or ICMI). This organization was backed by Suharto, chaired by BJ Habibie and included Muslim intellectuals such as Amien Rais and Nurcholish Madjid as its members. In June 1991, Suharto also performed the Hajj pilgrimage for the first time and added the name Muhammad to his first name.

In 1991, various members of ICMI asked Abdurrahman to join. Abdurrahman declined because he thought that ICMI encouraged sectarianism and that it was mainly a means by which Suharto manoeuvered to remain powerful. In March 1991, Abdurrahman opposed ICMI by forming the Democracy Forum, an organization which contained 45 intellectuals from various religious and social communities. Suharto viewed Abdurrahman's involvement as disobedient to the government. The organization was viewed as a threat by the government, which then attempted to disband the Democracy Forum's meetings. In March 1992, three months before the 1992 elections, Abdurrahman Wahid planned to have a Great Assembly to celebrate the 66th anniversary of the founding of NU and to reiterate the organization's support for Pancasila. Abdurrahman Wahid had planned for the event to be attended by at least one million NU members. However, Suharto moved to block the event, ordering policemen to turn back busloads of NU members as they arrived in Jakarta. Nevertheless, the event managed to attract 200,000 attendants. After the event, Abdurrahman Wahid wrote a letter of protest to Suharto saying that NU had not been given a chance to display a brand of Islam that was open, fair, and tolerant.

During his second term as chairman of NU, Abdurrahman's liberal ideas had begun to turn a number of supporters sour. As chairman, Abdurrahman Wahid continued to promote inter-faith dialogue and even bridged good relations by accepting an invitation to visit Israel in October 1994.

=== Third term as chairman and the lead-up to Reformasi ===
As the 1994 National Congress approached, Abdurrahman Wahid nominated himself for a third term as chairman. Hearing this, Suharto wanted to make sure that Abdurrahman Wahid was not elected. In the weeks leading up to the Congress, Suharto supporters, such as Habibie and Harmoko campaigned against Abdurrahman's re-election. When it came time for the National Congress, the site for the Congress was tightly guarded by ABRI in an act of intimidation. Despite this, and attempts to bribe NU members to vote against him, Abdurrahman Wahid was re-elected as NU chairman for a third term. During his third term, Abdurrahman Wahid began to move closer towards a political alliance with Megawati Sukarnoputri from the Indonesian Democratic Party (PDI). Capitalizing on her father's legacy, Megawati had a lot of popularity and intended to put political and moral pressure on Suharto's regime. Abdurrahman advised Megawati to be cautious and avoid running for president ahead of the 1997 elections. Megawati ignored Abdurrahman's advice and paid the price in July 1996 when her PDI headquarters was taken over by supporters of the government-backed PDI chairman, Suryadi.

Seeing what happened to Megawati, Abdurrahman thought that his best option now was to retreat politically by getting himself back in favor with the Government. In November 1996, Abdurrahman Wahid and Suharto met for the first time since Abdurrahman's re-election to the NU chairmanship and this was followed over the next few months by meetings with various Government people who in 1994 had attempted to block Abdurrahman's re-election. At the same time, however, Abdurrahman Wahid kept his options for reform open and in December 1996, had a meeting with Amien Rais, an ICMI member who had grown critical of the regime.

July 1997 saw the beginning of the Asian Financial Crisis. Suharto began to lose control of the situation and just as he was being pushed to step up the reform movement with Megawati and Amien, Abdurrahman experienced a stroke in January 1998. From his hospital bed, Abdurrahman Wahid continued to see the situation worsen with Suharto's re-election to a seventh term as president accompanied by student protests. The protests would turn into riots in May 1998 after the killing of four students at Trisakti University. On 19 May 1998, Abdurrahman Wahid, together with eight prominent leaders from the Muslim community were summoned to Suharto's residence. Suharto outlined the idea of a Reform Committee which he had begun to propose at the time. All nine rejected Suharto's offer to join the Reform Committee. Abdurrahman Wahid maintained a more moderate stance with Suharto and called on the protesting to stop to see if Suharto was going to implement his promise. This displeased Amien who was one of the most vocal of Suharto's critics at the time. Nevertheless, support for Suharto quickly ebbed away, and he resigned the presidency on 21 May 1998. Vice President Habibie became president.

== Reformasi era ==
=== Formation of PKB and the Ciganjur statement ===
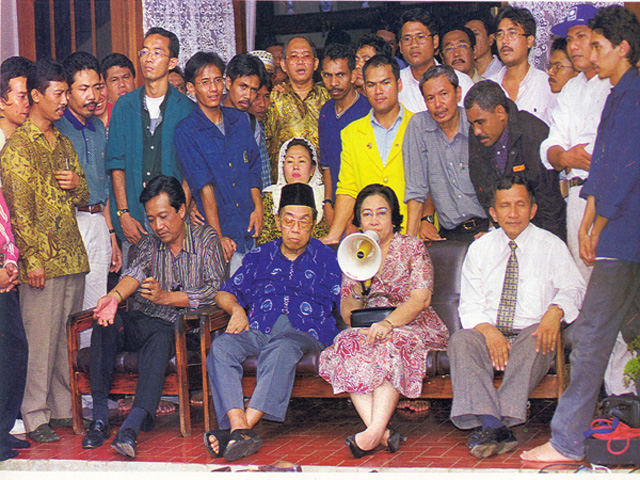
Megawati Sukarnoputri, Amien Rais, and Sultan Hamengkubuwono X at Wahid's residence in Ciganjur, South Jakarta. The Ciganjur Statement was issued, calling for democratic reform and reducing the military's influence in politics.

One of the immediate effects of Suharto's fall was the formation of new political parties. Under Suharto's regime, political parties had been limited to just three; Golkar, PPP, and PDI. Now with his fall, new political parties were formed, the most prominent of which were Amien's National Mandate Party (PAN) and Megawati's Indonesian Democratic Party of Struggle (PDI-P). In June 1998, some from within the NU community began pressuring Abdurrahman Wahid to form a new political party. Abdurrahman Wahid did not warm up to the idea immediately, thinking that this would result in a political party which only catered to one religion. He was also unwilling to overrule his own decision to take NU out of politics. By July 1998, however, he began to warm up to the idea, thinking that establishing a political party was the only way to challenge the organizationally strong Golkar in an election. With that in mind, Abdurrahman Wahid approved of the formation of PKB and became the chairman of its Advisory Council with Matori Abdul Djalil as party chairman. Although it was clearly dominated by NU members, Abdurrahman Wahid promoted the PKB as a party that was non-sectarian and open to all members of society.

As opposition to the government, Abdurrahman Wahid, together with Megawati and Amien were willing to adopt a moderate stance towards Habibie's Government, preferring instead to wait for the 1999 legislative elections. Nevertheless, in November 1998, in a meeting at his residence in the Jakarta suburb of Ciganjur, Abdurrahman, together with Megawati, Amien, and Sultan Hamengkubuwono X reiterated their commitment to reform. On 7 February 1999, PKB officially declared Abdurrahman Wahid as their presidential candidate.

=== 1999 elections and MPR General Session ===
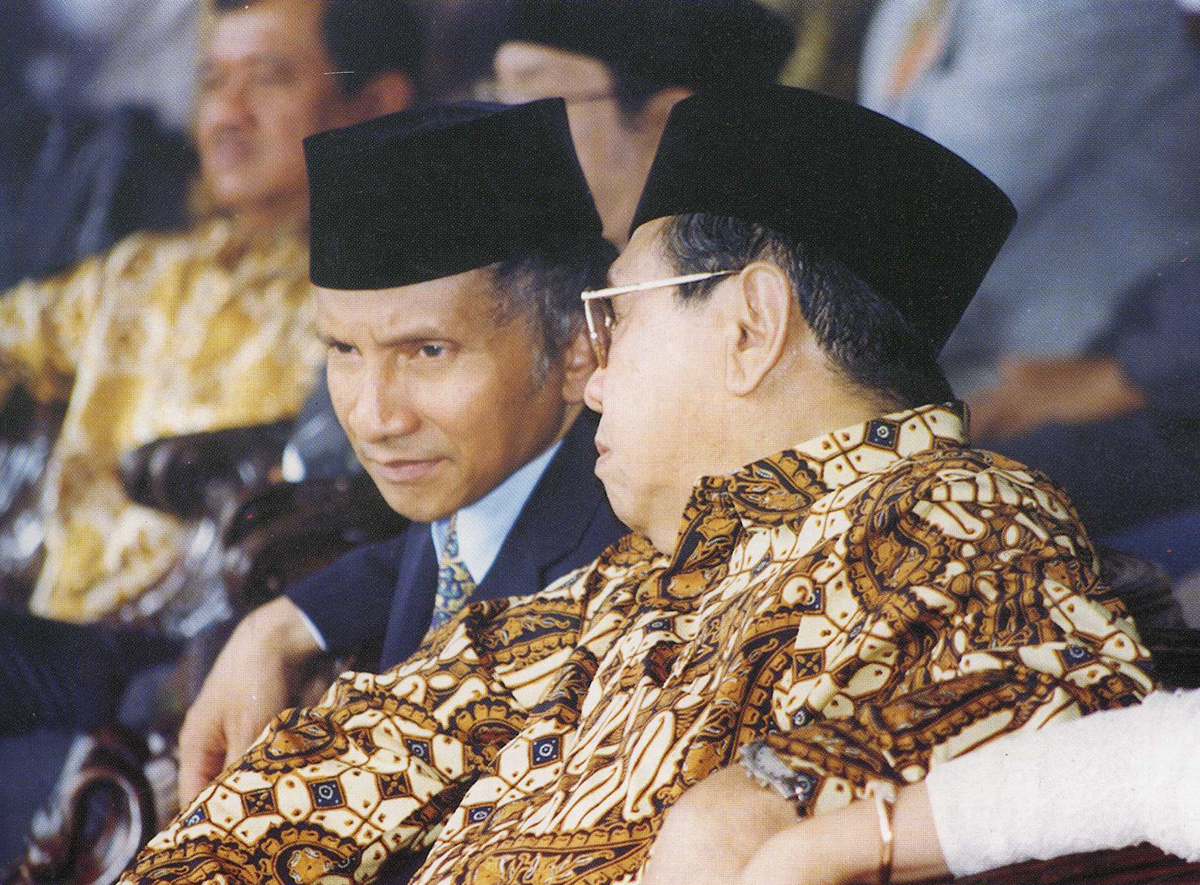
Amien Rais and Abdurrahman Wahid conversing during a session of the MPR

In June 1999, Abdurrahman's PKB entered the legislative elections. The PKB won 12% of the votes with Megawati's PDI-P winning the legislative elections with 33% of the votes. With her party decisively winning the legislative elections, Megawati expected to win the presidency against Habibie at the MPR General Session. However, the PDI-P did not have complete majority and formed a loose alliance with the PKB. In July, however, Amien Rais would form the Central Axis, a coalition of Muslim parties. The Central Axis then began to consider nominating Abdurrahman as a third candidate in the presidential race and the PKB's commitment towards PDI-P began to waver.

In October 1999, the MPR convened and Abdurrahman threw his support behind Amien, who was elected as the chairman of the MPR. On 7 October 1999, Amien and the Central Axis, who now had the PKB on their side, officially nominated Abdurrahman as a presidential candidate. On 19 October 1999, the MPR rejected Habibie's accountability speech and Habibie withdrew from the presidential race. In the hours that followed, Akbar Tanjung, chairman of Golkar and head of the People's Representative Council (DPR) made it clear that Golkar would support Abdurrahman in his bid for the presidency. On 20 October 1999, the MPR convened and began voting for a new president. Abdurrahman Wahid was elected as Indonesia's fourth president with 373 votes to Megawati's 313 votes.

Displeased that their candidate had not won the presidency, Megawati's supporters began to riot. Abdurrahman realized that for this to stop, Megawati had to be elected as vice president. After convincing General Wiranto not to contest vice presidential elections and getting the PKB to endorse Megawati, Abdurrahman Wahid persuaded the demoralized Megawati to stand. On 21 October 1999, Megawati defeated Hamzah Haz of the PPP by 396 votes to 284, and was inaugurated as vice president.

== Presidency (1999–2001) ==
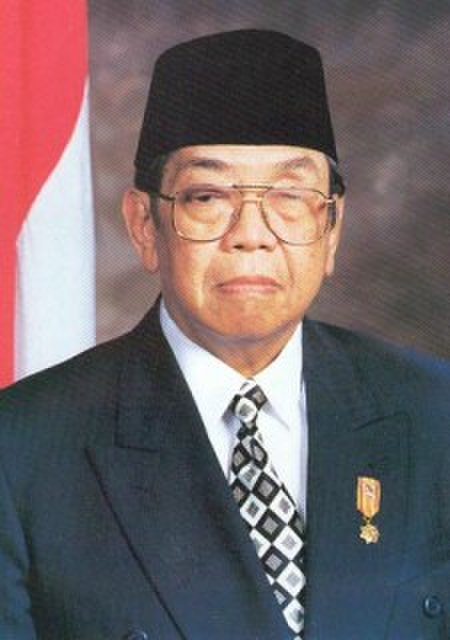
- Presidency of Abddurahman Wahid; 20 October 1999 – 21 July 2001
- Cabinet: National Unity Cabinet
- Party: National Awakening
- Election: 1999
- Seat: Istana Negara
- Seal of the President of Indonesia

=== Early presidency (1999) ===
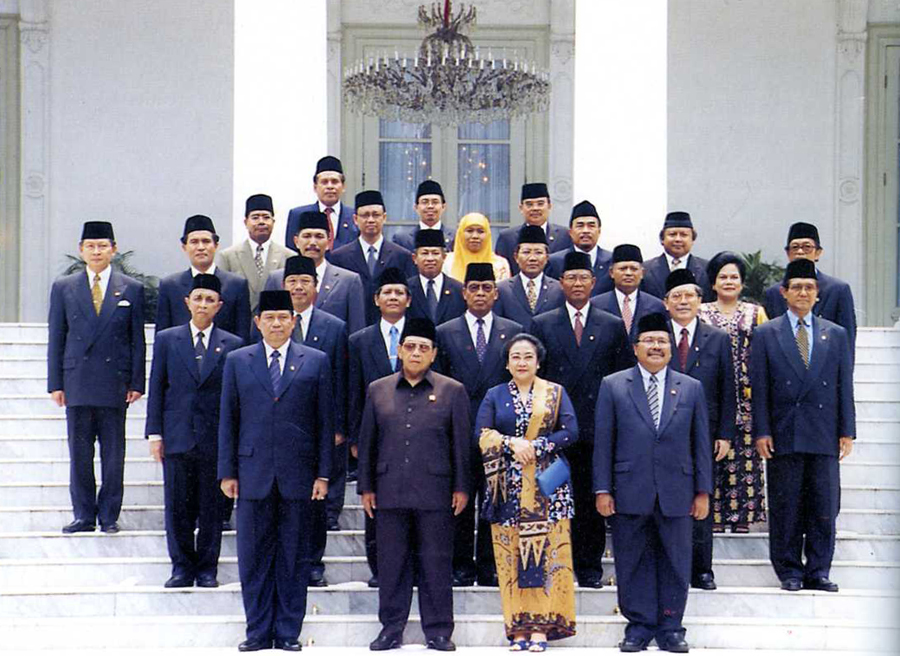
President Abdurrahman Wahid and his Cabinet

Abdurrahman's first cabinet, known as the National Unity Cabinet, was a coalition composed of members from several political parties, including the Indonesian Democratic Party of Struggle (PDI-P), the National Awakening Party (PKB), Golkar, the United Development Party (PPP), the National Mandate Party (PAN), and the Justice Party (PK). The cabinet also included non-partisan members and representatives from the Indonesian National Armed Forces (TNI), previously known as ABRI. Upon assuming office, Abdurrahman implemented two significant administrative reforms. The first was the abolition of the Ministry of Information, which had served as the Suharto regime's principal tool for media control. The second was the disbandment of the Ministry of Social Affairs, which had developed a reputation for corruption and extortion during the New Order period. Abdurrahman Wahid was Indonesia's first indirectly democratically elected president.

In November, Abdurrahman embarked on his first international tour, visiting fellow ASEAN member states, Japan, the United States, Qatar, Kuwait, and Jordan. He followed up this initiative in December with a visit to China.

After just a month following the cabinet's formation, Coordinating Minister of People's Welfare Hamzah Haz resigned in November. The resignation sparked speculation, with some suggesting it stemmed from Abdurrahman's allegation—made while still in the United States—that certain cabinet members were involved in corruption. Others posited that Haz stepped down in protest against Abdurrahman's conciliatory approach toward Israel.

Regarding the conflict in Aceh, Abdurrahman proposed a referendum. However, unlike the East Timor vote, this referendum would focus on determining various modes of autonomy, not independence. His strategy also involved adopting a softer approach by reducing the number of military personnel deployed in the region. On 30 December, Abdurrahman traveled to Jayapura in Papua, then officially known as Irian Jaya. During the visit, he succeeded in persuading Papuan leaders that he was committed to change. Notably, he endorsed the use of the term "Papua" to refer to the province.

=== Foreign Affairs ===
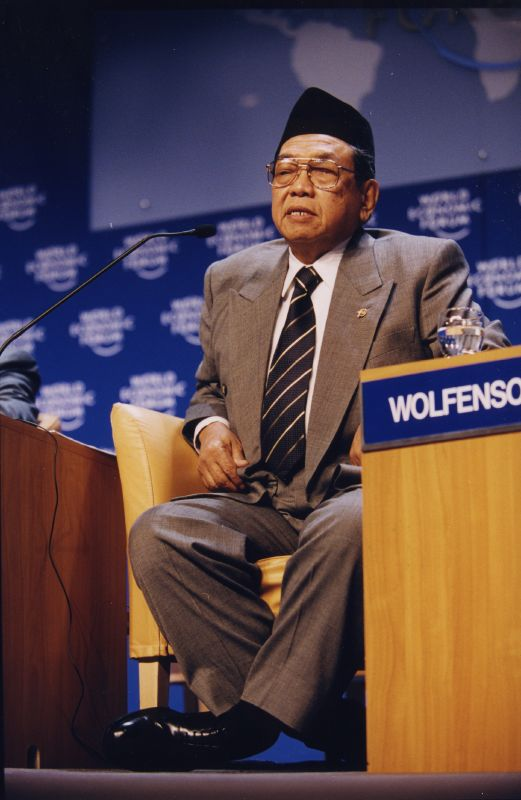
President Abdurrahman Wahid at the 2000 annual meeting of the World Economic Forum

In January, President Abdurrahman Wahid traveled overseas to attend the World Economic Forum in Switzerland, stopping in Saudi Arabia on his return to Indonesia. In February, he embarked on another international tour, visiting the United Kingdom, France, the Netherlands, Germany, and Italy. On his return journey, he also stopped in India, South Korea, Thailand, and Brunei. In March, Wahid visited East Timor , becoming the first Indonesian president to visit the country since its separation., followed by a trip to South Africa in April, en route to the G77 summit in Cuba. He returned to Indonesia via Mexico City and Hong Kong. In June, he again visited the United States, Japan, and France, while adding Iran, Pakistan, and Egypt to the list of countries he had officially visited. Wahid expressed admiration for Prime Minister of Malaysia Mahathir Mohamad's financial independence and his defiance of the International Monetary Fund (IMF).

He also attempted to establish trade relations with Israel, which sparked a strong reaction from many Muslim organizations. This initiative was a bold move by him intended to improve relations between Indonesia and the West, which had been strained by the East Timor crisis, along with Wahid's membership in the Shimon Peres Foundation, causing diplomatic tensions with Palestinian representatives in Indonesia. In response to public mischaracterizations of the president's views, Foreign Minister Alwi Shihab demanded the replacement of Palestinian Ambassador Riddhi Awad. Scholar Nurcholish Madjid argued that Wahid's personal neutrality in the Israeli–Palestinian conflict should defer to the pro-Palestinian sentiments of the Indonesian majority. Wahid, who visited Israel six times, defended his stance in an Israeli media interview where he said:

"I think there is a wrong perception that Islam is at odds with Israel. This is due to Arab propaganda. We must distinguish between Arabs and Muslims. Some people in Indonesia claim that I am a stooge for the West, but the fact that I am gaining popularity over time dispels this idea, and shows that this is the view of only a small elite. I have always said that China and the Soviet Union owned or had atheism as part of their constitution, but we have a long-term relationship with these two countries. So Israel has a reputation as a nation that upholds God and religion—therefore there is no reason we should fight Israel."

In May 2001, the Indonesian government hosted the G-15 Summit. At the summit, there were a number of agreements and collaborations called the Jakarta Declaration to strengthen Indonesia's position in third world countries.

=== Security and Defence ===
==== Negotiations in Aceh ====
In March 2000, Wahid's government initiated peace negotiations with the Free Aceh Movement (GAM). These negotiations marked the first step forward for the Indonesian government in the conflict with the separatist movement. In May, a memorandum of understanding had been signed, intended to last until early 2001. However, both parties violated the terms before the agreement expired.

==== Relations with the military ====
One of Wahid's key ambitions as president was to reform the military (TNI) and reduce its political influence. In March 2000, he appointed ally Agus Wirahadikusumah as Commander of the Army Strategic Reserve Command (Kostrad). By July, Agus had begun exposing financial irregularities linked to the Dharma Putra Foundation, which was affiliated with Kostrad. The move drew pressure from the military, communicated via Vice President Megawati Sukarnoputri, for Agus to be removed. Wahid initially resisted but ultimately yielded, then proposed Agus for Army Chief of Staff—a nomination that provoked threats of mass military resignations, leading Wahid to withdraw the appointment.

Wahid's relations with the TNI further deteriorated when the radical Islamic militia Laskar Jihad managed to reach the conflict zone in Maluku to assist their Muslim allies in the Maluku sectarian conflict despite orders from Wahid to block their deployment. The group was later found to be receiving arms from the TNI.

==== Regional unrests ====
In September 2000, Wahid declared martial law in Maluku amid escalating violence, fueled in part by Laskar Jihad and allegedly supported by TNI elements. The militia was believed to be financially backed by Fuad Bawazier, Finance Minister in the final cabinet under Suharto. Meanwhile, separatist sentiment in West Papua intensified, marked by the symbolic raising of the Morning Star flag. Wahid permitted the flag to be flown as long as it was lower than the Indonesian national flag, a decision that drew criticism from political elites including Megawati and Akbar. On 24 December 2000, a coordinated series of church bombings occurred in Jakarta and eight other cities.

=== Law enforcement and human righs ===
Law enforcement was a priority of President Wahid's administration. He wanted law enforcement in Indonesia to be firm and authoritative, and for no one to be immune from the law. In March 2000, President Abdurrahman Wahid met with former President Suharto. This meeting was a friendly gathering during his presidency, and he asked the media not to associate it with political issues. Five months later, President Abdurrahman Wahid agreed to investigate former President Suharto's corruption case, but the former President did not attend due to illness.

On September 22, 2000, the Supreme Court, led by Chief Justice Syafiudin Kartasasmita, found Tommy Suharto guilty of corruption and sentenced him to pay a fine and imprisonment, after a lower court had previously acquitted him. On October 31, 2000, Tommy, through his lawyer, asked President Wahid for pardon. Tommy and his family met with President Wahid at a hotel, as previously known, the President wanted the Cendana family to return the proceeds of corruption to the government. On November 2, 2000, President Wahid rejected Tommy Suharto's pardon request and prepared to be executed. On November 3, Tommy Soeharto fled and became a fugitive.

In July 2001, President Wahid was successfully ousted by parliament. On July 26, Judge Syafiudin Kartasasmita, the judge who sentenced Tommy Suharto, was shot. On October 1, 2001, the Supreme Court granted a judicial review request that overturned the previous Supreme Court verdict. On November 28, 2001, Tommy was arrested. On July 26, 2002, Tommy was sentenced to 15 years in prison for the murder of Judge Syafiuddin. Many observers deplored the sentence, as premeditated murder could have been punished more severely.

During his term, President Wahid proposed a review of the 1966 Decree of the Provisional People's Consultative Assembly (MPRS) which banned Marxism–Leninism as inconsistent with the Indonesian Constitution which provides for freedom of association and expression. He also renamed the Senayan Main Stadium to Gelora Bung Karno Stadium restoring its original name from before the New Order era and revoked the presidential decrees that had banned Chinese culture, language, and the Chinese New Year celebration during the New Order period this move opened a new chapter for the freedom and protection of Chinese language and culture in Indonesia. Furthermore, he recognized Confucianism as an official state religion and designated the Chninese New Year as a public holiday, reversing the long standing ban imposed by the New Order regime. He sought to ensure equal rights and protections for all Indonesian citizens without exception. He also enacted the Human Rights Court Law, the Trade Union Law and added Chapter 10A to the Indonesian constitution, covering human rights and recommended the establishment of the Tanjung Priok and East Timor human rights courts in a Presidential Decree. He also appointed the first Minister of Human Rights, Acehnese politician Hasballah M. Saad, and appointed Attorney General Marzuki Darusman, a former member of the National Commission on Human Rights.

While abroad in February 2000, Wahid began calling for the resignation of General Wiranto, who served as Coordinating Minister for Politics and Security. He viewed Wiranto as an impediment to military reform and a political liability due to his alleged human rights violations in East Timor. Although initially persuaded by Wiranto to reconsider, Wahid later reaffirmed his decision and demanded the general's resignation. President Wahid's bold decision to dismiss General Wiranto was praised by various countries, especially the United States, the United Nations, and East Timor, through its Foreign Minister Ramos Horta, who supported President Wahid's steps to reform law enforcement and human rights in Indonesia. These strategic steps taken by President Wahid are believed to have reduced pressure on the international human rights court in the East Timor case.

On April 23, 2001, President Wahid issued a Presidential Decree on the East Timor and Tanjung Priok Human Rights Courts. However, he was ousted by parliament in July, and his successor, President Megawati, revised the decree on the human rights courts on August 1, 2001. On March 14, 2002, the East Timor Human Rights Court began its sessions. The new Attorney General, M.A. Rachman, was appointed as the new Attorney General under Megawati's administration. Unfortunately, only the field perpetrators of human rights violations were named as suspects. Many domestic and international human rights observers were disappointed with Megawati's administration, as was the Tanjung Priok Human Rights Court, which began its sessions on September 15, 2003. The human rights court initiated by President Wahid restored Indonesian confidence in the rule of law and human rights, but the court suffered setbacks, compounded by human rights violations during the reform era, particularly the 2003 Aceh military operation and the murder of human rights activist Munir in 2004.

==== Buloggate and Bruneigate ====
Two financial scandals in 2000 severely impacted Wahid's credibility. In May, the Logistic Affairs Agency (BULOG) reported that US$4 million had gone missing, allegedly collected by Wahid's masseur on his behalf. Although the money was returned, critics accused Wahid of complicity or negligence. Simultaneously, he was criticized for failing to account for a US$2 million donation from the Sultan of Brunei, intended for humanitarian relief in Aceh. Neither case could be proven in court.

=== Rising political opposition ===
==== Dismissals of ministers ====
In April 2000, Wahid dismissed Minister of Industry and Trade Jusuf Kalla and Minister of State-Owned Enterprises Laksamana Sukardi, citing alleged corruption—though he provided no evidence. These dismissals soured Wahid's relations with the major political parties, including Golkar and the Indonesian Democratic Party of Struggle (PDI-P).

Despite his controversies, Wahid remained relatively popular and retained the political support of figures like Megawati, Amien Rais, and Akbar Tandjung. At the 2000 Annual Session of the MPR, Wahid acknowledged his administrative shortcomings and announced plans to delegate daily governance to a senior minister. The MPR supported this move and suggested Megawati for the role. Though no formal resolution was passed, Wahid proceeded with a cabinet reshuffle on 23 August, against Megawati's advice to delay. The new cabinet featured fewer members, prioritized non-partisan figures, and excluded Golkar representatives.

Megawati protested by refusing to attend the cabinet announcement. By the end of 2000, discontent with Wahid's leadership had grown among political elites. Amien Rais, once a key supporter, publicly expressed regret for backing Wahid's presidency and began rallying opposition support, including attempts to persuade Megawati and Akbar to act against him. Megawati remained loyal, while Akbar preferred to wait until the 2004 elections. In November 2000, a petition calling for Wahid's impeachment was signed by 151 members of the DPR.

==== Removal from power (2001) ====
In January 2001, President Wahid declared Chinese New Year an optional national holiday. The following month, he lifted the longstanding ban on the public display of Chinese characters and the importation of Chinese-language publications. That same February, Wahid embarked on a diplomatic visit to North Africa and Saudi Arabia, where he also performed the Hajj pilgrimage. His final overseas trip as president occurred in June 2001, when he traveled to Australia.

On 27 January, Wahid held a meeting with university rectors, during which he warned of the potential for Indonesia to descend into anarchy. He suggested that, if such a situation arose, he might be compelled to dissolve the People's Representative Council (DPR). Although the meeting was meant to be off the record, Wahid's comments sparked significant controversy and intensified opposition efforts to remove him from office. On 1 February, the DPR convened to issue a formal memorandum against Wahid—the first of two required to convene a Special Session of the People's Consultative Assembly (MPR) for presidential impeachment proceedings. The vote overwhelmingly favored the memorandum, with members of Wahid's National Awakening Party (PKB) staging a walkout in protest. The decision prompted widespread demonstrations by Nahdlatul Ulama (NU) members. In East Java, protestors attacked regional offices of the Golkar Party, while in Jakarta, Wahid's critics accused him of orchestrating the unrest. Wahid denied the allegations and personally addressed demonstrators in Pasuruan, urging them to vacate the streets. Despite his appeal, NU supporters continued their demonstrations, and by April, publicly declared their willingness to defend Wahid's presidency at all costs.

In an attempt to counter growing opposition, Wahid dismissed key cabinet members in March. Minister of Justice Yusril Ihza Mahendra was removed for openly calling for Wahid's resignation, and Minister of Forestry Nur Mahmudi Ismail was ousted amid suspicions that he had diverted departmental funds to support anti-government factions. In response, Vice President Megawati Sukarnoputri began distancing herself from Wahid, notably absenting herself from the swearing-in ceremonies for new cabinet members. On 30 April, the DPR issued a second memorandum against Wahid and, the following day, called for an MPR Special Session to be held on 1 August. On 12 June, Wahid reshuffled his cabinet in a last-ditch effort to consolidate political support.

By July, Wahid's position had become increasingly precarious. He ordered Coordinating Minister for Politics and Security Susilo Bambang Yudhoyono to declare a state of emergency. When Yudhoyono refused, Wahid dismissed him. On 20 July, MPR Speaker Amien Rais announced that the Special Session would be advanced to 23 July. The Armed Forces (TNI), whose relations with Wahid had deteriorated during his presidency, deployed 40,000 troops in Jakarta and positioned tanks with turrets aimed at the Presidential Palace in a conspicuous display of force. On the day of the session, Wahid attempted to preempt proceedings by issuing a presidential decree to dissolve the MPR, despite lacking the constitutional authority to do so. The MPR ignored the decree and proceeded with the Special Session, which culminated in a unanimous vote to impeach Wahid. In the same session, the MPR formally appointed Megawati Sukarnoputri as his successor. Although Wahid continued to assert his legitimacy as president and initially refused to vacate the Presidential Palace, he ultimately departed on 25 July for medical treatment in the United States.

The New York Times columnist Seth Mydans describes the situation in Indonesia during his presidency:

"Many admired his leadership of the Muslim group Nahdlatul Ulama, which has a membership of 40 million, and later as president, he championed the rights of minorities, non-Muslims and the often-abused ethnic Chinese community and visited East Timor to apologize for Indonesian atrocities there and he also sought a peaceful solution to secessionist efforts in Aceh and West Papua. Indonesia in the post-Suharto years was a volatile place, rocked by economic collapse, sectarian violence, separatist movements and political turmoil. But his erratic, improvisational and vague speech and his progressive liberal views were sometimes a step ahead of those of his compatriots in the world's most populous Muslim country, and his often shifting statements, elusive political alliances and elusive consensus left him alienated by his supporters and allies in government and parliament"

On November 10, 2025, he was awarded the title of national hero for his services in advocating for minorities and the oppressed in Indonesia.

== Post-presidency (2001–2009) ==
=== Schism within the PKB ===
Following his impeachment, Abdurrahman Wahid turned his attention to Matori Abdul Djalil, the then-chairman of the National Awakening Party (PKB). Prior to the Special Session of the People's Consultative Assembly (MPR), PKB members had agreed to boycott the proceedings in a show of solidarity. However, Matori chose to attend, citing his responsibilities as an MPR vice-chairman and his involvement in the impeachment process. In response, Wahid—acting in his capacity as chairman of the Advisory Council—dismissed Matori as PKB chairman on 15 August 2001, suspended him from party activities, and revoked his membership entirely by November. On 14 January 2002, Matori convened a Special National Congress, attended by his supporters, which re-elected him as PKB chairman. In retaliation, Wahid held a separate National Congress on 17 January, a day after Matori's, where he was re-elected as chairman of the Advisory Council and Alwi Shihab was elected as party chairman. The faction loyal to Wahid became known as PKB Kuningan, while Matori's faction came to be referred to as PKB Batutulis.

=== 2004 legislative and presidential elections ===
The April 2004 legislative elections was won by the Golkar Party, while the National Awakening Party (PKB) secured a place among the top three, garnering 10.6% of the national vote a result that met the threshold required for a party to nominate candidates for president and vice president. In May 2004, the General Elections Commission (KPU) opened the registration period for presidential and vice-presidential candidates. Six pairs of candidates registered; some chose running mates from the leadership ranks of the Golkar Party, while others selected figures from the Islamic organization Nahdlatul Ulama (NU). The PKB nominated Wahid for president, with Marwah Daud Ibrahim a figure from the Golkar Party as his vice-presidential running mate for the July election. However, the pair was disqualified for failing to meet the medical examination requirements mandated by Indonesia’s election laws.

Meanwhile, NU an organization that Wahid had led for 15 years found itself at a crossroads when its general chairman, Hasyim Muzadi, ran for vice president alongside the incumbent, Megawati Sukarnoputri. Wahid criticized Hasyim’s move, arguing that it dragged NU into practical politics. Although his own candidacy was blocked due to his failure to meet the medical examination requirements, Wahid pursued legal action by filing for a judicial review with the Supreme Court to challenge the KPU regulation that led to his disqualification; however, this effort ultimately proved unsuccessful. Speaking at an event at the PBNU headquarters, Wahid explained the reasons behind the attempts to block his candidacy in the presidential election:

"There are parties that want to prevent me from becoming a presidential candidate because I have challenged the status quo. Democracy in Indonesia will only function if two conditions are met: first, the rule of law must be upheld, with everyone adhering to the prevailing regulations; and second, there must be equal treatment for every citizen. If these two conditions are fulfilled, democracy will flourish and all forms of corruption will be exposed and that is precisely why they are afraid of me becoming president."

— Abdurrahman Wahid

On another occasion, CSIS researcher Hadi Soesastro shared his views with several foreign journalists regarding the efforts to block former President Wahid from running in the presidential election:

"In my opinion, such actions are unnecessary; instead, the General Elections Commission (KPU) should allow him to run and let the people decide. I am confident that the public is already well aware of Abdurrahman Wahid’s qualities, given that he has previously served as president."

Despite numerous protests against the General Elections Commission's (KPU) decision, Wahid chose to accept the outcome with grace and abandoned his intention to run in that year's presidential election. Many had already anticipated that Wahid would fail to secure a candidacy; meanwhile, other candidates specifically those who had selected running mates from the Nahdlatul Ulama (NU) organization sought to capture the NU vote. These included the pairs of Megawati and Hasyim, as well as Wiranto and Salahuddin Wahid (the latter being Gus Dur’s own younger brother). Ultimately, Wahid threw his support behind Wiranto, the Golkar Party candidate, whose running mate was none other than Gus Dur’s brother, Salahuddin Wahid. This ticket placed third in the first round of the election. As no candidate secured an absolute majority, a runoff election was held in September between Yudhoyono and Megawati. Wahid chose not to endorse either candidate and decided to abstain from voting. Despite Wahid’s neutral stance, the National Awakening Party (PKB) remained steadfast in its support for a "people’s coalition," thereby backing the Yudhoyono-Kalla ticket. This divergence in position between Gus Dur and the PKB caused the votes of the *Nahdliyin* (NU community) to be split, rather than being cast decisively for a single candidate pair.

=== Opposition to Yudhoyono government ===
In August 2005, Wahid emerged as one of the leaders of the United and Awakened Archipelago Coalition (Koalisi Nusantara Bangkit Bersatu), alongside political figures such as Try Sutrisno, Wiranto, Akbar Tanjung, and Megawati Sukarnoputri. The coalition voiced opposition to the Yudhoyono administration, particularly criticizing the government's decision to reduce fuel subsidies, which they argued would disproportionately raise fuel prices.

In September 2006, Wahid announced his intention to run in the 2009 presidential election, and he reaffirmed this plan in March 2008 during a PKB rally in Banjarmasin, South Kalimantan. He fell ill and later died in 2009.

=== Philanthropic activities ===
Wahid established the Abdurrahman Wahid Institute in 2004, a nonprofit organization based in Jakarta and now led by his daughter, Yenni Wahid. He also served as a patron, board member, and senior advisor to the LibForAll Foundation ("Liberty for All"), which seeks to combat religious extremism and terrorism. On 30 December 2005, Wahid published an article in The Wall Street Journal titled Right Islam vs. Wrong Islam, urging people of goodwill from all faiths and nations to unite against the hatred that fuels terrorism. In an interview for the documentary Inside Indonesia's War on Terrorism, aired by SBS Dateline on 12 October 2005, he shared his suspicions about the possible involvement of the Indonesian government and armed forces in the Bali bombings.

=== Religious views ===
Abdurrahman Wahid said:

All religions insist on peace. From this we might think that the religious struggle for peace is simple ... but it is not. The deep problem is that people use religion wrongly in pursuit of victory and triumph. This sad fact then leads to conflict with people who have different beliefs.

In a 2009 dialogue with Buddhist leader Daisaku Ikeda, Abdurrahman Wahid said:

The original meaning of jihad is "to strive." The jihad conducted by Mohammed was a propagation effort to strive tirelessly to communicate the truth of Allah to others. It is extremely dangerous to stray from that essential meaning... Islam is not a violent religion. It places great importance on love, and the Qur'an forbids the use of force for the sake of religion.

In a 2002 interview with Australian television program, "Foreign Correspondent", Abdurrahman Wahid explained his respect for Israel and posed a challenging "correction" to be addressed by his fellow Muslims:

Israel believes in God. While we have a diplomatic relationship and recognizing diplomatically China and Russia, which are atheist states, then it's strange that we don't acknowledge Israel. This is the thing that we have to correct within Islam.

Abdurrahman Wahid was an advocate of interfaith dialogue and sat on the Board of World Religious Leaders for the Elijah Interfaith Institute.

=== Illness and death ===
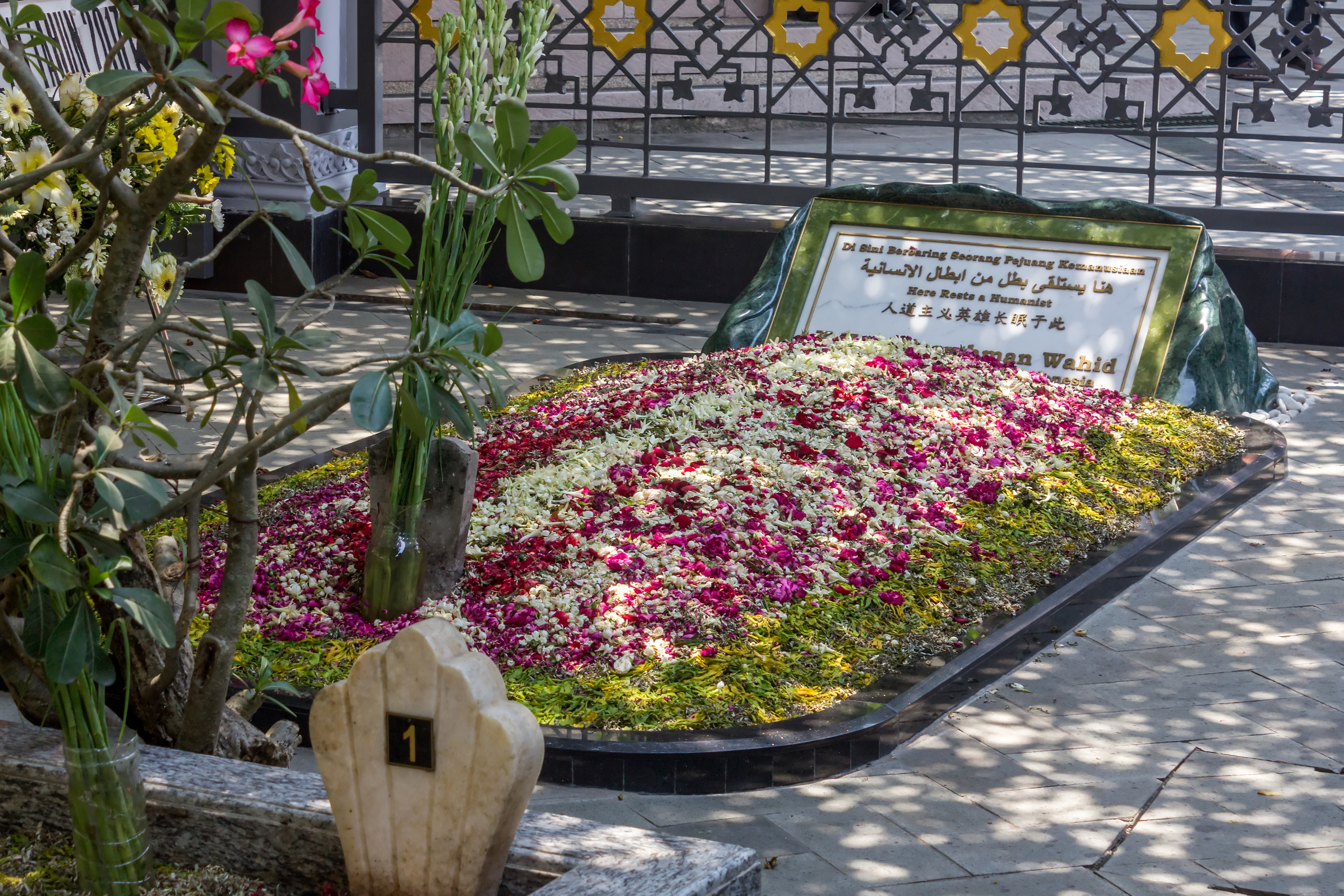
Abdurrahman Wahid's grave in Jombang

In late December 2009, despite deteriorating health and a recent hospital stay, Wahid requested to visit Rembang and Jombang. His condition worsened during the trip, and he was admitted to a hospital in Jombang on 24 December. The next day, he was transferred to Dr. Cipto Mangunkusumo Hospital in Jakarta for dialysis. On 28 December, he underwent dental surgery after complaining of a toothache. Two days later, Wahid died at approximately 6:45 pm local time (UTC+7) due to complications from kidney disorders, heart disease, and diabetes. President Susilo Bambang Yudhoyono visited him shortly before his death. A state funeral was held on 31 December, and flags were flown at half-staff for seven days. Wahid was buried next to his grandparents and parents at his birthplace, Jombang.

== Legacy ==
When Abdurrahman Wahid assumed the presidency of Indonesia, there were initial concerns regarding the direction of his foreign policy. However, his approach ultimately proved more orthodox than his prior rhetoric had suggested. Under his leadership, Indonesia secured international assurances regarding its territorial integrity, and ASEAN remained a central pillar of Jakarta's foreign policy orientation. East Timor continued to be a major point of contention between Indonesia and several Western nations. The United States, in particular, was hesitant to exert excessive pressure on Jakarta, perceiving Wahid's presidency as the least undesirable outcome in terms of both domestic and international policy.

Wahid was widely recognized for his visionary leadership, though he was also among the most controversial figures of his time. His contributions to the Reformasi era included expanding press freedom, exemplified by the dissolution of the Ministry of Information in 1999. A staunch advocate for minority rights, Wahid made a number of bold, sometimes erratic decisions. Notably, he lifted longstanding restrictions on Chinese Indonesians, allowing the open celebration of Chinese New Year and symbolically ending decades of discrimination. For these efforts, he was honored by segments of the Chinese Indonesian community with the title “Father of the Chinese”. Revered as a cleric, Wahid commanded respect from followers of diverse faiths, as well as from non-believers. His dismissal from office, captured in a widely circulated photograph of him waving from the veranda of Merdeka Palace, remains one of the most iconic images in Indonesian political history. His unwavering support for pluralism earned him the title “Father of Pluralism.” Wahid's famous phrase, "Gitu aja kok repot" (lit. 'Why fuss?'), became emblematic in Indonesian political discourse, reflecting his tendency to tackle complex issues with seemingly effortless pragmatism but often stirring controversy.

In August 2021, Indonesian Coordinating Minister for Political, Legal, and Security Affairs, Mahfud MD, publicly stated that Wahid's 2001 impeachment was unconstitutional and unlawful. Speaking on the Nahdlatul Ulama YouTube channel, Mahfud argued that the impeachment violated the People's Consultative Assembly (MPR) Resolution No. III of 1978 concerning the structure and operations of the highest state institutions. He also highlighted inconsistencies among the three memorandums issued by the Special Session of the MPR leading to Wahid's removal.

On 25 September 2024, the MPR formally annulled Resolution No. II/MPR/2001, the legal basis for Wahid's impeachment, thereby posthumously restoring his reputation. On the same day, the MPR also partially revoked Resolution No. XI/MPR/1998, clearing the path for both Wahid and former president Suharto to be considered for National Hero status. Both were officially designated as such on 10 November 2025.

== Personal life ==
=== Marriage and children ===
Abdurrahman Wahid was married to Sinta Nuriyah with whom he had four daughters: Alissa Qotrunnada Munawaroh, Zannuba Arifah Chafsoh (popularly known as Yenny Wahid), Annita Hayatunnufus, and Inayah Wulandari.

=== Health issues ===
Abdurrahman Wahid was visually impaired throughout his presidency, although some claimed that he was able to see without assistance. Nevertheless, during his inauguration as president, he was helped by an army officer who acted as an assistant by re-reading the text of presidential oath during his inauguration. His eyesight began to deteriorate due to glaucoma since 1985, and worsened by an accident where he was hit by a car which resulted in the loss of a retina. Consequently, he was helped by some trusted assistants who acted as his "eyes". He was also alleged to have a sleep disorder as he was sometimes caught sleeping during important cabinet meetings.

== Published works ==
Year	Indonesian title	English translated title	Publisher
1981	Muslim di Tengah Pergumulan	Muslims in the Midst of Struggle	LKiS
1989	Pribumisasi Islam	The Indigenization of Islam	LKiS
1999	Islamku, Islam Anda, Islam Kita	My Islam, Your Islam, Our Islam	The Wahid Institute
2001	Tuhan Tidak Perlu Dibela	God Does Not Need Defending	LKiS
2006	Pergulatan Negara, Agama, dan Kebudayaan	The Struggle of State, Religion, and Culture	Desantara

== Honours ==
- In 1993, Abdurrahman Wahid received the prestigious Magsaysay Award for his efforts to promote inter-religious relations in Indonesia within a democratic society. The award is often referred to as 'Asia's Nobel Prize.'
- He was conferred honorary doctorates by the Netanya Academic College (Israel), Konkuk and Sun Moon University (South Korea), Sōka University (Japan), Thammasat University (Thailand), Pantheon-Sorbonne University (France), and multiple other universities around the world.
- In 2025, Abdurrahman Wahid was posthumously declared a national hero by Prabowo Subianto in the field of political struggle and Islamic education. The award was given to his beneficiary and wife, Sinta Nuriyah.

=== National honours ===
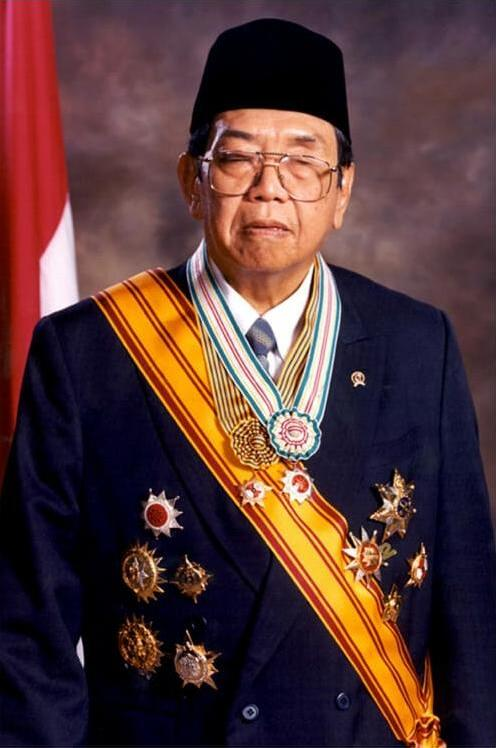
Wahid's official state portrait with his presidential decorations

- Star of the Republic of Indonesia, 1st Class (Indonesian: Bintang Republik Indonesia Adipurna) (23 February 2001)
- Star of Mahaputera, 1st Class (Indonesian: Bintang Mahaputera Adipurna) (23 February 2001)
- Star of Mahaputera, 2nd Class (Indonesian: Bintang Mahaputera Adipradana) (17 August 1998)
- Star of Mahaputera, 3rd Class (Indonesian: Bintang Mahaputera Utama) (13 August 1998)
- Star of Merit, 1st Class (Indonesian: Bintang Jasa Utama) (23 February 2001)
- Star of Culture Parama Dharma (Indonesian: Bintang Budaya Parama Dharma) (23 February 2001)
- Star of Yudha Dharma, 1st Class (Indonesian: Bintang Yudha Dharma Utama) (23 February 2001)
- Star of Kartika Eka Paksi, 1st Class (Indonesian: Bintang Kartika Eka Paksi Utama) (23 February 2001)
- Star of Jalasena, 1st Class (Indonesian: Bintang Jalasena Utama) (23 February 2001)
- Star of Swa Bhuwana Paksa, 1st Class (Indonesian: Bintang Swa Bhuwana Paksa Utama) (23 February 2001)
- Star of Bhayangkara, 1st Class (Indonesian: Bintang Bhayangkara Utama) (23 February 2001)

Political offices
Preceded by B. J. Habibie	President of Indonesia; 20 October 1999 – 23 July 2001	Succeeded by Megawati Sukarnoputri
Party political offices
New political party	National Awakening Party nominee for President of Indonesia; 1999 (won)	Succeeded by None
