= Hasballah M. Saad =

Indonesian politician

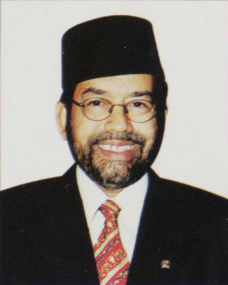

ke-1 State Minister for Human Rights
- In office 26 October 1999 – 23 August 2000
- President: Abdurrahman Wahid
- Succeeded by: Natalius Pigai

Personal details
- Born: July 14, 1948 Pidie, Aceh
- Died: August 23, 2011 (aged 63) Bekasi, West Java
- Spouse: Darmawati
- Education: Syiah Kuala University
- Profession: Politician

Dr. Hasballah M. Saad (14 July 1948 – 23 August 2011) was an Indonesian politician from the National Mandate Party.

Saad was born in Pidie Regency, Aceh. He was a State Minister for Human Rights in United Indonesia Cabinet. At the time of his death Saad was a member of the National Commission on Human Rights and the board secretary for the Indonesian Muslim Intellectuals Association (IMIA). He died at Bekasi.
