= Tanjung Priok massacre =

1984 massacre in Indonesia

- Date: 12 September 1984; 42 years ago
- Location: Tanjung Priok, North Jakarta, Indonesia
- Methods: Shooting
- Result: See Aftermath

Parties
Republic of Indonesia Armed Forces	Muslim residents of Tanjung Priok

Lead figures
(Indonesia) Try Sutrisno (Indonesia) Benny Moerdani	Amir Biki †

Number
Unknown	>1,000

Casualties and losses
None	24 killed and 54 injured (official) >400–700 killed, missing or injured (estimates) (estimates)

The Tanjung Priok massacre was an incident that occurred on 12 September 1984, in the port area of Tanjung Priok, Jakarta, Indonesia. Government reports give a total of 24 killed and 54 injured, while survivors report over 100 killed when military personnel opened fire on protestors.

== Background ==
On 10 September 1984, Sergeant Hermanu, a member of the Community Advisory Non-Commissioned Officer (Bintara Pembina Desa / Babinsa) arrived at As Saadah Mosque in Tanjung Priok, North Jakarta, and told the caretaker, Amir Biki, to remove brochures and banners critical of the government. Biki refused, so Hermanu removed them himself; to do so, he reportedly entered the prayer area of the mosque without removing his shoes (a serious violation of mosque etiquette). In response, local residents, led by mosque caretakers Syarifuddin Rambe and Sofwan Sulaeman, burned his motorcycle and attacked Hermanu while he was talking with another officer. The two then arrested Rambe and Sulaeman, as well as another caretaker, Achmad Sahi, and an unemployed man named Muhamad Noor.

== Incident ==
Two days after the arrest, Islamic cleric Abdul Qodir Jaelani gave a sermon against Pancasila at As Saadah mosque. Afterwards, Biki led a protest to the North Jakarta Military District Command office, where the four prisoners were being held. Along the way, the group's numbers swelled, with estimates ranging between 1,500 and several thousand. The family's store, a pharmacy, was burned to the ground.

Once at the military command, the group unsuccessfully demanded the release of the prisoners. At roughly 11 p.m. local time (UTC+7), the protestors surrounded the military command. Military personnel from the 6th Air Defence Artillery Battalion opened fire on the protestors. Around midnight, eyewitnesses saw Jakarta Regional Military Command chief Try Sutrisno and Armed Forces commander Benny Moerdani supervising the removal of the victims; the corpses were loaded into military trucks and buried in unmarked graves, while the wounded were sent to Gatot Soebroto Military Hospital.

== Aftermath ==
The military reported that the riots had been triggered by a man in a fake military uniform who distributed anti-government pamphlets along with 12 other accomplices; it reported having the man in custody. General Hartono Rekso Dharsono was arrested for allegedly inciting the riots. After a four-month trial, he was convicted; he was eventually released in September 1990, after serving five years in jail.

After the riots, at least 169 civilians were allegedly held without warrant. Some were reportedly tortured. The leaders were arrested and tried for subversion, then given long sentences when convicted. Others, including as Amir Biki, were among those killed.

Initial reports suggested 20 dead. Current official records give a total of 24 killed and 54 injured (including the military), while survivors report over a hundred killed. Tanjung Priok residents estimate a total of 400 killed or missing, while other reports suggest up to 700 victims.

== Investigation ==
With the influx of human rights movements after the fall of Suharto in 1998, several groups were created to advocate for the rights of the victims, including the 12 September 1984 Foundation, the National Solidarity for the 1984 Tanjung Priok Incident (Solidaritas Nasional untuk Peristiwa Tanjung Priok 1984), and the Extended Family for Victims of the Tanjung Priok Incident (Keluarga Besar Korban Peristiwa Tanjung Priok; founded by Biki's widow Dewi Wardah and son Beni). These groups pushed for the People's Representative Council (DPR) and National Commission on Human Rights (Komnas HAM) to further investigate the massacre; inside the DPR, representatives A.M. Fatwa and Abdul Qodir Jaelani, both previously arrested after the massacre, pressed for further investigation. In 1999, Komnas HAM agreed to investigate the incident, forming the Commission for the Investigation and Examination of Human Rights Violations in Tanjung Priok (KP3T).

The KP3T consisted mainly of political figures from the previous regime, including former prosecutor general Djoko Sugianto. The resulting report, released in early June 2000, found that there had been no systematic massacre in the incident. This was not well received by the general public. On 23 June 2000, approximately 300 members of the Islamic Defenders Front (FPI) attacked the headquarters of Komnas HAM while dressed in white Islamic clothing and green scarves. They broke windows with stones and rattan sticks, outnumbering and overwhelming the security forces. The FPI was upset at the commission's report on the massacre and perceived collusion with the military, arguing that it had ignored actions by the military; it insisted that the commission be abolished. Meanwhile, Minister of Law and Human Rights Yusril Ihza Mahendra wrote that Komnas HAM had seemingly applied double standards when investigating the issue; he said that they seemed more reluctant to investigate the Tanjung Priok incident than they had been in investigating the 1999 East Timorese crisis. Crescent Star Party leader Ahmad Sumargono called the verdict a disappointment to Muslims everywhere.

In October 2000, Komnas HAM released another report indicating that 23 individuals, including Sutrisno and Moerdani, should be investigated for their involvement; it called for an ad hoc tribunal to look into the matter further. With President Abdurrahman Wahid calling for further investigation and the impending tribunal, several military officials made contracts of forgiveness (islah) with victims' families; although the islah did not contain admissions of guilt, it did provide for victims to receive a lump sum of Rp. 1.5-2 million (US$200–250). The first islah covered 86 families, as represented by Rambe, while the second covered Biki's family; by 1 March 2001 a number of islah had been made. As a result of the islah, several victims or their families, suggested to Attorney General M.A. Rachman that charges be dropped. However, the investigation continued, wrapping up in July 2003.

Under international pressure, in 2003 the DPR approved the use of the 2000 human rights law to bring perpetrators of the massacre to trial for crimes against humanity; the trial began in September of that year. Those brought to trial included Colonel Sutrisno Mascung, leader of Platoon II of the Air Defense Artillery Battalion at the time, and 13 subordinates. Higher-ranking officials from the time, including Try Sutrisno and Benny Moerdani, were exempted from prosecution, as were former President Suharto and former Justice Minister Ismail Saleh. The prosecution was led by Widodo Supriyadi, and Deputy Speaker of the DPR A.M. Fatwa served as a witness for the prosecution. Several officers prosecuted were convicted, while Sriyanto and Pranowo were acquitted. In 2004, the Attorney General's Office unsuccessfully appealed the acquittals of Sriyanto and Pranowo. The convictions were later overturned by the Supreme Court of Indonesia.

The trial was criticized by human rights groups and activists; German author Fabian Junge argued that "prosecutors deliberately ignored substantial evidence while scare-tactics and bribery were rampant outside court". Approaching the 25th anniversary of the massacre, the victims, aided by the Human Rights Working Group and the Commission for Missing Persons and Victims of Violence, sent a letter to UN Special Rapporteur on the Independence of Judges and Lawyers, Gabriela Carina Knaul de Albuquerque e Silva, imploring her to intervene in the case. The survivors also requested compensation of Rp1.015 billion (US$130,000) from the government for their "pain and loss". Although victims and their representatives asked President Susilo Bambang Yudhoyono to further investigate the issue, as of 2011 the case has not come to closure.
