= Try Sutrisno =

Vice President of Indonesia from 1993 to 1998

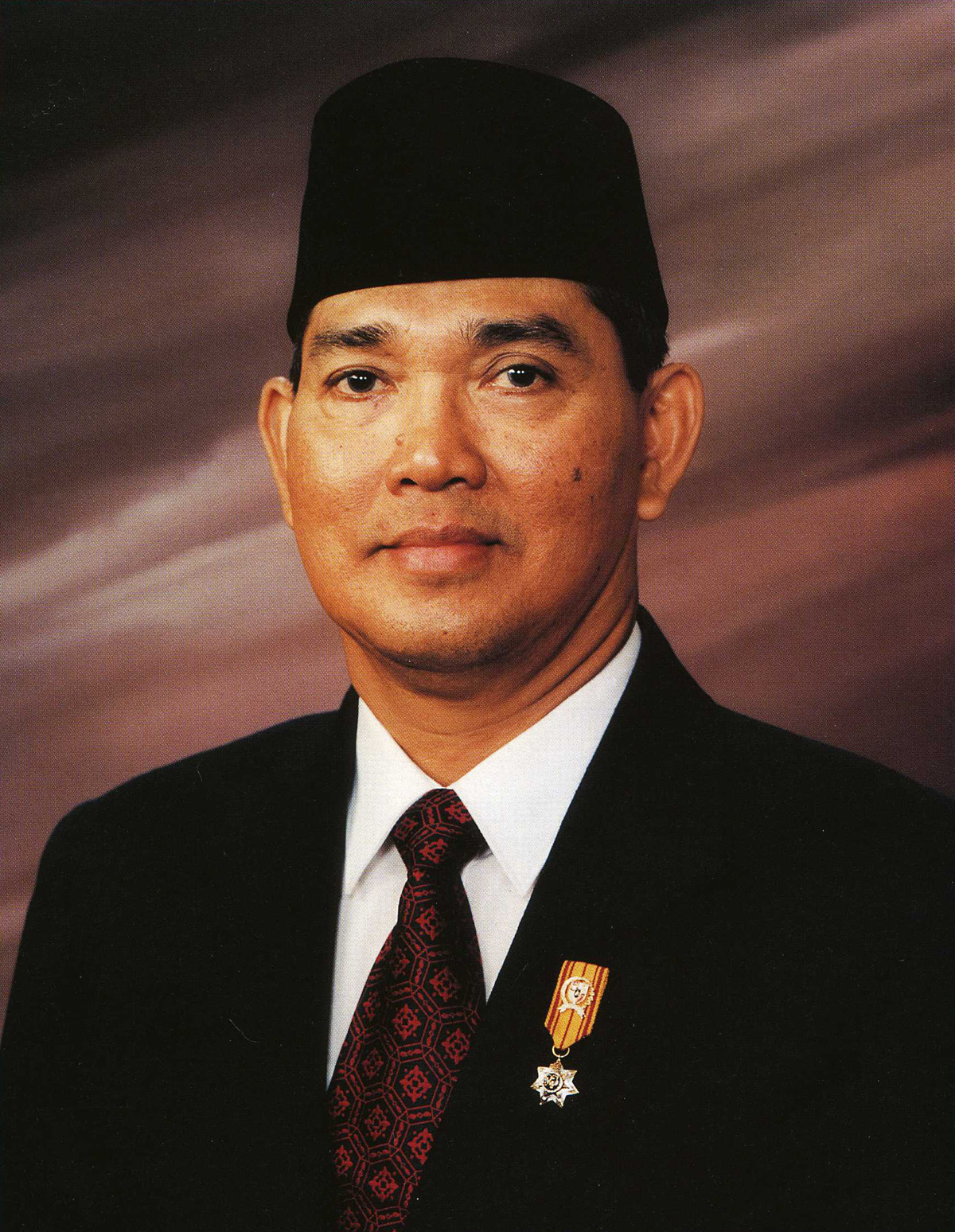
- Official portrait, 1993

6th Vice President of Indonesia
- In office 11 March 1993 – 11 March 1998
- President: Suharto
- Preceded by: Sudharmono
- Succeeded by: B. J. Habibie

9th Commander of the Armed Forces of the Republic of Indonesia
- In office 27 February 1988 – 19 February 1993
- President: Suharto
- Preceded by: General Benny Moerdani
- Succeeded by: General Edi Sudradjat

15th Chief of Staff of the Indonesian Army
- In office 7 June 1986 – 2 February 1988
- President: Suharto
- Preceded by: General Rudini
- Succeeded by: General Edi Sudradjat

General Chairmen of PBSI
- In office 1985–1993
- Preceded by: Ferry Sonneville
- Succeeded by: Soerjadi

Personal details
- Born: 15 November 1935 Soerabaja, Dutch East Indies
- Died: 2 March 2026 (aged 90) Jakarta, Indonesia
- Resting place: Kalibata Heroes' Cemetery
- Party: PKP
- Other political affiliations: Golkar (1993–1999)
- Spouse: Tuti Sutiawati (m. 1961)
- Children: 7
- Education: Army Technical Academy
- Occupation: Politician; army officer

Military service
- Branch: Indonesian Army
- Service years: 1959–1993
- Rank: General
- Unit: Engineers
- Commands: Kodam XVI/Udayana; Kodam IV/Sriwijaya; Kodam V/Jayakarta; Indonesian Armed Forces
- Conflicts: See list: PRRI rebellion; Operation 17 Agustus; West New Guinea dispute; Operation Trikora; Operation Dwikora; Insurgency in East Timor; Insurgency in Aceh
- Service no.: 18438

Try Sutrisno (Indonesian pronunciation: [ˌt̪ri suˈt̪risnɔ]; 15 November 1935 – 2 March 2026) was an Indonesian politician and army general who served as the sixth vice president of Indonesia from 1993 to 1998. Born in Surabaya, Dutch East Indies (now Indonesia), Try graduated from the Army Technical Academy in 1959. During his career, Try held the positions of Chief of Staff of the Indonesian Army (1986–1988) and Commander of the Armed Forces of the Republic of Indonesia (1988–1993).

== Early life and education ==
Try Sutrisno was born on 15 November 1935 in Surabaya, Dutch East Indies (now Indonesia). His father, Subandi, was an ambulance driver, and his mother, Mardiyah, was a housewife. Following the proclamation of Indonesian Independence in 1945, the Indonesian National Revolution began. Try and his family moved from Surabaya to Mojokerto. His father then worked as a medical officer for the Poncowati Army Battalion, forcing Try to stop his schooling and make a living as a cigarette and newspaper seller. At age 13, Try wanted to join the Poncowati Battalion and fight, but no one took him seriously, and he ended up being employed as a courier. Try's duty was to find information on areas occupied by the Dutch Army as well as retrieving medicine for the Indonesian Army. Finally in 1949, the Dutch retreated and recognized Indonesia's independence. Try and his family then returned to Surabaya, where he completed his education in 1956.

After graduating from high school, Try joined the Army Technical Academy (Atekad), now Akmil, in 1956. He passed an entrance examination but then failed the physical examination. Despite this, Major General Djatikoesoemo took an interest in Try and summoned him back. Try participated in a psychological examination in Bandung, West Java, and was then accepted into Atekad as a cadet.

== Military career ==
=== Early military career ===
Try's first military experience was in 1957, when he fought against the PRRI Rebellion. The rebellion was led by a group of separatists in Sumatra wishing to establish an alternative government to that of President Sukarno's. Try completed his military education in 1959, when he graduated from Atekad and was commissioned a second lieutenant in the Indonesian Army.

Try's early experience in the ABRI included stints in Sumatra, Jakarta, and East Java. In 1972, Try was sent to the Army Staff College (Seskoad). In 1974, Try was chosen to be President Suharto's adjutant. Suharto took a liking to Try and from then on, Try's military career would skyrocket.

=== KODAM XVI/Udayana and KODAM IV/Sriwijaya ===
In 1978, Try was appointed to the position of Regional Command Chief of Staff at KODAM XVI/Udayana. A year later, he would become the Regional Commander of KODAM IV/Sriwijaya, where he had started his career. As Regional Commander, Try moved to suppress the crime rate as well as stopping lead smuggling. He also participated in an environmental campaign to return Sumatran elephants to their natural habitats.

=== KODAM V/Jaya and Tanjung Priok Incident ===
In 1982, Try was appointed to the Regional Commander of KODAM V/Jaya and was stationed in Jakarta.

1984 would see the government pass a law which required all organizations, whether it be political or non-political, to adopt the national ideology of Pancasila as the sole guiding principle (Azas Tunggal). It would also see Islamic dissent reach its peak as preachers began teaching against the adoption of Pancasila as the national ideology, what they perceived to be the government's Christianization, the government's family planning program, and the dominance of the Indonesian economy by the Chinese Indonesian population.

On 7 September 1984, Sgt. Hermanu, on an inspection run in North Jakarta, came across a mosque with leaflets which asked for women to wear the hijab. This was a leaflet which encouraged Muslims who read it to defy the government's policy of discouraging women from wearing the hijab. Sergeant Hermanu asked for the leaflets to be taken down but his orders were not followed.

The next day, Hermanu returned and stuck papers washed in dirty water over the leaflets to cover it up. Somehow a rumor began going around that Hermanu had defiled the Mosque by going into the prayer hall without taking his shoes off. This caused a lot of outrage and Hermanu's motorbike was burned. The Army then returned to arrest the 4 youths who burned the motorbike.

Over the next few days there were protests asking for the release of the 4 youths and preachers took advantage of the situation to preach against the Government. Finally on 12 September 1984, the crowd at Tanjung Priok began attacking shops owned by Chinese Indonesians as well as going after the headquarters of the North Jakarta District Military Command (KODIM).

Try, together with ABRI Commander, Benny Moerdani agreed that troops should be deployed to contain the rioters. The riot continued to get worse, according to the soldiers, the mob refused to heed the warning shots and continued charging at them with machetes and sickles. Finally the troops were forced to open fire. The Government claimed that 28 people were killed but the victims continued to insist that around 700 were killed. This episode would continue to haunt Try for the rest of his career.

=== Deputy Army Chief of Staff and Army Chief of Staff ===
Try's career continued to advance. In 1985, he became Deputy Chief of Staff of the Army, before becoming the Chief of Staff of the Army himself in 1986. As Army Chief of Staff, Try started the Badan TWP TNI-AD (Army Board of Compulsory Saving for Housing) to make it easier for Army servicemen to finance their own housing needs.

=== ABRI Commander and Dili Massacre ===
Try finally reached the pinnacle of his military career in 1988, when he was appointed ABRI Commander to replace Moerdani. As ABRI Commander, Try spent a lot of time putting down rebellions all around Indonesia. His immediate target was the separatists in Aceh, which he successfully suppressed by 1992. In 1989, there was the Talangsari incident, in which Try repeated his actions in 1984 by cracking down on Islamist protesters.

In November 1991, in the then Province of East Timor, a group of students attending the funeral of a fellow student who had been shot dead by Indonesian troops took the opportunity to launch protests against the Indonesian occupation. At the funeral procession, students unfurled banners calling for self-determination and independence, displaying pictures of the independence leader Xanana Gusmão. As the procession entered the cemetery, Indonesian troops opened fire. Of the people demonstrating in the cemetery, 271 were killed, 382 wounded, and 250 disappeared.

The incident, known as the Santa Cruz massacre, provoked worldwide condemnation from the international community. Try said two days after the massacre: "The army cannot be underestimated. Finally we had to shoot them. Delinquents like these agitators must be shot, and they will be....". Try was then invited to speak before the People's Representative Council (DPR) to explain himself. Try gave a defense of his decision and maintained that the protesters were provoking the soldiers and that claims that the protests were peaceful was "bullshit".

Try was discharged from his position as ABRI Commander in February 1993.

== Vice presidency (1993–1998) ==
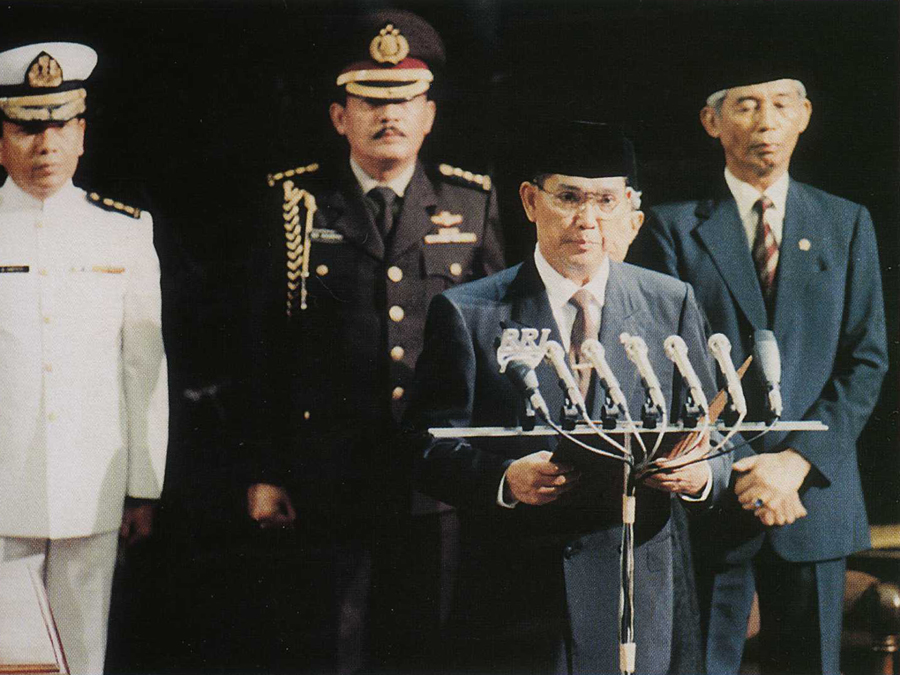
Try Sutrisno being sworn in as vice president, 11 March 1993

In February 1993, the same month that Try was discharged from his position and a month before the People's Consultative Assembly (MPR) was due to meet to elect a new president and Vice President, MPR members from ABRI nominated Try to be the vice president. Technically speaking, MPR faction members were allowed to nominate their candidates for vice president. But the unwritten rule in Suharto's regime had been to wait for the President to nominate his chosen candidate.

Members from the United Development Party and the Indonesian Democratic Party quickly approved of Try's nomination as Golkar struggled in telling its members that Golkar had not nominated Try as vice president. Suharto was reportedly angry that he had been pre-empted by the armed forces but did not want an open dispute with its delegation in the assembly. Suharto finally accepted Try and Golkar tried to play down the pre-emption by saying it had let the other parties and ABRI nominate their vice presidential candidates.

ABRI had gotten their revenge from the 1988 MPR General Session when Suharto chose Sudharmono, someone who the ABRI did not like as the Vice President. Defense Minister Benny Moerdani was determined that ABRI would choose a vice president for Suharto in the 1993 MPR General Session.

It was speculated that had he not been pre-empted, Suharto would have either elected B. J. Habibie as his vice president or re-elected Sudharmono.

Although he had accepted Try as vice president, Suharto's displeasure at having a vice president he did not ask for shone through as ABRI members within the Cabinet were kept to a bare minimum. For Try himself, Suharto showed little regard and did not even consult him in the cabinet formation process.

Another show of disregard came in late 1997 when Suharto had to go to Germany to receive health treatment. Instead of leaving Try to execute Presidential duties, Suharto ordered State Secretary Moerdiono to come to his residence to receive Presidential duties.

== Post-vice presidency (1998–2026) ==
In May 1998, on the eve of Suharto's fall, Try, together with Umar Wirahadikusumah and Sudharmono visited Suharto at his residence to discuss possible options.

In 1998, Try was elected to become the Chairman of the ABRI Veterans' Union (Pepabri). He successfully kept Pepabri united as one under his Chairmanship despite the prevalent mood at the time that each branch of the Armed Forces gets their own veterans' union. Try completed his term in this position in 2003.

Try also served as Party Elder for General Edi Sudrajat's Justice and Unity Party.

In August 2005, Try, together with Abdurrahman Wahid, Megawati Sukarnoputri, Wiranto, and Akbar Tanjung formed a forum called the National Awakening to Unity Movement (Gerakan Nusantara Bangkit Bersatu). This forum criticized Susilo Bambang Yudhoyono's Government for its memorandum of understanding with the Free Aceh Movement (GAM). This was followed in September 2005 with a criticism of Yudhoyono's decision to raise fuel prices.

Try somewhat softened his stance with the Government after a meeting with Vice President Jusuf Kalla in September 2005. Kalla was sent to explain the reasoning behind the policies taken towards GAM and raising fuel prices. At the end of the meeting, Try said that he can understand the Government's position and encouraged the people to back the Government in their decisions.

== Personal life and death ==
Try was married to Tuti Sutiawati, with whom he had seven children: four sons and three daughters.

Try died at the Gatot Soebroto Army Hospital in Central Jakarta, on 2 March 2026, at the age of 90 due to natural causes related to his advanced age, he also suffering a lost appetite and drinking. He had been treated at RSPAD since 16 February. He was buried at the Kalibata Heroes' Cemetery on the same day.

== Honours ==
=== National honours ===
- Star of the Republic of Indonesia, 2nd Class (Indonesian: Bintang Republik Indonesia Adipradana) (17 March 1993)
- Star of Mahaputera, 1st Class (Indonesian: Bintang Mahaputera Adipurna) (17 March 1993)
- Star of Meritorious Service (Indonesian: Bintang Dharma)
- Grand Meritorious Military Order Star, 1 Class (Indonesian: Bintang Yudha Dharma Utama)
- Army Meritorious Service Star, 1 Class (Indonesian: Bintang Kartika Eka Paksi Utama)
- Navy Meritorious Service Star, 1 Class (Indonesian: Bintang Jalasena Utama)
- Air Force Meritorious Service Star, 1 Class (Indonesian: Bintang Swa Bhuana Paksa Utama)
- Star of Bhayangkara, 1st Class (Indonesian: Bintang Bhayangkara Utama)

=== Foreign honours ===
- Austria
  - Grand Decoration of Honour in Gold with Sash of the en:Decoration of Honour for Services to the Republic of Austria (1996)
- Brunei:
  - First Class of the Order of Paduka Keberanian Laila Terbilang (DPKT) – Dato Paduka Seri
- France:
  - Commander of the National Order of the Legion of Honour
- Germany:
  - Grand Cross of the Order of Merit of the Federal Republic of Germany
- Malaysia:
  - Honorary Commander of the Order of the Defender of the Realm – Tan Sri (PMN) (1988)
  - Courageous Commander of the Most Gallant Order of Military Service (PGAT) (1988)
    - Johor
      - Knight Grand Commander of the Order of the Crown of Johor – Dato' Sri Paduka (SPMJ)
- Netherlands
  - Decoration of Merit in gold
- Pakistan
  - Nishan-e-Imtiaz
- Philippines
  - Commander of the Philippine Legion of Honor
- Singapore
  - Recipient of the Darjah Utama Bakti Cemerlang (Tentera) (DUBC) (1991)
- South Korea
  - Tongil Medal of the Order of National Security Merit, 1st Class
- Thailand
  - Knight Grand Cross (First Class) of the Most Exalted Order of the White Elephant (KCE) (1991)
  - Knight Grand Cross (First Class) of the Most Noble Order of the Crown of Thailand (GCCT) (1986)
- United States
  - Commander of the Legion of Merit

== Notes ==
Political offices
Preceded by Sudharmono	Vice President of Indonesia; 11 March 1993 –11 March 1998	Succeeded by B. J. Habibie
Military offices
Preceded by Benny Moerdani	Commander of the Indonesian Armed Forces; 1988–1993	Succeeded by Edi Sudradjat
Preceded by Rudini	Chief of Staff of the Indonesian Army; 1986–1988	Succeeded by Edi Sudradjat
