= Natalius Pigai =

Indonesian politician (born 1975)

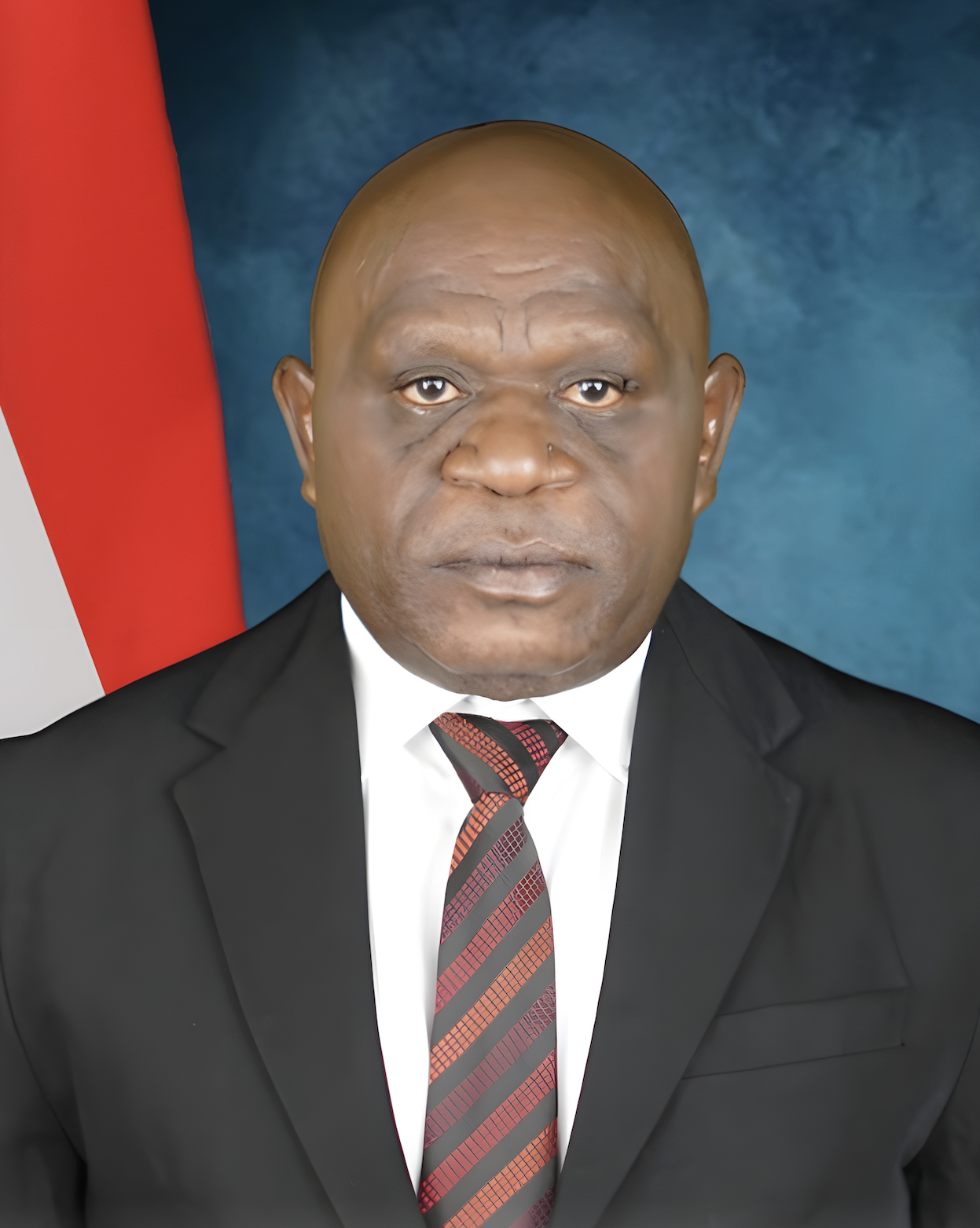

2nd Minister of Human Rights
- Incumbent
- Assumed office 21 October 2024
- President: Prabowo Subianto
- Preceded by: Hasballah M. Saad

Personal details
- Born: 25 December 1975 (age 50) Paniai, Papua, Indonesia
- Party: Gerindra Party
- Education: Yogyakarta College of Village Community Development

Natalius Pigai (born 25 December 1975) is an Indonesian politician and activist who has been serving as the Minister of Human Rights in President Prabowo Subianto's Red and White Cabinet since 2024. From 2012 to 2017, he was a member of the National Commission on Human Rights. His experience in the Transmigration Ministry began as a parking attendant, and he became an honorary officer in the ministry. He started his career after becoming a civil servant and held echelon positions and the leadership of the National Human Rights Commission until he became the Minister of Justice on 24 October 2024. During a meeting with the House of Representative on 15 September 2025, he claimed that he was a member of the Gerindra Party, albeit not as a card-carrying member.

== Early life ==
Natalius Pigai was born on the 25th of December 1975 in Enarotali, Paniai, Irian Jaya (now Central Papua). He attended senior high school at SMA Negeri 1 Wamena and graduated in 1994.

After completing his secondary education, he continued his studies at the Yogyakarta College of Village Community Development (STPMD "APMD"), earning a Bachelor of Government Science (S.I.P.) degree in 1999.

During his time as researcher of Department of Manpower and Transmigration, he also completed various courses in statistics from the University of Indonesia (2004), researcher functionaries' education from Indonesian Institute of Sciences (2005), and leadership from the National Institute of Public Administration (2010-2011)

== Career ==
Natalius Pigai's career began with his involvement in various organizations during his time in college at Yogyakarta. He was active in the student movement of the 1998 Reformation struggle. During his time in college, he was the Chairman of Irian Jaya Students Association in Yogyakarta and Head of Research and Development of Indonesian Catholic Students Union from 1997 to 1999. After graduation, he joined various NGOs as social researcher with focus of ethnical affairs of native Papuans, Dayaks, Sasaks, and Acehnese people from 1998 to 2002.

Pigai began his career in the government as employee of the Department of Manpower and Transmigration. He started his job as Special Staff to the Minister of Manpower and Transmigration from 1999 to 2004. He claimed that he was tasked as parking clerk and courier of the minister when he began his carrier. His experience in this ministry continued with his role as a Researcher for Internal and International Migration at the Department of Manpower and Transmigration from 2005 to 2012, with brief assignment to the Indonesian Institute of Sciences in 2005.

He was hired by TVRI as moderator of interactive dialog programs concerning the politics and governance from 2006 to 2008.

During reconstruction after Aceh Tsunami, he was assigned as consultant to the Deputy of Monitoring, Aceh-Nias Rehabilitation and Reconstruction Agency until 2009. He also assigned as member of assistance team to the Directorate General of Regional Autonomy, Ministry of Home Affairs until 2012.

He was elected as one of eleven members of the National Commission on Human Rights (Komnas HAM) for the 2012–2017 period.

On October 21, 2024, Natalius Pigai was appointed the Minister of Human Rights in the Red and White Cabinet.

== Controversies ==
Pigai drew public attention after he requested a budget increase for the Ministry of Human Rights of IDR 60 billion to IDR 20 trillion. This was deemed unreasonable due to the significant budget increase. Yasonna Laoly, a member of the Commission XIII of the House of Representatives (DPR), stated that the budget increase should be more realistic and reasonable.
