= Ministry of Human Rights (Indonesia) =

Government ministry of Indonesia

- Kementerian Hak Asasi Manusia
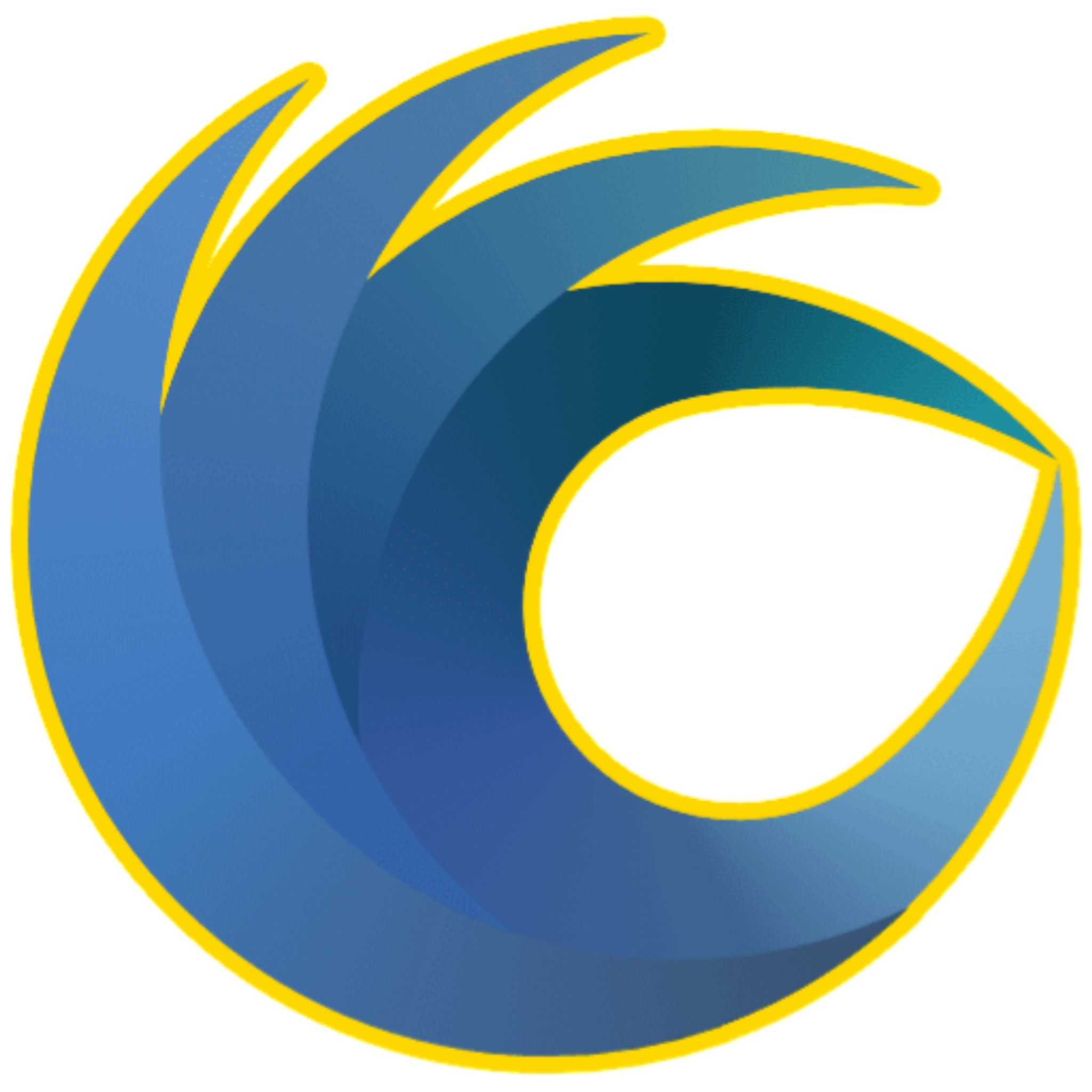

Ministry overview
- Formed: 21 October 2024
- Preceding Ministry: Directorate General VI (Human Rights), Ministry of Law and Human Rights
- Jurisdiction: Government of Indonesia
- Headquarters: Jalan H.R. Rasuna Said Kav. 6-7 Jakarta Selatan 12940 Jakarta, Indonesia
- Ministers responsible: Natalius Pigai, Minister for Human Rights; Mugiyanto, Deputy Minister for Human Rights
- Parent department: Coordinating Ministry for Legal, Human Rights, Immigration, and Correction
- Website: kemenham.go.id

The Ministry of Human Rights (Indonesian: Kementerian Hak Asasi Manusia) is an Indonesian ministry that administers and develops human rights in Indonesia. The ministry has been led by Natalius Pigai since 21 October 2024.

The ministry is distinct from the National Commission on Human Rights. While the commission worked in the supervision, protection, and promotion of human rights in Indonesia, this ministry works in human rights development through formulation and implementation of human rights policies.

== History ==
The Ministry of Human Rights was originally established in 1999 by the fourth President, Abdurrahman Wahid, under the name State Ministry for Human Rights Affairs.

In 2000, the human rights portfolio was merged into the Department of Justice and Human Rights, holding the status of a directorate general. Subsequently, in 2004, the portfolio remained within the same institution but was renamed the Department of Law and Human Rights, and later the Ministry of Law and Human Rights in 2009.

Following his inauguration after winning the 2024 election, President Prabowo Subianto established a Ministry of Human Rights separate from the Ministry of Law. In the Red and White Cabinet, the Ministry of Law and Human Rights was split into three ministries: the Ministry of Law, the Ministry of Human Rights, and the Ministry of Immigration and Correctional Affairs. All three operate under the coordination of the Coordinating Ministry for Law, Human Rights, Immigration, and Correctional Affairs.

== List of Ministers ==
Since October 29, 1999, two individuals have served as the Minister of Human Rights of Indonesia. The incumbent is Natalius Pigai.

== Organization ==
Based on Presidential Decree No. 156/2024 and Ministry of Law Decree No. 1/2024 and 2/2025, the Ministry of Law is organized into the following:

- Office of the Minister for Human Rights
- Office of the Deputy Minister for Human Rights
- General Secretariat
  - Bureau of Planning and Collaboration
  - Bureau of Human Resources, Law, Organization, and Administration
  - Bureau of Finance and State-owned Properties
  - Bureau of General Affairs, Protocol, and Public Relations
- Directorate General for Human Rights Instruments and Strengthening (Directorate General I)
  - Directorate General for Human Rights Instruments and Strengthening Secretariat
    - Sub-directorate of Program and Reporting
    - Sub-directorate of General Affairs and Human Resources
  - Directorate of Formulation and Evaluation of Human Rights Instruments
    - Sub-directorate of Human Rights Instruments in Law, Politics, and Defense Affairs
    - Sub-directorate of Human Rights Instruments in Economy, Social, and Cultural Affairs
  - Directorate of Human Rights Capacity Strengthening for State Apparatuses
    - Sub-directorate of System and Strategy for Human Rights Capacity Strengthening for State Apparatuses
  - Directorate of Human Rights Capacity Strengthening for the Society, Community, and Businesspersons
    - Sub-directorate of System and Strategy for Human Rights Capacity Strengthening for the Society, Community, and Businesspersons
- Directorate General for Human Rights Services and Compliance (Directorate General II)
  - Directorate General for Human Rights Services and Compliance Secretariat
    - Sub-directorate of Program and Reporting
    - Sub-directorate of General Affairs and Human Resources
  - Directorate of Human Rights Services
    - Sub-directorate of Human Rights Reporting Management
    - Sub-directorate of Human Rights Defense
  - Directorate of Human Rights Compliance in Government Institutions
    - Sub-directorate of Compliance Management and Reporting of Human Rights Compliance in Government Institutions
  - Directorate of Human Rights Compliance in the Society, Community, and Businesspersons
    - Sub-directorate of Compliance Management and Reporting of Human Rights Compliance in the Society, Community, and Businesspersons
- General Inspectorate
  - General Inspectorate Secretariat
    - Division of Program and Reporting
    - Division of General Affairs and Human Resources
  - Regional Inspectorate I
  - Regional Inspectorate II
- Board of Experts
  - Senior Expert to the Minister on Bureaucracy and Legal Reform Strengthening
  - Senior Expert to the Minister on Civilian, Politics, Social, and Cultural Affairs
- Centers
  - Center for Human Rights Human Resource Development
  - Center for Human Rights Data and Information
- Regional Offices
  - Aceh Office for Human Rights, Banda Aceh
  - North Sumatera Office for Human Rights, Medan (serving North Sumatera and Riau Islands)
  - West Sumatera Office for Human Rights, Padang (serving West Sumatera and Riau)
  - Jambi Office for Human Rights, Jambi
  - Bangka Belitung Islands Office for Human Rights, Pangkal Pinang
  - South Sumatera Office for Human Rights, Palembang (serving South Sumatera and Bengkulu)
  - Lampung Office for Human Rights, Bandar Lampung
  - Banten Office for Human Rights, Banten
  - West Java Office for Human Rights, Bandung
  - Jakarta Office for Human Rights, Jakarta
  - Central Java Office for Human Rights, Semarang (serving Central Java and Yogyakarta)
  - East Java Office for Human Rights, Surabaya
  - East Nusa Tenggara Office for Human Rights, Kupang (serving East Nusa Tenggara, West Nusa Tenggara, and Bali)
  - Central Kalimantan Office for Human Rights, Palangkaraya (serving Central Kalimantan and West Kalimantan)
  - East Kalimantan Office for Human Rights, Samarinda (serving East Kalimantan, North Kalimantan, and Nusantara)
  - South Kalimantan Office for Human Rights, Banjarmasin
  - West Sulawesi Office for Human Rights, Mamuju
  - Central Sulawesi Office for Human Rights, Palu (serving Central Sulawesi, North Sulawesi, and Gorontalo)
  - South Sulawesi Office for Human Rights, Makassar (serving South Sulawesi and Southeast Sulawesi)
  - West Papua Office for Human Rights, Manokwari (serving West Papua, Papua, Southwest Papua, Highland Papua, Central Papua, South Papua, Maluku, and North Maluku)
