= National Commission on Human Rights =

National human rights institution

- Komisi Nasional Hak Asasi Manusia
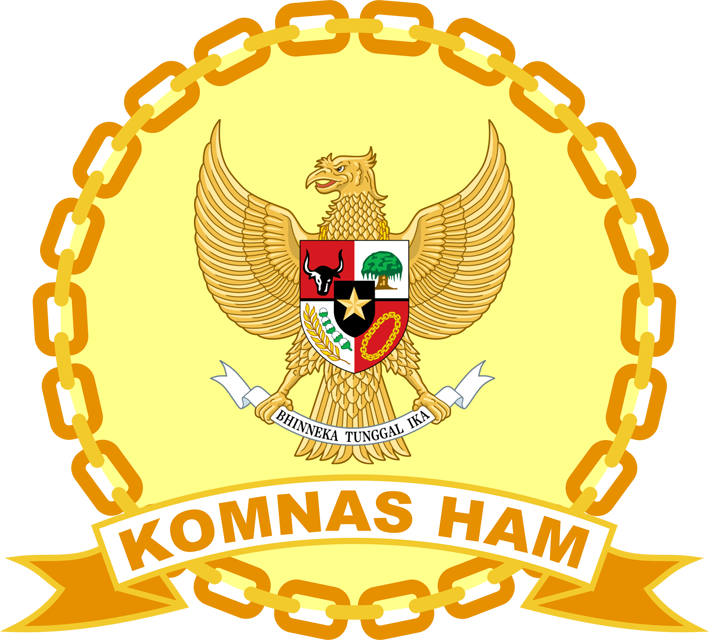

Agency overview
- Formed: June 7, 1993; 33 years ago
- Jurisdiction: Government of Indonesia
- Headquarters: Jl. Latuharhary 4B, Menteng, Central Jakarta, Jakarta, Indonesia
- Website: www.komnasham.go.id

The National Commission on Human Rights (Indonesian: Komisi Nasional Hak Asasi Manusia, Komnas HAM) is the national human rights institution (NHRI) of Indonesia. As with other NHRIs, its principal functions are the protection and promotion of human rights.

== History ==
The commission was established by the Suharto regime through a Presidential Decree No. 50 of 1993, shortly after United Nations Commission on Human Rights resolution 1993/97 expressed grave concern over allegations of serious human rights violations by the government of Indonesia.

Komnas HAM's jurisdiction included human rights issues in East Timor until the territory voted to secede from Indonesia. It also investigated unresolved cases such as the murder of Marsinah.

After the 1998 downfall of Suharto, the 1993 decree was superseded by Law No. 39 of 1999 which set out the functions of Komnas HAM, and provided for its funding, membership and powers.

Following calls for Komnas HAM to inquire into the 1984 Tanjung Priok massacre, the Human Rights Law of 2000 (No. 26) gave it the power to investigate alleged human rights abuses, if necessary by forming ad hoc investigative teams bringing in outside expertise. It issued two reports on the 1984 killings. In 2008, it reopened an investigation into the 1998 Trisakti shootings in which four students were shot dead by state security forces at a demonstration demanding President Suharto's resignation.

In 2008, Law No. 40 gave Komnas HAM additional responsibilities in the prevention of racial and ethnic discrimination.

In all of its work, Komnas HAM is required to have regard to human rights defined in national legislation and in international instruments to which Indonesia is party.

== International status ==
In 2000, with support from the Office of the United Nations High Commissioner for Human Rights, Komnas HAM secured 'A-status' accreditation from the peer review process of the International Coordinating Committee of NHRIs (ICC), giving it enhanced access to the United Nations human rights bodies. That status was subjected to reviewed by the ICC in March 2007, and reaffirmed. The Commission is a member of the Asia Pacific Forum, one of the four regional groupings in the ICC.

== See also ==
- Human rights in Indonesia
- National human rights institutions
- Ministry of Human Rights (Indonesia)
- National Commission on Violence against Women (Indonesia)
- Paris Principles
