= List of longest-serving ministers in Indonesia =

The list of longest-serving ministers in Indonesia is a list of the longest serving ministers in the cabinets of Indonesia, which have served ten years or longer, sorted by length.

All ministers who had served between the Third Development Cabinet until the Seventh Development Cabinet were mandatorily seated by Suharto as members of the advisory council of the Golkar party. Bold minister name means the minister is currently serving.

#	Image	Name	Duration	Post	Cabinet	Party	Length of tenure	Notes
1		Emil Salim	11 September 1971 – 17 March 1993	Minister of Administrative and Bureaucratic Reform; Minister of Transportation; State Minister of Population and Environment Affairs	Development I; Development II; Development III; Development IV; Development V	Golkar	21 years, 180 days	
2		Radius Prawiro	17 March 1965 – 25 July 1966; 28 March 1973 – 17 March 1993	Deputy Minister of Financial Auditors; Department Minister of Central Bank; Minister of Trade; Minister of Finance; Coordinating Minister for Economy, Finance, Industry and Development Supervision	Dwikora I; Dwikora II; Development II; Development III; Development IV; Development V	Golkar	21 years, 108 days	
3		Johannes Baptista Sumarlin	28 March 1973 – 17 March 1993	State Minister of State Apparatus Control; Minister of National Development Planning; Minister of Finance	Development II; Development III; Development IV; Development V	Golkar	19 years, 348 days	
4		Bacharuddin Jusuf Habibie	29 March 1978 – 11 March 1998	State Minister of Research and Technology	Development III; Development IV; Development V; Development VI	Golkar	19 years, 345 days	
5		Ali Wardhana	6 June 1968 – 23 March 1988	Minister of Finance; Coordinating Minister for Economic, Financial, Industrial and Development Supervision	Development I; Development II; Development III; Development IV	Golkar	19 years, 292 days	
6		Mohammad Jusuf	27 August 1964 – 19 March 1983	Minister of Industry; Minister of Trade; Minister of Defence	Dwikora I; Dwikora II; Dwikora III; Ampera I; Ampera II; Development I; Development II; Development III	Golkar	18 years, 204 days	
7		Hamengkubuwono IX	2 October 1946 – 27 April 1951; 3 April 1952 – 2 June 1953; 6 March 1962 – 8 March 1973	State Minister; Minister of Defence; Minister/Chairman of Audit Board of Indonesia; Deputy Prime Minister; Coordinating Minister for Economic and Financial Affairs of Indonesia	Sjahrir III; Amir Sjarifuddin I; Amir Sjarifuddin II; Hatta I; Hatta II; RUSI; Natsir; Wilopo; Working III; Working IV; Dwikora I; Dwikora II; Dwikora III; Ampera I; Ampera II; Development I	Independent	16 years, 269 days	
8		Hartarto Sastrosoenarto	19 March 1983 – 20 October 1999	Minister of Industry; Coordinating Minister for Production and Distribution Affairs; Minister of Administrative and Bureaucratic Reform	Development IV; Development V; Development VI; Development VII; Development Reform	Golkar	16 years, 215 days	
9		Subroto	11 September 1971 – 21 March 1988	Minister of Manpower, Transmigration and Cooperatives; Minister of Mines and Energy	Development I; Development II; Development III; Development IV	Golkar	16 years, 192 days	
10		Johannes Leimena	13 July 1947 – 30 July 1953; 12 August 1955 – 24 April 1956; 9 April 1957 – 25 July 1966	Minister of Health; Minister of Social Affairs; State Minister; Deputy Prime Minister; Coordinating Minister for Distribution Affairs	List: Amir Sjarifuddin I; Amir Sjarifuddin II; Hatta I; Hatta II; RUSI; Natsir; Sukiman; Wilopo; Burhanuddin Harahap; Djuanda; Working I; Working II; Working III; Working IV; Dwikora I; Dwikora II; Dwikora III	Parkindo	16 years, 15 days	
11		Sudharmono	8 April 1972 – 21 March 1988	State Secretary	Development I; Development II; Development III; Development IV	Golkar	15 years, 344 days	
12		Sri Mulyani	21 October 2004 – 20 May 2010; 27 July 2016 – 8 September 2025	State Minister of National Development Planning; Finance Minister	United Indonesia; United Indonesia II; Working (2014–19); Onward Indonesia; Red and White	Independent	14 years, 253 days	
13		Harmoko	19 March 1983 – 1 October 1997	Minister of Information; Minister of Special Affairs	Development IV; Development V; Development VI	Golkar	14 years, 193 days	
14		Mochtar Kusumaatmadja	22 January 1974 – 21 March 1988	Minister of Foreign Affairs; Minister of Justice	Development II; Development III; Development IV	Golkar	14 years, 59 days	
15		Purnomo Yusgiantoro	23 August 2000 – 20 October 2014	Minister of Energy and Mineral Resources; Minister of Defence	National Unity; Mutual Assistance; United Indonesia I; United Indonesia II	Independent	14 years, 58 days	
16		Gerrit Augustinus Siwabessy	27 August 1964 – 29 March 1978	Minister of Atomic Energy; Minister of Health	Dwikora I; Dwikora II; Dwikora III; Ampera I; Ampera II; Development I; Development II	Independent	13 years, 213 days	
17		Sutami	27 August 1964 – 29 March 1978	State Minister; Minister of Public Works	Dwikora I; Dwikora II; Dwikora III; Ampera I; Ampera II; Development I; Development II	Independent	13 years, 212 days	
18		Djuanda Kartawidjaja	2 October 1946 – 14 December 1949; 20 December 1949 – 30 July 1953; 9 April 1957 – 7 November 1963	Minister of Transportation; State Minister; Minister of Public Works; Minister of Defence; Prime Minister; Minister of Finance; First Minister	Sjahrir III; Amir Sjarifuddin I; Amir Sjarifuddin II; Hatta I; Hatta II; RUSI; Natsir; Sukiman; Wilopo; Djuanda; Working I; Working II; Working III	Independent	13 years, 142 days	
19		Amirmachmud	28 January 1969 – 1 October 1982	Minister of Home Affairs	Development I; Development II; Development III	Golkar	13 years, 247 days	
20		Thojib Hadiwidjaja	6 March 1962 – 27 August 1964; 14 October 1967 – 29 March 1978	Minister of Higher Education & Science; Minister of Plantations; Minister of Agriculture	Working III; Working IV; Ampera II; Development I; Development II	Independent	12 years, 337 days	
21		Hatta Rajasa	10 August 2001 – 29 September 2004; 20 October 2004 – 13 May 2014	State Minister of Research and Technology; Minister of Transportation; State Secretary; Coordinating Minister for Economic Affairs	Mutual Assistance; United Indonesia I; United Indonesia II	PAN	12 years, 252 days	
22		Sofyan Djalil	21 October 2004 – 20 October 2009; 27 October 2014 – 15 June 2022	Minister of Communications and Informatics; State Minister of State Owned Enterprises; Coordinating Minister for Economic Affairs; Minister of National Development Planning; Minister of Agriculture and Land Planning	First United Indonesia; Working (2014–19); Onward Indonesia	Independent	12 years, 230 days	
23		Adam Malik	13 November 1963 – 27 August 1964; 18 March 1966 – 1 October 1977	Minister of Trade; Minister of Foreign Affairs	Working IV; Dwikora II; Dwikora III; Ampera I; Ampera II; Development I; Development II	Murba (until 1967); Golkar	12 years, 118 days	
24		Pratikno	27 October 2014 – 1 October 2026	Secretary of State; Coordinating Minister for Human Development and Cultural Affairs	Working; Onward Indonesia; Red and White	Independent	11 years, 339 days	
25		Ali Alatas	21 March 1988 – 20 October 1999	Minister of Foreign Affairs	Development V; Development VI; Development VII; Development Reform	Golkar	11 years, 213 days	
26		Sarwono Kusumaatmadja	21 March 1988 – 17 March 1998; 29 October 1999 – 1 June 2001	Minister of Administrative and Bureaucratic Reform; Minister of Environment; Minister of Marine Exploration	Development V; Development VI; National Unity	Golkar	11 years, 210 days	
27		Ginandjar Kartasasmita	21 March 1988 – 27 September 1999	Minister of Mines and Energy; State Minister for National Development Planning; Coordinating Minister for Economic, Financial and Industrial Affairs of Indonesia	Development V; Development VI; Development VII; Development Reform	Golkar	11 years, 190 days	
28		Sadjarwo Djarwonagoro	21 January 1950 – 6 September 1950; 30 July 1953 – 12 August 1955; 9 April 1957 – 22 February 1966	Minister of Agriculture; Minister of Agrarian Affairs	Halim; Ali Sastroamidjojo I; Djuanda; Working I; Working II; Working III; Working IV; Dwikora I	BTI	11 years, 195 days	
29		Maraden Panggabean	9 September 1971 – 19 March 1983	Minister of Defence; Coordinating Minister for Politics, Law and Security	Development I; Development II; Development III	Golkar	11 years, 184 days	
29		Widjojo Nitisastro	9 September 1971 – 19 March 1983	Minister of National Development Planning	Development I; Development II; Development III	Golkar	11 years, 184 days	
31		Akbar Tandjung	21 March 1988 – 10 May 1999	State Minister of Youth and Sports; Minister of Public Housing; State Secretary	Development V; Development VI; Development VII; Development Reform	Golkar	11 years, 50 days	
32		Sumitro Djojohadikusumo	7 September 1950 – 21 March 1951; 3 April 1952 – 30 July 1953; 12 August 1955 – 24 March 1956; 6 June 1968 – 29 March 1978	Minister of Trade and Industry; Minister of Finance; Minister of Research of Indonesia	Natsir; Wilopo; Burhanuddin Harahap; Development I; Development II	PSI (until 1960); Independent	10 years, 281 days	
33		Idham Chalid	26 March 1956 – 10 July 1959; 24 February 1966 – 28 March 1973	Deputy Prime Minister; Minister of People's Welfare	Ali Sastroamidjojo II; Djuanda; Ampera I; Ampera II; Development I	NU (until 1973); PPP	10 years, 138 days	
34		Airlangga Hartarto	27 July 2016 – present	Minister of Industry; Coordinating Minister for Economic Affairs	Working; Onward Indonesia; Red and White	Golkar	10 years, 84 days (Note: As of 19 October 2026)	
35		Luhut Binsar Pandjaitan	28 August 2000 – 23 July 2001; 12 August 2015 – 20 October 2024	Minister of Industry and Trade; Coordinating Minister of Political, Legal and Security Affairs; Coordinating Minister of Maritime and Investment Affairs (Note: The position was named Coordinating Minister of Maritime (2016–2019))	National Unity; Working; Onward Indonesia	Golkar	10 years, 33 days	
36		Soedibjo	1 August 1953 – 14 September 1953; 12 August 1955 – 18 January 1956; 24 March 1956 – 27 March 1966	State Minister for National Prosperity; Minister of Social Affairs; Minister of Information; Junior Minister for People Mobilization; Minister / Secretary General of the National Front; State Minister, seconded to the Presidium	Ali Sastroamidjojo I; Burhanuddin Harahap; Ali Sastroamidjojo II; Djuanda; Working I; Working II; Working III; Working IV; Dwikora I; Dwikora II	PSII	10 years, 22 days	
