= Development Cabinet =

Development Cabinet may refer to the following cabinets of the Indonesian government:

- First Development Cabinet
- Second Development Cabinet
- Third Development Cabinet
- Fourth Development Cabinet
- Fifth Development Cabinet
- Sixth Development Cabinet
- Seventh Development Cabinet
