= Third Development Cabinet =

Third Development Cabinet Kabinet Pembangunan III
- 30th Cabinet of Indonesia
- 1978–1983
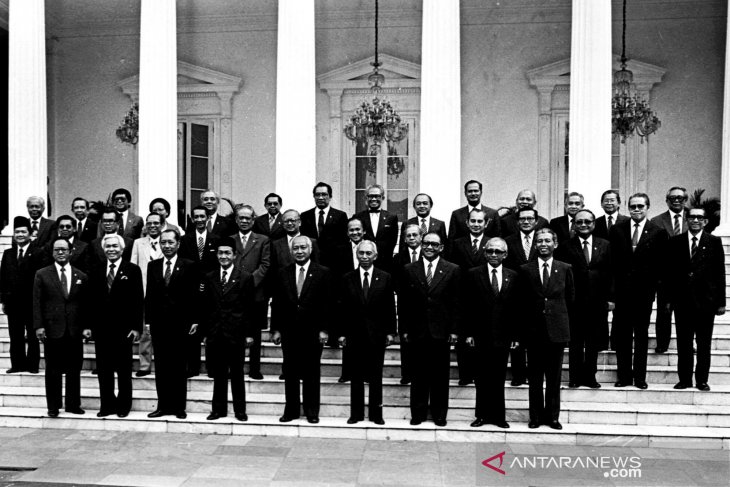
- Date formed: 31 March 1978
- Date dissolved: 16 March 1983

People and organisations
- President: Suharto
- No. of ministers: 24 ministers
- Member parties: Functional Groups; Armed Forces; Indonesian Democratic Party; United Development Party
- Status in legislature: Coalition

History
- Predecessor: Development II Cabinet
- Successor: Development IV Cabinet

The Third Development Cabinet (Indonesian: Kabinet Pembangunan III) is the name of the cabinet of the Indonesian government led by President Suharto and Vice President Adam Malik. The cabinet was announced on 29 March 1978 and served from 31 March 1978 until 16 March 1983.

The Sapta Krida (tasks) of the Third Development Cabinet are as follows:

- The establishment of an environment and a situation which will ensure social justice for the people through the equity of Development and its results.
- The accomplishment of a high economic growth.
- The consolidation of an ever stronger national stability.
- The creation of a clean and legitimate state apparatus.
- The continuing development of a stronger national unity and oneness with the Guide to Learn and Apply Pancasila (P4) as its foundation.
- The holding of a direct, universal, free, and secret legislative election with the aim of strengthening Pancasila democracy.
- Further developing a free and active foreign policy for the sake of national interest and with the aim of strengthening national resilience.

== Cabinet leaders ==
President	Vice President
Suharto	Adam Malik

== Cabinet members ==
=== Ministers ===
The following are the ministers of the Third Development Cabinet.

Num.	Portfolio	Photo	Minister	Took office	Left office
Coordinating Ministers
1	Coordinating Minister of Political and Security Affairs		Maraden Panggabean	31 March 1978	16 March 1983
2	Coordinating Minister of Economics, Finance, and Industry/Chairman of the National Development Planning Body (BAPPENAS)		Widjojo Nitisastro	31 March 1978	16 March 1983
3	Coordinating Minister of People's Welfare		Surono Reksodimedjo	31 March 1978	16 March 1983
Departmental Ministers
4	Minister of Home Affairs		Amirmachmud (Note: Amirmachmud was appointed as Chairman of the MPR/DPR RI.)	31 March 1978	1 October 1982
4	Minister of Home Affairs		Sudharmono (ad-interim)	1 October 1982	16 March 1983
5	Minister of Foreign Affairs		Mochtar Kusumaatmadja	31 March 1978	16 March 1983
6	Minister of Defense and Security/Commander of ABRI		M. Jusuf	31 March 1978	16 March 1983
7	Minister of Justice		Moedjono (Note: Moedjono was appointed Chief Justice of the Supreme Court of Indonesia.)	31 March 1978	18 February 1981
7	Minister of Justice		Ali Said	18 February 1981	16 March 1983
8	Minister of Information		Ali Moertopo	31 March 1978	16 March 1983
9	Minister of Finance		Ali Wardhana	31 March 1978	16 March 1983
10	Minister of Trade and Cooperatives		Radius Prawiro	31 March 1978	16 March 1983
11	Minister of Agriculture		Soedarsono Hadisapoetro	31 March 1978	16 March 1983
12	Minister of Industry		A.R. Soehoed	31 March 1978	16 March 1983
13	Minister of Mines and Energy		Subroto	31 March 1978	16 March 1983
14	Minister of Public Works		Purnomosidi Hadjisarosa	31 March 1978	16 March 1983
15	Minister of Transportation		Rusmin Nurjadin	31 March 1978	16 March 1983
16	Minister of Education and Culture		Daoed Joesoef	31 March 1978	16 March 1983
17	Minister of Health		Suwardjono Surjaningrat	31 March 1978	16 March 1983
18	Minister of Religious Affairs		Alamsyah Ratu Perwiranegara	31 March 1978	16 March 1983
19	Minister of Social Affairs		Sapardjo	31 March 1978	16 March 1983
20	Minister of Manpower and Transmigration		Harun Zain	31 March 1978	16 March 1983
State Ministers
21	State Minister of State Apparatus Control		J. B. Sumarlin	31 March 1978	16 March 1983
22	State Minister of Development Supervision and Environment		Emil Salim	31 March 1978	16 March 1983
23	State Minister of Research and Technology		B. J. Habibie	31 March 1978	16 March 1983
24	State Minister/State Secretary		Sudharmono	31 March 1978	16 March 1983

=== Junior ministers ===
On 22 April 1978, President Soeharto appointed six junior ministers who served as deputy ministers. They were:

- The Junior Minister for Public Housing Affairs will be assigned to the Minister of Public Works.
- The Junior Minister for Cooperative Affairs will be assigned to the Minister of Trade and Cooperatives.
- The Junior Minister for Youth Affairs will be assigned to the Minister of Education and Culture.
- The Junior Minister for Food Production Affairs will be assigned to the Minister of Agriculture.
- The Junior Minister for the Role of Women Affairs will be assigned to the Coordinating Minister of People's Welfare.
- The Junior Minister for Transmigration Affairs will be assigned to the Minister of Manpower and Transmigration.

Num.	Portfolio	Photo	Minister	Took office	Left office
1	Junior Minister for Public Housing Affairs		Cosmas Batubara	22 April 1978	16 March 1983
2	Junior Minister for Cooperative Affairs		Bustanil Arifin	22 April 1978	16 March 1983
3	Junior Minister for Youth Affairs		Abdul Gafur	22 April 1978	16 March 1983
4	Junior Minister for Food Production Affairs		Achmad Affandi	22 April 1978	16 March 1983
5	Junior Minister for the Role of Women Affairs		Lasiyah Soetanto	22 April 1978	16 March 1983
6	Junior Minister for Transmigration Affairs		Martono	22 April 1978	16 Maret 1983

=== Officials with ministerial rank ===
The following are ministerial-level officials in the Third Development Cabinet.

Num.	Portfolio	Photo	Minister	Took office	Left office
1	Attorney General		Ali Said	4 April 1973	18 February 1981
1	Attorney General		Ismail Saleh	18 February 1981	30 May 1984
2	Governor of the Central Bank		Rachmat Saleh	5 April 1978	16 March 1983
3	Commander of the Operational Command for the Restoration of Security and Order		Sudomo	5 April 1978	16 March 1983
