= Second Development Cabinet =

Second Development Cabinet Kabinet Pembangunan II
- 29th Cabinet of Indonesia
- 1973–1978
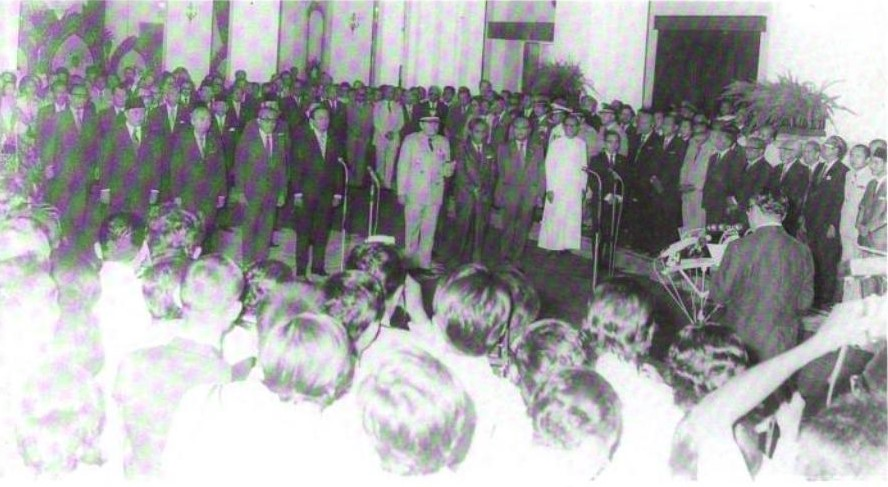
- Date formed: 28 March 1973
- Date dissolved: 29 March 1978

People and organisations
- President: Suharto
- No. of ministers: 22 ministers
- Member parties: Functional Groups; Armed Forces; Indonesian Democratic Party; United Development Party
- Status in legislature: Coalition

History
- Predecessor: Development I Cabinet
- Successor: Development III Cabinet

The Second Development Cabinet (Indonesian: Kabinet Pembangunan II) is the name of the cabinet of the Indonesian government led by President Suharto and Vice President Hamengkubuwono IX. The cabinet was announced on 27 March 1973 and served from 28 March 1973 until 29 March 1978.

The Sapta Krida (tasks) of Second Development Cabinet are as follows:

- Maintaining and enhancing political stability.
- Maintaining and enhancing security and order stability.
- Maintaining and enhancing economic stability.
- Completing Repelita I and then preparing and implementing Repelita II.
- Improving people's welfare.
- Improving the order and utilization of apparatus.
- Holding general elections at the end of 1977.

During this cabinet period, The Second Pelita began (1 April 1974 – 31 March 1979). The targets to be achieved at this time are food, clothing, housing, facilities and infrastructure, welfare for the people, and expanding employment opportunities. The Second Pelita succeeded in increasing the economic growth of an average population of 7% a year. Improvements in terms of irrigation. There was also an increase in production in the industrial sector. Then many roads and bridges were rehabilitated and built.

Also during this cabinet period, the Malari incident (Fifteenth of January Catastrophe) occurred on 15–16 January 1974 which coincided with the arrival of Japanese Prime Minister Tanaka Kakuei to Indonesia.

== Cabinet leaders ==
President	Vice President
Suharto	Hamengkubuwono IX

== Cabinet members ==
=== Ministers ===
The following are the ministers of the Second Development Cabinet.

Num.	Portfolio	Photo	Minister	Took office	Left office
Departmental Ministers
1	Minister of Home Affairs		Amir Machmud	28 March 1973	29 March 1978
2	Minister of Foreign Affairs		Adam Malik (Note: Adam Malik was appointed chairman of the MPR/DPR-RI. And Mashuri Saleh was sworn in as a member of the DPR/MPR-RI for the period 1977–1982.)	28 March 1973	1 October 1977
2	Minister of Foreign Affairs		Syarif Thayeb (ad-interim)	1 October 1977	29 March 1978
3	Minister of Defense and Security/Commander of ABRI		Maraden Panggabean	28 March 1973	29 March 1978
4	Minister of Justice		Oemar Senoadji (Note: Oemar Senoadji was appointed Chief Justice of the Supreme Court of Indonesia.)	28 March 1973	22 January 1974
4	Minister of Justice		Mochtar Kusumaatmadja	22 January 1974	29 March 1978
5	Minister of Information		Mashuri Saleh	28 March 1973	1 October 1977
5	Minister of Information		Sudharmono (ad-interim)	1 October 1977	29 March 1978
6	Minister of Industry		M. Jusuf	28 March 1973	29 March 1978
7	Minister of Trade		Radius Prawiro	28 March 1973	29 March 1978
8	Minister of Religious Affairs		Abdul Mukti Ali	28 March 1973	29 March 1978
9	Minister of Finance		Ali Wardhana (Note: Ali Wardhana was actually sworn in on 28 March 1973, but was sworn in only because he was serving abroad at that time.)	4 April 1973	29 March 1978
10	Minister of Agriculture		Thoyib Hadiwidjaja	28 March 1973	29 March 1978
11	Minister of Mines		Mohammad Sadli	28 March 1973	29 March 1978
12	Minister of Public Works and Electricity		Sutami	28 March 1973	29 March 1978
13	Minister of Transportation		Emil Salim	28 March 1973	29 March 1978
14	Minister of Education and Culture		Sumantri Brodjonegoro (Note: Passed away in office.)	28 March 1973	18 December 1973
14	Minister of Education and Culture		J.B. Sumarlin (ad-interim)	18 December 1973	22 January 1974
14	Minister of Education and Culture		Syarif Thayeb	January 22, 1974	29 March 1978
15	Minister of Health		G.A. Siwabessy	28 March 1973	29 March 1978
16	Minister of Social Affairs		Mohammad Syafa'at Mintaredja	28 March 1973	29 March 1978
17	Minister of Manpower, Transmigration, and Cooperatives		Subroto	28 March 1973	29 March 1978
State Ministers
18	State Minister of Economics and Finance/Chairman of the National Development Planning Body (BAPPENAS)		Widjojo Nitisastro	28 March 1973	29 March 1978
19	State Minister of People's Welfare		Sunawar Sukowati	28 March 1973	29 March 1978
20	State Minister of State Apparatus Control/Vice Chairman of the National Development Planning Body (BAPPENAS)		J.B. Sumarlin	28 March 1973	29 March 1978
21	State Minister of Research		Sumitro Djojohadikusomo	28 March 1973	29 March 1978
22	State Minister of Administration and Finance/State Secretary		Sudharmono	28 March 1973	29 March 1978

=== Officials with ministerial rank ===
The following are ministerial-level officials in the Second Development Cabinet.

Num.	Portfolio	Photo	Minister	Took office	Left office
1	Attorney General		Ali Said	4 April 1973	18 February 1981
2	Governor of the Central Bank		Rachmat Saleh	4 April 1973	5 April 1978
3	Commander of the Operational Command for the Restoration of Security and Order (KOPKAMTIB)/Deputy Commander of the ABRI		Sumitro (Note: Sumitro resigned from his position as Pangkopkamtib.)	4 April 1973	2 March 1974
3	Commander of the Operational Command for the Restoration of Security and Order (KOPKAMTIB)/Deputy Commander of the ABRI		Soeharto (Note: Since 2 March 1974, but who carried out his duties was Admiral Sudomo.)	2 March 1974	29 March 1978
