= Fifth Development Cabinet =

Fifth Development Cabinet Kabinet Pembangunan V
- 32nd Cabinet of Indonesia
- 1988–1993
- Date formed: 23 March 1988
- Date dissolved: 17 March 1993

People and organisations
- President: Suharto
- No. of ministers: 32 ministers
- Member parties: Functional Groups; Armed Forces; Indonesian Democratic Party; United Development Party
- Status in legislature: Coalition

History
- Predecessor: Development IV Cabinet
- Successor: Development VI Cabinet

The Fifth Development Cabinet (Indonesian: Kabinet Pembangunan V) was the Indonesian cabinet which served under President Suharto and Vice President Sudharmono from March 1988 until March 1993. The cabinet was formed after Suharto was elected to a 5th term as president by the People's Consultative Assembly (MPR).

== The five cabinet aims ==
- Continuing, intensifying, deepening, and expanding the execution of national development as an implementation of Pancasila with the Development Trilogy and national resilience as its foundation.
- Improving national discipline with a state apparatus as its pioneers and aiming towards a clean and legitimate government.
- Institutionalizing Pancasila, Pancasila democracy, and the Guide to Learn and Apply Pancasila (P4) in daily life as a community, state, and nation.
- Executing a free and active foreign policy for the national interest.
- Holding a direct, universal, free, and secret legislative election in 1992.

== President and vice president ==
President	Vice President
Suharto	Sudharmono

== Coordinating ministers ==
No.	Name
Coordinating Minister of Politics and Security	Sudomo
Coordinating Minister of Economics, Finance, and Industry	Radius Prawiro
Coordinating Minister of People's Welfare	Soepardjo Rustam

== Departmental ministers ==
Office	Name
Minister of Home Affairs	Rudini
Minister of Foreign Affairs	Ali Alatas
Minister of Defense and Security	Benny Moerdani
Minister of Justice	Ismail Saleh
Minister of Information	Harmoko
Minister of Finance	J. B. Sumarlin
Minister of Trade	Arifin Siregar
Minister of Industry	Hartarto Sastrosoenarto
Minister of Agriculture	Wardojo
Minister of Mines and Energy	Ginandjar Kartasasmita
Minister of Forestry	Hasjrul Harahap
Minister of Public Works	Radinal Mochtar
Minister of Transportation	Azwar Anas
Minister of Cooperatives	Bustanil Arifin
Minister of Manpower	Cosmas Batubara
Minister of Transmigration	Sugiharto
Minister of Tourism, Post, and Telecommunication	Susilo Sudarman
Minister of Education and Culture	Fuad Hassan
Minister of Health	Adhyatma
Minister of Religious Affairs	Munawir Sjadzali
Minister of Social Affairs	Haryati Soebadio

== State ministers ==
- State Minister/State Secretary: Brig. Gen. Murdiono
- State Minister of National Development Planning/Chairman of the National Development Planning Body (BAPPENAS): Saleh Afiff
- State Minister of Research and Technology/Chairman of the Research and Implementation of Technology (BPPT): B. J. Habibie
- State Minister of Population and Environment: Emil Salim
- State Minister of Housing: Siswono Yudo Husodo
- State Minister of Youth and Sports: Akbar Tanjung
- State Minister of State Apparatus Utilization: Sarwono Kusumaatmaja
- State Minister of Female Empowerment: Sulaiskin Murpratomo

== Junior ministers ==
- Junior Minister/Cabinet Secretary: Saadilah Mursyid
- Junior Minister of Finance: Nasrudin Sumintapura
- Junior Minister of Trade: Sudrajat Djiwandono
- Junior Minister of Industry: Tungky Ariwibowo
- Junior Minister of Agriculture: Sjarifuddin Baharsjah
- Junior Minister of National Development Planning/Vice Chairman of BAPPENAS: B. S. Muljana

== Officials with ministerial rank ==
- Commander of ABRI: Gen. Try Sutrisno
- Attorney General: Sukarton Marmosudjono
- Governor of the Central Bank: Adrianus Mooy

== Changes ==
- 1991: Sukarton Marmosudjono died and was replaced as Attorney General by Singgih.
- February 1993: Try Sutrisno was replaced as ABRI Commander by General Edi Sudrajat
