= First Development Cabinet =

First Development Cabinet Kabinet Pembangunan I
- 28th Cabinet of Indonesia
- 1968–1973
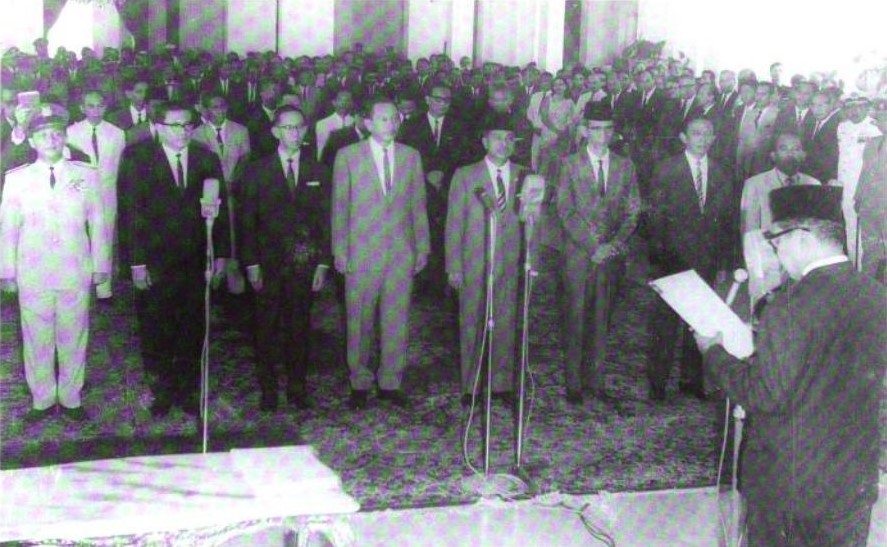
- Date formed: 10 June 1968
- Date dissolved: 27 March 1973

People and organisations
- President: Suharto
- No. of ministers: 25 ministers
- Member party: Indonesian National Armed Forces; Indonesian National Party; Indonesian Christian Party; Nahdlatul Ulama; Indonesian Muslims' Party; Independent

History
- Predecessor: Ampera II Cabinet
- Successor: Development II Cabinet

The First Development Cabinet (Indonesian: Kabinet Pembangunan I) is the name of the cabinet of the Indonesian government led by President Suharto. This cabinet was announced on 6 June 1968 and served from 10 June 1968 until 27 March 1973. The composition of this cabinet is not much different from the composition of ministers in the Revised Ampera Cabinet. Shortly after the 1971 election, on 9 September 1971, President Suharto announced a reshuffle of the First Development Cabinet and appointed the reshuffled ministers on 11 September 1971.

The main tasks of the cabinet, as stipulated in MPRS Decree No. XLI/MPRS/1968 and known as Panca Krida, were:

- Creating political and economic stability as the unnegotiable prerequisite for the success of the Five Year Development Plan and the Legislative Election.
- Organizing and executing the Five Year Development Plan.
- Holding Legislative Elections on 5 July 1971 at the latest.
- Restoring order and security to society by finishing off the leftovers of 30 September Movement and every threat, abuse, and betrayal of Pancasila and the 1945 Constitution.
- Continuing the universal reform and purge of the state apparatus at National and Regional Level.

On 1 April 1969 the implementation of First Pelita (1969–1974) began. The purpose of holding First Pelita is to improve the people's standard of living and at the same time lay the foundations for development in the next stage. While the targets are food, clothing, infrastructure improvement, public housing, expansion of employment opportunities, and spiritual welfare. The focus of First Pelita is the development of the agricultural sector in accordance with the aim of pursuing economic backwardness through the process of reforming the agricultural sector, because the majority of Indonesia's population still lives from agricultural products.

== Cabinet leader ==
President
| Suharto |

== Cabinet members ==
=== Ministers ===
The following are the ministers of the First Development Cabinet.

| Num. | Portfolio | Photo | Minister | Took office | Left office |
Departmental Ministers
| 1 | Minister of Home Affairs | | Basuki Rahmat (Note: Basuki Rahmat died of a heart attack. In this regard, based on Decree of the President of the Republic of Indonesia Number 10 of 1969 dated 22 January 1969, Amirmachmud succeeded him and was only sworn in on 28 January 1969.) | 10 June 1968 | 9 January 1969 |
| 1 | Minister of Home Affairs | | Amir Machmud | 28 January 1969 | 27 March 1973 |
| 2 | Minister of Foreign Affairs | | Adam Malik | 10 June 1968 | 27 March 1973 |
| 3 | Minister of Defense and Security (or Commander of the ABRI since 9 September 1971) | | Soeharto | 10 June 1968 | 27 March 1973 |
| 4 | Minister of Justice | | Oemar Senoadji | 10 June 1968 | 27 March 1973 |
| 5 | Minister of Information | | Boediardjo | 10 June 1968 | 27 March 1973 |
| 6 | Minister of Finance | | Ali Wardhana | 10 June 1968 | 27 March 1973 |
| 7 | Minister of Trade | | Sumitro Djojohadikusumo | 10 June 1968 | 27 March 1973 |
| 8 | Minister of Agriculture | | Thoyib Hadiwidjaja | 10 June 1968 | 27 March 1973 |
| 9 | Minister of Industry | | M. Jusuf | 10 June 1968 | 27 March 1973 |
| 10 | Minister of Mines | | Sumantri Brodjonegoro | 10 June 1968 | 27 March 1973 |
| 11 | Minister of Public Works and Electricity | | Sutami | 10 June 1968 | 27 March 1973 |
| 12 | Minister of Transportation | | Frans Seda | 10 June 1968 | 27 March 1973 |
| 13 | Minister of Education and Culture | | Mashuri Saleh | 10 June 1968 | 27 March 1973 |
| 14 | Minister of Health | | G. A. Siwabessy | 10 June 1968 | 27 March 1973 |
| 15 | Minister of Religious Affairs | | Muhammad Dahlan (Note: Based on the Decree of the President of the Republic of Indonesia Number 64 of 1971 dated 9 September 1971, it was announced the reshuffle of the First Development Cabinet and was inaugurated on 11 September 1971.) | 10 June 1968 | 11 September 1971 |
| 15 | Minister of Religious Affairs | | Mukti Ali | 11 September 1971 | 27 March 1973 |
| 16 | Minister of Manpower | | Mursalin Daeng Mamangung | 10 June 1968 | 11 September 1971 |
| 16 | Minister of Manpower | | Mohammad Sadli | 11 September 1971 | 27 March 1973 |
| 17 | Minister of Transmigration and Cooperatives | | M. Sarbini | 10 June 1968 | 11 September 1971 |
| 17 | Minister of Transmigration and Cooperatives | | Subroto | 11 September 1971 | 27 March 1973 |
| 18 | Minister of Social Affairs | | Albert Mangaratua Tambunan (Note: Passed away in office.) | 10 June 1968 | 12 December 1970 |
| 18 | Minister of Social Affairs | | Idham Chalid (ad-interim) | 12 December 1970 | 11 September 1971 |
| 18 | Minister of Social Affairs | | Mohammad Syafa'at Mintaredja | 11 September 1971 | 27 March 1973 |
State Ministers
| 19 | State Minister of Economics, Finance, and Industry | | Sri Sultan Hamengkubuwana IX | 10 June 1968 | 27 March 1973 |
| 20 | State Minister of People's Welfare | | Idham Chalid (Note: Idham Chalid was appointed a member of the DPR/MPR-RI for the period 1971–1977.) | 10 June 1968 | 28 October 1971 |
| 21 | State Minister of Supervision of Development Operations (the fractional position of State Minister of Government Projects Supervision since 11 September 1971) | | Sunawar Sukowati | 11 September 1971 | 27 March 1973 |
| 22 | State Minister of Oversight of Government Projects (named State Minister of National Development Planning / Chairman of the National Development Planning Agency since 11 September 1971) | | Sunawar Sukowati | 10 June 1968 | 11 September 1971 |
| 22 | State Minister of Oversight of Government Projects (named State Minister of National Development Planning / Chairman of the National Development Planning Agency since 11 September 1971) | | Widjojo Nitisastro | 11 September 1971 | 27 March 1973 |
| 23 | State Minister of Relations between the Government with the MPRS/DPR-GR, and DPA (this position was abolished since 11 September 1971) | | Mohammad Syafa'at Mintaredja | 10 June 1968 | 11 September 1971 |
| 24 | Assistant State Minister of Control of Defense and Security and Deputy Commander of the ABRI (new position since 11 September 1971) | | Maraden Panggabean | 11 September 1971 | 27 March 1973 |
| 25 | State Minister of Improvement and Cleaning of State Apparatuses concurrently Deputy Chairman of the National Development Planning Agency | | Harsono Tjokroaminoto | 10 June 1968 | 11 September 1971 |
| 25 | State Minister of Improvement and Cleaning of State Apparatuses concurrently Deputy Chairman of the National Development Planning Agency | | Emil Salim | 11 September 1971 | 27 March 1973 |

=== Official with ministerial rank ===
The following are ministerial-level officials in the First Development Cabinet.

| Num. | Portfolio | Photo | Minister | Took office | Left office |
|---|---|---|---|---|---|
| 1 | Minister of State Secretariat | | Alamsyah Ratu Perwiranegara | 9 February 1968 | 8 April 1972 |
| 1 | Minister of State Secretariat | | Sudharmono (Note: Through Presidential Decree Number 57/M of 1972 dated 8 April 1972, Major General Sudharmono was appointed as State Secretary to replace Lt. Gen. Alamsyah Ratu Perwiranegara. In accordance with Presidential Decree Number 30 of 1972 dated 5 April 1972, he also held concurrent positions as Cabinet Secretary.) | 8 April 1972 | 27 March 1973 |
| 2 | Attorney General | | Sugih Arto | 30 March 1966 | 27 March 1973 |
| 3 | Governor of the Central Bank | | Radius Prawiro | 30 March 1966 | 27 March 1973 |
| 4 | Commander of the Operational Command for the Restoration of Security and Order | | Soeharto | 1 November 1965 | 19 November 1969 |
| 4 | Commander of the Operational Command for the Restoration of Security and Order | | Maraden Panggabean (Note: Maj. Gen. Maraden Panggabean was appointed as Assistant State Minister of Control of Defense and Security and concurrently held the position of Deputy Commander of the ABRI.) | 19 November 1969 | 11 September 1971 |
| 4 | Commander of the Operational Command for the Restoration of Security and Order | | Soemitro | 11 September 1971 | 27 March 1973 |

== Reshuffle ==
On 9 September 1971, President Suharto made a decision to adjust and replace several Development Cabinet ministers after careful evaluation and consideration. The replacement of several ministers does not imply the formation of a cabinet, but solely to further enhance the implementation of development in the Panca Krida Development Cabinet.

=== Given another assignment ===
The ministers who were replaced were given new obligations according to their respective capabilities. Some are members of the Supreme Advisory Council and some are assigned abroad. This replacement will actually improve the implementation of the Development Cabinet's tasks. So most of the ministers who were appointed were those who from the beginning took part in carrying out Government policies, particularly in the economic and development fields. Thus, it is hoped that the continuity of the policies outlined for the smooth implementation of the Development Cabinet's duties will be more guaranteed.

=== Reshuffle Cabinet appointments ===
The inauguration was held on Saturday, 11 September 1971.
