= Fourth Development Cabinet =

Fourth Development Cabinet Kabinet Pembangunan IV
- 31st Cabinet of Indonesia
- 1983–1988
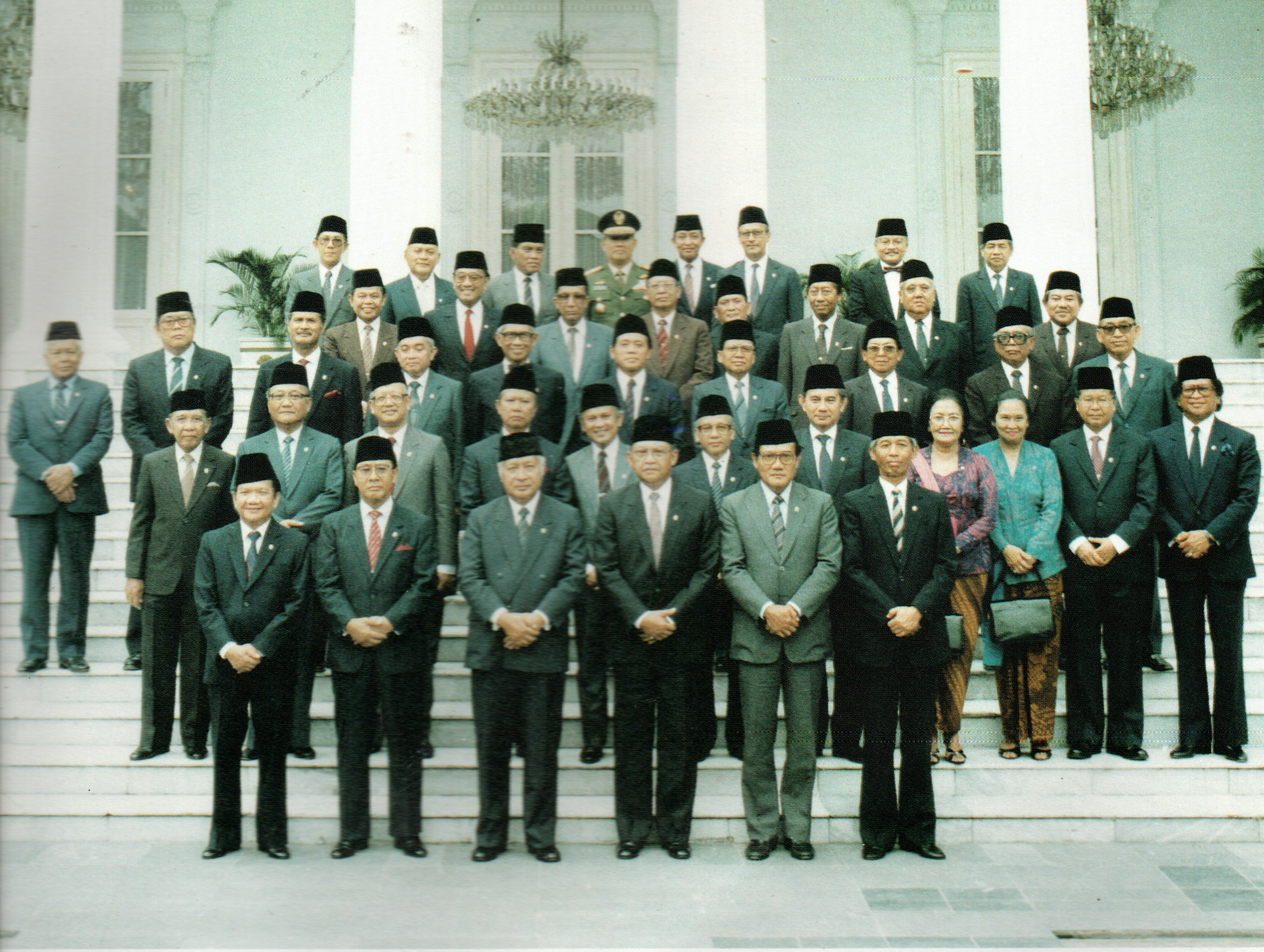
- Date formed: 19 March 1983
- Date dissolved: 21 March 1988

People and organisations
- President: Suharto
- No. of ministers: 32 ministers
- Member parties: Functional Groups; Armed Forces; Indonesian Democratic Party; United Development Party
- Status in legislature: Coalition

History
- Predecessor: Development III Cabinet
- Successor: Development V Cabinet

The Fourth Development Cabinet (Indonesian: Kabinet Pembangunan IV) was the Indonesian cabinet which served under President Suharto and Vice President Umar Wirahadikusumah from March 1983 until March 1988. The cabinet was formed after Suharto was elected to a 4th term as president by the People's Consultative Assembly (MPR).

== The five cabinet aims ==
- Intensifying the Development Trilogy with the support of a stronger national resilience.
- Intensifying administrative reform and aiming towards a clean and legitimate government.
- Intensifying the institutionalization of Pancasila in developing Pancasila democracy and the Guide to Learn and Apply Pancasila (P4) and to strengthen the unity and oneness of the nation.
- Intensifying the free and active foreign policy for the sake of national interest.
- Holding a direct, universal, free, and secret Legislative election in 1987.

== President and vice president ==
President	Vice President
Suharto	Umar Wirahadikusumah

== Coordinating ministers ==
- Coordinating Minister of Politics and Security: Gen. (ret.) Surono
- Coordinating Minister of Economics, Finance, Industry and Development Supervision: Ali Wardhana
- Coordinating Minister of People's Welfare: Lt. Gen. (ret.) Alamsjah Prawiranegara

== Departmental ministers ==
- Minister of Home Affairs: Lt. Gen. Supardjo Rustam
- Minister of Foreign Affairs: Mochtar Kusumaatmadja
- Minister of Defense and Security: Gen. (ret.) Poniman
- Minister of Justice: Ali Said
- Minister of Information: Harmoko
- Minister of Finance: Radius Prawiro
- Minister of Trade: Rachmat Saleh
- Minister of Cooperatives: Lt. Gen. (ret.) Bustanil Arifin
- Minister of Agriculture: Achmad Affandi
- Minister of Forestry: Soedjarwo
- Minister of Industry: Hartarto Sastrosoenarto
- Minister of Mines and Energy: Subroto
- Minister of Public Works: Suyono Sosrodarsono
- Minister of Transportation: Air Marshal (ret.) Rusmin Nuryadin
- Minister of Tourism, Post, and Telecommunication: Lt. Gen. (ret.) Achmad Tahir
- Minister of Manpower: Admiral (ret.) Sudomo
- Minister of Transmigration: Martono
- Minister of Education and Culture: Brig. Gen. (Hon) Nugroho Notosusanto
- Minister of Health: Suwardjono Suryaningrat
- Minister of Religious Affairs: Munawir Sjadzali
- Minister of Social Affairs: Nani Sudarsono

== State ministers ==
- State Minister/State Secretary: Lt. Gen. (ret.) Sudharmono
- State Minister of National Development Planning/Chairman of the National Development Planning Body (BAPPENAS): J. B. Sumarlin
- State Minister of Research and Technology/Chairman of the Research and Implementation of Technology Board (BPPT): B. J. Habibie
- State Minister of Population and Environment: Emil Salim
- State Minister of Housing: Cosmas Batubara
- State Minister of Youth and Sports: Lt. Col. Abdul Gafur
- State Minister of State Apparatus Utilization/Vice Chairman of BAPPENAS: Saleh Afiff
- State Minister of Female Empowerment: L. Soetanto

== Junior ministers ==
- Junior Minister/Cabinet Secretary: Brig. Gen. Murdiono
- Junior Minister of the Intensification of Consumption of Nationally-made Goods: Ginandjar Kartasasmita
- Junior Minister of the Intensification of Foodstuffs Production: Wardojo
- Junior Minister of the Intensification of Perennial Production: Hasjrul Harahap
- Junior Minister of the Intensification of Animal Husbandry and Fisheries Production: J. H. Hutasoit

== Officials with ministerial status ==
- Attorney General: Ismael Saleh
- Governor of the Central Bank: Arifin M. Siregar
- Commander of the Armed Forces: Gen. Benny Moerdani

== Changes ==
- June 1985: Nugroho Notosusanto died and was replaced by Fuad Hassan as Minister of Education and Culture.
- L. Soesanto died and was replaced by A. S. Murpratomo as State Minister of Female Empowerment.
- February 1988: Benny Moerdani was replaced as Commander of ABRI by General Try Sutrisno.
