= Ali Wardhana =

Indonesian economist and professor (1928–2015)

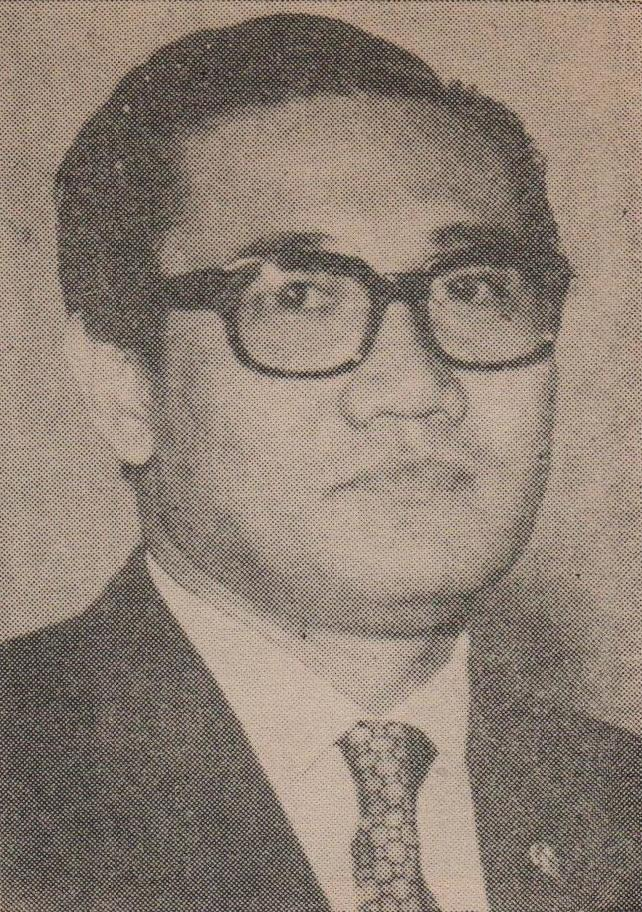
- Official portrait, c. 1973

3rd Coordinating Minister for Economics, Finance, Industry, and Development of Indonesia
- In office 19 March 1983 – 21 March 1988
- President: Suharto
- Preceded by: Widjojo Nitisastro
- Succeeded by: Radius Prawiro

21st Minister of Finance of Indonesia
- In office 6 June 1968 – 19 March 1983
- President: Suharto
- Preceded by: Frans Seda
- Succeeded by: Radius Prawiro

Personal details
- Born: 6 May 1928 Surakarta, Central Java, Dutch East Indies
- Died: 14 September 2015 (aged 87) Jakarta, Indonesia
- Resting place: Tanah Kusir Cemetery
- Citizenship: Indonesian
- Party: Golkar
- Spouse: Rendasih
- Children: 4
- Parent: Aliman (father)
- Relatives: Ali Sastroamidjojo (uncle)
- Education: University of Indonesia; University of California, Berkeley
- Occupation: Economist; professor

Ali Wardhana (6 May 1928 – 14 September 2015), more colloquially known as Bung Ali, was an Indonesian professor and economist, who served as the third Coordinating Minister for Economics, Finance, Industry, and Development of Indonesia from 1983 until 1988 and the 21st minister of finance of Indonesia from 1968 until 1983. He was one of Indonesia's most senior economic policy-makers during the New Order regime of President Suharto, being a member of the influential Berkeley Mafia, a group of American-educated Indonesian economists who shaped the Indonesian economy during the New Order. He was the longest-serving Minister of Finance, as well as the fifth longest-serving minister in Indonesian history.

He was born on 6 May 1928, in the city of Surakarta. He studied economics at the Faculty of Economics of the University of Indonesia (UI) in 1958. Subsequently earned a Master of Arts in 1961 and a doctorate in economics from the University of California, Berkeley. He returned to Indonesia in 1967 and was appointed as the Dean of the Faculty of Economics of UI, replacing Widjojo Nitisastro. Less than one year later, he became Minister of Finance in the First Development Cabinet of Indonesian President Suharto. As finance minister, he tackled rising inflation, reducing it to 10% in 1969, from a high 650% in 1966. He also liked to conduct unannounced inspections and managed to apprehend corrupt officials and smugglers. Under his leadership, there were two devaluations of the Rupiah, which occurred in 1977 and 1978.

In 1983, he was transferred to the position of Coordinating Minister for Economics, Finance, Industry, and Development of Indonesia in the Fourth Development Cabinet, replacing Radius Prawiro, who took over as finance minister. After leaving the government in 1988, Ali continued to advise the government on its economic and financial policies. Ali died at Medistra Hospital, Jakarta on September 14, 2015. Before he died, Ali had been hospitalized for three weeks. His body was interred at the Tanah Kusir Public Cemetery, instead of the Kalibata Heroes' Cemetery.

== Early life and education ==
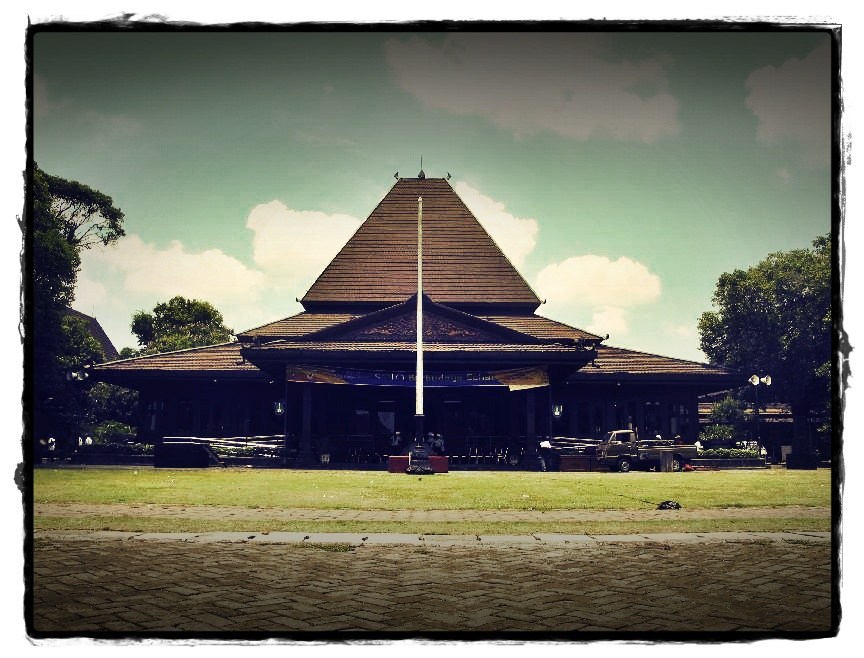
His hometown of Surakarta, more commonly known as Solo

Ali Wardhana was born on 6 May 1928, in the city of Surakarta, more commonly known as Solo. His mother died when he was almost five years old. His father, Aliman, would remarry to a woman named Bulik, Ali's aunt. Ali's childhood was mainly spent in Surakarta. Ali moved around several times. Around this time, he reportedly resided in the house of his uncle, Ali Sastroamidjojo, an Indonesian nationalist and statesman, who would go on to become Prime Minister of Indonesia. His childhood home has now become a shop.

Growing up, Ali did not receive a formal education. Instead, he was homeschooled by his stepmother, Bulik. However, he eventually entered formal schooling in 1930 and was immediately placed in the fifth grade of the People's School (now the equivalent of elementary school). He went to the University of Indonesia (UI) and initially studied medicine for a year. However, he withdrew from the faculty, after being cut off by his parents. He continued to study at UI but changed faculties. Choosing the Faculty of Economics, as it provided scholarships. Despite receiving a scholarship, he worked a couple of odd jobs on the side, working at a travel service provider's office.

During his time at UI, he was taught by foreign lecturers from the Netherlands about economics, as the only native economist with an economics doctorate, was Sumitro Djojohadikusumo. However, as tensions grew between Indonesia and the Dutch Government over the West New Guinea dispute, Dutch lecturers began to leave the country. Resulting in UI turning to the Ford Foundation for assistance. The Ford Foundation then began a process where students from UI were chosen to undertake overseas studies at the University of California, Berkeley. After finishing his studies at UI in 1958, and having a short stint as a lecturer at UI, where he was known to be an expert in the fields of macroeconomics and monetary policy, and was able to explain the material briefly and clearly, he was then sent abroad to continue his studies at the University of California, Berkeley.

Ali continued his master's education at the University of California, Berkeley, United States. With the costs of his education being fully funded through the scholarship he received from the Ford Foundation. While in the United States, Ali was particularly interested in fiscal and monetary studies. He managed to complete not only his master's program but also his doctoral program and Master of Arts degree, while in Berkeley. A year later, Ali received a Doctor of Philosophy in 1962, with the dissertation title "Monetary Policy in an Underdeveloped Economy with Special Reference to Indonesia" (1962). During his time in Berkeley, he was supported by several friends, including J.B. Sumarlin and Emil Salim, both fellow future ministers in the New Order.

=== Finance minister ===
==== Appointment ====
He returned to Indonesia in 1967 and was appointed the Dean of the Faculty of Economics of the University of Indonesia, replacing Widjojo Nitisastro. Less than one year later, Ali Wardhana became Minister of Finance in the First Development Cabinet of Indonesian President Suharto, becoming the youngest finance minister in Indonesian history. This has resulted in the media even pinning on him the title "menteri ingusan" which roughly translates to "don't know anything minister."

In an English-language book entitled "A Tribute to Ali Wardhana, Indonesia's Longest Serving Finance Minister: From His Writing and His Colleagues" published by Kompas, which was released to commemorate Ali Wardhana's 87th Anniversary, there is one story when President Suharto summoned Ali and asked him to become finance minister.

"When Suharto's first cabinet was formed, Pak Harto called me to become Minister of Finance. I immediately came to see him and said that I couldn't become Minister of Finance. Pak Harto looked at me and said "You think I want to be president? I've never been president. You have never been the Minister of Finance. So don't worry, we learn together," said Ali.

==== Tenure ====
Early on after his appointment, he was tasked with tackling the high inflation rate, which reportedly caused stress and caused him to not sleep well. At the time, inflation had reached a high of 650% in 1966. He was successful at tackling high inflation, with inflation falling from 650% in 1966, to 112% in 1967, to 85% in 1968, to 10% in 1969 under his tenure.

As finance minister, he began a crusade against illegal levies and extortion, together with Minister of State Control of State Apparatus (currently Ministry of State Apparatus Utilization and Bureaucratic Reform) J.B. Sumarli. At the time illegal levies occurred in State Treasurer's Office. J.B. Sumarlin even disguised himself as a staff a work unit named Ahmad Sidik to discover the practice of extortion. After that incident, nobody else dared to collect illegal levies.

=== Death and legacy ===
Ali died at Medistra Hospital, Jakarta on September 14, 2015, at 15:30 WIB. Before he died, Ali was treated for three weeks.

== Work with government ==
A brief summary of Ali Wardhana's career is as follows:

- 1966: Member of the team of economics experts advising the acting president of Indonesia.
- 1968: Minister of Finance in the First Development Cabinet.
- 1969: Chair, Monetary Council.
- 1973: Minister of Finance in the Second Development Cabinet.
- 1975: Deputy Chair, Board of Governors of the Islamic Development Bank.
- 1978: Minister of Finance in the Third Development Cabinet.
- 1983: Coordinating Minister of Economics, Finance, Industry and Development Supervision in the Fourth Development Cabinet.
- 1988: retired as a senior government minister and remained active as a senior economist in numerous positions.

== Honours ==
=== National Honours ===
- Indonesia:
  - Star of Mahaputera, 2nd Class (4 April 1973)
  - Satyalancana Dwidya Sistha

=== Foreign Honours ===
- Belgium:
  - Grand Cross of the Order of Leopold II (15 January 1970)
- Netherlands:
  - Knight Grand Cross of the Order of Orange-Nassau (25 August 1971)

== Personal life ==
Ali Wardhana married a woman named Rendasih (d. 2000), nicknamed Renny, who was a school teacher from Bandung. Together they had four children, Isyana Ika Wardhana, Mahendra Wardhana, Pradjnawita Wardhana, and Pradjanamita Wardhana.

== Writings ==
- Monetary Budget: A Tool for Stabilization or Inflation
- Economic and Social Institutions (1966)
- Economic Development and the Availability of Special Funds
- Statement at the Annual Meeting of the Asian Development Bank (1969)
- Concessional Loans and Technical Assistance
- Statement at the Annual Meeting of the Asian Development Bank (1970).
