= Berkeley Mafia =

Indonesian economists and political advisors

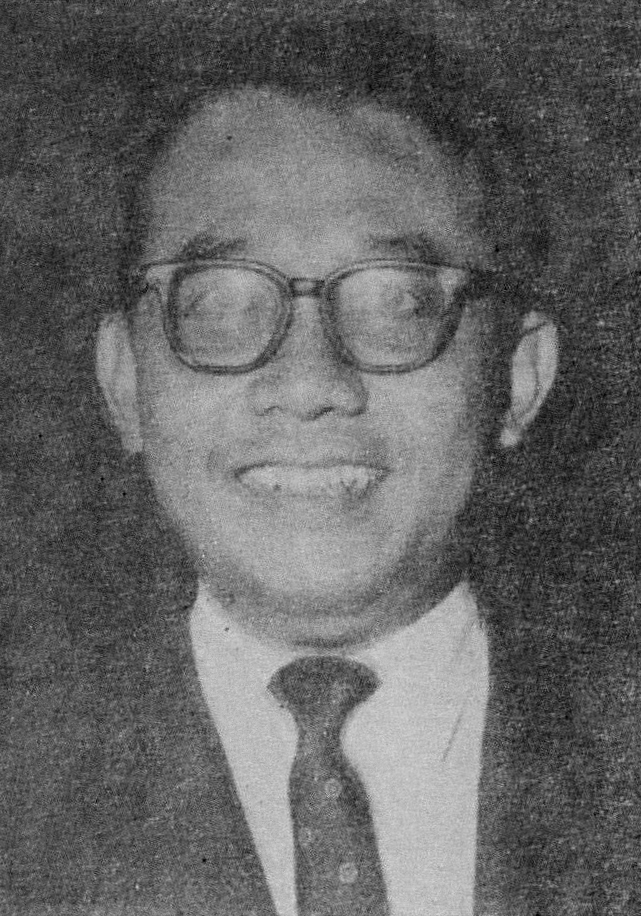
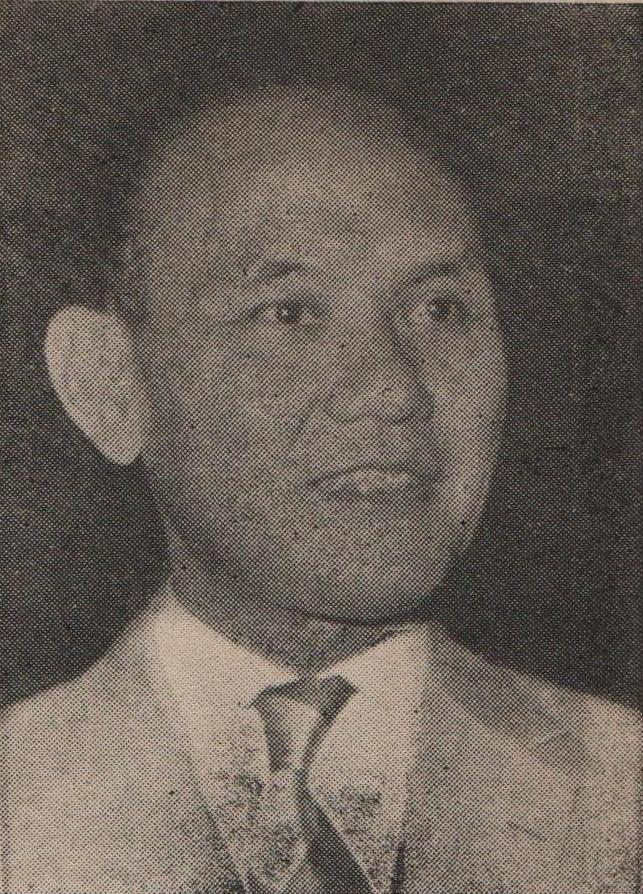
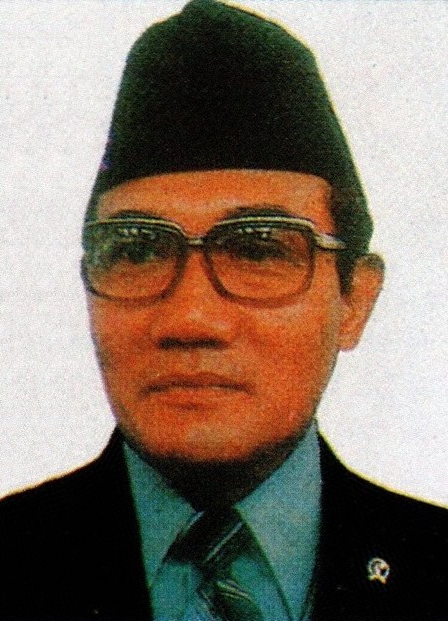
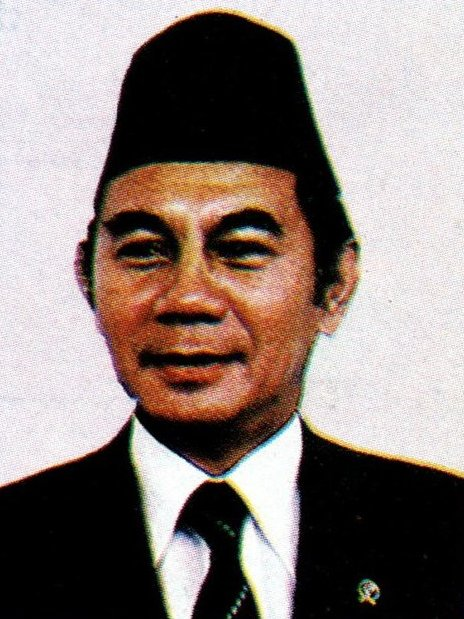
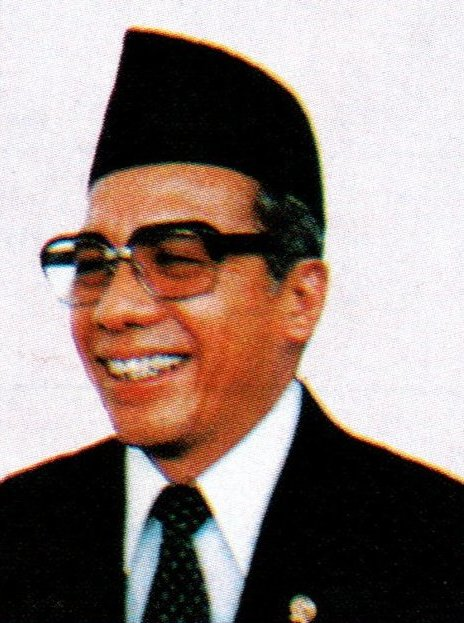
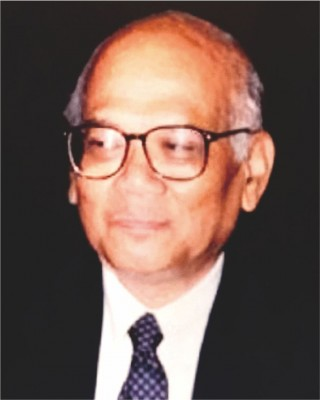
The economists who are considered members of the "Berkeley Mafia."

The Berkeley Mafia was the term given to a group of University of California-trained economists in Indonesia who were given technocratic positions under the Suharto dictatorship during the late 1960s. They were appointed in the early stages of the New Order administration. Their work focused on promoting free-market capitalism in Indonesia and reversing many of the economic reforms that had been introduced by the Sukarno government, besides that Suharto claimed that he rejects capitalism, however later he supported capitalism. The economic system in place under the New Order regime was termed crony capitalism due to the vast corruption within the country throughout this period. The Berkeley Mafia, like the Suharto dictatorship itself, aligned with the United States during the Cold War.

While sharing many similarities with the Chicago Boys in Chile (1970s–80s), such as staunch anti-communism, the Berkeley Mafia was not considered to be neoliberal unlike the former.

The group included Widjojo Nitisastro, Mohammad Sadli, Emil Salim, J. B. Sumarlin, and Ali Wardhana. Dorodjatun Kuntjoro-Jakti who graduated later from Berkeley is also sometimes included as a member of this group.

== Origins ==
In the mid-1950s, the economists who would become the Berkeley Mafia were students at the Faculty of Economics at the University of Indonesia (FEUI). The faculty was headed by Sumitro Djojohadikusumo, an economist who had served as Minister of Trade and Industry and Minister of Finance for the Government. Sumitro was the only teacher with an economics doctorate and so had to turn to foreign lecturers from the Netherlands and lecturers from other faculties to assist in educating the students at FEUI.

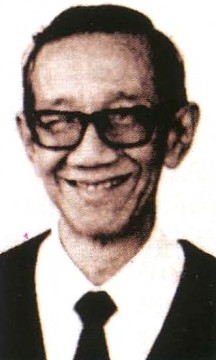
Sumitro Djojohadikusumo

As tensions grew between Indonesia and the Dutch government over West Irian (now known as West Papua), Dutch lecturers began to leave the country. Sumitro turned to the Ford Foundation for assistance. The Ford Foundation then began a process by which students from the FEUI were chosen to undertake overseas studies at the University of California, Berkeley. After the Ford Foundation had conducted some preliminary preparations, the overseas studies program began in 1957. By the early 1960s, all of the students who had been sent abroad had returned from Berkeley and had begun taking up positions as lecturers at the Army Staff and Command College (SESKOAD).

In 1966, General Suharto took over executive control in Indonesia from President Sukarno in a coup by virtue of Supersemar. Although he would not formally become president for another two years, Suharto began laying down the foundations for what would become the New Order regime. In late August 1966, Suharto held a seminar at SESKOAD to discuss political and economic matters and the way in which the New Order would approach those problems. The FEUI economists, headed by Widjojo Nitisastro, attended the seminar.

During the seminar, the economists set out their ideas and policy recommendations. Their presentation impressed Suharto, who invited them to begin work as a team of experts in the field of economics and finance. For his accomplishments, Sumitro Djojohadikusumo was often called the "Godfather of Indonesian economists", a title he disliked.

== Accomplishments and controversies ==
On October 3, 1966, on the advice of these economists and others, Suharto announced a program aimed at stabilization and rehabilitation of Indonesia's economy. The Berkeley Mafia focused on low inflation, fiscal constraint, and market deregulation. The program also aimed at rehabilitation of infrastructure and development of the agricultural sector. At the same time, an international program to support economic recovery was established under the auspices of a newly-formed Inter-Governmental Group on Indonesia.

The new economic program was successful at stabilizing the economy. Inflation fell from 650% in 1966 to only 13% in 1969. After Suharto became president in 1968, the members of the Berkeley Mafia team were appointed to ministerial and senior advisory posts in Suharto's cabinet. Thus, the group had a great influence on economic policy and successfully brought Indonesia's economy to an unprecedented growth period. The growth rate was high, averaging around 6.5% per year between the late 1960s and 1997, when South East Asia was hit by the severe Asian financial crisis.

The Berkeley Mafia's liberal approach towards economics was not supported by everyone. Within the New Order, it encountered opposition from generals such as Ali Murtopo, Ibnu Sutowo and Ali Sadikin, whose economic approaches were more nationalistic in nature. Some other groups, like the Indonesian branch of Hizb ut-Tahrir, considered the Berkeley Mafia to be traitors, a view stemming particularly from its willingness to privatise the nation's industries. With the beginning of the oil boom in the mid-1970s, Suharto favored the economic nationalists and so the Berkeley Mafia's influence was restricted. The Pangaribuan (1995: 248) said later that, Suharto remained a stubborn economic nationalist. Jan P. Wenger had a different view and wrote that Suharto embraced developmentalism. Another view is that Suharto advocated for protectionist (State-led economics) policies, other countries had similar economic policies, some of the leaders of the country saw themselves as Third Position or as Third Way advocater, however Suharto didn't supported the Third Position or the Third Way.

Suharto would turn to the Berkeley Mafia again in the mid-1980s, when the price of oil began to drop and with it Indonesia's economic growth. The Berkeley Mafia presided over the liberalization, deregulation, and the renewed growth of the Indonesian economy. Once again, the Indonesian economy began to grow, and once again, the Berkeley Mafia encountered political opposition. This time, their opponents were Sudharmono and Ginandjar Kartasasmita, who advocated economic nationalism, as well as BJ Habibie, who wanted a technology-centered economic development. As on the previous occasion, Suharto sided with the economic nationalists, and the Berkeley Mafia's power weakened.

During Indonesia's economic collapse from the 1997 Asian financial crisis, people blamed the Berkeley Mafia and considered it to be part of the New Order regime. During the Reform era, only Widjojo was retained in the government.

== Post-Suharto era ==
Out of the Berkeley Mafia group, only Widjojo Nitisastro and Emil Salim continued to have significant influence within government during the post-Suharto Reform era. Widjojo Nitisastro became an economic advisor to presidents B. J. Habibie. B.J. Habibie embraced beside this economic nationalist policies, which B.J. Habibie called "Pancasila-based Market economy". Wahid (Gus Dur), and Megawati. Emil Salim later served as the leader of the Presidential Advisory Council during Susilo Bambang Yudhoyono's administration and also continued to be active on environmental issues, both in Indonesia and in international circles. Mohammad Sadli remained well known as a senior economic commentator until his death in 2008.

As of today, Emil Salim and Dorodjatun Kuntjoro-Jakti are two surviving member of the Berkeley Mafia.

== See also ==
- Chicago Boys – a similar group from Chile
- The Shock Doctrine – a book in which the Berkeley Mafia is compared to the Chicago Boys.
- Solo Gang – grouping associated to former president Joko Widodo.

== Additional reading ==
- Elson, Robert (2001). Suharto: A Political Biography. UK: The Press Syndicate of the University of Cambridge. ISBN 0-521-77326-1.
- Nitisastro, Widjojo (2011). The Indonesian Development Experience: A Collection of Writings and Speeches of Widjojo Nitisastro. Singapore: Institute of Southeast Asian Studies. ISBN 978-981-4311-75-5.
