= J. B. Sumarlin =

Indonesian politician (1932–2020)

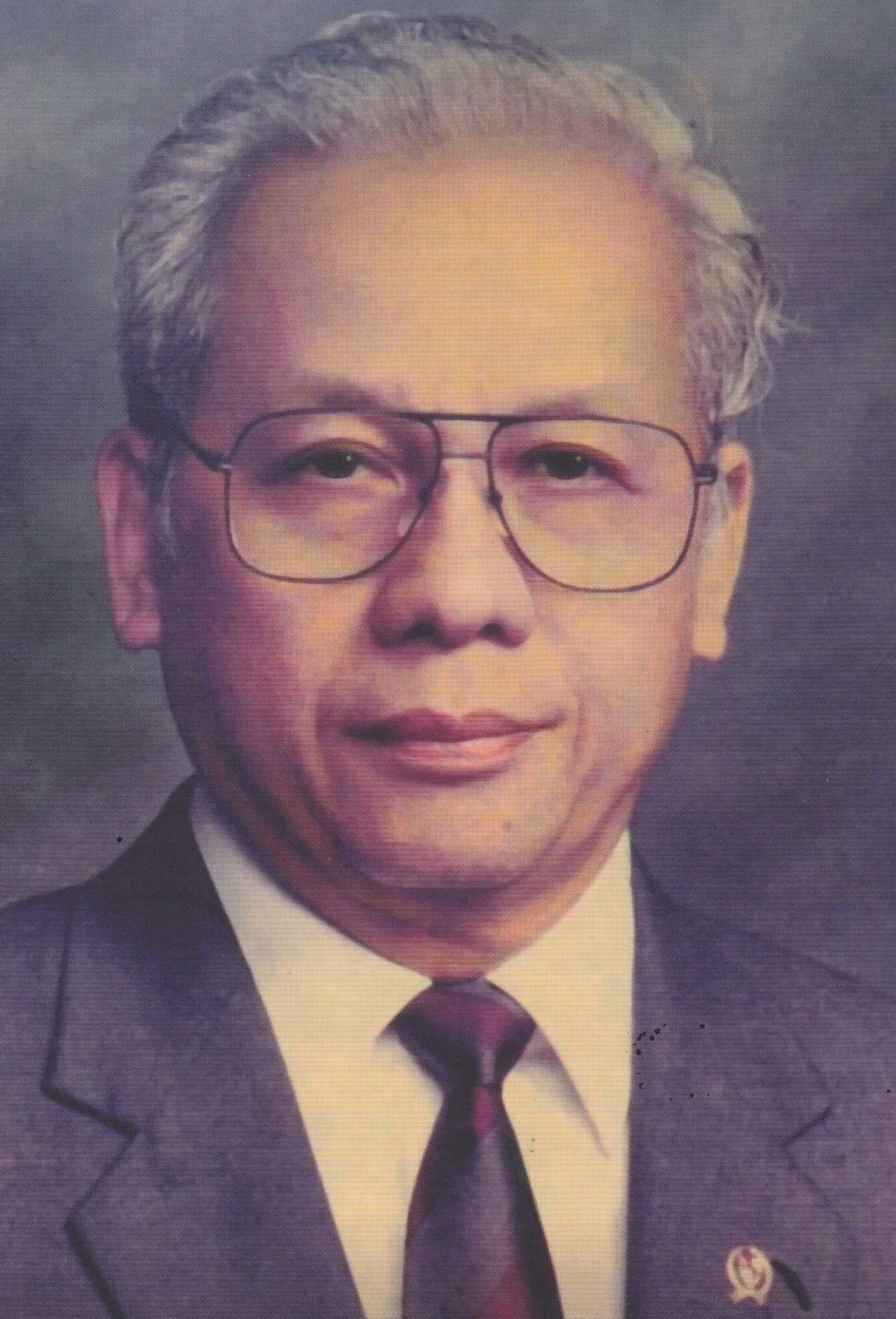

Chair of the Audit Board of Indonesia
- In office 1993–1998
- President: Suharto
- Preceded by: M. Jusuf
- Succeeded by: Satrio Budihardjo Joedono

Minister of Finance
- In office 21 March 1988 – 17 March 1993
- President: Suharto
- Preceded by: Radius Prawiro
- Succeeded by: Mar'ie Muhammad

Head of National Development Planning Agency
- In office 19 March 1983 – 21 March 1988
- President: Suharto
- Preceded by: Widjojo Nitisastro
- Succeeded by: Saleh Afiff

Minister of State for Administrative and Bureaucratic Reform
- In office 28 March 1973 – 19 March 1983
- President: Suharto
- Preceded by: Emil Salim
- Succeeded by: Saleh Afiff

Personal details
- Born: Johannes Baptista Sumarlin; 7 December 1932 Nglegok, Blitar, Dutch East Indies
- Died: 6 February 2020 (aged 87) Jakarta, Indonesia
- Spouse: Theresia Sudarmi (m. 1961)
- Children: Five
- Parents: Sapoean Pawirodikromo (father); Karmilah (mother)
- Education: University of Indonesia; University of California, Berkeley

Johannes Baptista Sumarlin (7 December 1932 – 6 February 2020) was an Indonesian economist who served as Minister of Finance. Sometimes linked with the so-called Berkeley Mafia group of economic advisers which included senior Indonesian economists such as Widjojo Nitisastro, Emil Salim, and Ali Wardhana, Sumarlin held various important economics posts in the Indonesian government for many years until the late 1990s. He graduated from the Faculty of Economics, University of Indonesia (FEUI) in 1958. Positions held in government included, among others, Chairman of the Supreme Audit Agency, Minister of Finance, Chairman of the National Planning Agency (Bappenas), and Minister for Administrative and Bureaucratic Reform.

== Early life ==
Sumarlin graduated with an M.A. in economics from the University of California, Berkeley in 1960, and a doctorate from the University of Pittsburgh in 1968. His master's thesis was about Some Aspects of American and Indonesian Fiscal and Monetary Policies: A Comparative Study and his doctoral thesis was entitled Some Aspects of Stabilization Policies and Their Institutional Problems: The Indonesian Case 1950-1960.

After graduating with an undergraduate degree (S1 in the Indonesian system) at the University of Indonesia in 1958, Sumarlin served as a teaching assistant for some years. In 1965 he was appointed as a lecturer in the FEUI, then as a professor in 1979. Previously, he had worked in an industrial company in Jakarta. During earlier political struggles, Sumarlin had worked as a member of the Indonesian Red Cross, and as a recruit in the Indonesian armed forces (Tentara Nasional Indonesia, or TNI) in East Java. For his service, in 1973 he received the Mahaputra Utama star, one of the highest honours awarded in Indonesia. Two years later he was awarded the Grand Cross in the Order of Leopold II of the Belgian government. In his private life, Sumarlin was a sports enthusiast and enjoyed tennis and jogging. He was married to Th. Yostiana Soedarmi. Together they had four children.

Sumarlin had a slight build and this was associated with an incident that became well known among his colleagues in Jakarta. Around 1969, during the early stage of the work of the New Order government of President Soeharto, in his position as Deputy Minister of the Indonesian National Planning Agency, Bappenas, Sumarlin was often required to accompany the Chair of Bappenas, Professor Widjojo Nitisastro, to Cabinet meetings. During one of the meetings at the National Palace, Cabinet Secretary Sudharmono is said to have casually gestured towards Sumarlin asking, "Who is the boy sitting there, Widjojo?" Widjojo then introduced Sumarlin to the Cabinet Secretary. Sudharmono responded that, indeed, he recalled that Widjojo had mentioned that he was recruiting a team to work with him in the National Planning Agency.

After the incident, Sumarlin was reluctant to continue attending Cabinet meetings, knowing that attendance was usually severely limited and the names of participants needed to be notified to Cabinet Secretary Sudharmono beforehand. But Widjojo encouraged Sumarlin to continue attending. Widjojo's approach proved correct because, in time, Sumarlin became one of Soeharto's most trusted economics advisers.

While serving as Deputy Chair of Bappenas, Sumarlin was closely involved in drafting government reforms with guidance from Cabinet Secretary Sudharmono. He was regularly involved, for example, in the preparation of the key Annex document attached to the Presidential State Address released on August 16 each year for presentation to parliament. He was also actively in government administration as a member of various official teams charged with reviews of procedures governing such things as controls over the procurement of goods and equipment.

== Experience in government ==
Although of modest stature and known for a disarming smile, Sumarlin became an effective minister during the period of the New Order government in Indonesia. From 1970 through to 1998, he was influential in guiding economic and financial policy. Along with Widjojo and other ministers in the economic team, Sumarlin became a key economic policy adviser to President Soeharto.

From 1970 to 1973 Sumarlin was secretary to the Indonesian Monetary Board. Previously he had held the post of deputy minister for Fiscal and Monetary Affairs in the Indonesian National Planning Agency. During the next ten years (1973–1983), Sumarlin served as Minister of State for Administrative Control. Later, between 1983 and 1988, he was appointed to the position of State Minister for National Development Planning, concurrently holding the post of Chairman of the National Development Planning Agency (Bappenas). On the sidelines during that period he was appointed interim Minister of Finance, and also Minister of Education & Culture ad interim replacing Prof. Dr. Nugroho Notosusanto who died in 1985.

Sumarlin then became Minister of Finance in the Fifth Development Cabinet (March 21, 1988 – March 17, 1993). Subsequently, before the fall of the New Order government in 1998, he was appointed to the senior post of Chairman of the Supreme Audit Agency (Badan Permeriksaan Keuangan, or BPK).

== Career ==
=== Education ===
- Elementary School I, Blitar (1944)
- SMP, Kediri and Yogyakarta (1947)
- High School, Yogyakarta and Jakarta (1952)
- Faculty of Economics, University of Indonesia (1958)
- University of California, Berkeley, USA (MA, 1960)
- University of Pittsburgh, USA (doctorate, 1968)

=== Positions held ===
- Assistant lecturer at the Faculty of Economics, University of Indonesia (UI) (1957)
- Lecturer and later Professor of Economics UI (1960–present)
- Secretary of the Monetary Board (1970–1973)
- Deputy Head of Bappenas field of Fiscal and Monetary (1970–1973)
- Members of the Assembly (1972–1988)
- Vice Chairman of National Development Planning Agency (1973–1982)
- Chairman Opstib, concurrently Minister of State for Administrative Control (1973–1983)
- Minister of State for National Development Planning, concurrently Chairman of the National Development Planning Agency (1983–1988)
- Education Minister ad interim (1985)
- Finance Minister of Development Cabinet V (1988–1993)
- Chairman of the CPC 1993–1998
- Chairman (Independent) Asuransi Ramayana Tbk. (ASRM)

Political offices
Preceded by M. Jusuf	Chairman of the Supreme Audit Agency; 1993–1998	Succeeded by Satrio Budihardjo Joedono
Preceded by Radius Prawiro	Finance Minister; 1988–1993	Succeeded by Marie Muhammad
Preceded by Widjojo Nitisastro	Chair of the National Development Planning Agency; 1983–1988	Succeeded by Saleh Afiff
Preceded by Emil Salim	Minister of State for Administrative and Bureaucratic Reform; 1973–1983	Succeeded by Saleh Afiff
