= Wardojo =

Indonesian politician and cabinet minister (1933-2008)

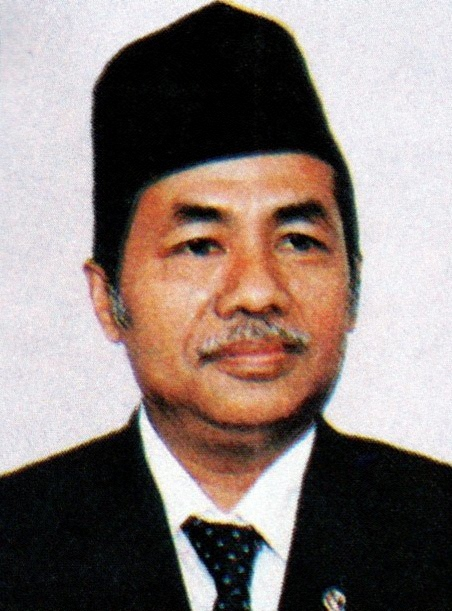
- Official portrait, 1985

19th Minister of Agriculture
- In office 21 March 1988 – 17 March 1993
- President: Suharto
- Preceded by: Achmad Affandi
- Succeeded by: Sjarifuddin Baharsjah

3rd Junior Minister of Agriculture
- In office 19 March 1983 – 17 March 1988
- President: Suharto
- Preceded by: Achmad Affandi
- Succeeded by: Ibrahim Hasan

Personal details
- Born: 20 August 1933 Klaten, Dutch East Indies
- Died: 27 July 2008 (aged 74) Jakarta, Indonesia
- Party: Golkar
- Education: Gadjah Mada University

Wardojo (EYD: Wardoyo; 20 August 1933 – 27 July 2008) was an Indonesian politician who served as the 19th Minister of Agriculture from 1988 until 1993. A member of the Golkar political party, he previously served as the 3rd Junior Minister of Agriculture from 1983 until 1988. He died on 27 July 2008, and was buried in the Kalibata Heroes' Cemetery.
