= Ali Said =

Somalian police chief

Ali Sa'id Sheik Hassan, also referred to as Ali Sa'id Hassan Awale and Ali Said (died 17 June 2009), was the chief of police of Mogadishu and a commander of security forces during the war in Somalia, in which he was killed by sniper fire in June 2009. He had been the Mogadishu chief of the Somali Police Force for roughly two years, prior to being shot by "Islamist forces" in Mogadishu's Hadan district during the Battle of Mogadishu (2009). The BBC reported that the police chief's death would be "a significant setback for the pro-government forces as he had often been on the front line encouraging his colleagues to defend their positions". The New York Times reported Somali analysts stating that "the loss of the police chief, Col. Ali Said, would be a major blow to the transitional government led by Sheik Sharif Sheik Ahmed." Ali Said had survived an earlier assassination attempt in 2007.
