= Radius Prawiro =

Indonesian economist and politician

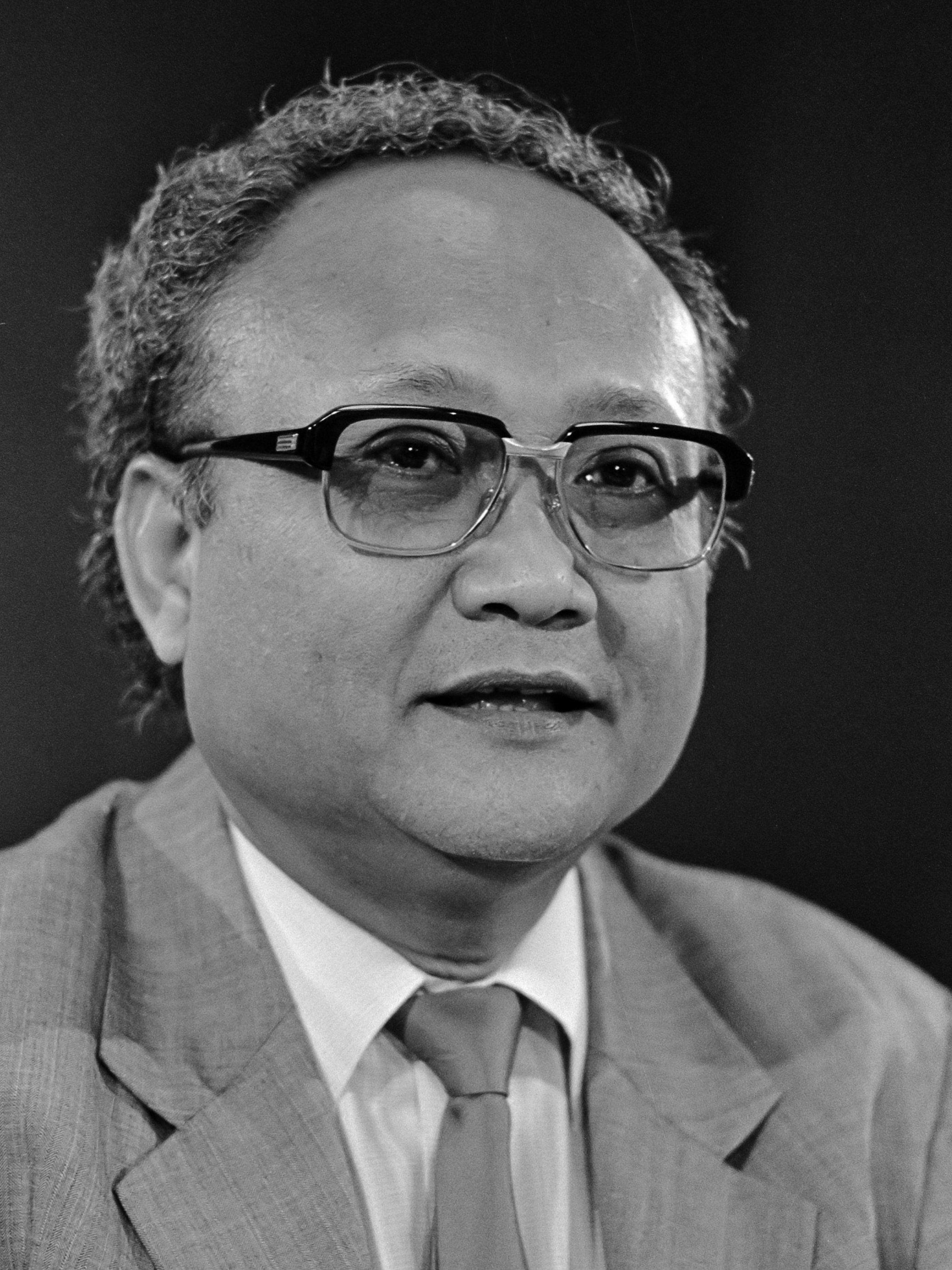
- Radius in 1983

4th Coordinating Minister for Economics, Finance, Industry and Development Supervision
- In office 23 March 1988 – 17 March 1993
- President: Suharto
- Preceded by: Ali Wardhana
- Succeeded by: Saleh Afiff

16th Minister of Finance
- In office 19 March 1983 – 21 March 1988
- President: Suharto
- Preceded by: Ali Wardhana
- Succeeded by: J. B. Sumarlin

20th Minister of Trade and Cooperatives (Note: Known as Minister of Trade until March 1978)
- In office 28 March 1973 – 19 March 1983
- President: Suharto
- Preceded by: Sumitro Djojohadikusumo
- Succeeded by: Rachmat Saleh

6th Governor of Bank Indonesia
- In office 27 March 1966 – 5 April 1973
- President: Sukarno; Suharto
- Preceded by: Jusuf Muda Dalam
- Succeeded by: Rachmat Saleh

Deputy Minister for the National Audit Office
- In office 17 March 1965 – 27 March 1966
- President: Sukarno
- Preceded by: Position established
- Succeeded by: Position abolished

Personal details
- Born: 19 September 1928 Yogyakarta, Dutch East Indies
- Died: 26 May 2005 (aged 76) Munich, Germany
- Spouse: Leonie Supit
- Education: University of Indonesia
- Profession: Economist; Politician

Radius Prawiro (29 June 1928 – 26 May 2005) was an Indonesian economist and politician.

== Education ==
The son of Suradi Prawiro, a teacher, Radius attended school in Yogyakarta. In 1942, while still at Middle School he became a cigarette vendor. After finishing school, he continued his education in the Nederlands Economische Hogeschool in Rotterdam, Netherlands. Returning to Indonesia, he completed a doctorate at the Faculty of Economics at the University of Indonesia in Jakarta.

== Career ==
His economic and political career began as the Secretary of the People's Security Committee (Badan Keamanan Rakyat) in Yogyakarta in 1945 and continued as TRI Liaison Officer (Perwira Markas Tertinggi Perhubungan TRI) in Yogyakarta from 1947 to 1948, was on the Staff of the Military Governor of the Yogyakarta from 1945 to 1951 and worked as a Technical Officer in the National Accounting Office (Pegawai Teknis Direktorat Akuntan Negara) from 1960 to 1965. He then held the position of Deputy Minister for the National Audit Office of Indonesia (Deputi Menteri Pemeriksa Keuangan Negara) (1965), Deputy Minister for the central bank (1965), Governor of the National Bank of Indonesia (1966), Governor of Bank Indonesia (1966–1973), and served concurrently as Governor of the International Monetary Fund and the Vice-Governor of the Asian Development Bank for Indonesia from 1967 to 1971.

Radius became a member of the President's Economic Experts Team, and served as Head of the Governing Committee of the World Bank (1971–1973). He was then appointed Minister of Trade in both the Second Development Cabinet and the Third Development Cabinet (1973–1983), Finance Minister in the Fourth Development Cabinet (1983–1988) and was Coordinating Minister of the Economics, Finance and Industry and Development Supervisory Board from 1993.

He recorded his views of economic policy in Indonesia in a useful book Indonesia's Struggle for Economic Development published in 1998.

== Honours ==
=== National ===
- Indonesia
  - Star of the Republic of Indonesia (3rd Class) (1998) (Indonesian: Bintang Republik Indonesia Utama)
  - Star of Mahaputera (2nd Class) (1973) (Indonesian: Bintang Mahaputera Adipradana)

=== Foreign Honours ===
- Belgium:
  - Grand Cross of the Order of Leopold II
- Japan:
  - Order of the Sacred Treasure 1st Class (1994)
- Netherlands
  - Knight Grand Cross of the Order of Orange-Nassau (1986)
- Spain:
  - Grand Cross of the Order of Civil Merit (1984)

== Notes ==
Political offices
Preceded by Ali Wardhana	Coordinating Minister for Economics, Finance, Industry and Development Supervision; 1988–1993	Succeeded by Saleh Afiff
Preceded by Ali Wardhana	Minister of Finance; 1983–1988	Succeeded by J. B. Sumarlin
Preceded by Sumitro Djojohadikusumo	Minister of Trade and Cooperatives; 1973–1983	Succeeded by Rachmat Saleh
Government offices
Preceded by Jusuf Muda Dalam	Governor of Bank Indonesia; 1966–1973	Succeeded by Rachmat Saleh
