= Widjojo Nitisastro =

Indonesian economist

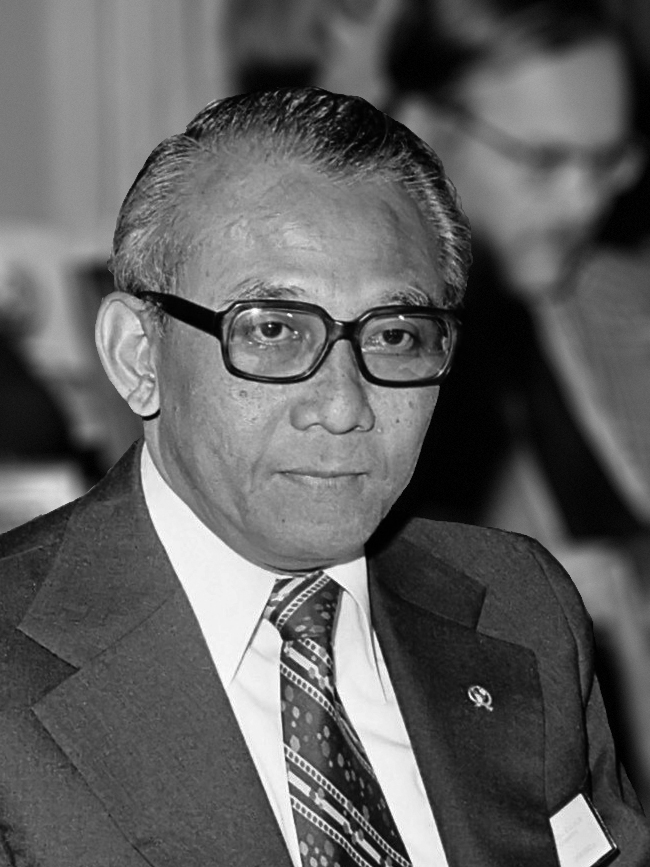
- Widjojo Nitisastro in 1977

2nd Coordinating Minister for Economics, Finance, and Industry of Indonesia
- In office 29 March 1973 – 19 March 1983
- President: Suharto
- Preceded by: Hamengkubuwono IX
- Succeeded by: Ali Wardhana

Head of National Development Planning Agency
- In office 8 June 1967 – 19 March 1983
- President: Suharto
- Preceded by: Ruslan Abdulgani
- Succeeded by: J. B. Sumarlin

Minister of State for Administrative and Bureaucratic Reform
- In office 9 September 1971 – 28 March 1973
- President: Suharto
- Preceded by: Ruslan Abdulgani
- Succeeded by: J. B. Sumarlin

Personal details
- Born: 23 September 1927 Malang, East Java, Dutch East Indies
- Died: 9 March 2012 (aged 84) Jakarta, Indonesia
- Resting place: Kalibata Heroes' Cemetery
- Party: Golkar
- Spouse: Siti Sudarsih
- Children: 2
- Education: University of Indonesia; University of California, Berkeley
- Occupation: Economist

Widjojo Nitisastro (23 September 1927 – 9 March 2012) was an Indonesian economist, who was known as the main architect of the Indonesian economy during the New Order regime of President Suharto, serving as Minister for National Development (1971–1983) and Coordinating Minister for Economy, Finance and Industry (1973–1983). He was one of Indonesia's best-known and most respected economic policy-makers, both within Indonesia and overseas.

He joined the Indonesian Student Army during the Indonesian National Revolution and fought in Surabaya. After the end of the revolution, he taught at a junior high school, before, attending and later graduating from the University of Indonesia. He would go on to become a professor at the university.

In the late 1960s, after the fall of President Sukarno, he became one of Indonesia's most important economic policy-makers under the New Order regime of President Suharto. He was generally considered to be the foremost member of the well-known 'Berkeley Mafia' group of economists.

== Early life, military service, and education ==
=== Early life and military service ===
Widjojo Nitisastro was born in Malang Residency, on 23 September 1927, and grew up in Surabaya. He came from a retired elementary school superintendent's family. His father was an activist with the Greater Indonesia Party (Parindra). In 1945, when the Indonesian National Revolution erupted, Widjojo joined the Indonesian Student Army (TRIP). In the Revolution, he almost died somewhere between the Ngaglik and Gunung Sari areas of Surabaya.

=== Education ===
==== University of Indonesia ====
After the end of the revolution, Widjojo taught at a junior high school for 3 years. He then continued his higher education at the Faculty of Economics of the University of Indonesia (UI), specializing in the field of demography. While still a student, he, together with Canadian demographer Nathan Keyfiz, wrote a book entitled "The Problem of Indonesian Population and Development." The foreword was written by former Vice President Mohammad Hatta, who wrote, "An Indonesian son with his knowledge of the problems of his homeland, has been able to work with Canadian statisticians. Processing his solid thoughts and putting them into a weighty book." Widjojo eventually graduated with the Cum Laude predicate. He would later be appointed by the Dean of the Faculty of Economics (and future Minister of Research), Sumitro Djojohadikusumo, as the Director of the Institute for Economic and Community Research. Widjojo Nitisastro later became a full professor of economics at the University of Indonesia in Jakarta at the age of 34 in 1962.

==== University of California, Berkeley ====
Shortly after, Widjojo continued his doctoral studies at the University of California, Berkeley. He worked on a dissertation entitled “Migration, Population Growth, and Economic Development: A Study of the Economic Consequences of Alternative Patterns of Inter-Island Migration.” There, Widjojo met several other economic students, including future ministers Mohammad Sadli, Subroto, Ali Wardhana, and Emil Salim. This group would later become known as the Berkeley Mafia, a group of technocrats who are considered to have instilled neoliberalism in economics for the sake of American interests in Indonesia.

After completing his studies, Widjojo returned to Indonesia.

== Career ==
=== Professor at the University of Indonesia ===
When he returned, Indonesia was under the guided democracy period of President Sukarno. Under this policy, the Indonesian economy leaned towards economic socialism/communism. The economic situation in Indonesia at that time was chaotic, with high inflation rates and high prices. Widjojo expressed his opinion to the government to change the paradigm of the Indonesian economy. During his inauguration as a professor of economics at the University of Indonesia on August 10, 1963, Widjojo read a speech entitled "Economic Analysis and Development Planning." He suggested that economic analysis should be included in government policymaking, as well as a combination of market mechanisms and government intervention instead of allowing the market to be too free or otherwise making the government too powerful. However, his suggestions were not heard by the government.

=== "Berkeley Mafia" ===
In 1966, General Suharto took over power in Indonesia from President Sukarno through the Supersemar order. Although he did not become president for the next two years, Suharto began to build the foundations of the government that would later be referred to as the New Order regime. In August 1966, Suharto held a military seminar, which was attended by Widjojo and a number of his colleagues.

In the seminar, the economists presented their ideas and policy recommendations to Suharto. Suharto was impressed by their idea and asked them to work as a Team of Experts in Economics and Finance. This appointment marked the beginning of Widjojo's career. Other members of the group, all senior Indonesian economists, were generally regarded to include Professor Ali Wardhana, Professor Moh. Sadli, Professor Emil Salim, and Professor Subroto. Later, in 1970, he and several other economists who graduated from the University of California, Berkeley were accused of being the Berkeley Mafia formed by the CIA to instill economic liberalism in Indonesia.

=== Political career ===
==== Minister for National Development Planning ====
In 1971, Widjojo was appointed State Minister for National Development Planning, a position he held until the early 1980s. As minister, he and his colleagues in the 'Berkeley mafia' used a neo-Keynesian approach to balance the state budget, control the money supply, re-establish the position of financial institutions, and open the door as wide as possible for foreign investors.

While leading the ministry, Widjojo made an economic plan that was contained in the Five-Year Development Plan. Economist Mudrajad Kuncoro, who is a professor of Economics at Gadjah Mada University, in his column in the Gatra magazine, said that the focus of the Five-Year Development Plan was macroeconomics. In the New Order, the Minister for National Development Planning became a crucial institution because it held the key to development at both the central and regional levels. The system worked as it adheres to centralized planning, both in terms of policy and funding. With this flow, regional development is more prominent because both planning and implementation are “centralized.”

==== Other positions ====
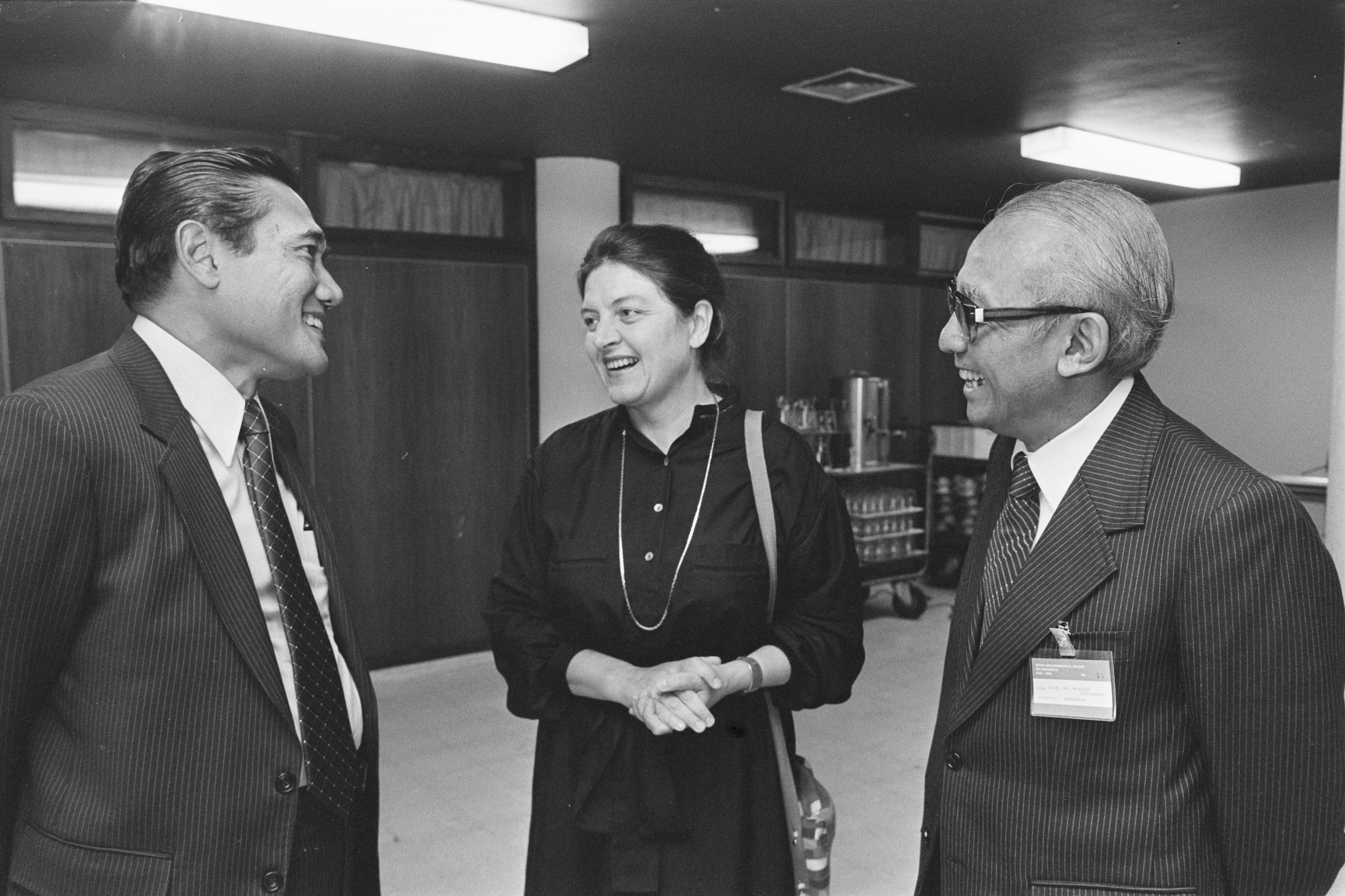
Widjojo Nitisastro (right) at an IGGI meeting in The Hague in June 1983 with Ministers Ali Wardhana (left) and Eegje Schoo (Netherlands).

During his career in government, Widjojo was the head of many Indonesian delegations to numerous international meetings such as the Inter-Governmental Group on Indonesia (IGGI), the Paris Club, and World Bank and International Monetary Fund (IMF) meetings. He was also a member of the South Commission (headed by President Julius Nyerere) as well as numerous other international committees). Widjojo also served as Coordinating Minister for Economy, Finance, and Industry from 1973 until 1983. In 2008, the Faculty of Economics at the University of Indonesia awarded Widjojo its most prestigious award, the Wirakarya Adhitama, for a lifetime of dedication and extraordinary achievements.

=== Post-New Order ===
After the fall of Suharto in 1998, Vice President B. J. Habibie became president. Habibie and Widjojo had two conflicting views on economics, and Widjojo's role in the Indonesian economy was not as strong as it used to be under Habibie. However, during the Abdurrahman Wahid administration, he was trusted to lead the Indonesian Economic Team at the Paris Club meeting in mid-April 2000 to discuss rescheduling the repayment of Indonesia's debt for the period April 2000 – March 2002 amounting to US$ 5.9 billion.

== Retirement ==
After retirement, Widjojo lived quietly in Jakarta. He did not publish widely during his period in government preferring to work directly with his colleagues and President Suharto. In 2010 a collection of some of his main reports and speeches during his period as an adviser was published as Pengalaman Pembangunan Indonesia (The Indonesian Development Experience). In the collection, he discussed a wide range of issues relating to economic policy in Indonesia during the period 1965-1997 as well as providing details of the way the government responded to several key economic crises in the 1970s. This book was published in English in 2011 as The Indonesian Development Experience: A Collection of Writings and Speeches. The English-language version was launched at the Faculty of Economics, University of Indonesia, on 23 September 2011.

== Death ==
Widjojo died on 9 March 2012 in Jakarta. His funeral service was held the same day at the Sunda Kelapa mosque in Menteng, Jakarta. His role as a major policy-maker in Indonesia was recognised at an official ceremony in the Planning Bureau (Bappenas) following the service. In paying tribute to Widjojo's legacy, President Susilo Bambang Yudhoyono said that Widjojo had been a leading architect of 'New Order' economic policies and that many of his ideas had formed the cornerstone of economic policy in Indonesia. After lying in state for a few hours in Bappenas to provide an opportunity for mourners, including President Susilo Bambang Yudhoyono, to pay their respects, Widjojo was buried at Kalibata Heroes' Cemetery in South Jakarta at a ceremony led by Vice President Boediono.

== Later recognition ==
In October 2012, Widjojo was recognised as the "father of Indonesian demography" during a seminar at the 62nd anniversary of the Economics Faculty, University of Indonesia. Professor Subroto, an economics professor and a colleague of Widjojo in government, said that through his work Widjojo had placed the Indonesian people at the heart of development policy in Indonesia. The seminar was organised by the Institute of Demography within the Economics Faculty at the university.

== See also ==
- Berkeley Mafia
- Ali Wardhana
- New Order
