= Emil Salim =

Indonesian economist and politician

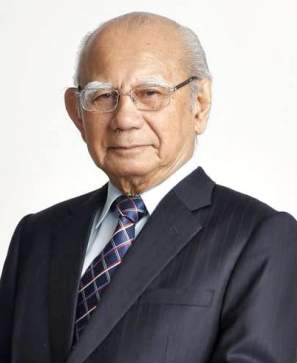
- Official portrait, 2021

3rd Chairperson of the Presidential Advisory Council
- In office 25 January 2010 – 20 October 2014
- President: Susilo Bambang Yudhoyono
- Preceded by: T. B. Silalahi
- Succeeded by: Sri Adiningsih

Personal details
- Born: 8 June 1930 (age 96) Lahat, South Sumatra, Dutch East Indies
- Party: Golkar
- Spouse: Roosminnie Roza (m. 1958; died 2021)
- Children: 2
- Relatives: Agus Salim (uncle)
- Education: University of Indonesia; University of California

Emil Salim (born 8 June 1930) is an Indonesian economist and former politician. He was born to Minangkabau parents, who were both from the village of Koto Gadang in West Sumatra. His uncle was Agus Salim, one of the founding fathers of the Republic of Indonesia and Minister of Foreign Affairs in the early 1950s.

Salim graduated from the Faculty of Economics of the University of Indonesia in 1959. He obtained a PhD in economics from the University of California, Berkeley, and returned to Indonesia to a teaching position at the Faculty of Economics of the University of Indonesia in 1964. He became one of the well-known group of 'Berkeley Mafia' economic advisers, working closely with Professor Widjojo Nitisastro. In 1977 he was appointed to the position of professor of economic development at the University of Indonesia.

Salim has held a number of government positions, including:

- 1966: member of the team of economic advisers to President Suharto
- 1967-68: member of the team of advisers to the Minister of Manpower.
- 1967-1969: chairman of the technical team of the Council for Economic Stability and a member of the Gotong Royong Parliament.
- 1969: vice chairman of Bappenas (the National Development Planning Agency)
- 1971: Minister of State for the Improvement of the State Apparatus.
- 1973-1978: Minister of Transportation
- 1978-1983: Minister of State for Development Supervision and the Environment
- 1983-1993: Minister of State for Population and the Environment
- 2007-2010: member of the advisory council to President Yudhoyono, as the adviser for environment and sustainable development issues
- 2010-2014: chairperson, the advisory council to President Yudhoyono
- 2021-now: Member of the Governing Board at National Research and Innovation Agency.

Salim has chaired the Foundation for Sustainable Development and the Kehati Foundation, and co-chaired the United States-Indonesia Society. He is a member of the Association of Indonesian Moslem Intellectuals.

== Extractive Industries Review ==
In July 2001, the World Bank launched an independent inquiry called the Extractive Industries Review (EIR). The review was headed by Salim. Salim held consultations with a wide range of stakeholders in 2002 and 2003. The EIR recommendations were published in January 2004 in a final report entitled Striking a Better Balance. The report concluded that fossil fuel and mining projects do not alleviate poverty and recommended that World Bank involvement with these sectors be phased out by 2008 to be replaced by investment in renewable energy and clean energy. The World Bank published its Management Response to the EIR in September 2004. The EIR served to alter the World Bank's policies on oil, gas and mining. Following the EIR process, the World Bank also issued a revised Policy on Indigenous Peoples.
