= Sudharmono =

Vice President of Indonesia from 1988 to 1993

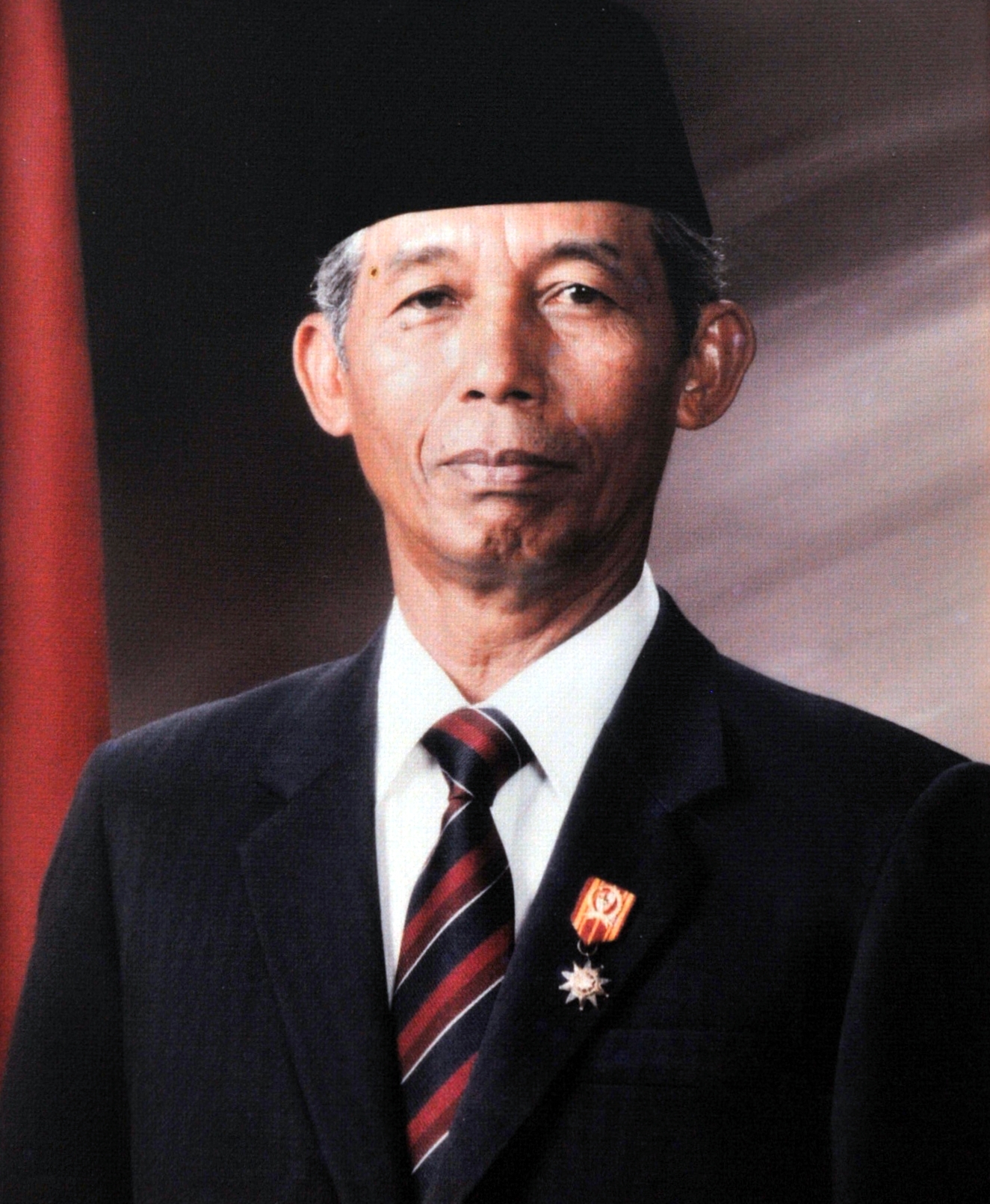
- Official portrait, 1988

5th Vice President of Indonesia
- In office 11 March 1988 – 11 March 1993
- President: Suharto
- Preceded by: Umar Wirahadikusumah
- Succeeded by: Try Sutrisno

4th General Chairman of Golkar
- In office 25 October 1983 – 25 October 1988
- Preceded by: Amir Murtono
- Succeeded by: Wahono

Ministerial roles
- 1966–1968: Secretariat of the Cabinet
- 1972–1988: State Minister/State Secretary
- 1973–1980: Secretariat of the Cabinet
- 1977–1978: Acting Minister of Information
- 1982–1983: Minister of Home Affairs

Personal details
- Born: 12 March 1927 Grissee, Dutch East Indies
- Died: 25 January 2006 (aged 78) Jakarta, Indonesia
- Resting place: Kalibata Heroes' Cemetery
- Party: Golkar
- Spouse: Ratu Emma Norma (m. 1951)
- Occupation: Politician; army officer
- Nickname: Pak Dar

Military service
- Allegiance: Indonesia
- Branch/service: Indonesian Army
- Years of service: 1945–1968
- Rank: Lieutenant general
- Commands: Ronggolawe Division; Supreme Operations
- Battles/wars: Indonesian National Revolution; Operation Dwikora
- Service no.: 16078

Sudharmono (EVO: Soedharmono; 12 March 1927 – 25 January 2006), also known by his nickname Pak Dar, was an Indonesian Army officer and politician who served as the fifth vice president of Indonesia from 1988 until 1993 under the New Order regime. Previously, he served in several positions in the government and military, including as the Chairman of Golkar, State Secretary of Indonesia, and a lieutenant general in the army.

Sudharmono was born on 12 March 1927, in Gresik, East Java. He completed his Middle School education in 1945. Following the Proclamation of Indonesian Independence, he dropped out from any further education to join the army in the Indonesian National Revolution. He became the Commander of the Ronggolawe Division in the army, a position which he held throughout the war. After the Dutch retreated from Indonesia in 1949, Sudharmono completed his Secondary education before going to Jakarta in 1952 to join the Military Law Academy, which he completed the course in 1956. He then served in Medan, North Sumatra, as an Army Attorney from 1957 to 1961. He remained in the army until 1968 and served in the Indonesia–Malaysia confrontation and the Supreme Operations Command (KOTI).

Following the Fall of Sukarno, after the 30 September Movement, and after the rise of Suharto, Sudharmono left the army after being named Cabinet Secretary as well as Chairman of the Economic Stability Council by Suharto. In 1970, Sudharmono was moved from the position of Cabinet Secretary to the State Secretary, a position which allowed him to assist Suharto in the day-to-day running of the government. At the 1983 Golkar National Conference, with Suharto's support, Sudharmono was elected as the Chairman of Golkar. In 1988, during the election of vice president at the General Assembly of the People's Consultative Assembly (MPR), he was elected as vice president to accompany Suharto.

As vice president, Sudharmono was extremely active in governing. Despite this, however, the military showed their displeasure at Sudharmono's election as vice president, as he represented the civil and bureaucratic wing of Golkar. This culminated in March 1993, during the General Assembly of the MPR, where the army nominated Try Sutrisno as vice president without the consent of Suharto. Although Suharto was likely displeased, Suharto did not want an open conflict with the military deputies and accepted Try as his vice president. Following the end of his term, he published two books, both autobiographies. In May 1998, on the eve of Suharto's fall, Sudharmono, together with former vice presidents Umar Wirahadikusumah, and Try Sutrisno, visited Suharto at his residence to discuss possible options. Sudharmono died on 25 January 2006, after being treated at Metropolitan Medical Center hospital. His body was interred in the Kalibata Heroes' Cemetery, Jakarta.

== Early life and education ==
Sudharmono was born on 12 March 1927 in Cerme village, Gresik, East Java, Dutch East Indies (now Indonesia). His father was Soepijo Wirodiredjo, the son of a carik (secretary) of the Village of Kabalan, in Kanor District, Bojonegoro, who began his career as an intern at the Balen District office. His mother was Raden Nganten Sukarsi, the daughter of a priyayi from Bojonegoro. He was the third child of four children. He had an older sister, Siti, and an older brother, Sunar. When he was two years old, his father moved to Tuban, Central Java to become a clerk at the local government. His mother died while giving birth to Sudharmono's fourth and youngest sibling. Six months later, his father died of an illness after a few months of being treated in Surabaya. Before he died, his father had been moved back to Tambakrejo, Bojonegoro.

Following the death of both of his parents, Sudharmono moved from Surabaya to Jombang. During his time in Jombang, Sudharmono went to live with an uncle, who was a clerk at the local government. He then moved to Wringinanom (in Gresik) and then to Rembang. In Rembang, he lived with his maternal grandmother, Mbah Putri. He began his elementary school education at the Hollandsch-Inlandsche School (HIS). At HIS, he was accelerated by his teacher from the first grade straight to the third grade. He then continued his education in Semarang, Central Java, where he majored in exact sciences. His education was cut short, however, with the arrival of the Japanese in 1942.

== Military service ==
Following the Proclamation of Indonesian Independence, he dropped out of further education to join the army in the Indonesian National Revolution. There, he assisted in collecting weapons from the Japanese troops in preparation for the formation of an Indonesian Army. He later became the Commander of the Ronggolawe Division, a position which he held throughout the war against the returning Dutch troops. During the war, he took part in the guerilla war against the Dutch around Wonosobo and Magelang. After the Dutch retreated from Indonesia in 1949, he completed his Secondary Education before going to Jakarta in 1952 to join the Military Law Academy course, which he completed in 1956. It was around this time that he befriended then-military officer Leonardus Benjamin Moerdani.

Sudharmono then served in Medan, North Sumatra as an Army Attorney from 1957 to 1961. In 1962, Sudharmono received his degree in law after completing a course at Military Law University. After this, Sudharmono was appointed chairman of the Central Government Personnel Orders Unit and provided administrative assistance to the government. During the Indonesia–Malaysia confrontation, President Sukarno formed the Supreme Operations Command (KOTI), which was a war command immediately under Sukarno's control. In 1963, Sudharmono joined KOTI and was given the role of Joint Centre Operations Member for the Supreme Operations.

In October 1965, following the 30 September Movement, Major General Suharto was appointed Army Commander and joined KOTI as the organizations Chief of Staff. Suharto went on to form a relationship with Sudharmono during these tense times in Indonesian history and it was evident that Sudharmono earned Suharto's trust. On 11 March 1966, when Suharto received the Emergency Powers from Sukarno, Sudharmono was the one who reproduced copies of the letter to be distributed to other military officers. The next day, on 12 March 1966, Sudharmono was also the one to write the decree banning the Indonesian Communist Party (PKI).

== State secretary ==
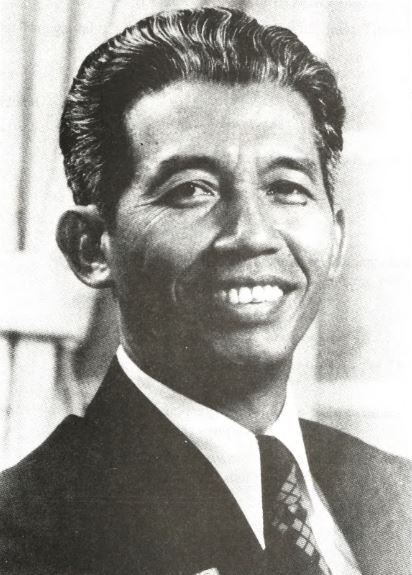
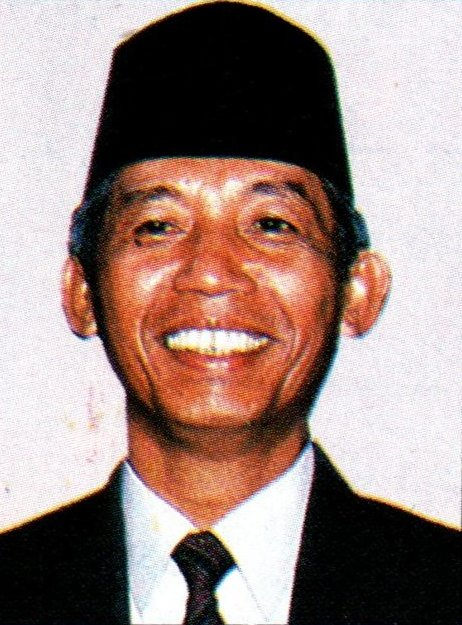
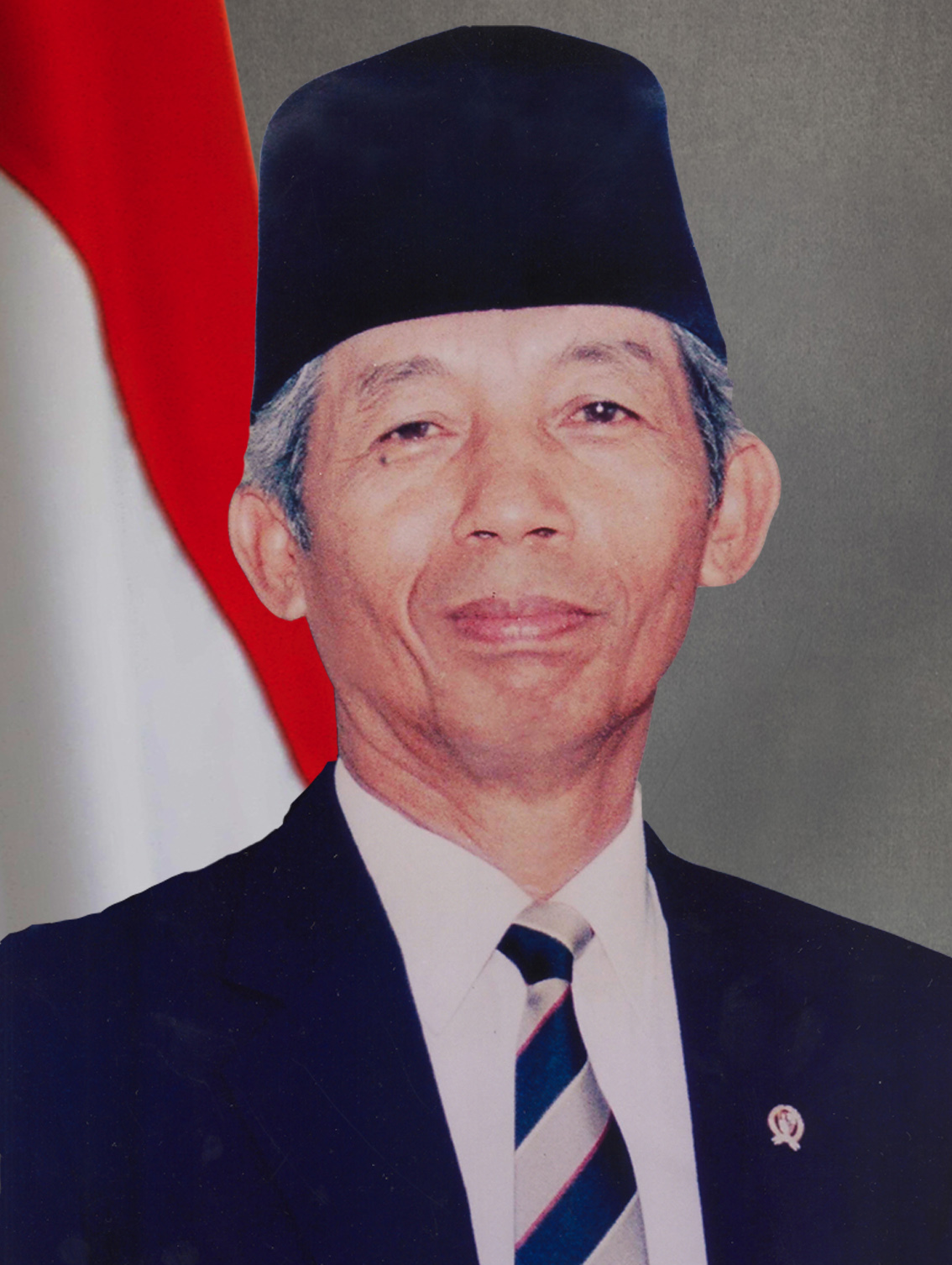
Portraits of Sudharmono while a minister in the New Order government; the first portrait was him as minister of home affairs, while the last two were portraits of him as state secretary.

KOTI was disbanded by Suharto in 1968, but Sudharmono, likely due to his administrative skills and the trust that he had earned from Suharto, became the Cabinet Secretary as well as Chairman of the Economic Stability Council. In 1970, Sudharmono was moved from the position of Cabinet Secretary to the position of State Secretary, a position which allowed him to assist Suharto in the day-to-day running of the government. Whilst State Secretary, Sudharmono also covered for other ministers when they were unable to perform their duties; with short stints as Interim Information Minister and Interim Home Affairs Minister as well as helping to produce Suharto's accountability speech before the People's Consultative Assembly (MPR). In 1980, Sudharmono's position as State Secretary received a significant boost through a presidential decision that gave the State Secretary the power to supervise government purchases exceeding 500 million Rupiahs.

== Chairman of Golkar ==
During the 1983 Golkar National Conference, which took place from 20 October until 25 October 1983, Sudharmono was elected as the Chairman of Golkar. His election was unexpected. He was accompanied by Sarwono Kusumaatmadja as secretary general. As Chairman of Golkar, Sudharmono reformed some of the inner workings of the party. He did this by pushing for further transparency within the party organization, creating job descriptions for party officials, dividing the tasks of party officials, and creating the post of field coordinator. Sudharmono also conducted many inspection tours of Golkar branches at the local level to see the implementation and consolidation of Golkar policies.

Sudharmono consolidated Golkar's position ahead of the 1987 Indonesian legislative election, focusing its efforts on securing a majority of the popular vote in the devoutly Islamic province of Aceh, which was the only province apart from Jakarta where Golkar had failed to do so in 1982. Golkar made use of two civil servants to run its financial campaign in Aceh, while also using Aceh governor Ibrahim Hasan, an economist who managed to unite the traditional and modern aspirations of the Acehnese people to their advantage by making him travel all around the province telling people that a Golkar victory would bring about material development without sacrificing traditional values.

Sudharmono's leadership, as well as the weakness of the Islamic opposition, the United Development Party, following the withdrawal of the Nahdlatul Ulama (NU) from the party, led to Golkar increasing its majority from 242 seats to 299 seats and from 64.34% to 73.11% of the vote. Golkar also achieved its aim in Aceh, and for the first time won an absolute majority of the vote in Jakarta and every other province of Indonesia.

== Vice presidency (1988–1993) ==
=== Nomination ===
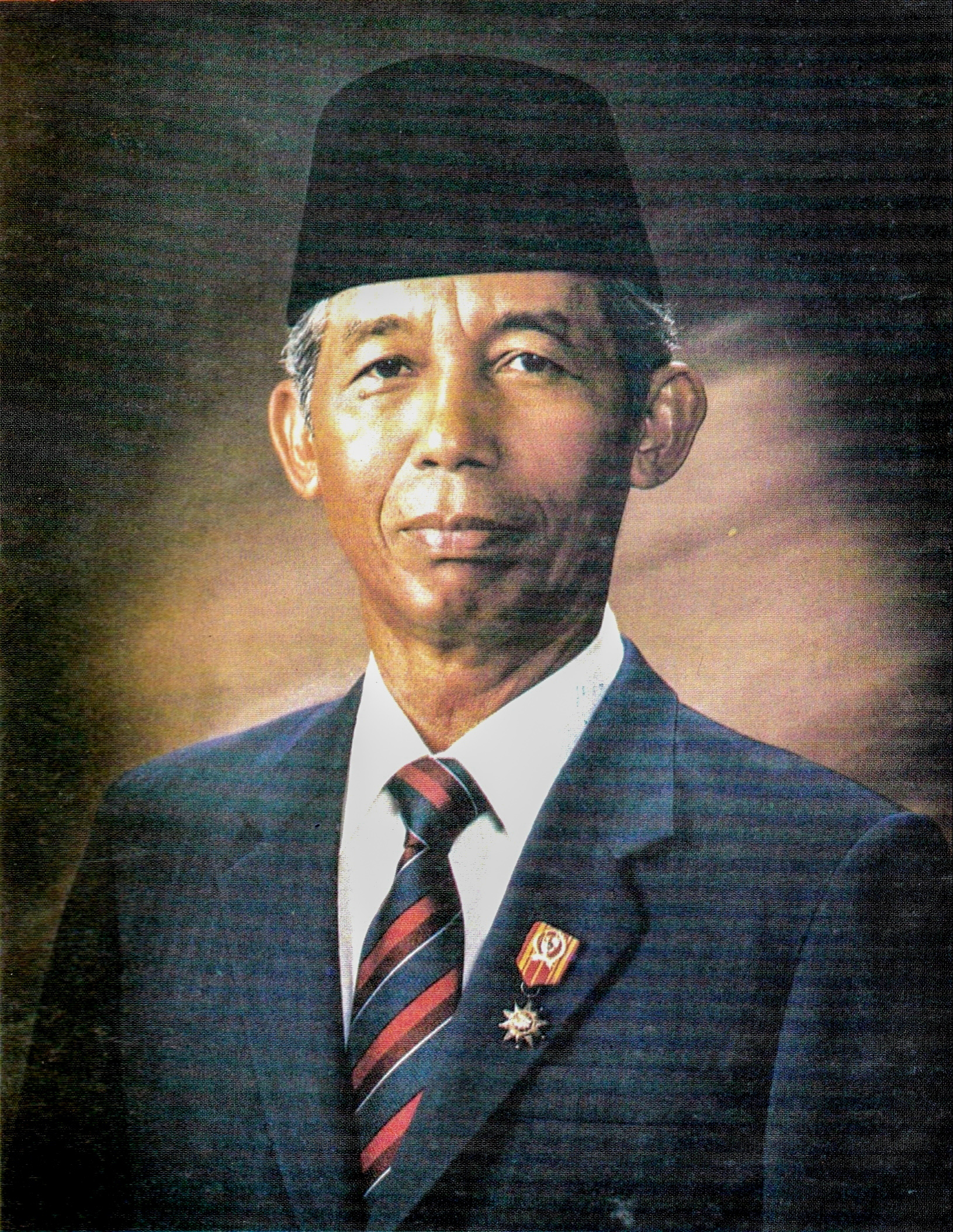
A different version of his official portrait as vice president

As the People's Consultative Assembly (MPR) convened for its 1988 General Session, it was widely believed by many that the aging Suharto would be elected to his fifth and last term as president. As such, the office of vice president became a crucial position. Suharto then created a nine-person commission to select a name for the vice presidency. Figures in the commission included Akbar Tandjung and Sarwono Kusumaatmadja. As 1988 began, Suharto began to show signs that he wanted Sudharmono to become his vice president, although Suharto never mentioned Sudharmono by name. However, the possibility of Sudharmono becoming vice president displeased many in the Armed Forces (ABRI). Although Sudharmono himself was a soldier and had ended his career with the rank of Lieutenant General, he was disliked by many in the military because he had spent much of his career behind the desk instead of leading troops on the ground.

Suharto was aware of this and, before the ABRI could do anything, placed ABRI commander Benny Moerdani as Minister of Defense and Security, a position which had no direct line of command to the troops, replacing him with Try Sutrisno, who had been Suharto's adjutant. When the nomination was finally taken up through the official channels within Golkar, the Bureaucrats and Functional factions unanimously agreed to nominate Sudharmono as vice president. While the ABRI faction's nomination was delayed, Benny Moerdani continued to procrastinate by claiming that he had not discussed the vice-presidential nomination yet. Rumors that Sudharmono was a communist were spread by ABRI, accusing him of being a member of Pesindo (Pemuda Sosialis Indonesia), a youth socialist organization.

At the General Session itself, which lasted from 1–11 March 1988, controversy continued to dog Sudharmono's nomination as vice president. First, Brigadier General Ibrahim Saleh interrupted the session and launched a scathing attack against Sudharmono before he was taken down from the podium by other MPR members. Then, Sarwo Edhie Wibowo, a general who had helped Suharto get to power in the mid-1960s resigned from both his MPR and People's Representative Council (DPR) seat in protest. Finally, United Development Party Chairman, Jailani Naro nominated himself as vice president, presumably with the private backing of ABRI, who in public supported Sudharmono's nomination; ABRI's support was likely only in opposition to Sudharmono. The chaos of the session resulted in the intervention by Suharto. He cited a decision that the MPR made in 1973 that one of the criteria for a vice president was that he should be able to work with the President. Suharto also conducted discussions with Naro and convinced him to withdraw the nomination. With Naro out of the way, Sudharmono was elected vice president.

=== Tenure ===
As vice president, Sudharmono was reported to be extremely active in governing. He issued a policy to form Tromol Pos 5000 as a means of monitoring the community and he began to consolidate politics by visiting the provinces, departments (ministries), State Offices, and other institutions. He also held a Supervision Coordination Meeting annually. Meanwhile, ABRI continued to show their displeasure at Sudharmono's election as vice president. At the Golkar National Conference in 1988, which occurred from 20–25 October 1988, to elect a new chairman, ABRI got their revenge against Sudharmono when they secured the election of Wahono as chairman. The election of Wahono as chairman was the first time in which ABRI demonstrated their political power against Suharto, and resulted in the comeback of ABRI into the Golkar political machine, as the civil and bureaucratic wing of the party (the main supporters of Sudharmono) floundered.

Ahead of the MPR's 1993 General Session, before any other maneuver by any other faction within the MPR, ABRI had already made its move. Two weeks before the session, the chairman of the ABRI faction of Golkar, Harsudiono Hartas, announced that ABRI had nominated Try Sutrisno as vice president. This nomination blindsided Suharto, Sudharmono, and even Try Sutrisno himself, who was not notified of his nomination. In theory, MPR faction members were allowed to nominate their candidates for vice president. But in practice, there was an unwritten rule, where factions had to wait for the president to nominate his chosen candidate.

Members from the United Development Party (PPP) and the Indonesian Democratic Party (PDI) quickly approved of Try's nomination, while Golkar struggled to tell its members that Golkar had not nominated Try as vice president. Suharto was furious that ABRI had pre-empted him, but did not want an open dispute with its delegation in the assembly. This led to an uneasy truce, where Suharto accepted Try as vice president. It has been speculated that, if Try Sutrisno hadn't been nominated, then Suharto would've chosen either Sudharmono or B. J. Habibie as vice president.

== Post-vice presidency and death (1993–2006) ==
Following the end of his term as vice president, Sudharmono returned to private life. In 1997, Sudharmono released his autobiography, Pengalaman Dalam Masa Pengabdian ("Experiences During Time of Service"). Concurrently, a book was also released called Kesan dan Kenangan dari Teman: 70 Tahun H. Sudharmono SH ("Impressions and Memories from Colleagues: 70 Years of Sudharmono"), which talked about Sudharmono from the point of view of those who he had worked with. Due to the close release of his books and the 1998 MPR General session, there were rumors of him planning a political comeback. In May 1998, on the eve of Suharto's fall, Sudharmono, together with former vice presidents Umar Wirahadikusumah, and Try Sutrisno, visited Suharto at his residence to discuss possible options. During the years after the fall of Suharto, he was trusted to coordinate the seven foundations established by the Cendana family, namely Dharmais, Supersemar, Dakap, Damandiri, Amal Bhakti Muslim Pancasila, Gotong Royong, and Trikora.

Sudharmono died on 25 January 2006 at around 19:40 Western Indonesia Time, after having been undergoing treatment for two weeks at the Intensive Care Unit of the Metropolitan Medical Center (MMC) Hospital in Jakarta since 10 January 2006. He died due to a lung infection and complications from respiratory failure. He was buried before the Zuhur prayer at around 10:00 the next day at the Kalibata Heroes' Cemetery, Jakarta. Then-president Susilo Bambang Yudhoyono acted as inspector of funeral ceremonies.

== Honours ==
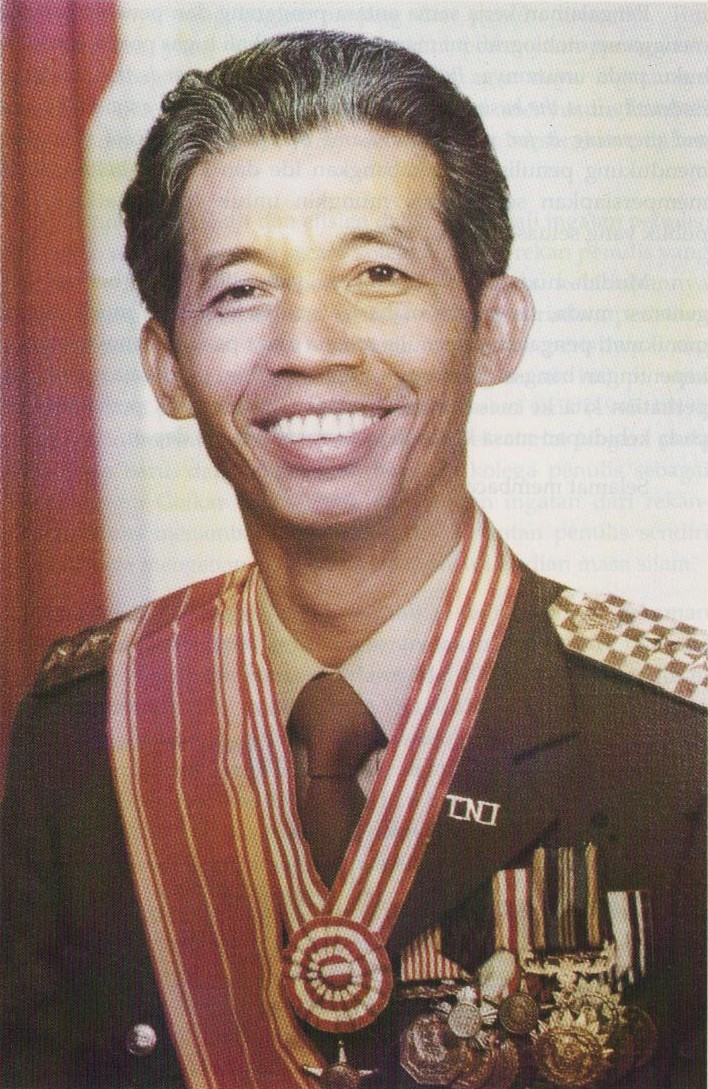
Sudharmono in military uniform

=== National ===
- Indonesia :
  - Star of the Republic of Indonesia, 2nd Class (Indonesian: Bintang Republik Indonesia Adipradana) (29 March 1988)
  - Star of Mahaputera, 1st Class (Indonesian: Bintang Mahaputera Adipurna) (29 March 1988)
  - Star of Mahaputera, 2nd Class (Indonesian: Bintang Mahaputera Adipradana) (10 March 1973)
  - Military Distinguished Service Star (Indonesian: Bintang Dharma)
  - Guerrilla Star (Indonesian: Bintang Gerilya)
  - Star of Jalasena, 2nd Class (Indonesian: Bintang Jalasena Pratama)
  - Star of Swa Bhuwana Paksa, 2nd Class (Indonesian: Bintang Swa Bhuwana Paksa Pratama)
  - Star of Kartika Eka Paksi, 3rd Class (Indonesian: Bintang Kartika Eka Paksi Nararya)
  - Indonesian Armed Forces "8 Years" Service Star (Indonesian: Bintang Sewindu Angkatan Perang Republik Indonesia)
  - Military Long Service Medal, 24 Years Service (Indonesian: Satyalancana Kesetiaan XXIV Tahun)
  - 1st Independence War Medal (Indonesian: Satyalancana Perang Kemerdekaan I)
  - 2nd Independence War Medal (Indonesian: Satyalancana Perang Kemerdekaan II)
  - Military Operational Service Medal for Madiun 1947 (Indonesian: Satyalancana G.O.M I)
  - Military Operational Service Medal for Angkatan Ratu Adil 1947 (Indonesian: Satyalancana G.O.M II)
  - "Sapta Marga" Medal (Indonesian: Satyalancana Sapta Marga)
  - Military Service Medal for Irian Jaya 1962 (Indonesian: Satyalancana Satya Dharma)
  - Northern Borneo Military Campaign Medal (Indonesian: Satyalancana Wira Dharma)
  - Medal for Combat Against Communists (Indonesian: Satyalancana Penegak)
  - Role Model Medal (Indonesian: Satyalancana Wira Karya)

=== Foreign honours ===
- Austria
  - Grand Decoration of Honour in Silver with Sash of the Decoration of Honour for Services to the Republic of Austria
- Belgium
  - Grand Cross of the Order of Leopold II
- Cambodia
  - Grand Officer of the Royal Order of Sahametrei
- Egypt
  - First Class of the Order of the Republic
- (Ethiopian Empire) Ethiopia:
  - Commander of the Order of Menelik II
- France
  - Grand Cross of the National Order of Merit
- Germany
  - Grand Cross of the Order of Merit of the Federal Republic of Germany
  - Knight Commander of the Order of Merit of the Federal Republic of Germany
- Italy
  - Knight Grand Cross of the Order of Merit of the Italian Republic
- Japan
  - Grand Cordon of the Order of the Rising Sun (1997)
- Jordan
  - Grand Cordon of the Order of the Star of Jordan
- Kuwait
  - Order of Kuwait (1st Class)
- Malaysia
  - Honorary Companions of the Order of the Defender of the Realm (J.M.N.)
- Netherlands
  - Knight Grand Cross of the Order of Orange-Nassau
- Philippines
  - Officer of the Order of Sikatuna, Rank of Maginoo (OS)
- Qatar
  - First Class of the Order of Merit
- Saudi Arabia
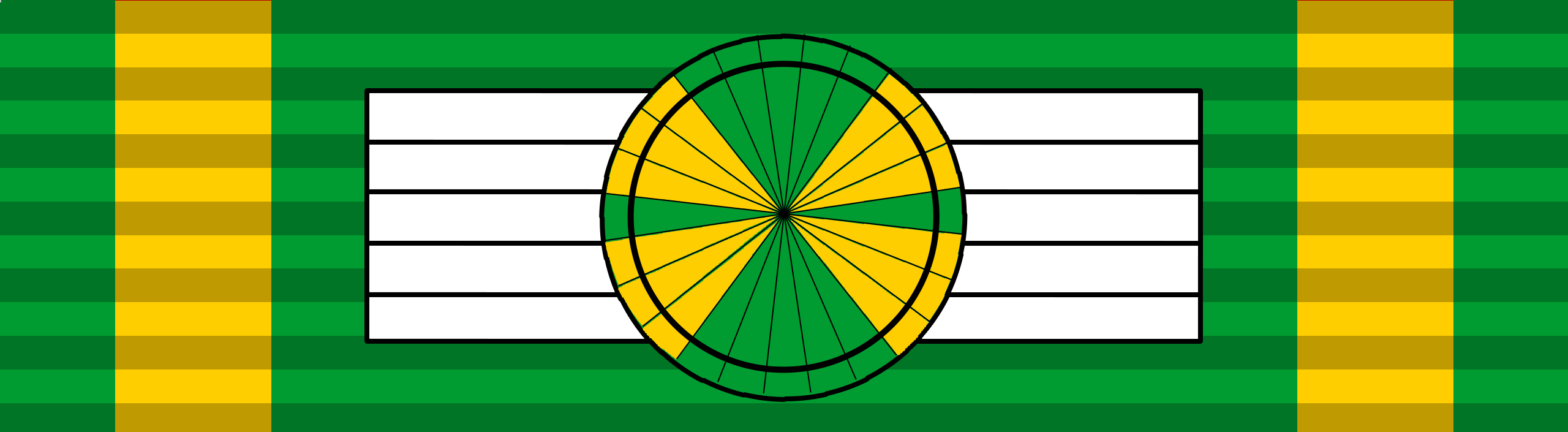
  - Third Class of the Order of Abdulaziz al Saud
- South Korea
  - Gwanghwa Medal of the Order of Diplomatic Service Merit
- Syria
  - First Class of the Order of Civil Merit of the Syrian Arab Republic
- Thailand
  - Knight Grand Cross (First Class) of the Most Exalted Order of the White Elephant (K.C.E.)
- Yugoslavia
  - Order of the Yugoslav Flag with Sash (1975)

=== Possibility as president ===
According to historian, author, and academic, Robert Elson, in his book Suharto: A Political Biography, Suharto groomed Sudharmono to be his ideal successor. However, the selection of Sudharmono as vice president caused a rift between the civil and military factions in Golkar. Though Sudharmono himself was a soldier and had ended his career with the rank of Lieutenant General, he was disliked by the military because he had spent much of his career behind the desk instead of leading troops on the ground. This, along with the military's backlash against Sudharmono during the 1988 MPR general session, resulted in Suharto raising B. J. Habibie as his protege, instead of Sudharmono.

== Personal life ==
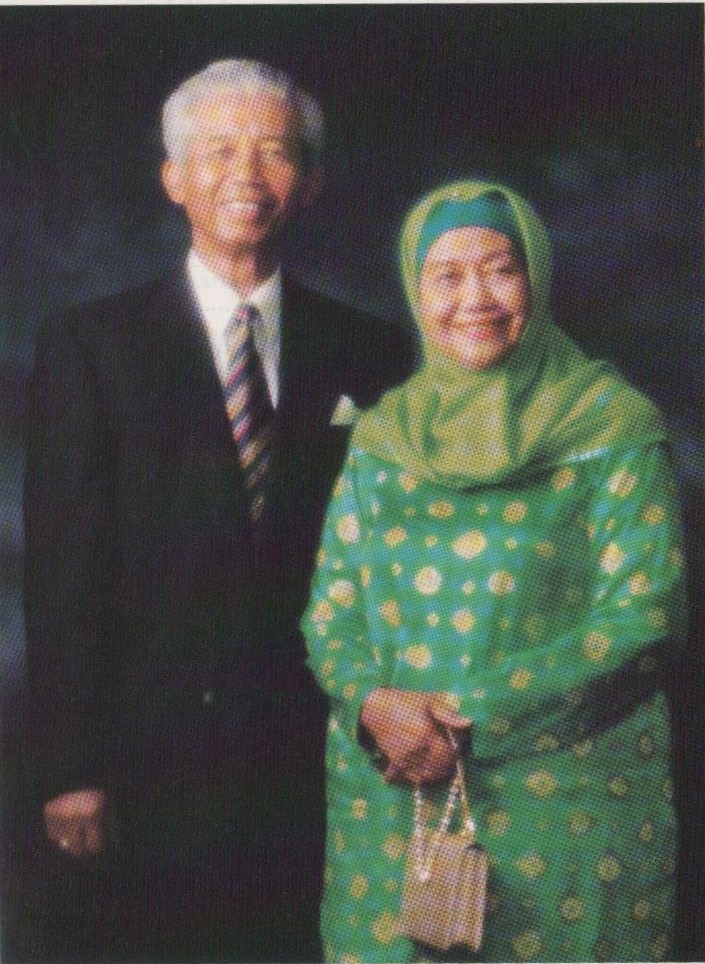
Sudharmono (left), with his wife, Emma Norma (right)

Sudharmono married Emma Norma in 1951, and together they have three children, Sri Adyanti Sudharmono, Sri Aryani Sudharmono, and Tantyo A.P Sudharmono. As of 2021, Tantyo Sudharmono had served as the Chairman of the Indonesian National Council for Social Welfare. Emma Norma outlived Sudharmono by six years. She died in 2012 at Pertamina Central Hospital, Jakarta. Her body was also interred at the Kalibata Heroes' Cemetery, Jakarta.

== See also ==
- List of vice presidents of Indonesia

Political offices
Preceded by Umar Wirahadikusumah	Vice President of Indonesia; 11 March 1988 – 11 March 1993	Succeeded by Try Sutrisno
Preceded by Alamsyah Ratu Perwiranegara	State Minister/State Secretary; 1972–1988	Succeeded by Moerdiono
