= 2023 eruption of Mount Marapi =

Volcanic eruption in West Sumatra, Indonesia

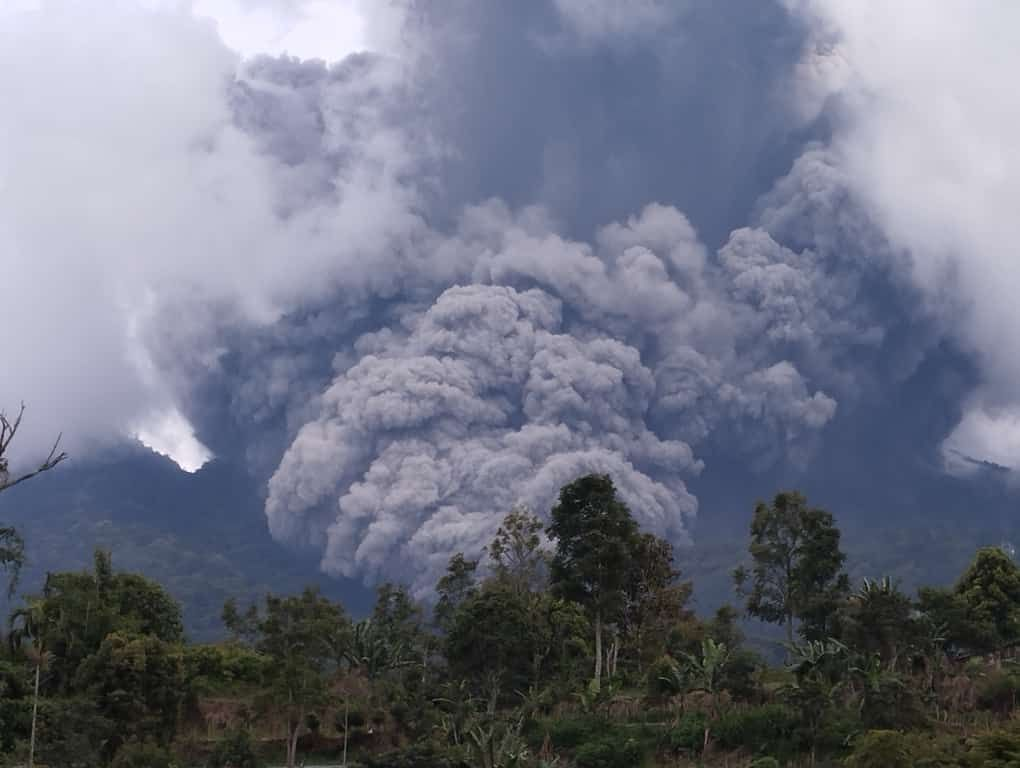
- Ash from the eruption
- Volcano: Mount Marapi
- Date: 3 December 2023; 14:54 Western Indonesian Time (07:54 UTC)
- Location: West Sumatra, Indonesia; 0.3800°S 100.4742°E
- VEI: 2
- Impact: 24 dead, 12 injured

Map of Mount Marapi in West Sumatra

On 3 December 2023, Mount Marapi, a complex volcano on the Indonesian island of Sumatra, erupted, sending ash as high as 3,000 metres (10,000 ft) into the air, and depositing large amounts of volcanic ash in nearby districts. Twenty-four hikers were found dead near the crater of the volcano.

== Background ==
As the most active complex volcano in West Sumatra province, and in proximity to populated areas, Mount Marapi is a significant hazard. Since 2011, the volcano has been at the level II (Waspada) of a four-tier alert system set up by the Volcanological Survey of Indonesia. A significant eruption occurred in 1979, killing 60 people. At least one person was killed in an eruption in 1996. During April–May 2018 ashfalls to the southeast occurred. The volcano last erupted in January 2023 but did not cause casualties. Predicting the volcano's behavior is described as difficult because the geological sources of its sudden eruptions are shallow and near its peak; that is, its eruptions are not caused by a deep movement of magma that can be detected as volcanic earthquakes on seismic monitors. About 1,400 people live on its slopes in the Rubai and Gobah Cumantiang villages, about 5–6 kilometres (3.1–3.7 mi) from the summit.

Before the 2023 eruption, Volcanological Survey of Indonesia head Hendra Gunawan said that the agency had been warning the local conservation agency and the Ministry of Environment and Forestry for over a decade against allowing climbers to go within three kilometres (1.9 mi) of the volcano's crater. The conservation agency said that climbing permits were issued by several local agencies, including the provincial government of West Sumatra, the local office of the National Search and Rescue Agency in the provincial capital of Padang, and the National Agency for Disaster Countermeasure. Some of the hiking trails on Marapi had been reopened in June 2023 following the eruptions earlier in the year.

== Eruption ==
On 3 December 2023, Mount Marapi erupted. The eruption sent ash as high as 3,000 metres (10,000 ft) into the air, and volcanic ash was deposited in several nearby districts. There were a total of 46 eruptions and 66 blasts observed from the volcano's observation post on 3–4 December.

Several cities in West Sumatra such as Padang Panjang and Bukittinggi, as well as the regencies of Pasaman and West Pasaman received volcanic ash. The eruption lasted four minutes and registered 30 mm (1.2 in) as its maximum amplitude on a seismograph.

On 22 December, the volcano erupted again, emitting volcanic ash that forced the cancellation of flights at Minangkabau International Airport.

As of January 2024, at least 113 eruptions have occurred on Marapi since its initial activity in December, with the latest eruption occurring on 14 January.

== Casualties ==
The eruption occurred while many climbers were on the mountain's slopes. Out of 75 hikers who climbed the mountain on 2 December, 49 were evacuated, three were found alive and rescued, and 24 were found dead; twelve of the survivors were injured.

The fatalities were found near the crater of the volcano, while the search for other missing hikers was interrupted by sporadic eruptions, with the body of the last fatality being recovered on 6 December. The fatalities suffered severe burns that prevented facial identification, while some of the survivors sustained burns and fractures. One hiker recalled that he had not noticed any warning that the volcano was going to erupt apart from encountering a group of monkeys screaming frantically as his group reached the base of the volcano upon their descent.

== Response ==
In response to the eruption, local authorities prohibited any activity within three kilometres (1.9 mi) of the volcano. Masks were distributed to residents, who were encouraged to stay home.

At the end of 5 December, while the evacuation process was still ongoing, out of 23 fatalities found, only five bodies were recovered that day. All 23 bodies were eventually recovered by the afternoon of 6 December, marking the end of the evacuation.

== See also ==
- List of volcanoes in Indonesia
- 1979 eruption of Mount Marapi
- List of volcanic eruptions in the 21st century
- List of volcanic eruptions by death toll
