= Minangkabau =

Minangkabau may refer to:

- Minangkabau culture, culture of the Minangkabau people
- Minangkabau Culture Documentation and Information Center
- Minangkabau Express, an airport rail link service serving Minangkabau International Airport (see below)
- Minangkabau F.C., a football club based in Padang, West Sumatra
- Minangkabau Highlands, West Sumatra
- Minangkabau International Airport, West Sumatra
  - Minangkabau International Airport railway station, an airport railway station
- Minangkabau (legend), a folklore story
- Minangkabau people or Minang, an ethnic group indigenous to the Minangkabau Highlands of West Sumatra
  - Overseas Minangkabau, demographic group of Minangkabau people of Minangkabau Highlands origin in West Sumatra, Indonesia who have settled in other parts of the world
  - Minangkabau language, the language spoken by this people
- Minangkabau War or Padri War, fought in the Minangkabau Highlands from 1803 to 1837

== See also ==
- Minang (disambiguation)
