= Mount Tandikat =

Stratovolcano in Sumatra, Indonesia

Tandikat
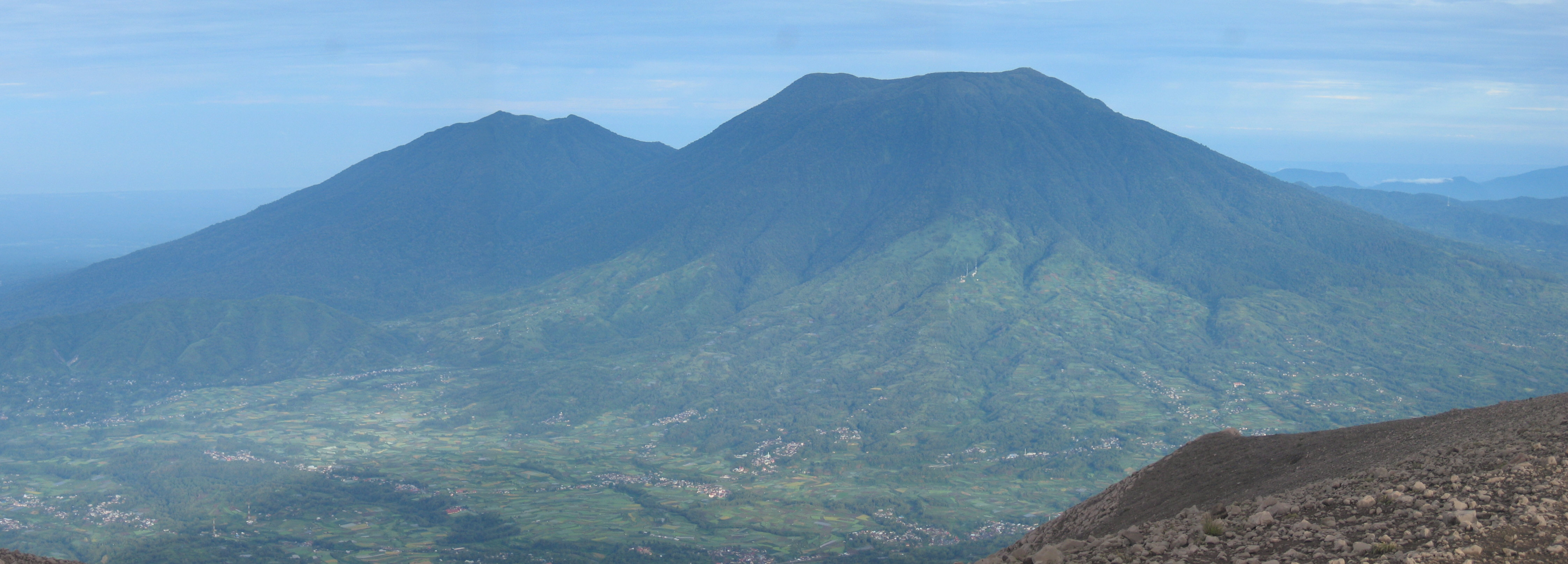
- The Tandikat (left) - Singgalang (right) twin volcano as seen from Marapi.

Highest point
- Elevation: 2,438 m (7,999 ft)
- Coordinates: 0°25′57.30″S 100°19′1.69″E

Geography
- Location within Sumatra
- Location: West Sumatra, Indonesia
- Parent range: Barisan Mountains

Geology
- Mountain type: Stratovolcano
- Rock type: Andesite
- Volcanic arc: Sunda Arc
- Last eruption: April 1924

Tandikat is an active stratovolcano in West Sumatra, Indonesia. Its elevation is 2,438 m (7,999 ft). It is a twin volcano with Mount Singgalang, which is located to the north-north-east of Tandikat. However, only Tandikat has had historical volcanic activity. The city of Padang Panjang is located at the foot of the mountain.

== Geology ==
Mount Tandikat is part of the greater Sunda Arc subduction zone. Volcanism here is caused by the Indo-Australian plate subducting under the Sunda plate. As the Indo-Australian plate subducts into the mantle, it carries with it vast amounts of seawater. At ~20 kilometers (12.5 miles) water start to dehydrate from the subducted slab, which lowers the melting point of the surrounding mantle. This generates magma which is more buoyant than the surrounding mantle. This makes its way to the surface and erupts as a volcano, which is how Mount Tandikat operates.

Mount Tandikat sits about 285 km (177 miles) from the Java trench. Melt begins at around 130 km (80 miles) directly below the volcano.

Quaternary-aged rocks from early eruptions are made up of hornblende hypersthene pumiceous tuff which occurred around 52 ka. Most of Mount Tandikat's eruptions are made of andesite lava's, which are intermediate in silica content. It is thought that Mount Tandikat has two separate magma chambers. The shallow magma chamber is around 5 km (3 miles) deep, and there is also a deeper magma chamber of an unknown depth.

== 2009 landslide ==
On April 30, 2009, at 17:16 local time, a powerful 7.6 magnitude earthquake triggered a large debris avalanche at Mount Tandikat. This was the most extensive of many landslides caused by the earthquake. Due to heavy rainfall in the area, 30-50 degree slopes, and loose pumice weakened the slopes of the volcano. The earthquake caused the side of the mountain to "flow" downhill which killed hundreds of people.

== See also ==
- List of volcanoes in Indonesia
- Sumatra Trench
