= Arifin Bey =

Indonesian diplomat

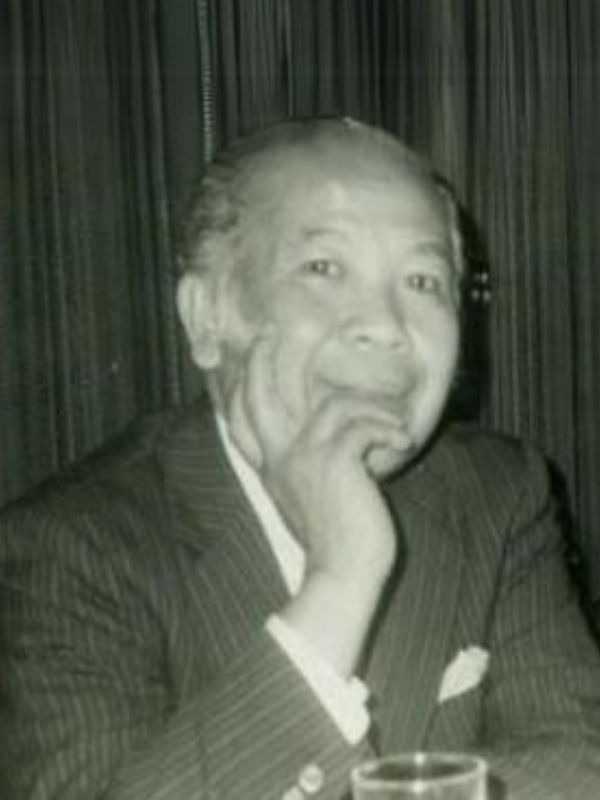
- Born: 5 March 1925; Padang Pandjang, Sumatra's West Coast Residency, Dutch East Indies
- Died: 2 September 2010 (Age 85); Indonesia
- Education: Hiroshima University; Georgetown University; New York University
- Occupation: Diplomat

Arifin Bey (5 March 1925 – 2 September 2010) was an Indonesian diplomat.

== Early life ==
He was born in Padang Panjang, West Sumatra in the Minangkabau Highlands, one year before the Communist revolt in 1926.

He was one of eight siblings, five girls and three boys. His father was a school inspector in the Dutch administration. Among friends and colleagues, he was known as Buyung, thus his Dutch colleagues referred to him as Mijnheer Bij,-Mr.B. Bij was Indonesianised to Bey, and adopted as the family name of his children. Arifin was highly intelligent, and qualified for entry into the Dutch educational stream. It was said of him that he was never without a book. He kept up with world events, and assembled files of newspaper clippings. He was politically engaged, and a member of the Young Sumatra Association. At the age of 16, his public speaking activities had him investigated by the police, his father interrogated, their home searched, and his newspaper clippings confiscated. The headmaster of the Dutch school he attended recognized his ability saved him from any further escalation of punishment, and arranged for him to continue teacher-training studies in Bandung.

The Japanese occupation in 1942 interrupted his formal education. Although he continued his studies in private.

He was selected by the Japanese to study in Japan as a potential leader of Indonesia when the war was won. Ironically, Tokyo was thought to be too dangerous for his cohort of Indonesian and other students from Southeast Asia, and they were sent to study at the Hiroshima University of Arts and Sciences.

He went to Japan as a scholarship student during the Pacific War, when Indonesia was under Japanese occupation, and found himself in Hiroshima in 1945, when the city was hit by an atomic bomb. Of the five hundred students in the university lecture theatre when the bomb exploded, he and Hasan Rahaya (also from Indonesia) survived. Physically he was not severely injured, but later developed radiation sickness. He remained in Japan for some time, and by chance at a railway station, saw a Japanese woman hassled by a group of American soldiers. He extricated her from the melee, to her great relief. His Japanese by then was so fluent that at first she thought he was Japanese. Discovering he was an Indonesian, she took him home to meet her parents and siblings. Two of her brothers were doctors, and recognising he was suffering from radiation sickness, arranged hospital treatment for him. The family virtually adopted him, and shared in caring for him. The two married not long afterwards. They remained to be married, until she passed away from cancer.

His knowledge of English, gained at the Dutch school, his mastery of Japanese, and his outstanding general ability and social skills led him to the Department of Foreign Affairs when he returned to Indonesia. He was sent to America, and in 1954 was the first Indonesia to serve in a staff appointment at the United Nations in New York City. He continued to study, gaining a Bachelor’s and then a master's degree at a New York University. He returned to Indonesia, and after serving for two years as assistant to the Director of the Indonesian Institute of the Sciences, was sponsored by the Ford Foundation for a Ph.D at Georgetown University. In 1961, he completed his studies at Georgetown University, earning a Ph.D. in international political science through a dissertation on dialogue in search of consensus in the Indonesian political process.

== Activities ==
On returning to Indonesia, he was appointed editor of the semi-official English language daily, Indonesian Herald. He was the editor from 1961 to 1967. During the years of Guided Democracy amid the increasing tensions leading to the attempted coup in 1965.

He was assigned as a councilor to the Indonesian Embassy in Tokyo in 1967. He would also found an Association of Japanese speaking diplomats. It met for lunch monthly, invited Japanese guests to give lectures in Japanese, and for the length of the meeting, only Japanese was spoken. A highlight in this period was acting as interpreter for President Suharto on his state visit to Japan in 1968 when he addressed the Foreign Correspondents Club.

Bey would later received invitations to give seminars, and to teach at the Area Studies Program at Tsukuba University, where he was required to lecture in both Japanese and English. In doing so, he had a key role in developing Southeast Asian Studies in Japan.

He returned to Jakarta in 1970. But despite the quality of his work in Japan, rumours that he had sailed too close to the wind in his editorship of the Indonesian Herald persisted. The then Foreign Minister Adam Malik granted him ‘extended leave without pay’, and he left the country again for Japan.

Between 1972 – 74, he served as a Visiting Lecturer at Sophia University and the International Christian University, teaching courses on Western Political Thought and Intercultural Communication respectively. In 1976 he was appointed as visiting professor at Tsukuba University, a position which he held until 1984.

The Iranian Islamic revolution in 1979, transformed his position and his role. Bey was at the time one of the very few scholars of Islamic faith in Japan who could lecture on Islam as a religion and culture in Japanese. And he was inundated with invitations to write articles or give talks on Islam. Alongside his courses on Modern Japanese Politics Domestic and International, he developed introductory courses on Islam, and on the Religions and Cultures of Southeast Asia.

In 1984, he received a commendation from the Japanese Ministry for Foreign Affairs for ‘Meritorious Services in Culture and Information’. In the same year he resigned from Tsukuba University in 1984, planning to use his unique knowledge and experience of Japan to develop Japanese Studies at tertiary institutions in Indonesia. In 1985, he moved to the Universitas Nasional Jakarta, to found The Japan Research Centre, which he directed until 1987. He later returned to Japan again and was appointed visiting professor at Kanda University of International Studies in Chiba, where he taught until 1995. In 1991, he was presented the Japanese Imperial Medal of The Order of Sacred Treasure, Gold Rays and Neck Ribbon.

At the age of 70, in 1995, he returned once more, to Indonesia. Although he was appointed for a three-year term to a position as visiting professor at the University of Malaya shortly afterwards. Only in 1998 did he make his home again in Jakarta. There he devoted his energies to a different level of the educational spectrum. With his daughter Mulyati Bey, he established an Islamic kindergarten, Taman Kanak-Kanak Islam Arif Mulya in the Jakarta suburb of Bukit Modern. In the year 2000, on his 75th birthday, he added the final touch to his career by performing Hajj with his daughter.

=== Works ===
He wrote widely and copiously, although most of his publications are in Japanese. He did however in 2002 publish a book of collected essays, Beyond Civilizational Dialogue, in part autobiographical, part reflective on global issues of politics and culture, in part on the role of Islam in society. The late Professor Nurcholish Madjid wrote a preface. It has many vivid anecdotes. One is of the pains of studying Japanese; another is of Hatta being offered pork at New York state luncheon; another is of the American Visiting American Professor in 1955 who urged him to write a Ph.D thesis on why Indonesia should take America's side in the Cold War. He replied that the ideologies of Democracy and Communism were not his concern. He was more concerned with issues of personal and national identity. The Professor replied, ‘The whole American mission is to implant democracy in the four corners of the world. Even if you do not want it, we will push it down your throat for your own good’. But Arifin, in his father’s foot-steps stood by his convictions.

== Publications ==
(English)

- Bey, H. Arifin. (2003), Beyond civilizational dialogue : a multicultural symbiosis in the service of world politics, Published by Paramadina in cooperation with The Japan Foundation, Jakarta

(Indonesian)

- Bey, Arifin (1990), Peranan Jepang dalam pasca "Abad Amerika": Serangkai Bunga Rampai, Published by Antakarya
