= Belimbing =

Belimbing may refer to:

- Belimbing, Malaysia, town in Pahang, Malaysia
- Belimbing, West Sumatra, village in West Sumatra, Indonesia
- Kampong Belimbing, village in Brunei
