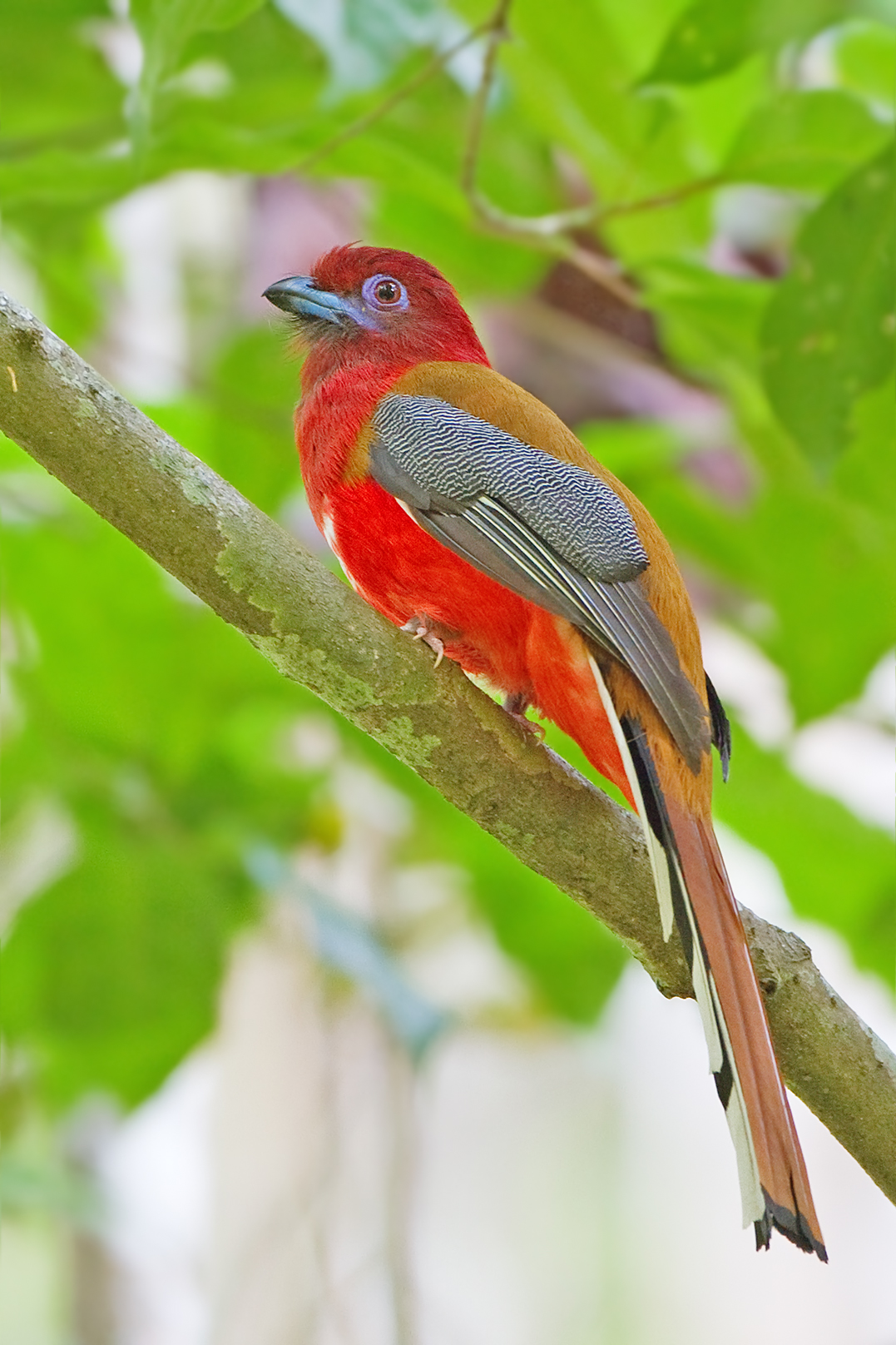

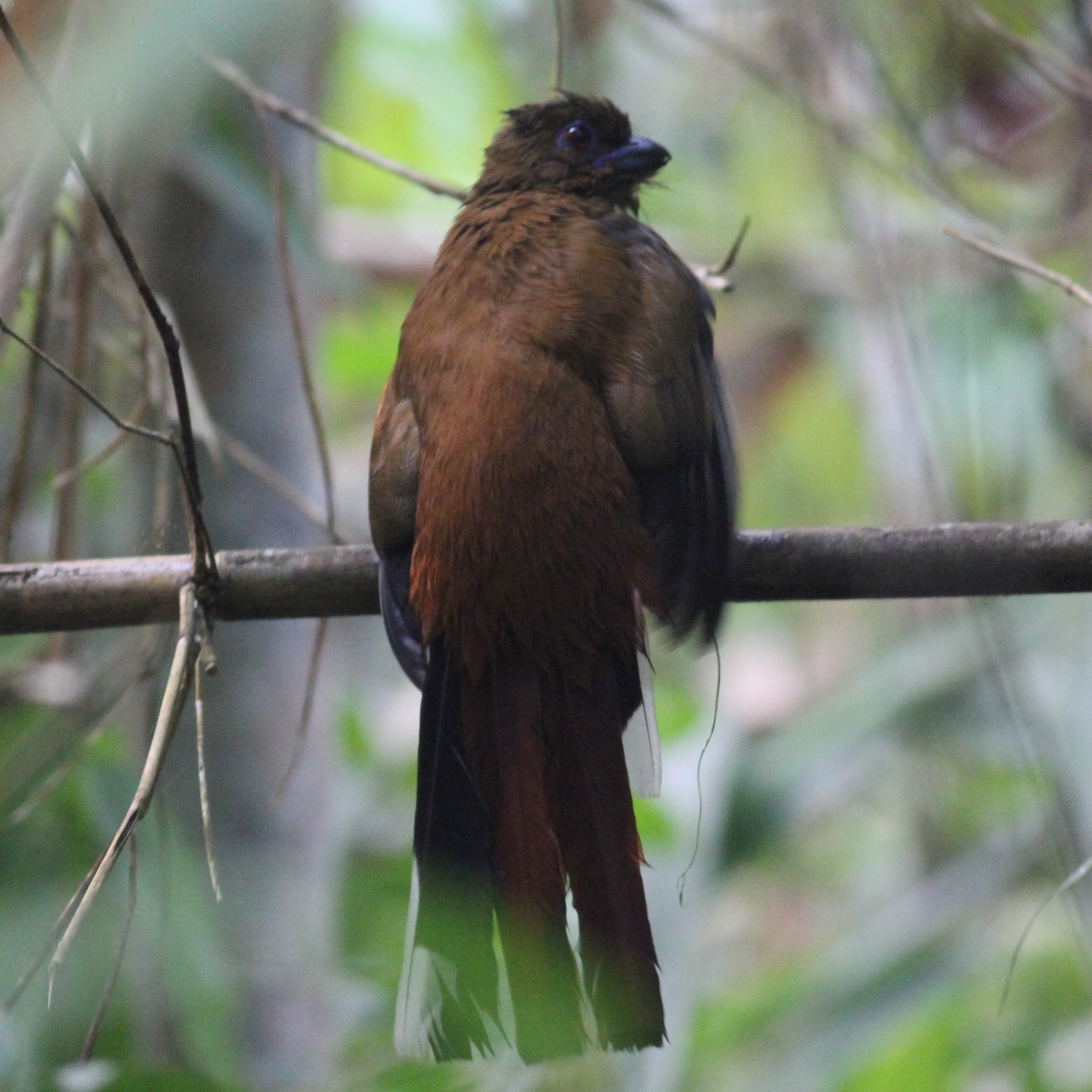

Conservation status
- Least Concern (IUCN 3.1)

Scientific classification
- Kingdom: Animalia
- Phylum: Chordata
- Class: Aves
- Order: Trogoniformes
- Family: Trogonidae
- Genus: Harpactes
- Species: H. erythrocephalus

Binomial name
- Harpactes erythrocephalus (Gould, 1834)

= Red-headed trogon =

Species of bird

The red-headed trogon (Harpactes erythrocephalus) is a species of bird in the family Trogonidae.

== Etymology ==
H. erythrocephalus comes from the Ancient Greek terms ἐρυθρός eruthros meaning red and κεφαλή, kephalē meaning head.

== Description ==
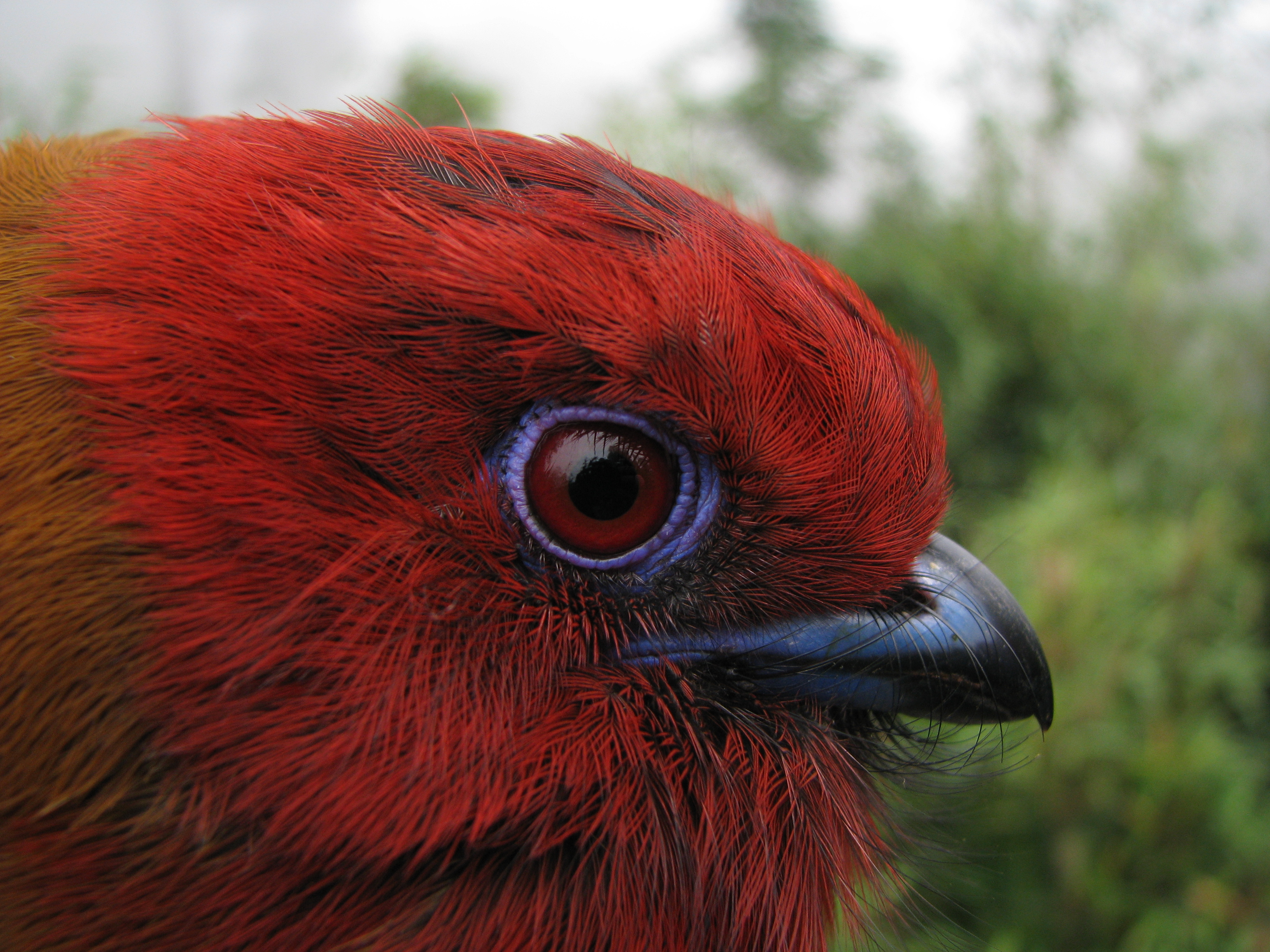
Close-up of a male's head. note the blue eye-ring and blue bill

The red-headed trogon is on average 34 cm (13 in) in length. The male has a red head and breast, a unique feature in the Trogon group. The female resembles the Diard's trogon without a speckled undertail.

The head, neck and upper breast of an adult male is dull crimson. A narrow white band crosses the mid breast, underneath which the lower breast to abdomen is light red to pink. Pale red can be observed on the flanks whereas the mantle and back of the bird are rusty brown. The male perches on branches with the support of mauve-blue legs. Regarding wing colouration, the lesser and median wing coverts, secondary coverts, as well as outer webs of tertials and secondaries are vermiculated black and white. The primary feathers also appear black and white. As for the bird's long tail, the central feathers are dark brown with a black tip, the second and third pairs are black and the outer pairs are white with black bases. Finally, a black-tipped cobalt blue bill, a deep mauve-blue gape and eyering and reddish-brown irises shape the bird's face.

The head, neck and upper breast of an adult female are olive-brown. Just like the male, a narrow white band crosses the mid breast, underneath which the lower breast to abdomen is light red to pink. The mantle and back appear orange to brown in colour. The wings are vermiculated dark brown and yellowish brown. The tail feathers are very similar to those of the males. The bill, gape and bare eyering are pale blue on females.

At the juvenile stage, the head, neck and upper-parts are buff brown, whereas the underparts appear buff white. No black tip on the narrower central tail feathers can be observed.

=== Standard measurements ===
	Male	Female
Mass (g)	85-110	76
Wing length (mm)	144-156	140-156
Tail length (mm)	154-185	160-192
Bill length (mm)	19-21	19-21
Tarsal length (mm)	16-18	16-18

== Taxonomy ==
Trogon erythrocephalus was the scientific name proposed by John Gould in 1834 for a red-headed trogon specimen from Yangon in Myanmar. In the 19th and 20th centuries, several specimens were described:

- Trogon flagrans proposed by Salomon Müller in 1836 was a dark red-headed trogon collected on Mount Singgalang in Sumatra, Indonesia.
- Harpactes yamakanensis proposed by C. B. Rickett in 1899 was an olive-brown red-headed trogon collected near Yamakan in Fujian, China.
- Harpactes hainanus proposed by William Robert Ogilvie-Grant in 1900 was a specimen with a purplish crimson head and nape that was collected in the Wuzhi Mountains on Hainan Island.
- Pyrotrogon erythrocephalus klossi proposed by Herbert C. Robinson in 1915 was a brilliant red coloured trogon collected on Ko Chang Island, Thailand.
- Pyrotrogon erythrocephalus annamensis proposed by Robinson and C. Boden Kloss in 1919 were an adult male and four female red-headed trogons with ochraceous brown back and rump that were collected in a hilly area in southern Vietnam at elevations of 910–2,290 m (3,000–7,500 ft).
- Pyrotrogon erythrocephalus intermedius proposed by Norman Boyd Kinnear in 1925 were three specimens with a bright plumage that were collected in the Tonkin area.
- Harpactes erythrocephalus rosa proposed by Erwin Stresemann in 1929 was a specimen collected in the mountains of northern Guangxi in China.
- Harpactes erythrocephalus chaseni by Joseph Harvey Riley in 1934 were a male and female specimens from the Selangor in the Malay Peninsula.
- Harpactes erythrocephalus helenae by Ernst Mayr in 1941 was a specimen from Myitkyina District in Myanmar.

== Distribution and habitat ==
A male red-headed trogon in Garbganga, Assam, India

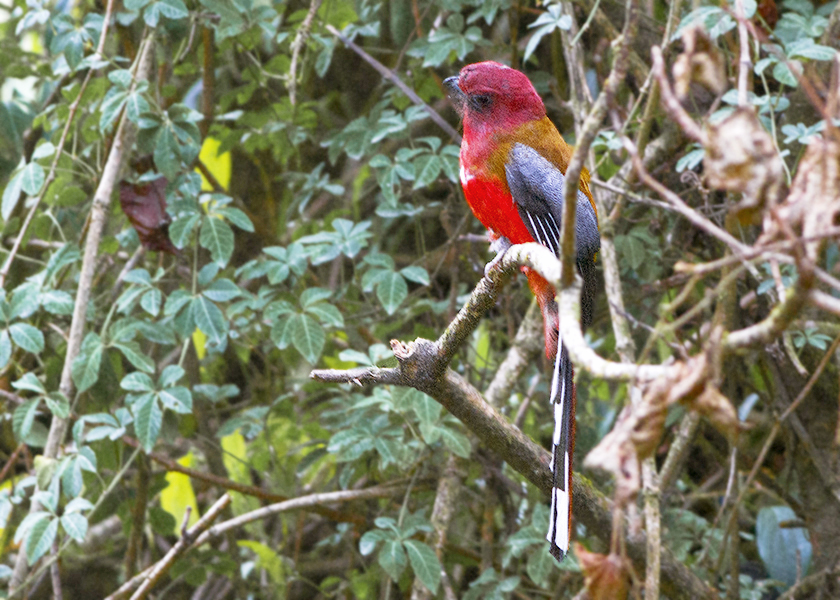
A red-headed trogon in Neora Valley National Park

The red-headed trogon is widely distributed from central Nepal, Southeast Asia, southern China to Sumatra. It is uncommon to scarce in Nepal where habitat destruction most certainly explains a rapid decline in population numbers. It is fairly common in northeastern India, frequent in Bhutan, and locally dispersed in Bangladesh. It prefers upland forests and lives in dense broadleaved forests and in tropical and subtropical zones in the Himalayan foothills. In Southeast Asia, it frequents broadleaved evergreen forests from 300 to 2,600 m (980 to 8,530 ft). In Myanmar, it lives in bamboo and oak forests at an elevation of 2,500 m (8,200 ft). In Laos, it occurs in evergreen forests and adjacent plains 1,700 m (5,600 ft). The forests in Vietnam appear to be a stronghold. In northern, western and southern Thailand, it favours climax broadleaved evergreen forests between 400 and 2,000 m (1,300 and 6,600 ft). On the Malay Peninsula, it inhabits evergreen lowland, lower montane and taller upper montane forests at elevations ranging from 300 to 1,680 m (980 to 5,510 ft). Farther south, it is rarely seen below 700 m (2,300 ft).

== Behaviour and ecology ==
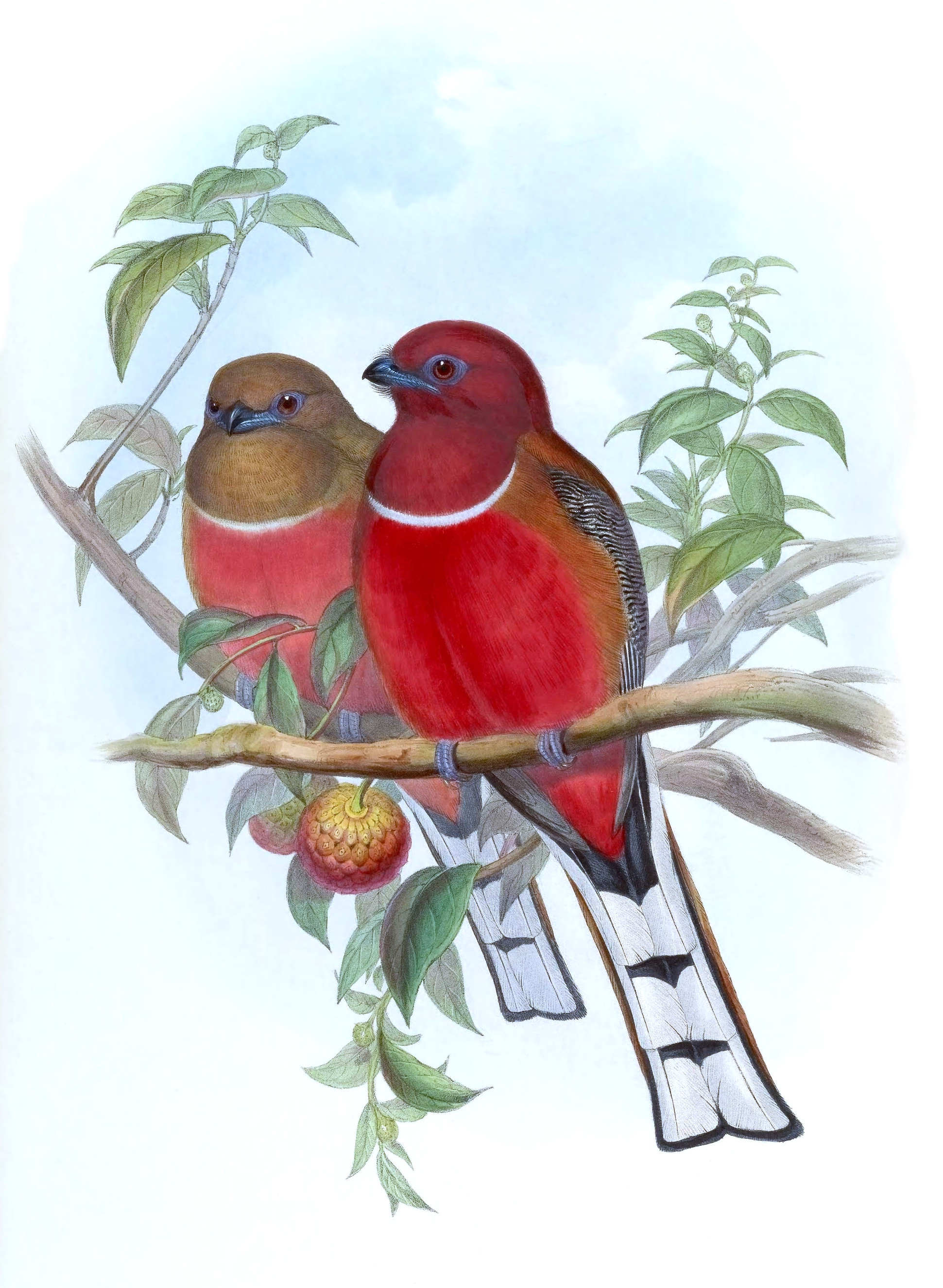
A reproductive pair of red-headed trogons

The red-headed trogon has often been observed perching on shaded branches waiting for prey, alone or in pairs. Its flight between trees is often sluggish and very low, only a few meters above the ground. It is most active in the early morning hours and at night, when pursuing moths at the edges of forest clearings. In central southern Thailand, it shares habitat with the Orange-breasted trogon (Harpactes oreskios). The two species often follow flocks of foraging birds taking advantage of the insects they flush out. In most regions, it is sedentary, but also been observed to migrate between different elevations in northern and southern Laos.

=== Calls ===
The male's call resembles that of the Eurasian golden oriole (Oriolus oriolus): a sequence of usually five to six, well-spaced mellow "tyaup" notes, repeated every minute. Occasionally the male calls an extended "pluu-du" note marked by a significant terminal drop in pitch. The call is repeated every 3–6 seconds.

=== Diet ===
The red-headed trogon feeds primarily on insects and their larvae, including green orthopterans, stick-insects, cicadas, millipedes, flies, beetles, centipedes, woodlice and moths. It also feeds on leaves and fruits.

=== Reproduction ===
The red-headed trogon usually builds nests in a natural tree cavity 1.5 to 5 m (4 ft 11 in to 16 ft 5 in) above the ground. The entrance hole is generally wide, and occasionally, the mating pair excavates the entire nesting cavity. Sometimes, it uses old nesting holes of woodpeckers and barbets. The female lays 2 to 4 round, cream coloured, glossy eggs, measuring approximately 26.5 mm–27.5 mm × 23.5 mm–24.0 mm (1.04 in–1.08 in × 0.93 in–0.94 in). Both sexes contribute to the nesting process, namely excavating, incubating the eggs, brooding and feeding the offspring. Females incubate and spend more time brooding, also at night. Males provide food for the chicks. During the day, the pair broods in turns, but also incubate together. In Thailand, nesting occurs in March and continues until July. Chicks hatch after an incubation period of 18 days and leave the nest after 13.4 days. In Northern India, females lay eggs between mid April and mid July, with a peak in May and June. In China and Myanmar, they lay eggs in April. On the Malay Peninsula dependent juveniles have been observed between early March and late May.
