= Beddu Amang =

Indonesian economist (1936–2021)

Head of State Logistics Agency
- In office 16 February 1995 – 26 August 1998
- President: Suharto; B. J. Habibie
- Preceded by: Ibrahim Hassan
- Succeeded by: Rahardi Ramelan

Member of the People's Consultative Assembly
- In office 1 October 1992 – 1 October 1999
- President: Suharto; B. J. Habibie

Member of the People's Representative Council
- In office 13 February 1968 – 22 May 1969
- President: Suharto
- Parliamentary group: Indonesian Students Action Union

Personal details
- Born: 7 August 1936 Makassar, Dutch East Indies
- Died: 9 January 2021 (aged 84) Jakarta, Indonesia
- Party: Golkar
- Spouse: Maesarah

Beddu Amang (7 August 1936 – 9 January 2021) was an Indonesian economist. He served as the head of the State Logistics Agency (Bulog) from 1995 to 1998. Born and raised in South Sulawesi, Beddu migrated to Yogyakarta and finished his university education at the Gadjah Mada University.

Beddu worked in the State Logistics Agency since his graduation from high school. Briefly serving as a member of the People's Representative Council, he was promoted several times in the agency until he headed the agency in 1995. During his tenure, the agency's responsibility was reduced to only handle the distribution and price control of rice. He was deposed in 1998 due to conflict about imports with two other ministers. He was later convicted for corruption in 2001 and was imprisoned until 2007. He died in January 2021.

== Early life ==
Beddu Amang was born on 7 August 1936 in Makassar, the capital of South Sulawesi. Beddu graduated from the People's School (equivalent to elementary school) in Makale, Tana Toraja, in 1950. He studied at the State Junior High School in Makassar, graduating in 1953, and at the Agricultural High School in Makassar, graduating in 1956. Beddu then enrolled at the Agricultural Faculty of the Gadjah Mada University in 1957 and graduated in 1966 with an engineer's degree (Ir.).

During his time at the Gadjah Mada University, Beddu was the chairman of the Muslim Students' Association in Yogyakarta, the university's region. The organization often faced threats from the local branch of the Communist Party of Indonesia. On 30 September 1965, the party supported the acts of a rebel group of the army, which killed Col. Katamso, the region's military commander and his chief of staff, Lt. Col. Sugijono. In response, the Indonesia Army sent a group of troops under the command of Sarwo Edhie Wibowo to the region, which was welcomed by Beddu. He then held a mass meeting at the northern square of Yogyakarta and unilaterally declared the dissolution of the communist party on 21 October 1965.

== Career ==
Beddu began working in the Department of Agriculture on his graduation from the Agricultural High School. On 1 October 1966, he became the Head of Research and Statistics of the State Logistics Agency. A year later, he resigned and became a member of the People's Representative Council on 13 February 1968, representing the Indonesian Students Action Union, being replaced on 22 May 1969. Beddu then returned to the State Logistics Agency, successively heading the Public Relations and Processing Bureau (until 1970), Price and Market Analysis Bureau (1970–1976) and Distribution Bureau. He briefly served as the acting deputy of Kagudstanpusut.

Beddu resigned from his office at the State Logistics Agency to study at the University of California, Davis in the United States. He graduated with a Master of Arts degree in Economic Development in 1981 and a PhD in economics in 1984.

Beddu returned to Indonesia in 1984 and was appointed as an expert assisting the Head of the State Logistics Agency. He held the office for a year and then was appointed as the Vice Deputy for Procurement and Distribution. He became the deputy in December 1988. He was promoted five years later on 1 March 1993 as the Deputy Head of the State Logistics Agency.

Beddu was also appointed to national and international offices. He was a member of the People's Consultative Assembly for seven years from 1 October 1992, and Chairman of the Food Security Board of ASEAN for 1989–1990 and 1994–1995.

=== Head of the State Logistics Agency ===
Beddu became the Head of the State Logistics Agency on 16 February 1995, replacing Ibrahim Hassan who served concurrently as the State Minister for Food Affairs. Beddu's appointment marked the separation between the two offices. On the day of his inauguration, reporters questioned whether the separation of office has any relations with the 1994 droughts which caused uncontrollable inflation in food prices. Moerdiono, the State Secretary, denied the allegations.

Beddu continued to hold the office throughout Suharto's seventh and last cabinet and B. J. Habibie's first and only cabinet. During his tenure, the government enacted Presidential Decree No. 45 of 1997. Before the enactment, the agency controlled the price and supply of all vital foodstuffs. The enactment limited the authority of the agency to only rice and sugar. The authority of the agency was further reduced in 1998, when sugar was removed from the agency's scope, making rice the sole focus of the agency. The two-part reduction was enacted in accordance to the Letter of Intent made between the government of Indonesia and the International Monetary Fund.

On 27 August 1998, President Habibie dismissed Beddu from office and replaced him with Rahardi Ramelan, the Minister of Trade. The State Logistics Agency was removed from the direct control of the president, becoming an institution under the Ministry of Trade. Dawam Rahardjo, a reporter from the Republika newspaper, considered Beddu's dismissal to be related to conflict about the procedure for importing rice and cooking oil between Beddu and Rahardi Ramelan and Adi Sasono (Minister of Cooperatives, Small and Medium Businesses). Habibie's stated reason for dismissing Beddu was to dispel the impression of nepotism in his cabinet (Habibie and Beddu were both from South Sulawesi).

== Corruption ==
On 5 November 2001, Beddu was accused of corruption. The panel of judges revealed that the state suffered losses of 20.29 billion rupiahs from the economic loss on the guarantee of Bulog's funds of 23 billion rupiah. The funds are used as collateral for PT Goro's working capital loan to Bank Bukopin. After the judges announced their verdict, Beddu appealed and refused to accept the judge's decision. He argued the state benefited 9.4 billion rupiah instead from guarantee of Bulog's funds. The prosecutor demanded him to serve four years in prison. However, the judges reduced the prison term, and Beddu was sentenced to two years in prison. Beddu was also obliged to pay 5 billion rupiahs to compensate the state's loss and pay 5 million rupiahs as a fine. Beddu fully paid his fine in March 2004 and paid the compensation on 16 July 2006.

In January 2004, Beddu re-appealed his case. However, the judges refused his statement and his sentence was increased from two years to four years. Beddu was paroled on 8 May 2006, and he unsuccessfully appealed his case to the Supreme Court two months later. He was fully freed on 7 March 2007.

== Personal life ==
Beddu was married to Maesarah. The couple had one son and two daughters.

== Death ==
Beddu Amang died at the Pondok Indah Hospital in Jakarta on 9 January 2021.

== Awards ==
=== State awards ===
- Civil Service Long Service Medal, 3rd Class (1989)
- 25 Years of Development Medal (1992)
- Development Medal (1992)
- Star of Service, 1st Class (1994)
- Role Model Medal (1995)
- Star of Mahaputera, 3rd Class (1996)
- Civil Service Long Service Medal, 1st Class (1997)

=== Other awards ===
- Outstanding Alumni from the Agricultural Faculty of the Gadjah Mada University (1996)
- Outstanding Alumni from the Gadjah Mada University (1997)
- Honorary Extraordinary Professor of Agricultural Economics from the Hasanuddin University (6 September 1997)

== General bibliography ==
- Tim Penerbitan Buku 50 Tahun UGM (1999), Apa & siapa sejumlah alumni UGM [Who's Who of Several UGM Alumni] (in Indonesian), Jakarta, ISBN 9789798391835
- Tim Penyusun Sejarah (1970), Seperempat Abad Dewan Perwakilan Rakjat Republik Indonesia [A Quarter Century of the People's Representative Council of the Republic of Indonesia] (PDF) (in Indonesian), Jakarta: Sekretariat DPR-GR, archived from the original (PDF) on 7 April 2023
- Ashari, Fauzan Adi (2015), Pasang Surut Sejarah Bulog di Indonesia Pada Tahun 1967—1998 (PDF) (in Indonesian), Jember: University of Jember
- Malley, Michael (April 1998), "The 7th Development Cabinet: Loyal to a Fault?" (PDF), Indonesia, 65 (65): 155–178, doi:10.2307/3351408, hdl:1813/54137, JSTOR 3351408, archived from the original (PDF) on 16 July 2019
- Andriyanto, Tri (2012), PENGARUH LETTER OF INTENT (LoI) IMF TERHADAP PELEMAHAN KETAHANAN PANGAN BERAS INDONESIA 1995-2009 (PDF) (Undergraduate), University of Indonesia
