= Bulog =

Indonesian food distribution company

BULOG Public Corporation

- Bulog headquarters
- Type: Statutory corporation
- Industry: Food distribution
- Founded: 10 May 1967
- Headquarters: Jln. Jend. Gatot Subroto Kav. 49 South Jakarta 12950, Indonesia
- Revenue: ▲ Rp 46.6 trillion (2016)
- Net income: ▲ Rp 800 billion (2016)
- Total assets: ▲ Rp 34.883 trillion (2016)
- Total equity: ▲Rp 11.318 trillion (2016)
- Owner: Government of Indonesia
- Number of employees: 4,693(2016)
- Website: www.bulog.co.id

BULOG Public Corporation (Indonesian: Perusahaan Umum BULOG), formerly the Indonesia Logistics Bureau (Indonesian: Badan Urusan Logistik, lit. 'Logistic Affairs Agency') is a statutory corporation in Indonesia formed in service to food distribution and price control.

== History ==
Bulog's former logo used from 2003 until 27 May 2024

Bulog was formed on 10 May 1967 following Suharto's rise to power. Its initial purpose was to secure food supply following the chaos that followed Sukarno's fall, when inflation reached 650 percent in 1966. In 1969, its authorities expanded to price stabilization with the company's rice stocks acting as a buffer stock and it controlled rice imports and exports to stabilize market prices. In 1987, it was assigned to control multiple food commodities. Initially, the distribution of rice covered mainly civil servants (including military personnel), who received a 63% share of the 1.13 million tons of rice distributed by Bulog in 1970. However, market distribution grew, with 1.86 million of 2.66 million tons of rice distributed in 1980 going to open market operations.

Following the 1997 Asian financial crisis and Indonesia's acceptance of an economic rescue package from the IMF, Bulog's authority was reduced to a smaller basket of commodities.

== Chairman ==
This is the list of chairman of Bulog:

- Bustanil Arifin (1973–1993)
- Ibrahim Hassan (1993–1995)
- Beddu Amang (1995–1998)
- Rahardi Ramelan (1998–1999)
- Jusuf Kalla (1999–2000)
- Rizal Ramli (2000–2001)
- Widjanarko Puspoyo (2001–2007)
- Mustafa Abubakar (2007–2009)
- Sutarto Alimoeso (2009–2014)
- Lenny Sugihat (2014–2015)
- Djarot Kusumayakti (2015–2018)
- Budi Waseso (2018–December 2023)
- Bayu Krisnamurthi (December 2023–September 2024)
- Wahyu Suparyono (September 2024- 7 February 2025)
- Novi Helmy Prasetya (8 February 2025-present)
