= Tommy Rifka Putra =

Indonesian footballer

Personal information
- Full name: Tommy Rifka Putra
- Date of birth: June 26, 1984 (age 42)
- Place of birth: Padang Panjang, Indonesia
- Height: 1.75 m (5 ft 9 in)
- Position: Defender

Senior career*
Years	Team	Apps	(Gls)
2009–2010	Persela Lamongan	26	(1)
2010–2013	Semen Padang	56	(0)
- * Club domestic league appearances and goals as of 14 May 2012

Tommy Rifka Putra (born June 26, 1984, in Padang Panjang, West Sumatra), is an Indonesian former footballer who plays as a defender.

== Statistics ==
As of 14 May 2012.

Team	Season	Domestic League		Domestic Cup		Asia Competition^{1}		Other Tournaments^{2}		Total	
Team	Season	Apps	Goals	Apps	Goals	Apps	Goals	Apps	Goals	Apps	Goals
Persela Lamongan	2009–10	26	1	–		–		–		26	1
Semen Padang	2010–11	27	0	0	0	0	0	–		27	0
Semen Padang	2011–12	10	0	0	0	0	0	–		10	0
Total		63	1	0	0	0	0	0	0	63	1
