= Gusmiati Suid =

Indonesian choreographer (1942–2001)

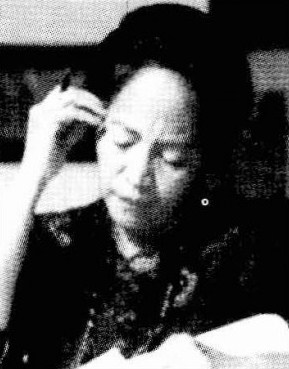
- Born: Gusmiati Suid; 16 August 1942; Parak Jua, Batusangkar, Tanah Datar, Japanese East Indies
- Died: 28 September 2001 (aged 59); Jakarta, Indonesia
- Occupation(s): Dancer, dance educator, visual artist

Gusmiati Suid (1942–2001) was an Indonesian dancer and choreographer who specialized in traditional Sumatran, Malay and Minang dances. She studied and later taught dance at the ASKI Performing Arts Academy in Padang Panjang. In 1984, she decided to become a professional choreographer, devoting her efforts to the Gumarang Sakti Dance Company which she had created in 1982. Gusmiati toured widely with the company in the late 1980s and the 1990s, visiting India, France, Germany, the United States, Canada and New Zealand. In her choreographic compositions from 1985 to 1991, she succeeded in combining martial arts-based dances with her own interpretations of Minang music.

== Biography ==
Born on 16 August 1942 in the village of Parak Jua, Batusangkar, West Sumatra, Gusmiati was the daughter of the schoolteachers Gasim Shahab, an Arab, and Asiah, a native Minang. In line with local Muslim traditions, she was brought up by her maternal uncle, Wahid Sampono Alam, who instructed her in the local martial arts or silat from the age of four. This provided her with a solid basis for her future career as a dancer.

When she was nine, the family moved to Padang Panjang. While attending school there, she was introduced to Melayu dances by Sofyan Naan. Later, while at junior high school, she was recognized as a good dancer with an interest in traditional performing arts. She went on to attend the SPG Vocational High School for Teachers where Mrs Huriah Adam inspired her to devote her life to dancing. In 1960, she began a teaching course specializing in Indonesian at FKIP Teachers College, graduating in 1964. She moved with her parents to Payakumbuh where she taught in a junior high school, forming an amateur dance group for her pupils where she choreographed her first short dances inspired by nature. In 1967, she returned to Batusangkar where she choreographed more short dances while teaching in another junior high school.

Gusmiati studied at the ASTI College of Traditional Performing Arts in Padang Panjang from 1972 to 1975. On graduating, she taught dance at a high school in Batusangkar and at a private school in Padang. In 1977, she created "Rantak", her first of her many significant dance compositions. From 1979 to 1981, she was an instructor at the Bunda Foundation dance group in Jakarta. In 1982, she moved back to Batusangkar where she founded the Gumarang Sakti Dance Company. The dances performed by the troupe were reworked in the Minang martial style but greater complexity. In 1985, she gave up her job as teacher in order to devote all her time to dance. From 1986, she and her family settled in Jakarta. Her two daughters, Suwita Yanti and Yessay Apriati danced in her troupe while her son, Yandi Yasin (known as Boi G. Sakti), studied dance at the Jakarta Institute of Arts.

After performing at the Asian Festival of Theatre and Martial Arts in Calcutta and at the Indonesian Festival of Choreography in Jakarta in 1987, she tool her troupe to Hong Kong (1989), France (1990) and the United States (1991). After performing at the Joyce Theatre in New York and representing her country at the Festival of Indonesia (KIAS), she was honoured with a Bessie, the New York Dance and Performance Award for "outstanding creative achievement... within and beyond the hallowed traditions of a great classical culture in Music and Dance of Sumatra: Aceh and Minangkabau. In 1992, Gusmiati and her troupe performed across Canada and at the Festival of Asian Arts in Hong Kong. Thereafter they performed in Germany (1994), New Zealand (1995), Thailand (1996) and Singapore (1997).

Gusmiati Suid died in Jakarta on 28 September 2001. Following her death, her son Boi G. Sakti continues to run the Gumarang Sakti Dance Company.
