= Minangkabau Culture Documentation and Information Center =

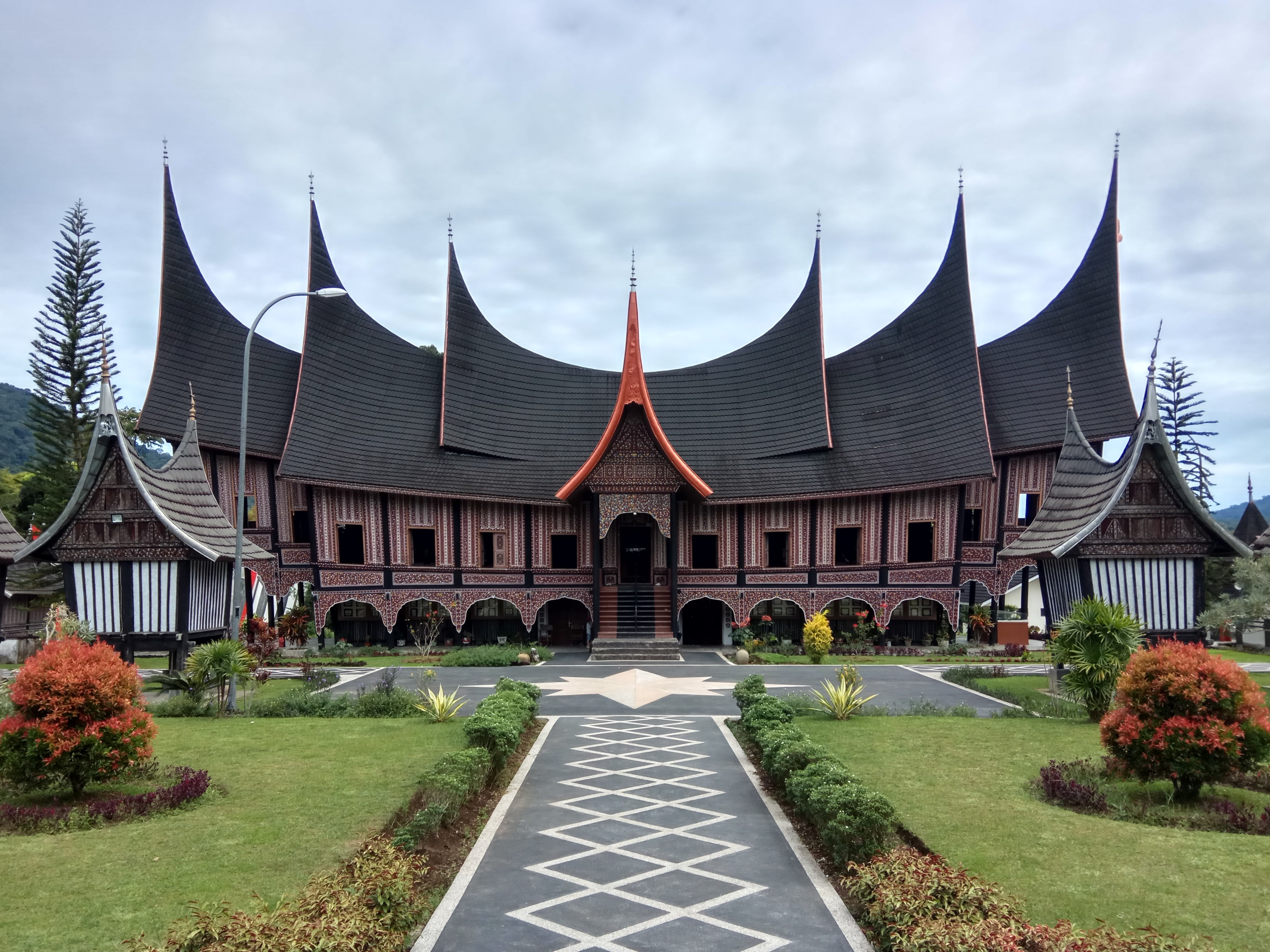
- Pusat Dokumentasi dan Informasi Kebudayaan Minangkabau (PDIKM)
- Established: 1990
- Location: Padang Panjang, West Sumatra, Indonesia
- Type: Museum and cultural center

Minangkabau Culture Documentation and Information Center (Indonesian: Pusat Dokumentasi dan Informasi Kebudayaan Minangkabau, or PDIKM) is a museum and research center for Minangkabau culture, located in the city of Padang Panjang, West Sumatra, Indonesia. The center building is in the form of a Minangkabau traditional house (rumah gadang), with a large garden that slopes up to the main gate.

== Establishment ==
The center was initiated by Bustanil Arifin and Abdul Hamid, in which the laying of the first stone began on August 8, 1988 and was formalized since December 19, 1990.

== Collections ==
The West Sumatran cultural collections that can be seen in this place include:

- Photographs of various regional wedding dresses
- Photographs of traditional leaders and matriarchs
- Photographs of national figures from the local origin
- Photographs of various types of traditional houses
- Photographs of historical objects from the ancient kingdom of Pagaruyung
- Books on Minangkabau which were published before 1942
- Ancient texts of Minangkabau
- Collection of newspaper clippings and microfilms
- Tapes of classic Minangkabau stories
- Replicas of traditional musical instruments

== See also ==
- Adityawarman Museum
