= Subiakto Tjakrawerdaya =

Indonesian politician (1944–2021)

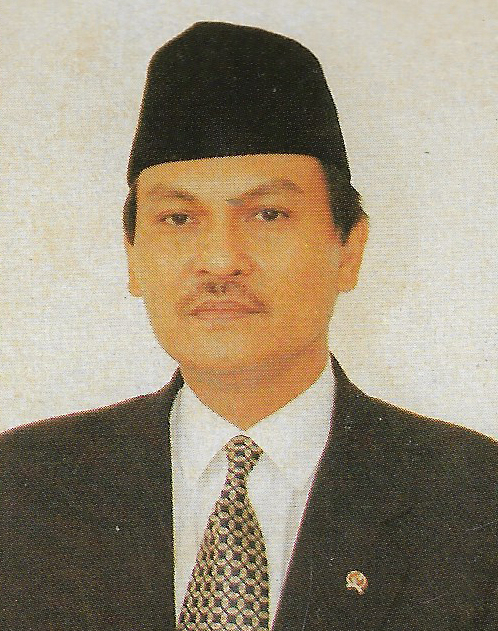

Minister of Cooperatives and Small Business
- In office 17 March 1993 – 21 May 1998
- President: Suharto
- Preceded by: Bustanil Arifin
- Succeeded by: Adi Sasono

Personal details
- Born: 10 August 1944 Cilacap, Japanese Dutch East Indies
- Died: 2 January 2021 (aged 76) Jakarta, Indonesia
- Party: National Awakening Party
- Other political affiliations: Golkar (before 1998)
- Spouse: Siti Milangoni
- Children: 3

Subiakto Tjakrawerdaya (10 August 1944 – 2 January 2021) was an Indonesian politician who served as the minister of cooperatives and small business in Suharto's sixth and seventh cabinets from 1993 until 1998.

== Early life and education ==
Subiakto Tjakrawerdaya was born on 10 August 1944, in the Cilacap Regency during the Japanese occupation of the Dutch East Indies. He was the son of a Javanese couple, Soewarko and Rudiastuti.

He began his elementary education in Cilacap in 1953, and graduated in 1956. He continued his study at the State Junior High School No. 1 in Cilacap from 1956 to 1959, and at the State High School No.1 in Cilacap from 1959 to 1962. After he finished high school, he moved to Jakarta and enrolled at the Faculty of Economics of the Christian University of Indonesia, where he was accepted as a student and studied in the university from 1962 until 1972.

== Career ==
After graduating from the university, Tjakrawerdaya began his career as a board member of a private business. He left that position in 1978 to pursue a career in the Junior Ministry of Cooperation, starting as an expert staff member to the Junior Minister.

When the ministry was transformed into a full department, he was promoted in 1983 to become the Head of the Planning Bureau for the Department of Cooperation. He was promoted once again in September 1987, this time to Director General of Cooperative Business Development within the same department.

=== Further education ===
Tjakrawerdaya enrolled at the National Resilience Institute in 1985. He graduated in 1986 as one of the three best graduates.

== Minister of Cooperatives and Small Business ==
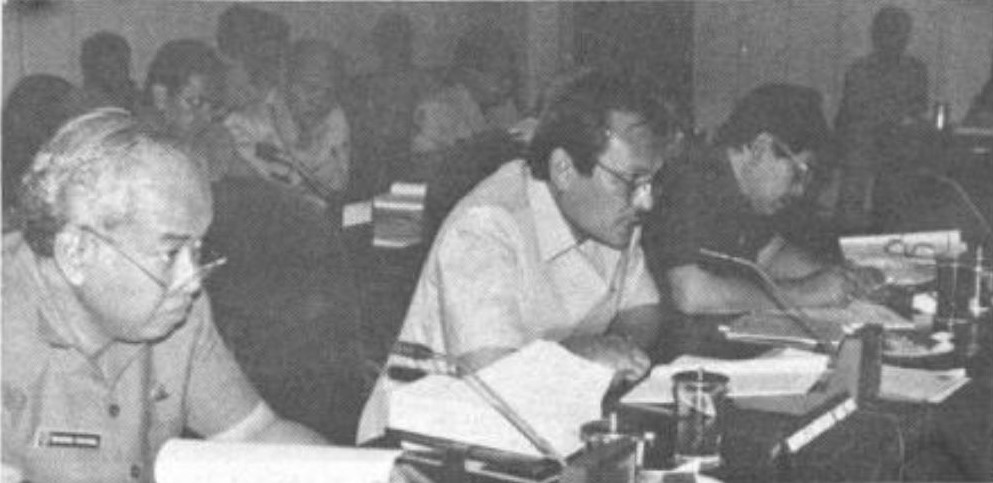
Subiakto Tjakrawerdaya (middle) on a meeting with Commission VII of the People's Representative Council

On 17 March 1993, President Suharto announced the composition of his sixth cabinet to the public. Suharto included Subiakto Tjakrawerdaya as the Minister of Cooperatives and Small Business in his cabinet. After the cabinet's term expired, he was appointed again for the same position in Suharto's seventh cabinet on 14 March 1998 until Suharto resigned on 21 May 1998.

During his term as minister, Tjakrawerdaya was closely associated with Suharto's children and their businesses. Tjakrawerdaya allowed Tommy Suharto, Suharto's youngest son, to exercise monopoly on the clove trade in Indonesia.

In 1996, Tjakrawerdaya ran as a candidate for the People's Representative Council in the Lampung constituency. Tjakrawerdaya won a seat and became a member of the People's Representative Council since 1 October 1997. Since then, Tjakrawerdaya concurrently held office as a minister and an MP. He relieved his membership in the People's Representative Council after his second appointment as minister.

== Later political career ==
After Suharto resigned, the National Awakening Party was formed two months later. Tjakrawerdaya joined the party and became the Regional Delegate of the People's Consultative Assembly to represent the party from East Java. He held the office from 1 October 1999 until his arrest on 18 March 2002.

On 30 November 1999, President Abdurrahman Wahid formed the National Economic Council to resolve Indonesia's financial crisis. Tjakrawerdaya was included as the deputy chairman of the council. Tjakrawerdaya's membership in the council was protested by economists from University of Indonesia and Gadjah Mada University due to his previous office as minister in Suharto's cabinet. Wahid responded by stating that the council is an advisory body and could not directly influence any presidential decisions.

At the 2004 Indonesian legislative election, Tjakrawerdaya nominated himself as the member of the Regional Representative Council for the Central Java constituency, number 25. Tjakrawerdaya went in the 16th place and obtained 315,191 votes — 2.01% of the total votes — in the election. He did not win any seats in the election.

== Arrest ==
Tjakrawerdaya was accused of corrupting funds totalling 20 trillion rupiahs from the Employees Cooperative of the Cooperatives Department. He was brought to the Jakarta Police headquarters on the morning of 18 March 2002 and was investigated for 13 hours. He was arrested that night.

== Death ==
Subiakto Tjakrawerdaya tested positive for COVID-19 during the COVID-19 pandemic in Indonesia and was brought to the Simprug Extension Hospital, a temporary hospital built by the Pertamina Central Hospital to treat COVID-19 patients. Tjakrawerdaya died at 23:15 on 2 January 2021, at the hospital.

== Awards ==
Subiakto was awarded the Development Medal (Satyalancana Pembangunan) in 1986.
