= Minang =

Minang may refer to:

== Sumatra ==
- Minangkabau people, an ethnic group in Sumatra
- Padang cuisine or Minang food, the cuisine of the Minangkabau people
- Minangkabau language, or Minang language, the language spoken by the Minangkabau people

== Australia ==
- Mineng, also spelled Minang, an Indigenous people of Australia
- Mineng language, or Minang, a dialect of Noongar

== See also ==
- Minangkabau (disambiguation)
