= 1979 eruption of Mount Marapi =

Volcanic eruption in West Sumatra, Indonesia

- Volcano: Mount Marapi
- Date: 30 April 1979
- Location: West Sumatra, Indonesia; 0.3800°S 100.4742°E
- Impact: 80 (possibly up to 100) deaths, many injured

On 30 April 1979, Mount Marapi, a complex volcano on the Indonesian island of Sumatra and the most active complex volcano in West Sumatra province, erupted, killing between 80 and 100 people.

Due to its proximity to populated areas, the volcano is recognised as a significant hazard.

== Events ==
The 1979 eruption followed earthquakes and torrential rain. Due to either the rain or a gas explosion in the interior of the volcano, tons of rock broke out of the crater wall and rolled down the volcano's slopes. Mountain streams became blocked, causing floods that swept away roads, bridges, seven villages and hundreds of houses. Rice fields were buried under mud, uprooted trees and pieces of stone. In the village of Pasir Lawas, 20 bodies were found and 40 houses were destroyed by mud and boulders. Rescue work was hampered by extensive damage to roads, buildings and rice fields.

It was the second volcanic eruption in Indonesia in 1979, after the 1979 eruption of Sinila crater of the Dieng Volcanic Complex on Java in February. On the plateau near the Sinila crater, 149 people died of gas poisoning in Pekisaran village.

== See also ==
- List of volcanoes in Indonesia
- 2023 eruption of Mount Marapi
- List of volcanic eruptions by death toll
