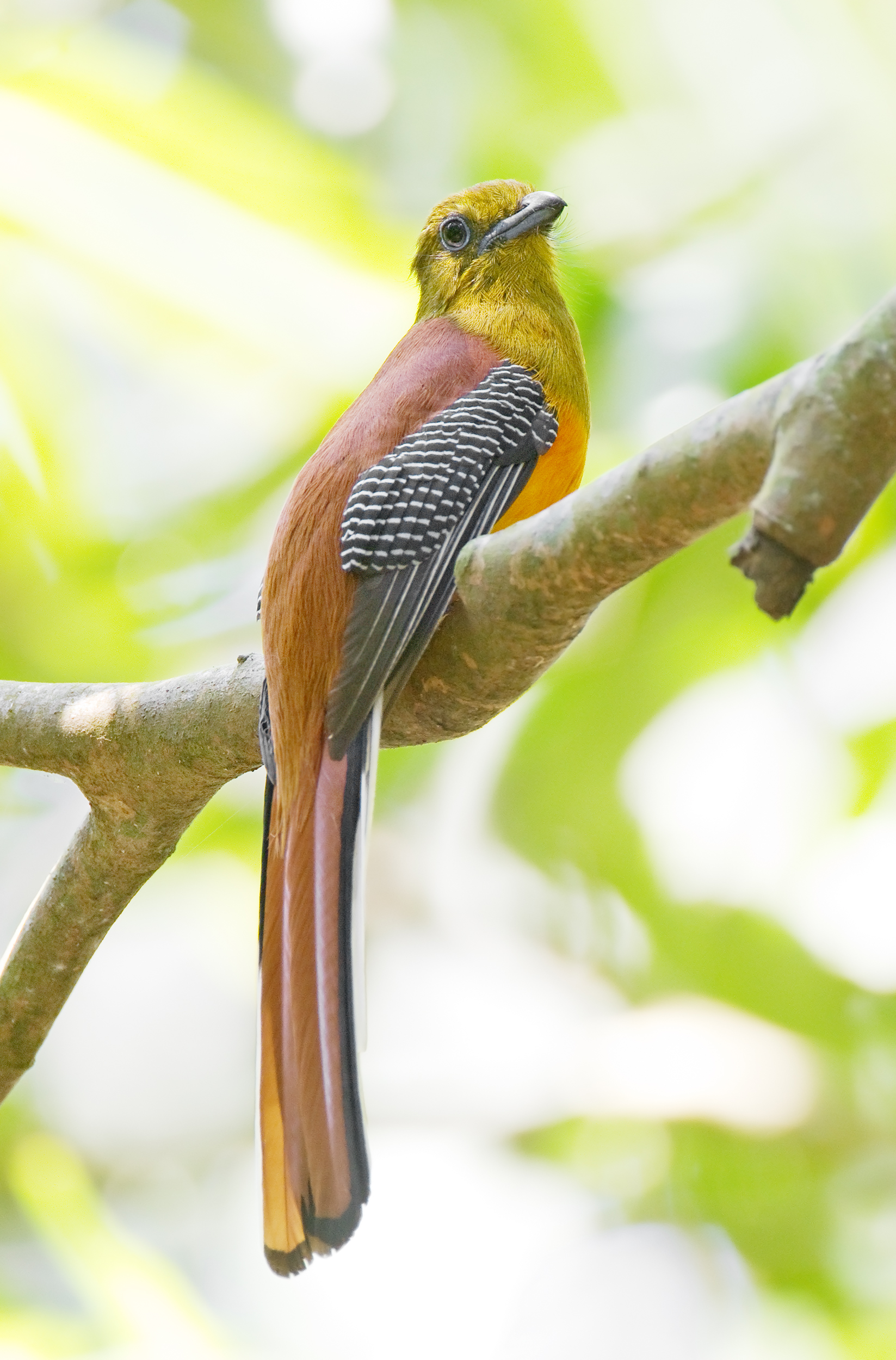

Conservation status
- Least Concern (IUCN 3.1)

Scientific classification
- Kingdom: Animalia
- Phylum: Chordata
- Class: Aves
- Order: Trogoniformes
- Family: Trogonidae
- Genus: Harpactes
- Species: H. oreskios

Binomial name
- Harpactes oreskios (Temminck, 1823)

Synonyms
- Trogon oreskios Temminck, 1823; Harpactes dulitensis Ogilvie-Grant, 1892

= Orange-breasted trogon =

Species of bird

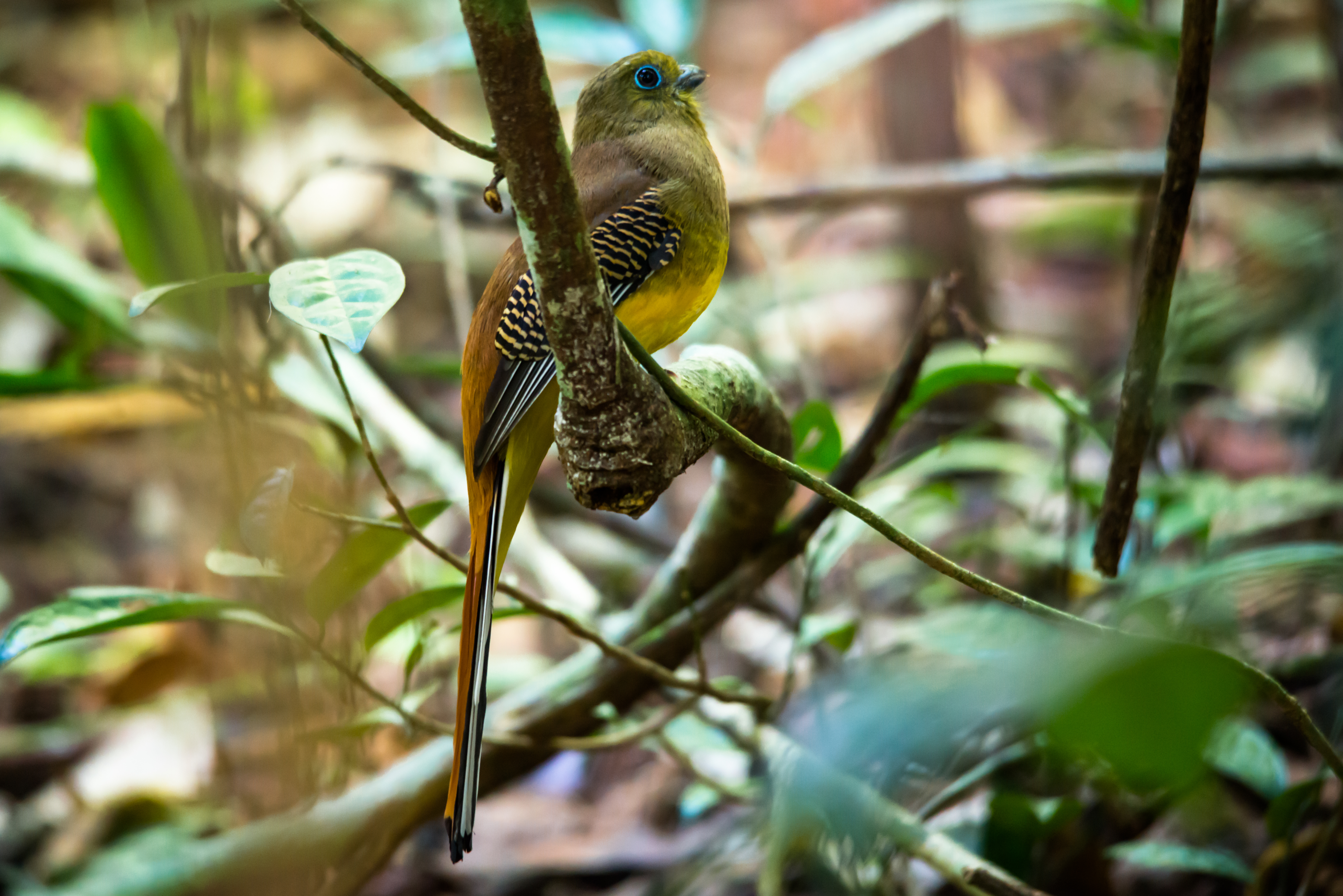
In Khao Yai National Park

The orange-breasted trogon (Harpactes oreskios) is a species of bird in the family Trogonidae. It is a colorful, sedentary species that inhabits the lower canopy of the lowlands and forest of southern China, southeast Asia, Borneo, Sumatra and Java.

The species is insectivorous and hunts from a perch. Adults breed between January and May, excavating their nest into dead tree stumps. Both parents cooperate in raising the chicks.

== Taxonomy ==
The orange-breasted trogon is a member of the order Trogoniformes, in the family Trogonidae, which is a relatively small family made up of 39 tropical species. The genus Harpactes contains the Asian trogons. H. oreskios is the sister group of the Philippine trogon (Harpactes ardens) and Diard's trogon (Harpactes diardii).

Five subspecies are recognized:

- H. o. stellae Deignan, 1941 – southwest China, south Myanmar and Indochina
- H. o. uniformis (Robinson, 1917) – Malay Peninsula and Sumatra
- H. o. oreskios (Temminck, 1823) – Java
- H. o. dulitensis Ogilvie-Grant, 1892 – Borneo
- H. o. nias Meyer de Schauensee & Ripley, 1940 – Nias (west of north Sumatra)

== Description ==
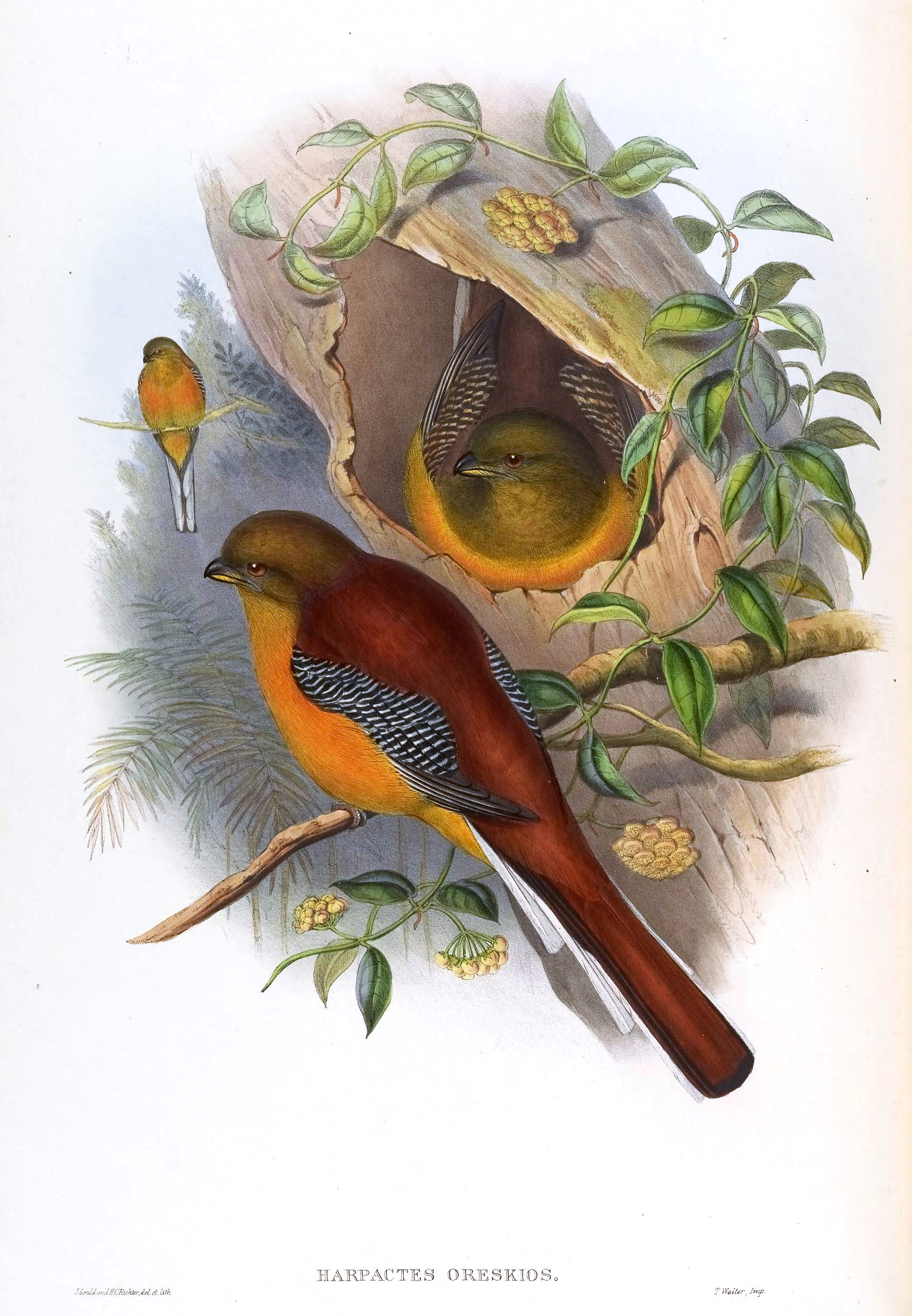
Painting by John Gould

The orange-breasted trogon is a medium-sized bird that measures between 25 and 31 cm in length and weighs about 49 to 57 g. The males have a dull olive-yellow head and a rufous-chestnut colour that extends from the upperparts to the upperpart of the tail. Underneath the tail the body is black and white. Primaries are black with white vertical bars and wing coverts are barred black. There is a yellow-orange lower breast which becomes lighter as it approaches the vent. A blue eye ring is present. The females has a more grey-brown head and upperparts, and a grey breast with yellow at the belly and vent. Both sexes have grey feet with two toes pointing backwards, a common trait among trogons.

The subspecies can differ slightly from each other; uniformis and dulitensis are smaller than the other subspecies and have, respectively, a more yellow or green breast; nias has a darker crown and a larger bill that the others; stellae has a paler breast and longer tail.

== Distribution and habitat ==
The different subspecies of the orange-breasted trogon can be found in southern China, Laos, Thailand, peninsular Malaysia, Borneo, Sumatra, Java, and Nias. H. o. stellae is found form southern China and Myanmar to Indochina; H. o. uniformis is found from southern Thailand and peninsular Malaysia to Sumatra; H. o. nias occurs in Nias; H. o. dulitensis occurs in Borneo; and H. o. oreskios occurs in Java.

The species does not migrate. Its natural habitats are subtropical or tropical moist lowland forests and montane forests, humid, lower-to-middle elevation evergreen forests, swampy forests, open dry forests, bamboo forests, thin tree jungles, and sometimes clumps of trees near forests. In Thailand, peninsular Malaysia, and Borneo, Sumatra and Java they occupy the lowlands at 1100 m, 1300 m, 300–1500 m and 1200 m respectively. In Nias, they occupy low secondary jungle.

== Ecology ==
=== Vocalization ===
Generally, the song will start with a 1–3 note "to (to to)" then 3–4 even-pitched "tau-tau-tau". The different subspecies might have a slightly different song; the male song of H. o. stellae a five note kek tau-tau-tau-tau-tau with a repeated harsh kek-kek.

=== Diet ===
The species is insectivorous. When foraging, the orange-breasted trogon uses the "sally-stall" technique. This consists of pursuing the prey from a perch and then momentarily stalling in front of it with a fluttering motion before seizing it. It can forage from a height of 4.3–13.7 m, most commonly at about 9.5 m. Diet items comprise various arthropods: Phasmatodea, Orthoptera and Lepidoptera larvae.

=== Reproduction ===
The period of breeding is different between the different subspecies but on average lasts 2–3 months between January and May. The nest is created by excavating a shallow cavity in the side or on top of a rotten stumps or dead tree limb on an otherwise healthy tree. This is a joint effort from both male and female, where they work in rotation; when one is excavating, the other is perched nearby.

The female lays a clutch of 2–3 eggs. Responsibility of incubation is alternated with the male; males tend to incubate during the day and females overnight. The incubation period lasts around 17–18 days. Eggs are smooth with an oval shape and colored dirty ivory or pale olive, with no markings.

The nestling period is around 12–14 days. Males plays more dominant role in provisioning nestlings than the females; in many cases the male passes food to the female before it is given to the nestlings, rather than feeding them directly.

The species breeds outside the peak availability period for its food items, which is 4–5 months earlier. This may be due to avoidance of the breeding period of the larger red-headed trogon, which competes with the orange-breasted trogon for food.

== Conservation ==
The orange-breasted trogon is classified as Least Concern by the IUNC, however population sizes are decreasing. The species is mostly present in protected areas throughout its range. Current research into the causes of decline is lacking.
