= Bustanil Arifin =

Indonesian politician

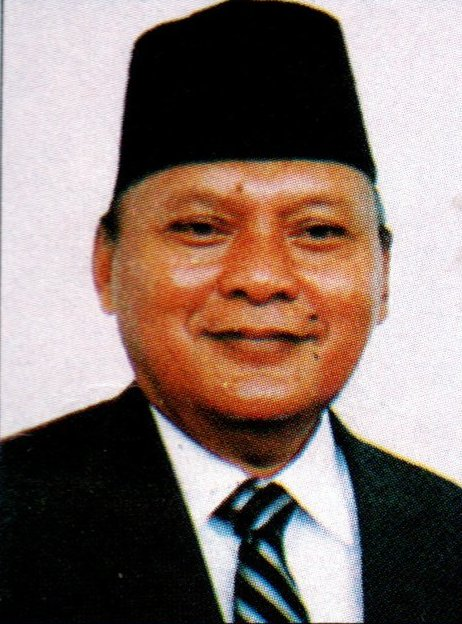

2nd Minister of Cooperatives and Small Businesses
- In office 22 April 1978 – 17 March 1993
- President: Suharto
- Preceded by: Subroto
- Succeeded by: Subiakto Tjakrawerdaya

1st [[Head of State Logistics Agency]]
- In office 29 March 1978 – 17 March 1993
- Preceded by: office created
- Succeeded by: Ibrahim Hasan

Personal details
- Born: October 10, 1925 Padang Panjang, West Sumatra, Dutch East Indies
- Died: February 13, 2011 (aged 85) Los Angeles, United States
- Children: 4, including Alwin Arifin and Emil Arifin
- Education: Padjadjaran University

Military service
- Branch/service: Indonesian Army
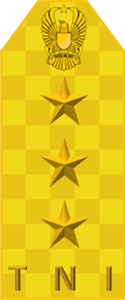
- Rank: Lieutenant General TNI
- NRP: 15046

Bustanil Arifin (10 October 1925 – 13 February 2011) was an Indonesian politician. He held posts as the Head of the Logistics Department and as Minister of Cooperation in Indonesia.

Arifin received a bachelor's degree in law from Padjadjaran University. He was married to R.A. Suhardani.
