= Padang Panjang =

City in West Sumatra, Indonesia

- City
- City of Padang Panjang; Kota Padang Panjang
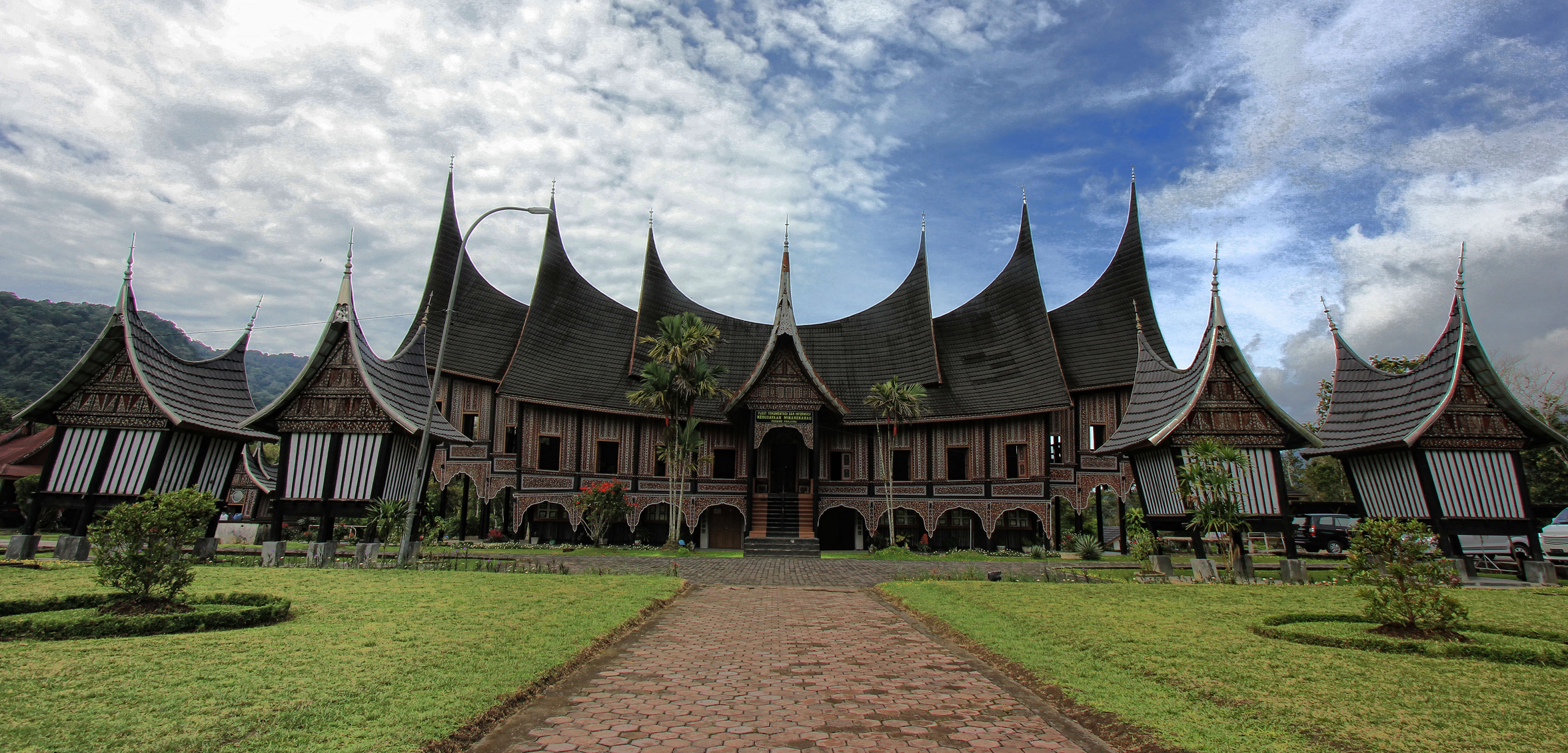
- A traditional Minangkabau rumah gadang ("big house") in Padang Panjang

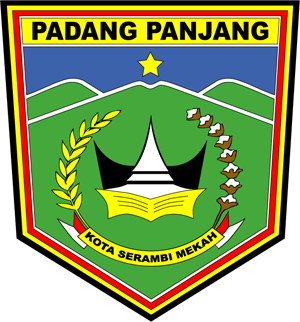
- Coat of arms
- Nickname: Egypte van Andalas (Egypt of Andalas)
- Motto: Padang Panjang Kota Serambi Mekah (Indonesian: Padang Panjang The Courtyard of Mecca)
- Location within West Sumatra

- Location in West Sumatra and Indonesia Padang Panjang (Indonesia)
- Coordinates: 0°27′S 100°25′E
- Country: Indonesia
- Province: West Sumatra

Government
  - Mayor: Hendri Arnis
  - Vice Mayor: Allex Saputra

Area
  - Total: 23.00 km^{2} (8.88 sq mi)

Population (mid 2025 estimate)
  - Total: 60,264
  - Density: 2,620/km^{2} (6,786/sq mi)
- Time zone: UTC+7 (Indonesia Western Time)
- Area code: (+62) 752
- Website: portal.padangpanjang.go.id

Padang Panjang (sometimes written as Padangpanjang, and spelt as Padang Pandjang in the Dutch East Indies era, lit. 'long field', Jawi: ڤادڠ ڤنجڠ) is a city located at 0°27′S 100°25′E in the highlands of West Sumatra, around 70 km inland from the provincial capital Padang. It sits on a plateau beneath the volcanoes Mount Marapi and Mount Singgalang, thus creating cooler temperatures. It was a popular tourist destination during Dutch rule in Indonesia, and it later became one of the centres of Islamic education in Sumatra.

Home to a famous performing arts conservatorium, Institut Seni Indonesia Padang Panjang (Indonesian Art Institute Padang Panjang), the town stretches up the hill from the marketplace and central mosque to the soccer field and bus terminal up to ISI. The main road through Padang Panjang links coastal Padang and the highland capital, Bukittinggi. The city is also home to the Minangkabau Cultural Documentation and Information Center (Indonesian: Pusat Dokumentasi dan Informasi Kebudayaan Minangkabau or PDIKM). It covers a land area of 23 km^{2}, and in 2025 had a population of 60,264 (comprising 30,279 males and 29,985 females).

== Name ==
There are many versions of the origin of the name Padang Panjang. Some historical accounts confused Padang Panjang with Nagari Padang Panjang in Pariangan, Tanah Datar, as one of the earlier Minangkabau settlements after they came down from the peak of Mount Marapi. From Tambo, folklore, or historical accounts of nearby Minangkabau nagaris in Batipuh, X Koto and XI Koto, the area that is now known as Padang Panjang was a vast land called "Tanah Padang Nan Panjang Sari Menanti" (Long Plain Land that is beautiful and waiting for people to come). The plain was a savanna filled with tall weeds; thus, it was readily used for human settlements. Soon, Tanah Padang Nan Panjang Sari Menanti shortened into Padang Panjang Sari Menanti. Later, it was only Padang Panjang because Sari Menanti was used to call another settlement that was opened in the hinterland of Malaya, which is known as the royal town of Negeri Sembilan, Malaysia. The town is also known as Kota Hujan (Indonesian for Rainy City), and as Egypt van Andalas or Egypt van Sumatra because of the role it has played as an Islamic education hub with various Islamic schools and pesantren since the Dutch colonial era.

== Government ==
The city was created by Law No. 8 of 1956 on the Formation of the Autonomous Cities in the Regional Central Sumatra Province as an enclave situated geographically within the Tanah Datar Regency. It has an area of 23.0 km^{2}. The current mayor who heads the executive body of the city is Hendra Arnis, and the vice mayor is Allex Saputra. They were elected in 2025 after winning Indonesia's local elections in 2024. The city also has a municipal legislative body called Dewan Perwakilan Rakyat Daerah (DPRD or Regional House of Representatives) Padang Panjang, consisting of 20 local elective representatives. The current head of the legislative body is Imbral.

=== Administrative districts ===
Padang Panjang city consists of two districts (kecamatan), tabulated below with their areas and population totals from the 2010 Census and the 2020 Census, together with the official estimates as of mid 2025. The table also includes the locations of the district administrative centres and their postal codes.

Name of District (kecamatan)	Area in km^{2}	Pop'n Census 2010	Pop'n Census 2020	Pop'n Estimate mid 2025	Admin centre	Post codes
Padang Panjang Barat (West Padang Panjang)	9.75	27,637	32,160	33,924	Kampung Manggis	27111 -27118
Padang Panjang Timur (East Padang Panjang)	13.25	19,371	24,151	26,340	Ngalau	27121 -27128
Totals	23.00	47,008	56,311	60,264		

=== Administrative subdistricts (kelurahan) ===
West Padang Panjang District consists of the 8 subdistricts (kelurahan) of Silaing Bawah, Silaing Atas, Pasar Usang, Kampung Manggis, Tanah Hitam, Pasar Baru, Bukit Surungan and Balai-Balai. East Padang Panjang District comprises the 8 villages of Koto Panjang, Koto Katik, Ngalau, Ekor Lubuk, Sigando, Ganting, Guguk Malintang and Tanah Pak Lambik.

== Demographics ==
The city had a population at the 2010 Census of 47,008 and 56,311 at the 2020 Census; the official estimate as at mid 2025 was 60,264 (comprising 30,279 males and 29,985 females).

=== Ethnicity ===
The original inhabitants of Padang Panjang are the local Minangkabau, particularly clans of nearby Luhak Tanah Datar and Luhak Agam in the Minangkabau highlands. According to Tambo (local folklore), these native Minangkabau migrated from the east from Luhak Tanah Datar (around the city of Batusangkar today), then moved to Batipuh and IV Koto (inhabiting nagaris such as Gunung, Jaho, Tambangan and Paninjauan). Some of them migrated from the north in Luhak Agam. Then they resettled in the nearby area of VI Koto (in nagari such as Koto Baru, Pandai Sikek, Air Angek, Koto Laweh, Panyalaian and Singgalang). As Padang Panjang grew as an important economic, political, and educational hub, it attracted many diasporas of other communities, such as Europeans, Javanese, Bataks, Nias, Chinese Indonesians, Arabs and Indians. These newcomers tended to live within their tight-knit community, resulting in their distinct neighbourhoods being named after their community, such as Kampung Jawa, Kampung Cina (Chinatown), Kampung Nias and Kampung Keling (Little India).

=== Language ===
As Padang Panjang is a city and second-level local government in Indonesia, Indonesian language is the official language for government affairs and the language of instruction in schools. In contrast, the Minangkabau language is used for daily communication in public spaces and between different ethnic groups living in the city.

== Education ==
Padang Panjang offers a wide range of education services through public and private institutions, from preschool to higher education. It also offered community education. There are also modern Pesantren Islamic boarding schools in the city, such as Pondok Pesantren Kauman Muhammadiyah Padang Panjang, Pondok Pesantren Thawalib Putera and Puteri, Pondok Pesantren Thawalib Gunung, Pesantren Terpadu Serambi Mekah and Perguruan Diniyyah Puteri Padang Panjang.

The city hosts the Indonesia Institute of the Arts Padang Panjang (Institut Seni Indonesia Yogyakarta, ISI Padang Panjang). It is the only public higher education institution in Padang Panjang. It teaches humanities, visual, performing and media arts for undergraduate, postgraduate and doctoral programs mainly in Minangkabau and Malay culture.

Formal education	Public and private Kindergarten, Playgroup, Daycare & Others	Public and private Primary School and Madrasa	Public and private Lower Secondary School and Madrasa	Public and private High School and Vocational School	Public and private Sekolah Luar Biasa (Special Schools)	Public and private Community Education providers	Public and private Higher Education providers
Number	59	20	40	20	6	7	5
Public and private education providers in Padang Panjang; Source: Pusdatin Kemendikdasmen RI 2025

== Tourism ==
Tourism in Padang Panjang is heavily influenced by its role as a transportation and education hub between larger cities/regions in West Sumatra. During the Dutch colonial era, Padang Panjang served as a transportation hub for people and goods from the cities on the western coast of Sumatera into Minangkabau's hinterland through narrow Anai Valley passes. All exported goods from cities such as Padang and Pariaman entered Minangkabau through this choke point, and they were traded with native goods such as tobacco, coals and other local spices. The opening of the first rail network from Padang to Padang Panjang in 1891 by Staatsspoorwegen ter Sumatra's Westkust, a division of the Dutch colonial-owned railway enterprise in the colony, expedited the progress. It also accelerated the volume of people who wanted to pursue education, mainly Islamic education, in progressive native Islamic educational institutions in the city.

Padang Panjang offers cultural tourism through the government-managed museum and research centre, Minangkabau Culture Documentation and Information Center (Indonesian: Pusat Dokumentasi dan Informasi Kebudayaan Minangkabau or PDIKM), where tourists can learn the rich history and culture of Minangkabau people through books, photographs and older archives. Nearby, there is an amusement water park called Minang Fantasy or Mifan, which is blended with the traditional houses of the Minangkabau people. Local tourist villages, such as Desa Wisata Kubu Gadang, are also available to explore, where tourists can experience how local Minangkabau live in their villages.

Padang Panjang attracts Muslim tourists who want to learn how the city played a crucial role in the Islamic educational hub in Sumatra, Indonesia and regional Southeast Asia. Tourists can visit well-established institutions such as Perguruan Diniyyah Puteri Padang Panjang and Sumatera Thawalib.

Due to its cool temperature, the city also presents strong culinary traditions, particularly from the local Minangkabau cuisine. The city hosts famous Nasi Padang dan Sate Padang restaurants. The yellow-coloured sauce of Sate Padang is, in fact, developed here. The famous night street food bazaar opposite the M. Syafei Building is the main tourist attraction at night.

== Town without cigarette advertisements ==
Since 2008, Padang Panjang is the only city in Indonesia without cigarette advertisements. Smoking is prohibited in public areas, public transport, and youth facilities. In other areas, smoking is restricted to smoking rooms. In 2014, some pulmonologists wished to transfer to other towns because of the lack of patients.

== In popular culture ==
Padang Panjang is a background for numerous literary fiction, particularly early Indonesian literature. Haji Abdul Malik Karim Amrullah, or famously known as Hamka, one of Indonesia's celebrated writers, novelists and Islamic scholars, used Padang Panjang as the background of his literary works, particularly Di Bawah Lindungan Ka'bah and the Tenggelamnya Kapal van der Wijck, both later adapted into two different movies in 2011 and later in 2013.

== Notable people ==
- Arifin Bey, diplomat, editor, teacher, author
- Bustanil Arifin, Indonesian politician and philanthropist
- Sri Owen, food writer and cook who introduced Indonesian cuisine to the English-speaking world
- Tommy Rifka Putra, footballer
- Rahmah el Yunusiyah, women's education activist and member of the Indonesian parliament
- Sutan Sjahrir, Indonesian politician and independence revolutionary leader
- Daan Jahja, Indonesian freedom fighter and military officer
- Gatot Soebroto, Indonesian Javanese national hero and military officer who spent his military education in Padang Panjang during Dutch rule in Indonesia
- A.A. Navis, leading Indonesian author, poet, cultural critic and politician
- Ismail al-Khalidi al-Minangkabawi, Indonesian Islamic scholar
- Huriah Adam, famous Indonesian dance artist
- Gusmiati Suid, Indonesian dancer and choreographer who specialized in traditional Sumatran, Malay and Minang dances
- Mochtar Apin, leading Indonesian painter, illustrator, writer and art lecturer

== Gallery ==
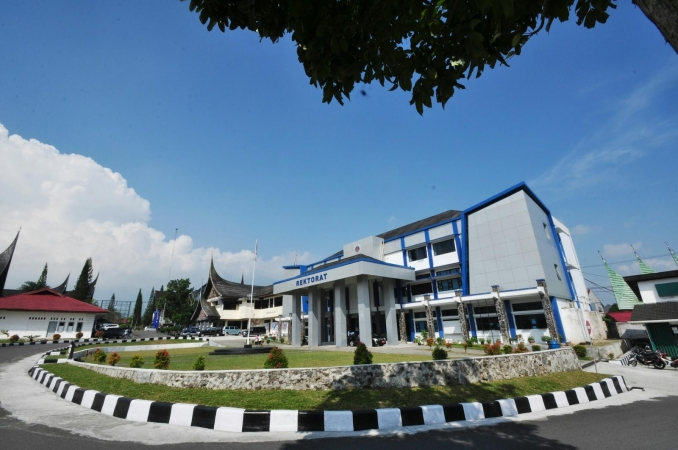
Rectorate building of the ISI (Institut Seni Indonesia) Padang Panjang, previously it was called STSI (Sekolah Tinggi Seni Indonesia) Padang Panjang

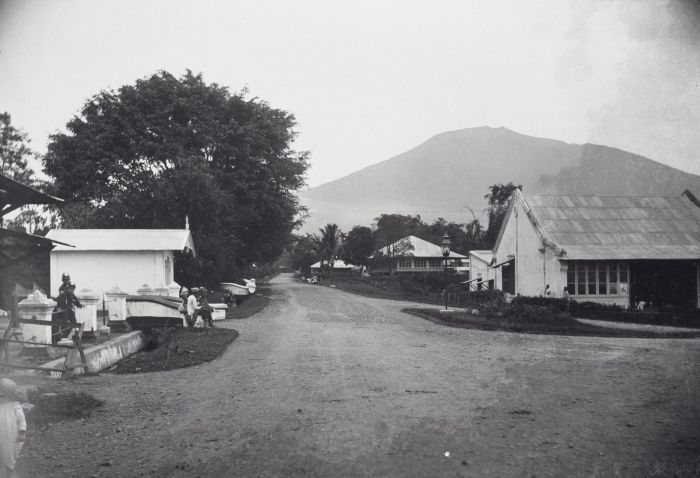
Street scenery in Padang Panjang in colonial times, with Mount Marapi

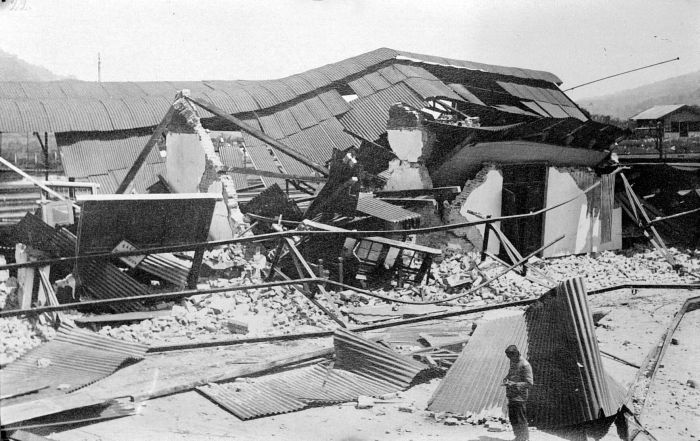
The 1926 Padang Panjang earthquakes

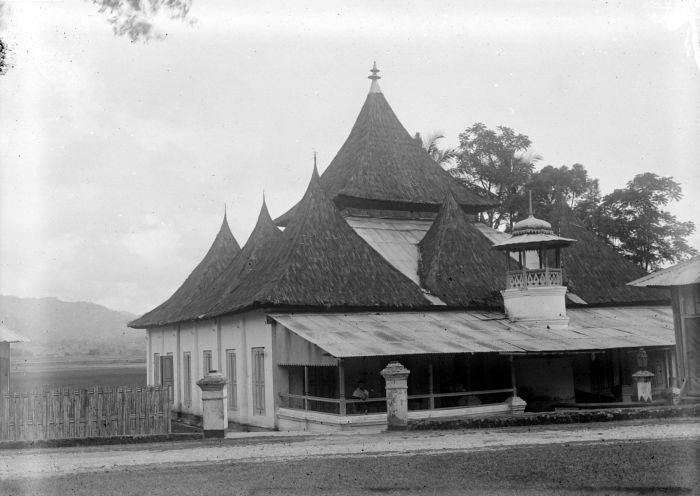
Minangkabau mosque in Padang Panjang year 1912

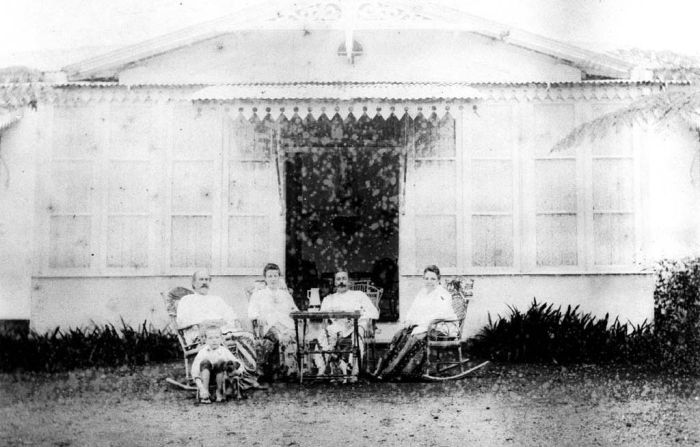
Europeans sitting before the house of the resident of Padang Panjang in 1900

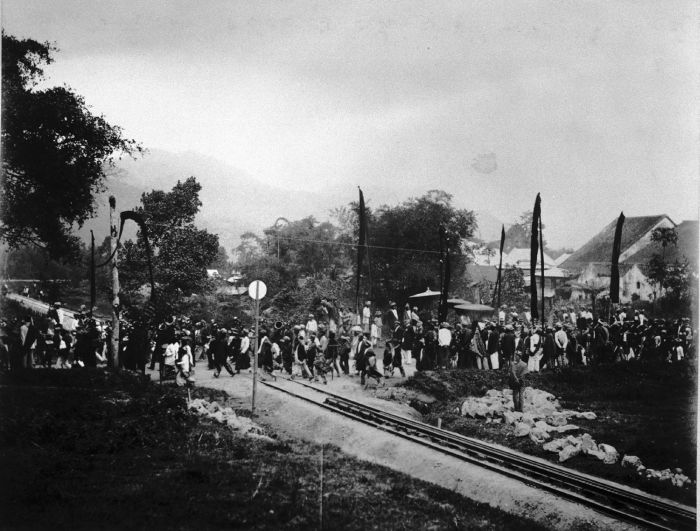
Opening of the railway line in Padang Panjang in 1895

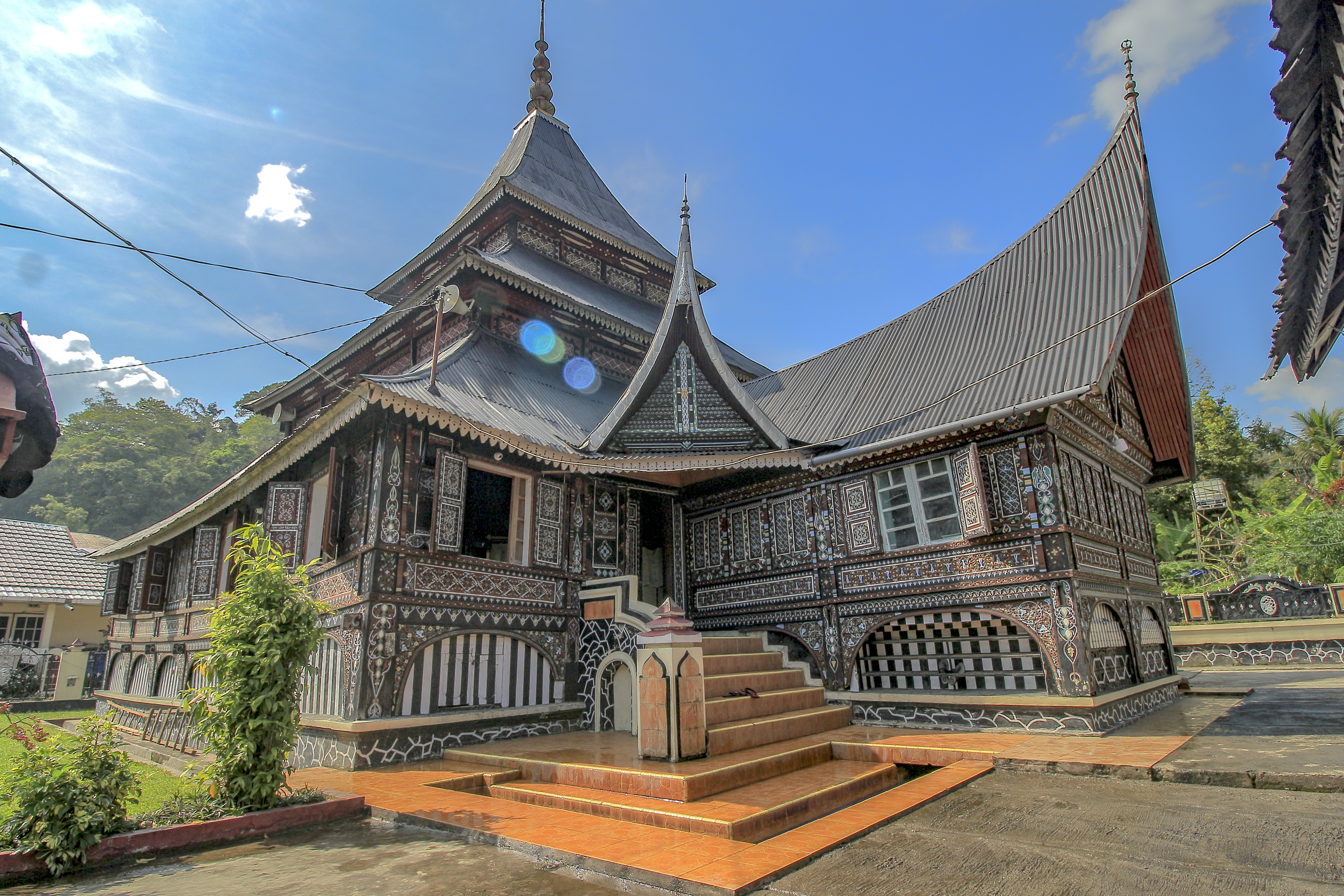
Asasi Mosque in Sigando is the oldest mosque in Padang Panjang

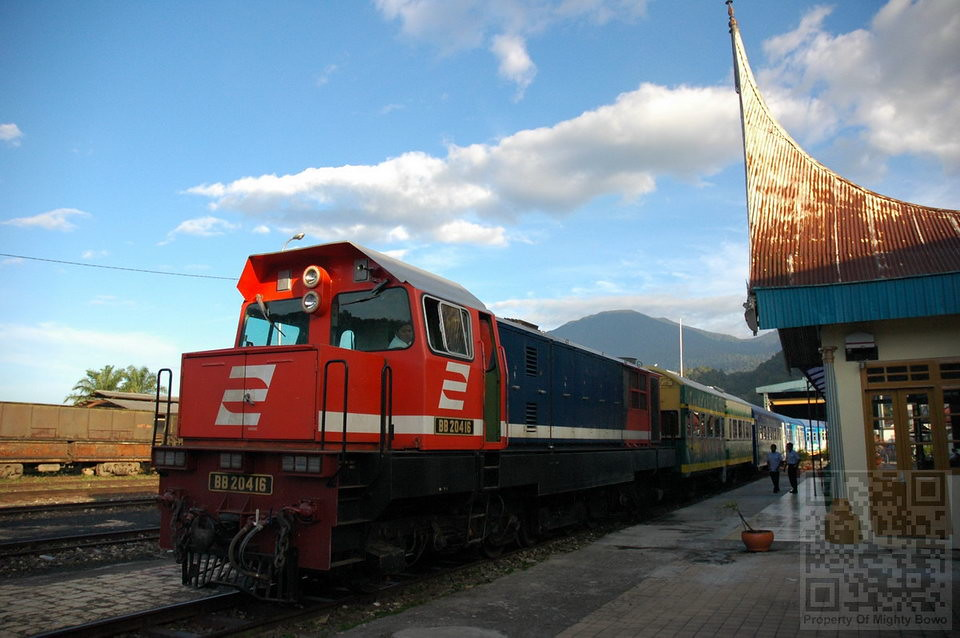
A tourist train serving Padang Panjang-Sawahlunto stationed in Padang Panjang Railway Station

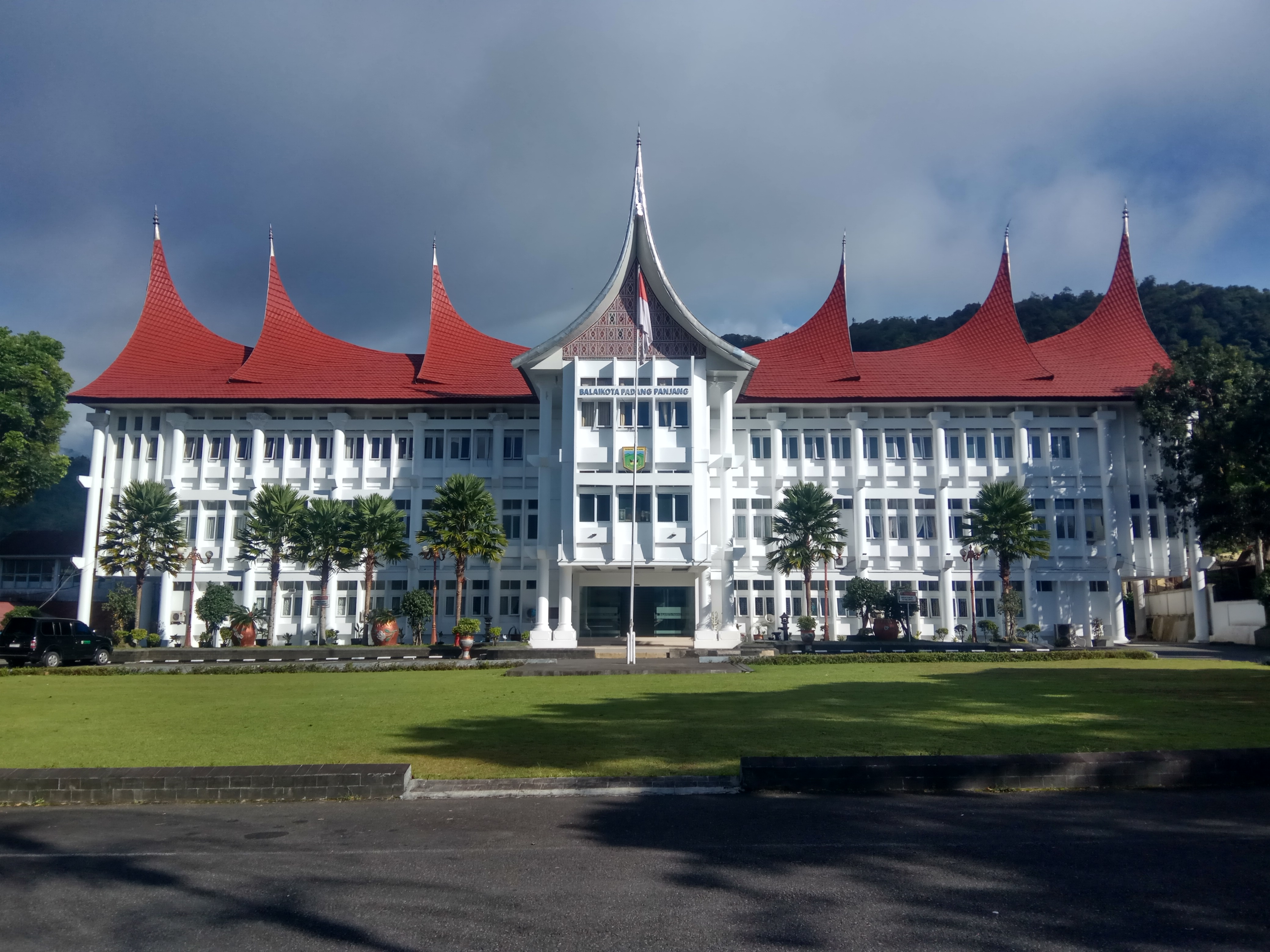
Padang Panjang City Hall in Silaing Bawah is the seat of mayor and vice mayor

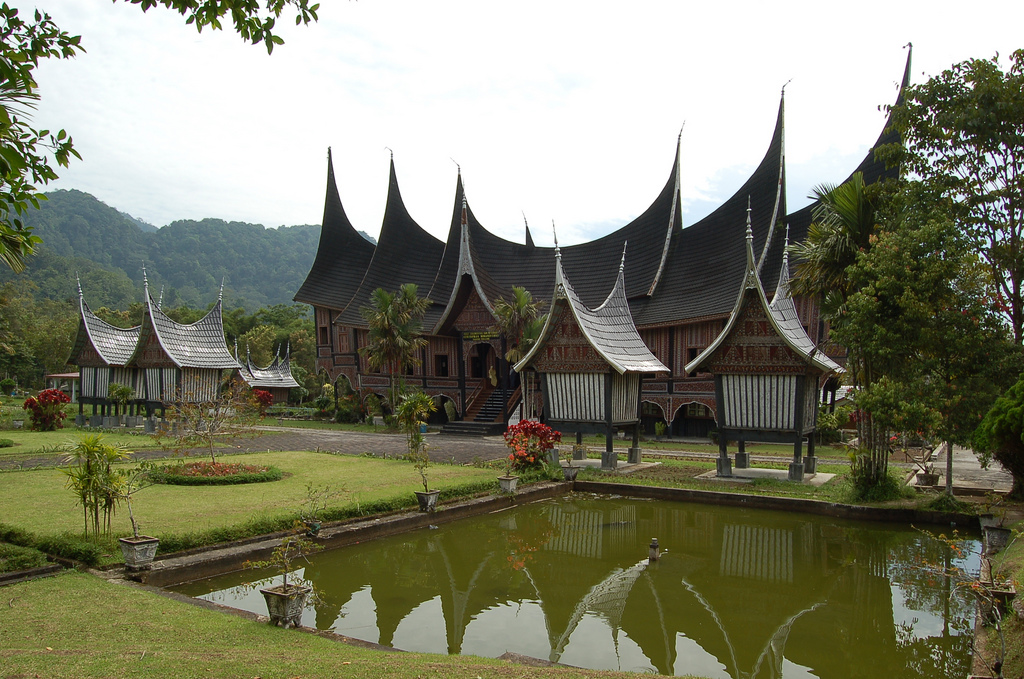
Main building of Minangkabau Culture Documentation and Information Center
