= Adi Sasono =

Indonesian politician

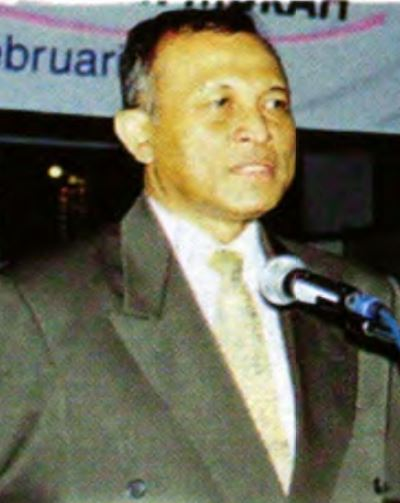
- Adi Sasono

Minister of Cooperatives, Small and Medium Businesses
- In office 23 May 1998 – 20 October 1999
- President: B. J. Habibie
- Preceded by: Subiakto Tjakrawerdaya
- Succeeded by: Zarkasih Nur

Personal details
- Born: 16 February 1943 Pekalongan, Central Java, Dutch East Indies
- Died: 13 August 2016 (aged 73) Lebak Bulus, South Jakarta, Indonesia
- Spouse: Mala Maria Adi Sasono
- Children: Arya Wibisono, Aji Erlangga, Dewi Saraswati, Aditya Krisnamurty and Gita Aryanti
- Education: Teknik Sipil ITB

Adi Sasono (16 February 1943 – 13 August 2016) was an Indonesian politician. He served as the Minister of Cooperatives, Small and Medium Businesses from 1998 to 1999 within the Development Reform Cabinet of President B. J. Habibie.

Adi Sasono was born on 16 February 1943, in Pekalongan, Central Java, in present-day Indonesia. He died at Mayapada Hospital in Lebak Bulus, South Jakarta, at 5:20 p.m. on 13 August 2016, at the age of 73. His death was confirmed by the Ministry of Cooperative and Micro, Small and Medium Enterprises.
