= Belimbing, West Sumatra =

Coordinates: 0.522°S 100.577°E

Belimbing (sometimes called Balimbiang) is a small village in the Minangkabau Highlands of West Sumatra, Indonesia. It is famous for its outstanding collection of vernacular architecture, including what is thought to be the oldest surviving example of a rumah gadang tuo, the traditional house of the Minangkabau people. The town is located on a back road between the market town of Batu Sangkar and Lake Singkarak.

== Architecture ==
Belimbing boasts one of the biggest surviving clusters of traditional Minangkabau houses, many of which are claimed to be between two and three hundred years old. These houses feature the traditional buffalo-horn roof that is characteristic of Minangkabau architecture. Some of the houses are still occupied whilst others have been abandoned and have fallen into a state of decay. The village also features a traditional 'balai adat', where men would traditionally meet to decide on village business. However, the village is best known for its venerable 'rumah gadang tuo', believed to be the oldest surviving example of a Minangkabau house. It is said to be 350 years old and was built traditionally, without the use of any nails at all. Unlike many old houses, which have been re-roofed with zinc sheeting, this building still uses thatch. The structure is now preserved as a museum.

== See also ==
- Architecture of Indonesia
