= Minangkabau Highlands =

Mountainous area of West Sumatra, Indonesia

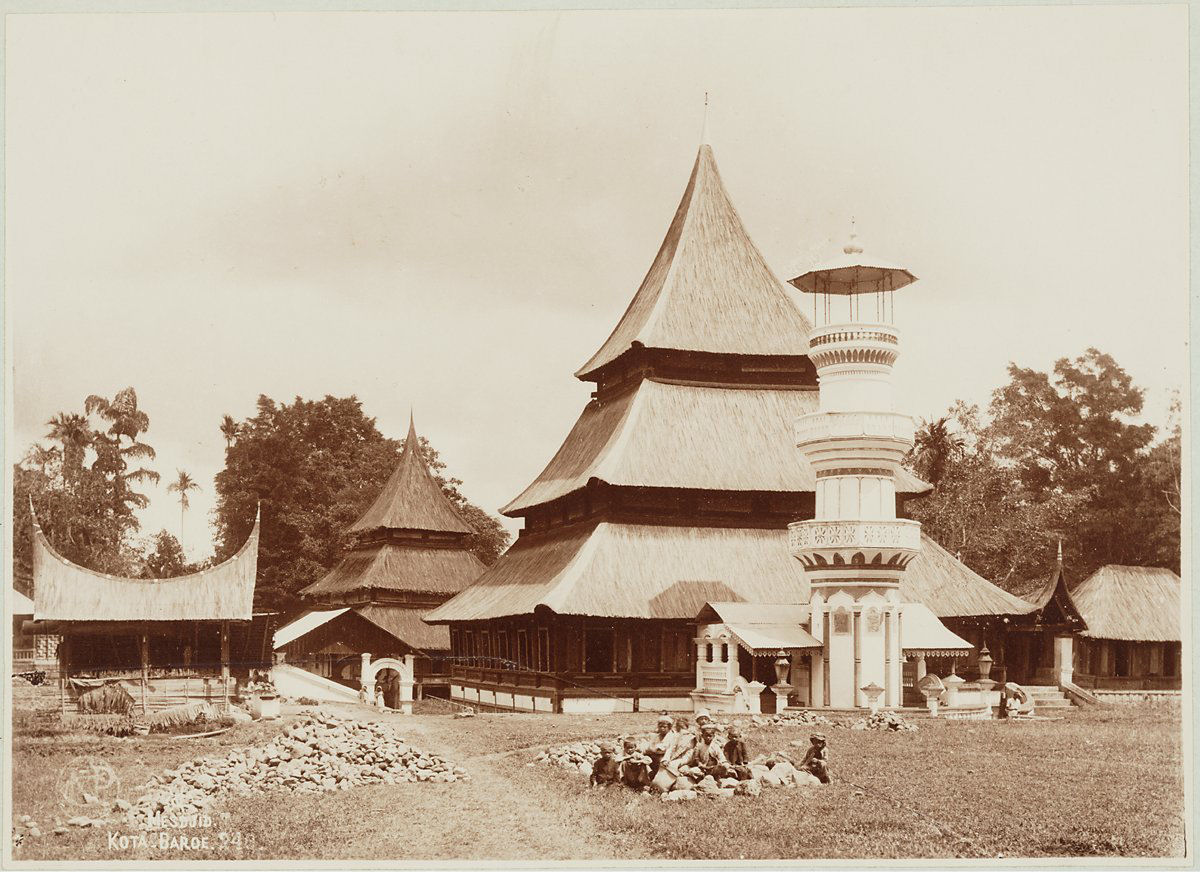
Minangkabau mosque circa 1892–1905 photographed by Christiaan Benjamin Nieuwenhuis

The Minangkabau Highlands (Indonesian: Dataran Tinggi Minangkabau, pronounced [daˌt̪aran̪ ˌt̪iŋɡi minaŋˈkabau̯]; Minangkabau: Minang Darek) is a mountainous area in the province of West Sumatra, located around three mountains—Mount Marapi, Mount Singgalang, and Mount Sago—in west-central Sumatra, Indonesia. The highlands are part of the Barisan Mountains, the largest mountain range in Sumatra. They are home to the Minangkabau people who refer to the area as Alam Minangkabau, or "the world of Minangkabau". This area formed a kingdom known from at least the 7th century as Malayu.

Wet rice cultivation probably evolved in the highlands long before it appeared in other parts of Sumatra, and predates significant foreign contact. Inscriptions in the area have been found from the rule of Adityavarman (1347–1375). The Dutch began exploiting the gold reserves in the highlands in the 1680s. They dominated the trade in the area, severely restricting the trade outlets between the highlands and the ports on the coast between 1820 and 1899, bringing about a marked decrease in rice production. The highlands consist of three major valleys: Tanah Datar Valley, Agam Valley, and Limapuluh Valley.

The village of Belimbing in the highlands is well known for its examples of surviving Minangkabu architecture.

== See also ==
- West Sumatra
- Minangkabau people
- Pagaruyung Kingdom
