= Mount Singgalang =

Mountain in West Sumatra, Indonesia

Singgalang
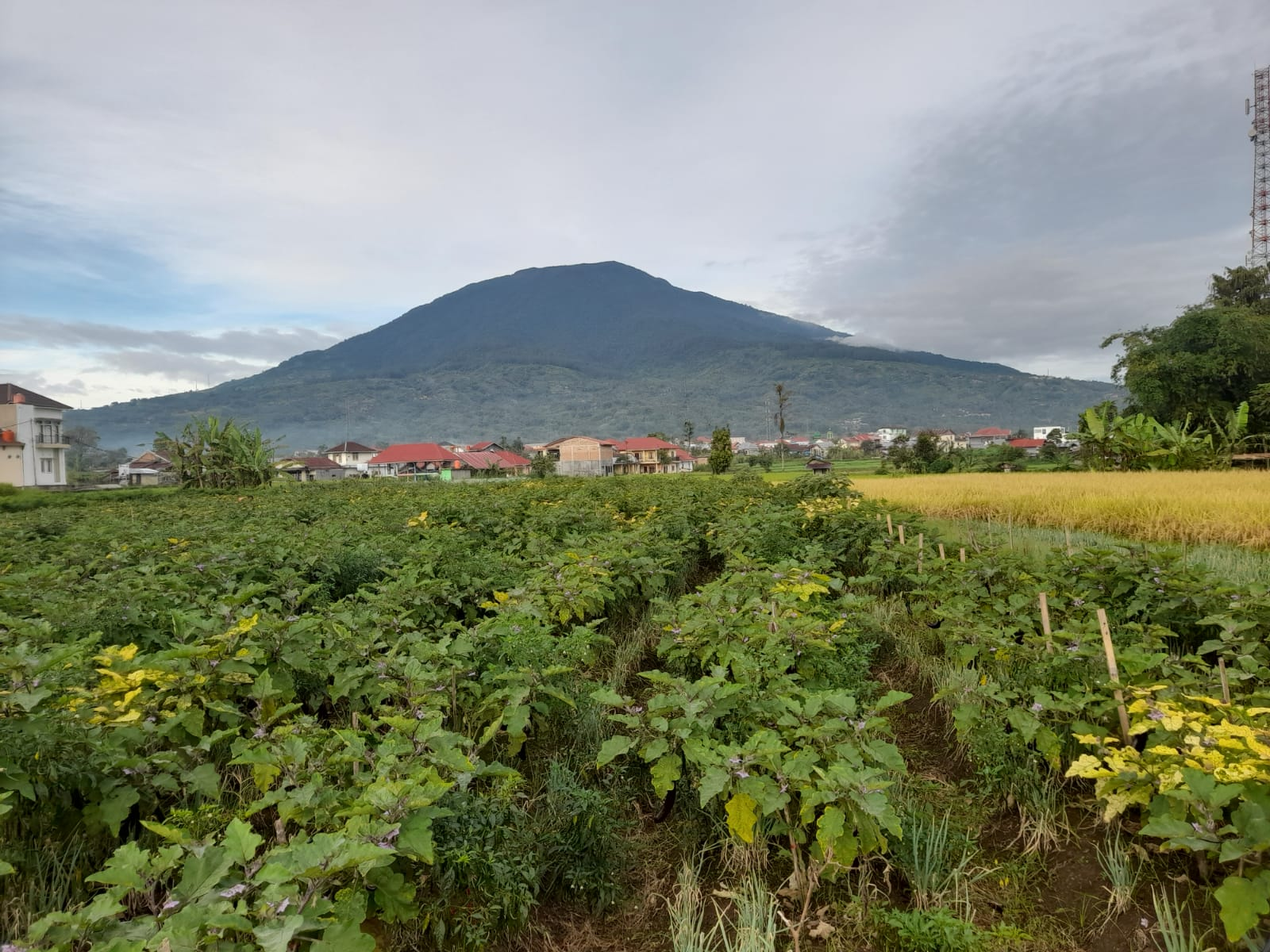
- Singgalang in 2017 view from Bukittinggi city

Highest point
- Elevation: 2,877 m (9,439 ft)
- Listing: Ultra; Ribu
- Coordinates: 0°23′24″S 100°19′51″E

Geography
- Location: West Sumatra, Indonesia
- Parent range: Barisan Mountains

Geology
- Mountain type: Stratovolcano
- Volcanic arc: Sunda Arc
- Last eruption: Unknown

Mount Singgalang (Gunung Singgalang in Indonesian) is a volcano in West Sumatra, Indonesia, about 10 km to the southwest of the town of Bukittinggi. Its elevation is 2,877 m (9,439 ft). It is a twin volcano with Mount Tandikat, which is located to the south-south-west of Singgalang. However, only Tandikat has had historical volcanic activity. Bukittinggi and the smaller town of Padang Panjang are located towards the east of the mountain.

There are two lakes at the summit named Dewi (Goddess) and Kumbang (Beetle).

== See also ==
- List of ultras of the Malay Archipelago
