= Volcanological Survey of Indonesia =

Government agency of Indonesia

Center of Volcanology and Geological Disaster Mitigation of Indonesia
- Pusat Vulkanologi dan Mitigasi Bencana Geologi

Agency overview
- Formed: 1919 (earliest formation)
- Headquarters: Jalan Diponegoro 57, Bandung, West Java, Indonesia
- Parent department: Ministry of Energy and Mineral Resources
- Website: vsi.esdm.go.id

Volcanological Survey of Indonesia is the official Indonesian government agency under Ministry of Energy and Mineral Resources which are responsible for investigating, recording, and warning about volcanoes within the Indonesian region of responsibility and geological hazard mitigation.

The full official Indonesian name is the Pusat Vulkanologi dan Mitigasi Bencana Geologi (English: Centre for Volcanology and Geological Hazard Mitigation), often abbreviated to PVMBG. It is based in Bandung in West Java.

It was preceded by the Netherlands East Indies Volcanological Survey.

It has also been known as the Direktorat Vulkanologi, the organisation published a range of publications during the era with that the name:

- Peta geologi gunung api (Geologic map of volcano)
- Peta daerah bahaya gunung api (Volcanic hazard map)
- Peta kawasan rawan bencana gunung api (Volcanic hazard map of volcano)

Its main annual publication has been known as Berita Berkala Vulkanologi.

Direktorat Vulkanologi also has published historical records of references to eruptions in historical time:-

- Data dasar gunung api Indonesia (Catalogue of references on Indonesian volcanoes with eruptions in historical time)
