= Mount Marapi =

Active volcano in West Sumatra, Indonesia

Marapi
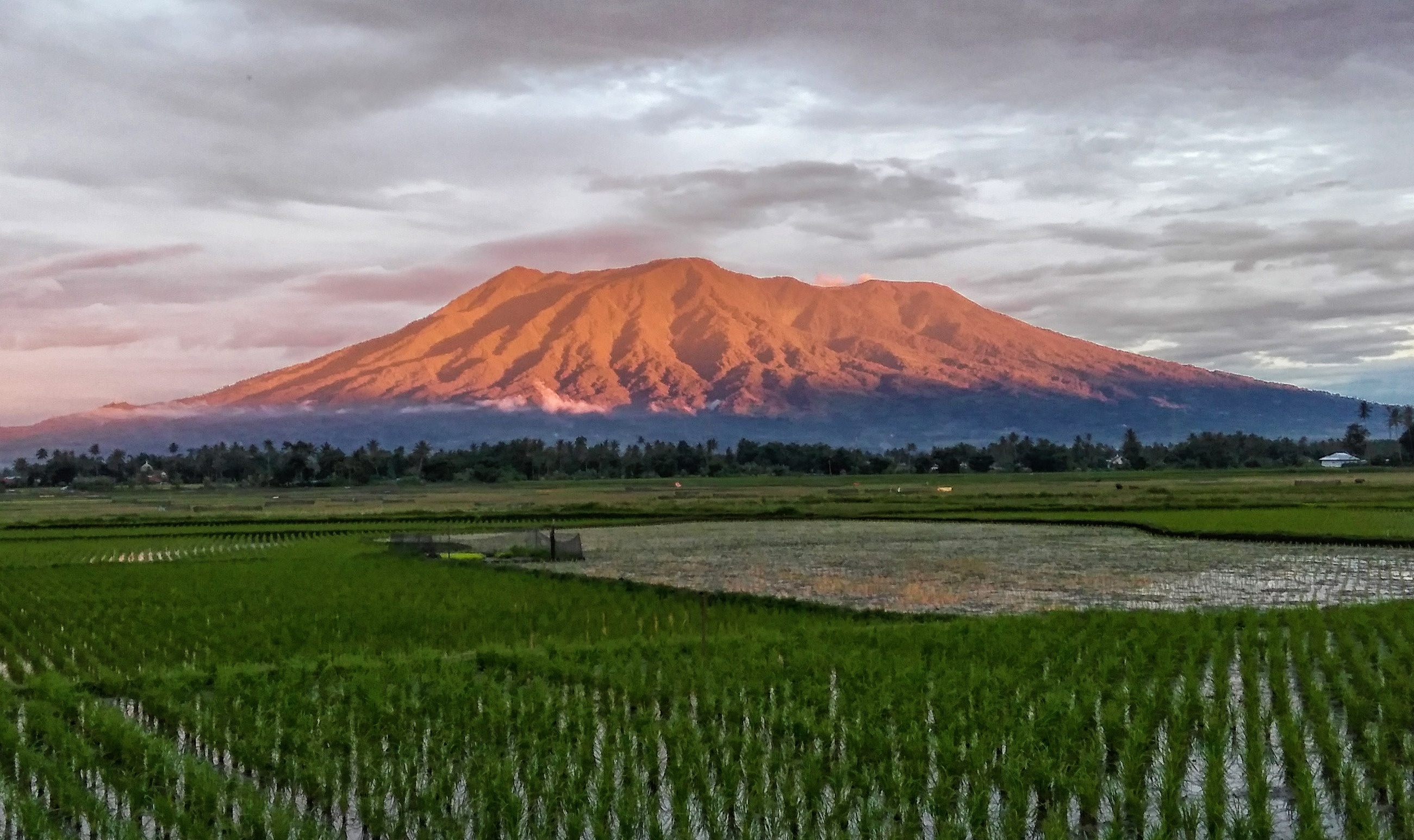
- Marapi in 2017

Highest point
- Elevation: 2,891 m (9,485 ft)
- Prominence: 2,116 m (6,942 ft)
- Listing: Ultra; Ribu
- Coordinates: 00°22′48″S 100°28′27″E

Geography
- Location within Indonesia
- Location: West Sumatra, Indonesia
- Parent range: Barisan Mountains

Geology
- Mountain type: Complex volcano
- Volcanic arc: Sunda Arc
- Last eruption: 04 January 2025

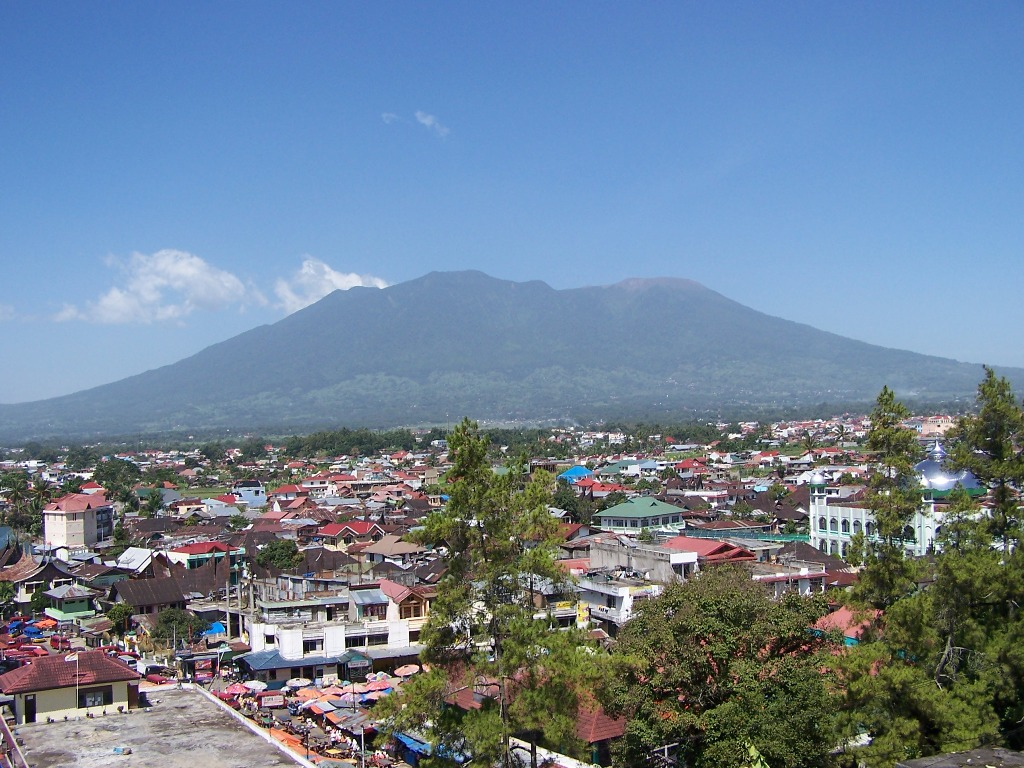
Mount Marapi and Bukittinggi

The Marapi (Jawi: ماراڤي), or Mount Marapi (Indonesian: Gunung Marapi, Minangkabau: Gunuang Marapi, Jawi: ڬونوواڠ ماراڤي), is a complex volcano in West Sumatra, Indonesia, and is the most active volcano in Sumatra. Like that of its quasi-homonym on Java, its name means "Mountain of Fire". Its elevation is 2,885 metres (9,465.2 ft). Several cities and towns are situated around the mountain including Bukittinggi, Padang Panjang, and Batusangkar. The volcano is also popular among hikers.

== Mythology ==
According to legend, the mountain is the site first settled by the Minangkabau people after their ship landed on the mountain when it was the size of an egg and surrounded by water. There are large numbers of upright burial stones in the region which are oriented in the direction of the mountain, indicating its cultural significance.

== Eruptions ==
The volcano has a known history of eruptions. Marapi underwent a significant eruption in September 1830. In January 1975 an eruption occurred with mudflows and lahars that caused fatalities in the surrounding area. A significant eruption occurred in 1979, which killed 60 people. At least one person was killed during an eruption in 1996. In April–May 2018 ashfalls to the southeast occurred.

Since 2011, the volcano has been at the second level of a four-tier alert system set up by the Volcanological Survey of Indonesia. Predicting the volcano's behavior is described as difficult as the source of its sudden eruptions are shallow and near its peak, while its eruptions are not caused by a deep movement of magma that can be detected as volcanic earthquakes on seismic monitors. Nevertheless, there are about 1,400 people living on its slopes in the villages of Rubai and Gobah Cumantiang, about 5 to 6 kilometers from the summit.

=== 2023 eruption ===
On 3 December 2023, the volcano erupted, leaving 23 climbers dead. Three people were injured and rescued. The ash reached to a height of 3,000 metres (9,800 ft) and fell in nearby regions. A three-kilometre (1.9-mile) exclusion zone was announced. The Center for Volcanology and Geological Hazard Mitigation stated that the eruption occurred suddenly. At the time, there had been no recorded increase in seismic activity since the beginning of 2023.

On 22 December, the volcano erupted again, emitting volcanic ash that forced the cancellation of flights at Minangkabau International Airport.

As of January 2024, at least 113 eruptions have occurred on Marapi since its initial activity in December, with the latest eruption occurring on 23 January. Ash has risen at least 1300 meters into the air and residents within a radius of 4.5 kilometers have been urged to evacuate their homes.

At 12:13 a.m. local time on 27 March, Marapi erupted again, emitting a volcanic ash column with a height of 1.5 kilometers. Flights at Minangkabau International Airport were cancelled again due to the eruption.

=== 2025 eruption ===
At 9:43 a.m. local time on 04 January, Marapi erupted, emitting a volcanic ash column with a height of 1 kilometers.

Throughout July 2025, Mount Marapi has experienced seven eruptions and eleven ash emissions. Eruptions occurred on July 6 (once), July 11 (twice), July 14 (twice), July 15 (once), and July 16 (once). Of the seven eruptions, only the one on Wednesday, July 16, 2025, at 10:42 AM local time had its eruption height observed, reaching an ash column approximately 1.2 kilometers above the summit. The other eruptions were not visible due to being obscured by fog.

== Lahar flows ==
On 11 May 2024, heavy rain triggered mudslides and lahar flows from the volcano, killing at least 67 people and leaving 20 others missing.

== See also ==
- List of ultras of the Malay Archipelago
- List of volcanoes in Indonesia
