= List of ministers of Agrarian Affairs and Spatial Planning =

Minister of Agrarian Affairs and Spatial Planning
- Emblem of the ministry

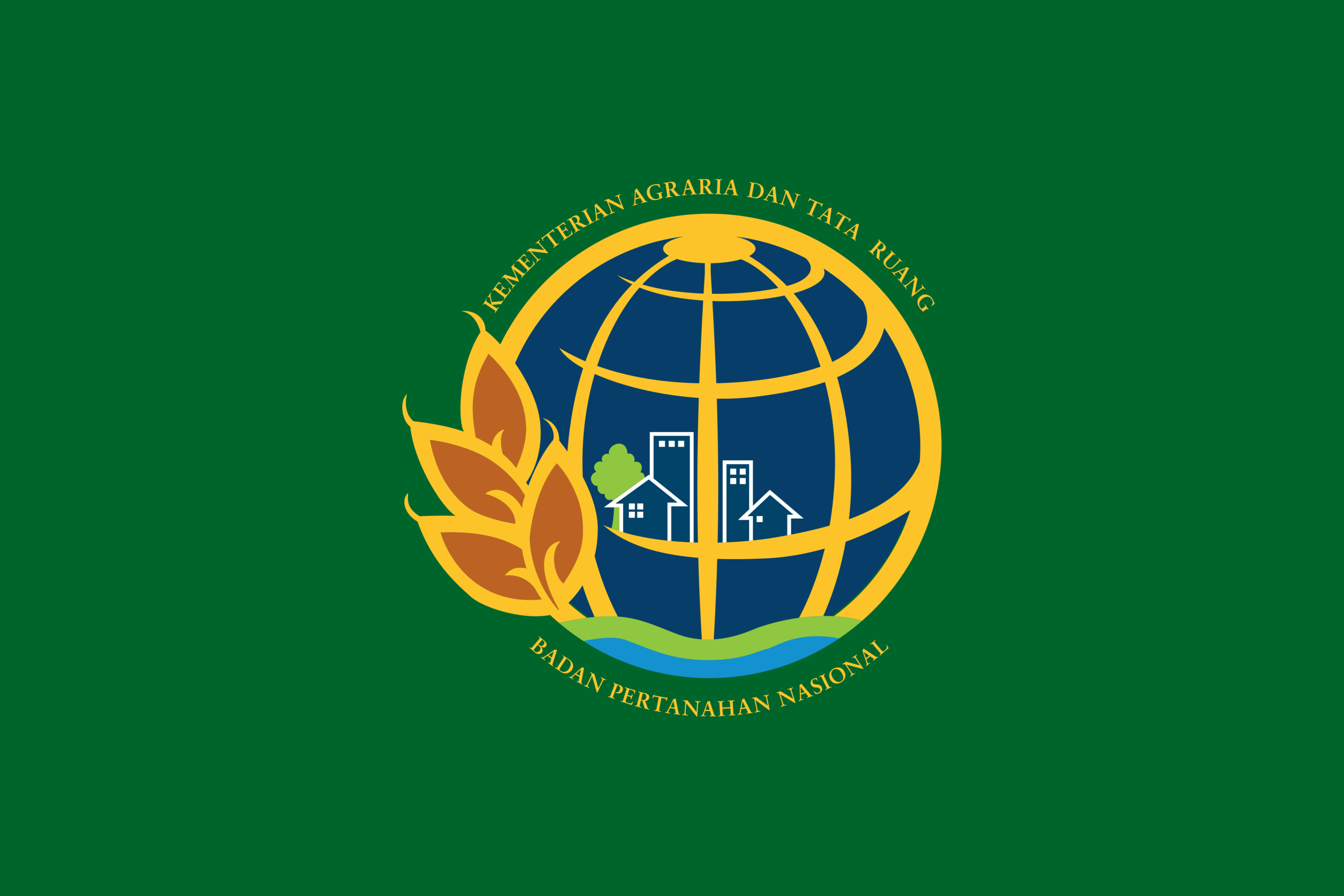
- Flag of the ministry

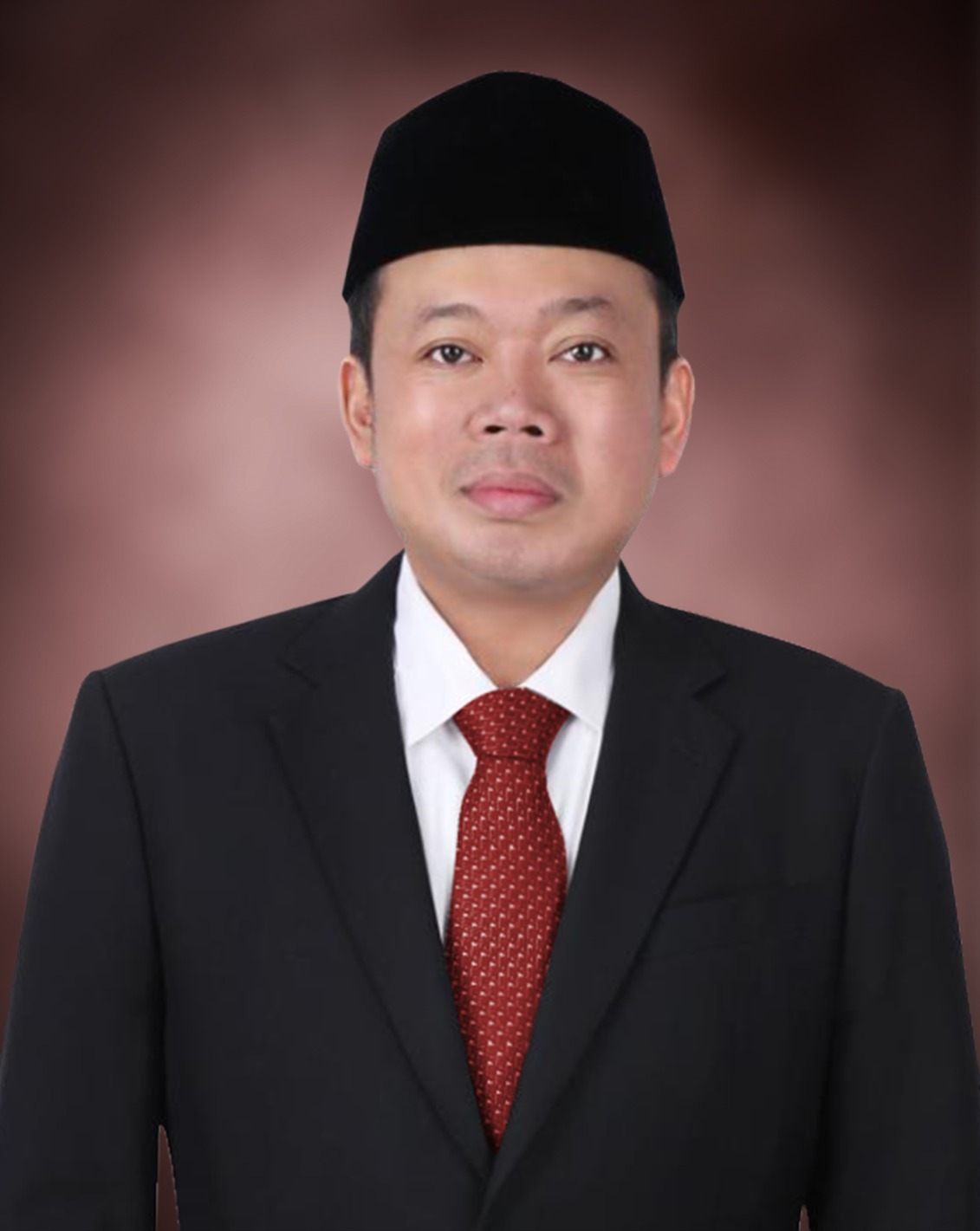
- Incumbent; Nusron Wahid since 21 October 2024
- Appointer: President of Indonesia
- Inaugural holder: Gondokusumo
- Formation: 20 November 1951
- Website: www.atrbpn.go.id

This article lists those who have held the office of the Minister of Agrarian Affairs and Spatial Planning in Indonesia as well as its forerunners.

No	Name	Cabinet	Took office	Left office	R
Head of the Agrarian Bureau of the Ministry of Home Affairs (1946–1951)
A	Sarimin Reksodihardjo	Sjahrir II	12 March 1946	20 November 1951	
A	Sarimin Reksodihardjo	Sjahrir III	12 March 1946	20 November 1951	
A	Sarimin Reksodihardjo	Amir Sjarifuddin I	12 March 1946	20 November 1951	
A	Sarimin Reksodihardjo	Amir Sjarifuddin II	12 March 1946	20 November 1951	
A	Sarimin Reksodihardjo	Hatta I	12 March 1946	20 November 1951	
A	Sarimin Reksodihardjo	Hatta II	12 March 1946	20 November 1951	
A	Sarimin Reksodihardjo	Federal	12 March 1946	20 November 1951	
A	Sarimin Reksodihardjo	Natsir	12 March 1946	20 November 1951	
State Minister of Agrarian Affairs (1951–1952)
1	Gondokusumo	Sukiman-Suwirjo	20 November 1951	6 March 1952	
Head of the Agrarian Bureau of the Ministry of Home Affairs (1952–1953)
B	Sarimin Reksodihardjo	Wilopo	April 1952	1 June 1952	
C	Mohammad Nasroen	Wilopo	1 June 1952	1 August 1953	
Minister of Agrarian Affairs (1953–1959)
2	Mohammad Hanafiah	Ali Sastroamidjojo I	1 August 1953	19 November 1954	
3	I Gusti Gde Raka	Ali Sastroamidjojo I	19 November 1954	12 August 1955	
4	Gunawan	Burhanuddin Harahap	12 August 1955	3 March 1956	
5	Agustinus Suhardi	Ali Sastroamidjojo II	24 March 1956	14 April 1957	
6	R. Sunarjo	Djuanda	9 April 1957	5 July 1959	
Junior Minister of Agrarian Affairs (1959–1960)
	Sadjarwo Djarwonagoro	Working I	10 July 1959	18 February 1960	
Minister of Agrarian Affairs (1960–1962)
7	Sadjarwo Djarwonagoro	Working II	18 February 1960	6 March 1962	
Minister of Agriculture and Agrarian Affairs (1962–1963)
(7)	Sadjarwo Djarwonagoro	Working III	6 March 1962	13 November 1963	
Minister of Agrarian Affairs (1963–1966)
8	Rudolf Hermanses	Working IV	13 November 1963	25 July 1966	
8	Rudolf Hermanses	Dwikora I	13 November 1963	25 July 1966	
8	Rudolf Hermanses	Dwikora II	13 November 1963	25 July 1966	
8	Rudolf Hermanses	Dwikora III	13 November 1963	25 July 1966	
Directorate General of Agrarian Affairs (1967–1988)
D	Sujono Suparto	Ampera I	4 August 1966	14 August 1968	
D	Sujono Suparto	Ampera II	4 August 1966	14 August 1968	
D	Sujono Suparto	Development I	4 August 1966	14 August 1968	
—	Basuki Rahmat	Development I	14 August 1968	8 January 1969	
—	Amir Machmud	Development I	8 January 1969	29 March 1969	
E	Abdulrachman Setjowibowo	Development II	29 March 1969	5 August 1978	
E	Abdulrachman Setjowibowo	Development III	29 March 1969	5 August 1978	
F	Daryono	Development III	5 August 1978	24 September 1982	
G	Muhammad Isa	Development IV	24 September 1982	7 February 1986	
—	Suparni Pamudji	Development IV	7 February 1986	24 December 1986	
H	Sarwata	Development IV	24 December 1986	21 November 1988	
Head of the National Land Agency (1988–1993)
I	Soni Harsono	Development V	21 November 1988	17 March 1993	
State Minister of Agrarian Affairs/Head of the National Land Agency (1993–1999)
9 (I)	Soni Harsono	Development VI	17 March 1993	14 March 1998	
10 (II)	Ary Mardjono	Development VII	14 March 1998	21 May 1998	
11 (III)	Hasan Basri Durin	Development Reform	23 May 1998	20 October 1999	
Minister of Home Affairs/Head of the National Land Agency (1999–2001)
IV	Soerjadi Soedirdja	National Unity	29 October 1999	23 July 2001	
V	Hari Sabarno	Mutual Assistance	10 August 2001	3 December 2001	
Head of the National Land Agency (2001–2014)
VI	Lutfi Ibrahim Nasution	Mutual Assistance	3 December 2001	20 October 2004	
VI	Lutfi Ibrahim Nasution	United Indonesia I	21 October 2004	22 July 2005	
VII	Joyo Winoto	United Indonesia I	22 July 2005	20 October 2009	
VII	Joyo Winoto	United Indonesia II	22 October 2009	14 June 2012	
VIII	Hendarman Supandji	United Indonesia II	14 June 2012	20 October 2014	
Minister of Agrarian Affairs and Spatial Planning/Head of the National Land Agency (2014–present)
12 (IX)	Ferry Mursyidan Baldan	Working	27 October 2014	27 July 2016	
13 (X)	Sofyan Djalil	Working	27 July 2016	20 October 2019	
13 (X)	Sofyan Djalil	Onward Indonesia	23 October 2019	15 June 2022	
14 (XI)	Hadi Tjahjanto	Onward Indonesia	15 June 2022	21 February 2024	
15 (XII)	Agus Harimurti Yudhoyono	Onward Indonesia	21 February 2024	20 October 2024	
16 (XIII)	Nusron Wahid	Red and White	21 October 2024	Incumbent	

== Note ==
- A–H: Head of the Agrarian Bureau/ Directorate General of Agrarian Affairs under Ministry of Home Affairs
- I–XIII: Head of the National Land Agency
- 1–16: Minister of Agrarian Affairs and Spatial Planning
