= Sixth Development Cabinet =

Cabinet of Indonesia 1993–1998

Sixth Development Cabinet Kabinet Pembangunan VI
- 33rd Cabinet of Indonesia
- 1993–1998
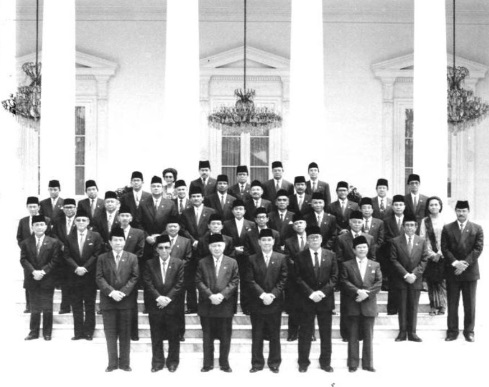
- President Suharto (front row, third from the left) with the newly-elected cabinet in front of the Istana Merdeka, 19 March 1993
- Date formed: 19 March 1993
- Date dissolved: 11 March 1998

People and organisations
- President: Suharto
- Vice President: Try Sutrisno
- No. of ministers: 38
- Member parties: Functional Groups; Armed Forces
- Status in legislature: Supermajority government 382 / 500
- Opposition parties: United Development Party; Indonesian Democratic Party

History
- Election: 1993 Indonesian presidential election
- Predecessor: Development V Cabinet
- Successor: Development VII Cabinet

The Sixth Development Cabinet (Indonesian: Kabinet Pembangunan VI) was the Indonesian cabinet which served under President Suharto and Vice President Try Sutrisno from March 1993 until March 1998. The Cabinet was formed after Suharto was elected to a sixth term as president by the People's Consultative Assembly (MPR).

== The five cabinet aims ==
Whilst announcing the cabinet, Suharto also announced its aims.

- Continuing, intensifying, deepening, and expanding national development as an application of Pancasila with the Development Trilogy as its foundation and having national knowledge to strengthen national resilience and determination for self-reliance.
- Intensifying national discipline with a state apparatus as its pioneers and aiming towards a clean and legitimate government in giving service to the People of Indonesia.
- Institutionalizing a national leadership mechanism based on the 1945 Constitution, Pancasila, Pancasila democracy, and the Pancasila Indoctrination and Application Guidelines (P4) in daily life as a state, nation, and community.
- Executing a free and active foreign policy, based on the principle of peaceful coexistence in bilateral, regional, and global relationships for the sake of national development.
- Holding direct, universal, free, and secret legislative elections in 1997.

== President and vice president ==
President	Vice President
Suharto	Try Sutrisno

== Coordinating ministers ==
- Coordinating Minister of Economics and Development Supervision: Saleh Afiff
- Coordinating Minister of People's Welfare: Lt. Gen. (hon.) Azwar Anas
- Coordinating Minister of Politics and Security: Gen. (hon.) Susilo Sudarman
- Coordinating Minister of Production and Distribution: Hartarto

== Departmental ministers ==
- Minister of Home Affairs: Lt. Gen. (ret.) Yogie Suardi Memet
- Minister of Foreign Affairs: Ali Alatas
- Minister of Defense and Security/Commander of the Armed Forces: Gen. Edi Sudrajat
- Minister of Justice: Utoyo Usman
- Minister of Information: Harmoko
- Minister of Finance: Mar'ie Muhammad
- Minister of Trade: Satrio Budihardjo Joedono
- Minister of Industry: Tungky Ariwibowo
- Minister of Agriculture: Syarifuddin Baharsjah
- Minister of Mines and Energy: Lt. Gen. (ret.) Ida Bagus Sudjana
- Minister of Forestry: Jamaluddin Suryohadikusumo
- Minister of Public Works: Radinal Mochtar
- Minister of Transportation: Haryanto Danutirto
- Minister of Tourism, Post, and Telecommunications: Joop Ave
- Minister of Manpower: Abdul Latief
- Minister of Cooperatives and Small Business: Subiakto Tjakrawerdaya
- Minister of Transmigration and Forest Settlement: Siswono Yudohusodo
- Minister of Education and Culture: Wardiman Joyonegoro
- Minister of Health: Sujudi
- Minister of Religious Affairs: Tarmizi Taher
- Minister of Social Affairs: Kusuma Inten Soeweno

== State ministers ==
- State Minister/State Secretary: Maj. Gen. (ret.) Murdiono
- State Minister/Cabinet Secretary: Saadilah Mursyid
- State Minister of National Development Planning/Chairman of the National Development Planning Body (BAPPENAS): Ginandjar Kartasasmita
- State Minister of Research and Technology/Chairman of the Research and Implementation of Technology Board (BPPT): B. J. Habibie
- State Minister of Foodstuffs/Chairman of the Logistical Affairs Board (BULOG): Ibrahim Hasan
- State Minister of Population/Chairman of Planned Families National Coordinating Body (BKKBN): Haryono Suyono
- State Minister of the Promotion of Investment/Chairman of the Investment Coordinating Body: Sanyoto Sastrowardoyo
- State Minister of Agrarian Affairs/Chairman of the National Land Body: Soni Harsono
- State Minister of Housing: Akbar Tanjung
- State Minister of Environment: Sarwono Kusumaatmaja
- State Minister of Female Empowerment: Mien Sugandhi
- State Minister of Youth Affairs and Sports: Hayono Isman
- State Minister of Administrative Reform: Maj. Gen. (ret.) T. B. Silahahi

== Officials with ministerial rank ==
- Governor of the Central Bank: J. Soedradjad Djiwandono
- Attorney General: Singgih

== Changes ==
- 18 May 1993: Edi Sudrajat was replaced by General Feisal Tanjung as Commander of ABRI.
- 6 December 1995: The Department of Industry and Department of Trade were merged into the Department of Industry and Trade. Tungky Ariwibowo became Minister of Industry and Trade, while Satrio Budihardjo Joedono, who had become known as "Mr Clean", the resumed his teaching duties at the University of Indonesia.
- 11 June 1997: Harmoko was replaced by Gen. (ret.) Hartono as Minister of Information. Harmoko was then appointed as State Minister of Special Affairs. This post was abolished when Harmoko was appointed chairman of the People's Consultative Assembly in October.
- 11 December 1997: Coordinating Minister of Politics and Security Susilo Sudarman died.
- February 1998: Soedradjad Djiwandono was replaced by Syahril Sabirin as Governor of the Central Bank
- February 1998: Feisal Tanjung was replaced by General Wiranto as Commander of ABRI.
