= Yaumil Agoes Achir =

Indonesian psychologist and University Faculty Dean (1941–2003)

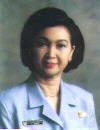

Chief of the National Family Planning Coordinating Board
- In office 14 November 2001 – 1 July 2003
- President: Megawati Soekarnoputri
- Preceded by: Khofifah Indar Parawansa
- Succeeded by: Sumarjati Arjoso

Dean of the Faculty of Psychology of the University of Indonesia
- In office 11 September 1990 – 25 June 1994
- Preceded by: Soesmalijah Soewondo
- Succeeded by: Suprapti Sumarmo Markam

Personal details
- Born: May 20, 1941 Pangkalan Brandan, North Sumatra, Indonesia
- Died: July 1, 2003 (aged 62) Johns Hopkins Hospital, Singapore
- Spouse: Agoes Achir
- Children: 2
- Education: University of Indonesia (Drs., Dr., Prof.); Vrije Universiteit Amsterdam

Academic background
- Thesis: Talent and achievement: a comparative study of non-intellectual factors between gifted and underachieving gifted children through an approach to students and parents in two senior high schools (1990)
- Doctoral advisor: Sukarni Catur Utami Munandar

Academic work
- Discipline: Psychology
- Sub-discipline: Child psychology

Yaumil Chairiah Agoes Achir (born Yaumil Chairiah, 20 May 1941 – 1 July 2003) was an Indonesian psychologist who served as the Dean of University of Indonesia's Faculty of Psychology from 1990 to 1994 and as the Chief of the National Family Planning Coordinating Board from 2001 until her death in 2003.

== Early life and education ==
Yaumil was born on 20 May 1941 in Pangkalan Brandan (Note: Her doctoral thesis and inaugural professorial speech stated that she was born in Pangkalan Brandan. Other sources wrote Weh Island as her birth place.) as the fifth of nine children of Ilyas Sutan Maradjo, the chief of postal services in the Weh Island. All of her brothers and sisters have the same first name, Yaumil, with their second name being their given name. Yaumil's parents sent all of his children, who have completed primary education, to reside in their relative's house and continue their education in Jakarta. Yaumil was not an exception, and she was sent to study at the 10th State Junior High School in Jakarta in 1953 after completing elementary school in Weh Island. Yaumil described the separation from her parents as a "traumatic experience", but later stated that the experience helped her in developing her social skills.

Yaumil completed her high school at the 1st (Boedoet) Jakarta State High School in 1959. Based on recommendation from Soedjono Djoened Poesponegoro (later Minister of National Research), she decided to major in psychology at the University of Indonesia (UI). She received her bachelor's degree from the university in 1967. Throughout her career as a lecturer, she pursued further studies in psychology by attending a short course on child psychology methodology in Nijmegen in 1975 and several postgraduate courses in psychology held by UI. In 1979, she received her specialty degree from the Vrije Universiteit Amsterdam, as part of a cooperation program between the university and UI. She was officially recognized as a child psychology specialist in an inaugural ceremony held by UI's psychology faculty on 16 February 1981.

On 29 December 1990, Yaumil successfully defended her doctoral thesis in psychology. Her thesis, which researched talent and achievement among high school students, involves 2,809 students from two different high school in Jakarta.

In 1995, Yaumil attended a course at the National Resilience Institute while serving as assistant to the State Minister of Population Affairs, alongside other high-ranking military and civilian officials. She came out as the best graduate of her cohort.

== Academic career ==
Yaumil began her academic career in 1964 as an assistant to Professor Sukarni Catur Munandar, who would later become her doctoral advisor. Yaumil was called by her colleagues and students as "Mbak Ade". Due to her expertise and her articulacy, she was frequently invited as a speaker to seminar and academic conference.

By October 1982, Yaumil was appointed as the chair of educational psychology in UI's psychology faculty. On 11 September 1990, Yaumil became the dean of the faculty, replacing Soesmalijah Soewondo. During her tenure as dean, Yaumil was appointed as a full professor in psychology on 1 April 1993. Her inaugural speech, which was read on 7 August 1993, was titled Psychological Approach in National Education. She served as dean until 25 June 1994, when she was replaced by Suprapti Sumarmo.

== Government career ==
Yaumil began to be involved in government agencies since her appointment as the chair of education psychology . From 1980 to 1989, she was an expert consultant to the National Law Development Agency. She was also a member of a working group for children's welfare in the Coordinating Minister for People's Welfare office and for adolescent family development in the State Minister for Women Affairs office.

By the Jakarta provincial government, Yaumil was included as a member of the School Resilience Development Agency in 1986. The agency was established to resolve juvenile delinquency problems in the province. Yaumil proposed a program to develop a more joyful teaching process in school. The program, which was pilot tested on several schools, received positive feedback from students.

Several months before ending her tenure as dean, in September 1993 she was appointed as Assistant III to the State Minister of Population Affairs, which at that time was held by Haryono Suyono. She was responsible for assisting the minister in matters relating to population quality development. After Haryono was appointed as the Coordinating Minister for People's Welfare and Poverty Eradication, Yaumil became his deputy for human resources.

On 3 August 2000, Yaumil became the deputy secretary of Vice President Megawati Sukarnoputri for people's welfare. She chaired the National Social Security System Working Group, which formulated the basis for the current Indonesia's social security program. A year later, Megawati became the president of Indonesia, and she appointed Yaumil as the Chief of the National Family Planning Coordinating Board on 14 November 2001.

Prior to her appointment, the body was double-hatted with the post of Minister of Woman's Empowerment, making it a cabinet-level post. President Megawati officially separated the two position and demoted it from a cabinet level post to a non-departmental government agency (LPNK, Lembaga Pemerintah Non-Kementerian). The move was part of the government's bigger agenda on regional autonomy and was intended to decentralize planned family and handing over its implementation to regional government in Indonesia. Yaumil emphasized that the decentralization agenda must not affect the population negatively and pushed for it to be completely handed no later than December 2003. The handover would meant that the central government has no authority to interfere in the implementation of planned family in the regional level. At the time of her death in July 2003, around 26% of regions in Indonesia had already implemented local laws for the decentralization.

Yaumil also initiated a program to distribute contraceptives for low-income couples in January 2003. The distribution of the contraceptives will be managed by provincial governments based on local requests. The program was hindered by the insufficient funds provided to cover all low-income couples.

== Personal life ==
Yaumil died at the Johns Hopkins-National University Hospital (NUH) International Medical Center in Singapore on 1 July 2003 due to Non-Hodgkin lymphoma cancer. Yaumil was diagnosed with the cancer around February 2003 and had to underwent chemotherapy in Singapore and treated at her home. Although she never went to her office since then, Yaumil continued working on family planning issues, such as decentralization. Her final birthday celebration on 20 May 2003 was attended by Sarlito Wirawan Sarwono, the-then dean of UI's psychology faculty, and Imam Haryadi, her deputy for family empowerment. Yaumil was also infected with pneumonia in her final days.

Yaumil's body was laid at a funeral home in the House of Representatives complex and the National Family Planning Coordinating Board office before being interred at the Karet Public Ceremony a day after.
