= Indonesian Military Academy =

Army education school in Central Java, Indonesia

Military Academy
- Akademi Militer
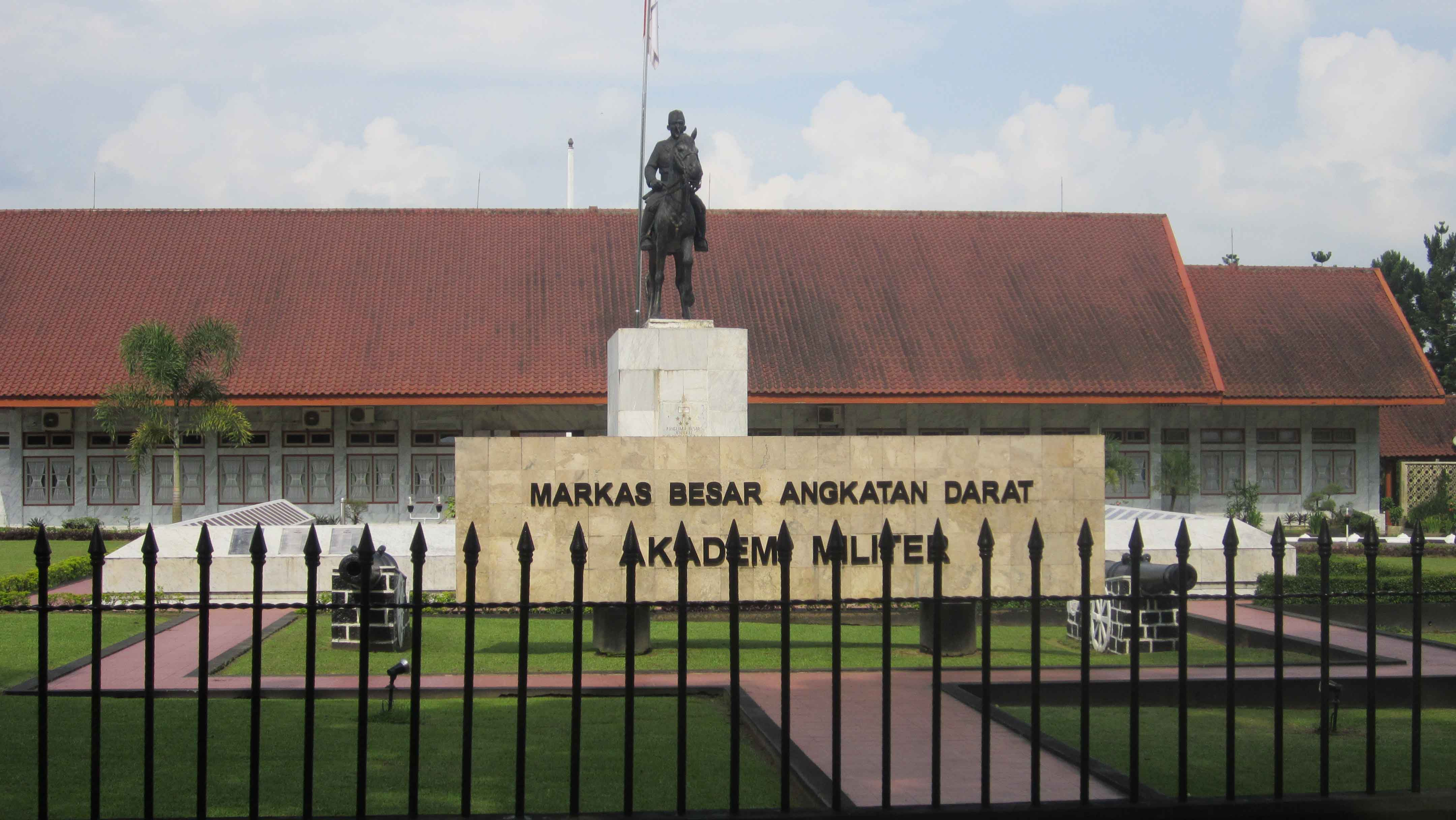
- Front view of the academy in Magelang
- Motto: Adhitakarya Mahatvavirya Nagarabhakti
- Motto in English: "Rush for knowledge and deeds, by noble goals and manners, to be the true patriots"
- Type: Service academy
- Established: 31 October 1945; 80 years ago
- Affiliations: Indonesian National Armed Forces Academies
- Superintendent: MGEN Sidharta Wisnu Graha, S.E. (Governor of the Academy)
- Commander of Cadets: BGEN Dwi Sasongko, S.E, M.H.
- Location: Magelang, Central Java, Indonesia; 7.502708°S 110.213055°E
- Colors: Blue and White
- Website: www.akmil.ac.id
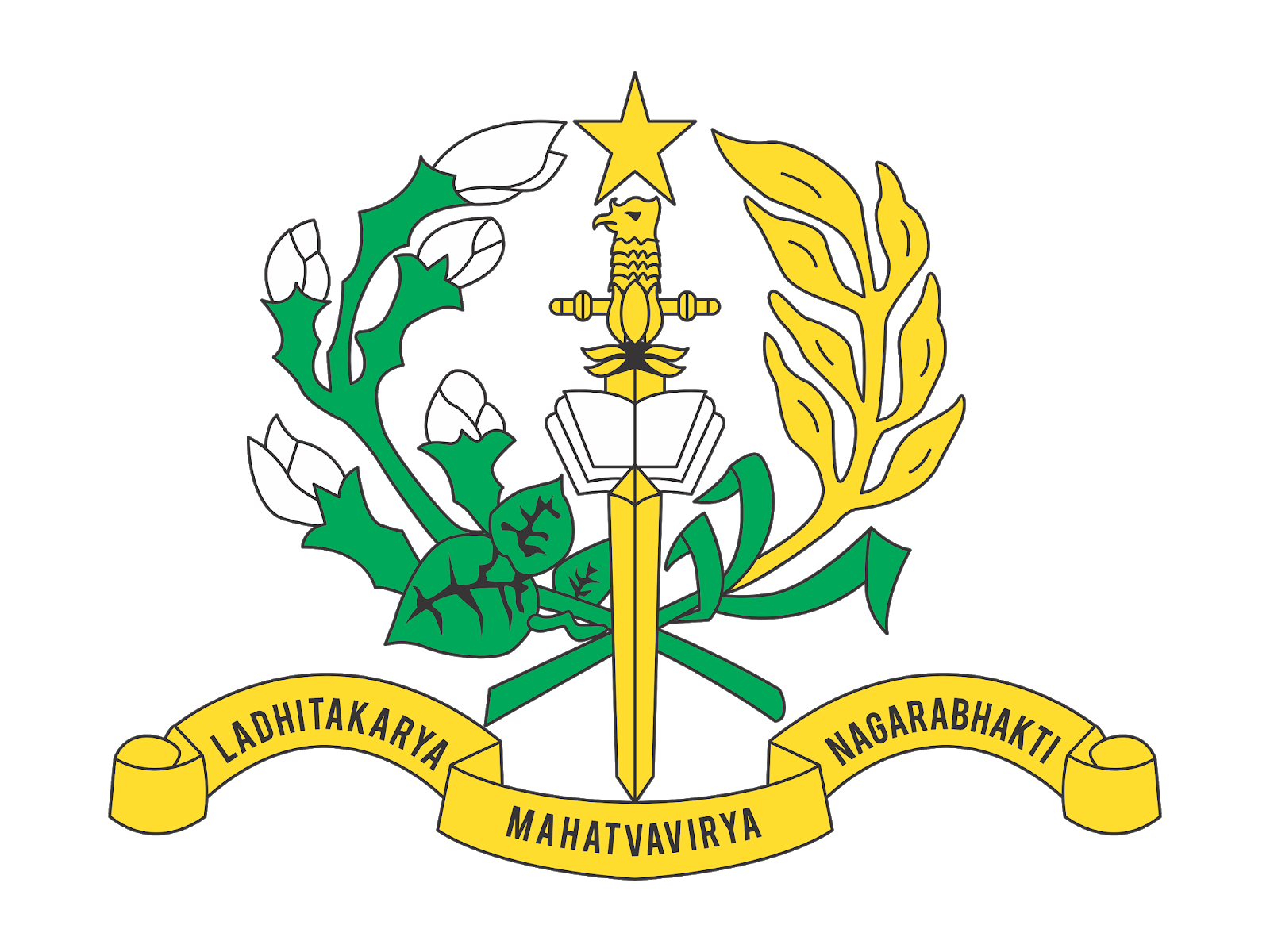

The Military Academy (Indonesian: Akademi Militer or Akmil) is a service academy of the Indonesian Army, part of the Indonesian National Armed Forces Academy (Akademi TNI). Founded on the early stages of the Indonesian Revolutionary War and located in the city of Magelang in Central Java, its alumni form a professional officer corps for the army, with all Indonesian Army Chiefs of Staff since 1988 having graduated from Akmil.

== History ==
In October 1945, several months after the Indonesian declaration of independence, then-Chief of Staff of the Indonesian Armed Forces Oerip Soemohardjo ordered the establishment of a military academy, which was called the Militaire Academie and was based in Yogyakarta. On the aftermath of a ceasefire with the Dutch armed forces in 1949, interest in the school dropped with only 9 cadets in Class 3 (1949 intake) compared to 200 in Class 2 (1946 intake), and the academy was closed in 1950 with remaining students sent to the Dutch Koninklijke Militaire Academie. In the following years, several army officer schools would pop out in Indonesia.

Partly in effort to transform a regional, guerilla force into a professional, national military, the then Chief of Staff of the Army Abdul Haris Nasution established the National Military Academy (Akademi Militer Nasional), which was officially opened on 11 November 1957 and included Mount Tidar in its premises within Magelang, giving the academy its nickname of Lembah Tidar (Tidar Valley), modeled on the United States Military Academy. The first cadets to graduate from this new institution in 1960 was recognized as Class 4 and numbered 59 graduating officers. Soon in 1961, the Indonesian Army Military Technical Academy (Akademi Tehnik Angkatan Darat / ATEKAD) based in Bandung was merged with the school and the cadets transferred to Magelang. Later, it was integrated with the Indonesian Naval Academy (Akademi Angkatan Laut), Air Force Academy (Akademi Angkatan Udara) and the Police Academy (Akademi Angkatan Kepolisian) to form the Armed Forces of the Republic of Indonesia Academy (AKABRI) in 1965.

In 1984, reorganization of the armed forces resulted in the academy renamed to its current form, the Military Academy Magelang (Akademi Militer). The Taruna Nusantara high school, established in 1990 by Akmil alumni Try Sutrisno and located just outside the military academy, was created in order to attract young talent to the academy.

On April 1, 1999, the National Police were officially separated from the other three forces after the reformation and the removal of dwifungsi. Since then, the Police Academy has been separated from the AKABRI, leaving Military Academy, Naval Academy, and Air Force Academy within the structure. AKABRI later changed to Akademi TNI or Akademi Tentara Nasional Indonesia.

=== Recent developments ===
Starting in 2011, graduates of the academy were awarded a bachelor's degree (in applied defence sciences, Indonesian: Sarjana Sains Terapan Pertahanan) along with other academies in Akademi TNI. In 2017, the academy had its first female graduates, among a graduating class of 225 cadets.

In October 2024, the academy hosted a retreat of the cabinet of newly-inaugurated President Prabowo Subianto.

The 2025 graduating class of the Academy served as the first of a renewed 3-year course of study following the practice of France and the National Defense Academy of India.

== Academics ==
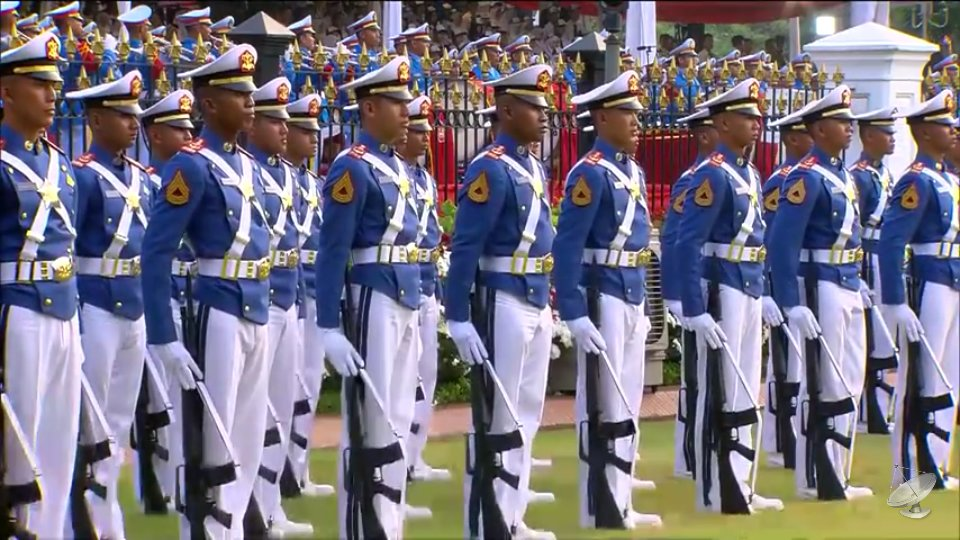
Indonesian Military cadets in parade uniform during the Indonesian independence day ceremony in the Merdeka Palace in Jakarta

Just like so many military academies in the world, the Indonesian Military Academy Magelang is a medium-sized, highly residential baccalaureate college, with a full-time, three-year undergraduate program that emphasizes instruction in the arts, sciences, and professions with a graduate program, preparing men and women to take on the challenge of being officers of the Indonesian Army. The academy is accredited by the Ministry of Education. Cadets who passed the initial selection process will first attend a 1-year basic program in the premises of the academy with students from the Air Force, Naval and Police academies, and remain there for the remainder of their studies.

=== Undergraduate program – academic ===
The academic program consists of a structured core of subjects depending on the cadet's chosen specialty as a future Army officer, balanced between the arts and sciences. Regardless of major, all cadets graduate with a Bachelor of Applied Defense Science degree. The majors are:

- Defense Administration
- Defense Management
- Defense Technologies
  - Civil
  - Machine-based
  - Electric

=== Undergraduate program – military ===
As all cadets are commissioned as second lieutenants upon graduation, military and leadership education is combined with academic instruction. Military training and discipline fall under the purview of the Office of the Vice Governor and Commandant of Cadets. Entering freshmen, or 3rd class cadets, which come from high school graduates of private and public educational institutions, are referred to as New Cadets, and enter the academy on Reception Day (in September) to start off their military service training as future officers and are recognized as full cadets in a ceremony in January the following year alongside cadets from the other service branches and the National Police, where they receive ceremonial daggers and the senior ranked cadets receive their Cadet Corporal sleeve insignia. The 2nd and 3rd years of study, aside from the usual academic work, also involve specialty training in the combat arms of the Army in their respective combat training schools stationed nationwide. Selected cadets are also selected for foreign exchange studies in the military academies of Singapore, Thailand, the Philippines, the United States, Malaysia, Singapore and Vietnam, among others.

The academy also has links with military academies in the Asia-Pacific, the United States Military Academy and the Royal Military College of Canada and thus also has a sizable number of foreign exchange cadets who graduate with a bachelor's degree and thus return to their countries of origin to serve in their ground forces as Second Lieutenants. Given its Dutch traditions as a former colonial territory, the academy is also linked with the Koninklijke Militaire Academie in Breda, The Netherlands.

At the end of their final year, the cadets after finishing their final exams, march at the academy fields in July in their graduation parade, and graduate within days in a national ceremony in Jakarta's Independence Palace, wherein the cadet valedictorian receives his/her Second Lieutenant shoulder board from the President of Indonesia, while the salutatorian recites with his/her fellow graduates the commissioned officers' oath of office.

== Cadet life ==
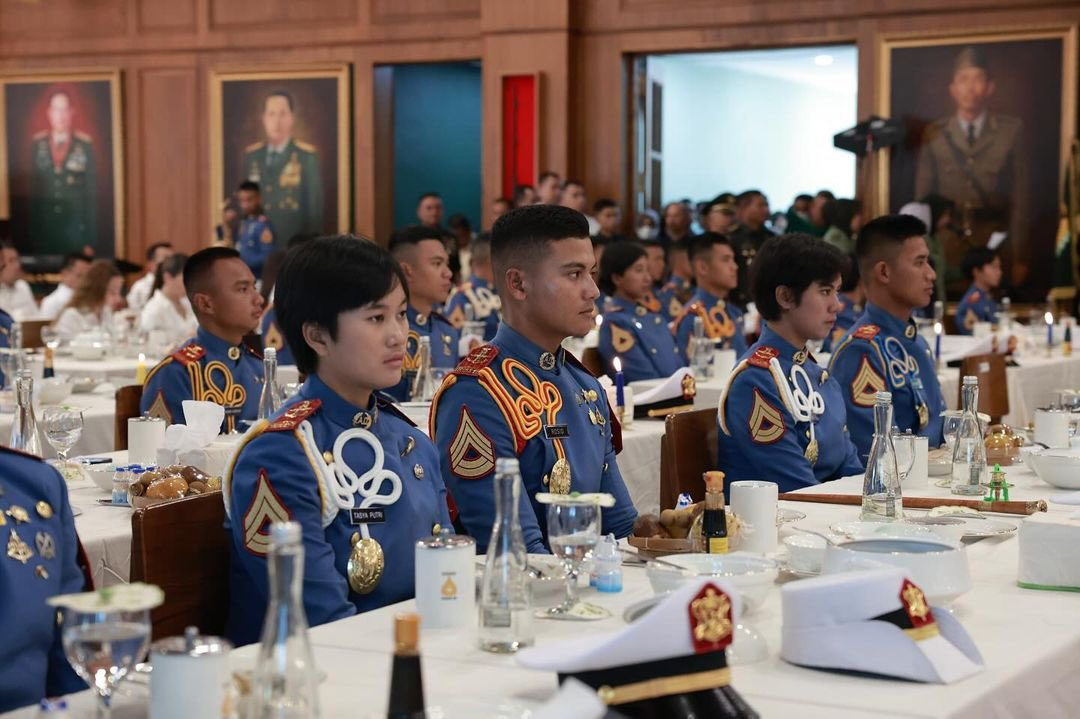
Indonesian Military Academy cadets inside the main mess hall in 2024

Cadets are not referred to as freshmen, sophomores, or seniors. Instead they are officially called third class, second class, and first class cadets, or generally as Taruna-Taruni Akmil (Cadets of the Academy) as a whole. As the national military college, its cadets, male and female, come from all over Indonesia as well as foreign exchange cadets from many countries of the world who study in its halls.

=== Corps of Drums "Canka Lokananta" and Regimental Band of the Military Academy ===
The Corps of Drums "Canka Lokananta" (Drum Band Genderang Seruling "Canka Lokananta", Canka Lokananta meaning sounds of heaven in Sanskrit) and the Regimental Band of the Military Academy Magelang (Satuan Musik Upacara Ajen Akademi Militer) are the official military band and corps of drums, respectively, of the Indonesian Military Academy, having started in April 1959 after the reopening of the Military Academy in its current Magelang campus, thus they are the senior premier musical representatives of the Indonesian Army, modeled on similar formations mounted by the Royal Netherlands East Indies Army Military School in Bandung, Gombong and Purworejo. While the Band (composed of 36 musicians) is staffed by active duty military personnel assigned to the academy, the Corps of Drums of around 182 drummers, fifers and trumpeters is composed of officer cadets that are part of the Corps of Cadets. Both organizations fulfill all of the official musical requirements of the academy, including military and patriotic ceremonies, public concerts, sporting events and radio and television broadcasts, as well as social activities for the Corps of Cadets, alumni of the academy and the entire community of Magelang, while appearing in all national events involving the Indonesian National Armed Forces as the seniormost field units of its military academies. While the Band is led by a Director of Music and a Bandmaster together with the Band Sergeant Major, the Corps of Drums is led by a Senior Drum Major and 4 Assistant Drum Majors (Penatarama), which lead the Corps on parades and ceremonies with their long maces to direct the drummers, fifers and trumpeters.

Former President Susilo Bambang Yudhoyono, himself a graduate of the Military Academy, was part of the drumline battery of the Corps of Drums, which changes every year from the incoming and outgoing musicians selected from amongst the ranks of the Corps. He was a tenor drummer during his stinct as part of this formation, and during a June 2014 visit, he was joined by fellow alumni musicians of the Corps of Drums of the 1973 graduating class.

== Notable alumni ==
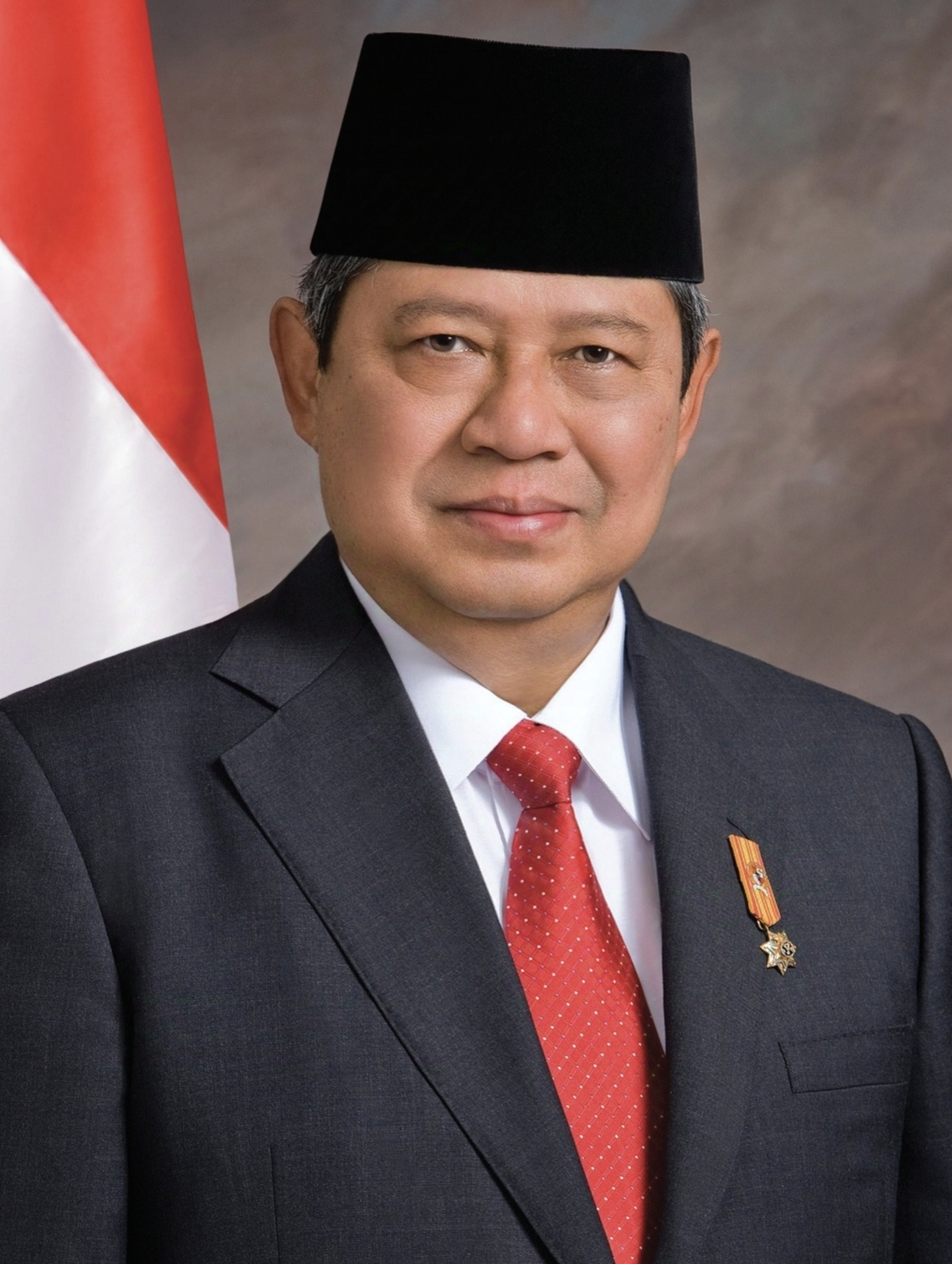
Susilo Bambang Yudhoyono, 6th President of Indonesia and former chairman of Democratic Party

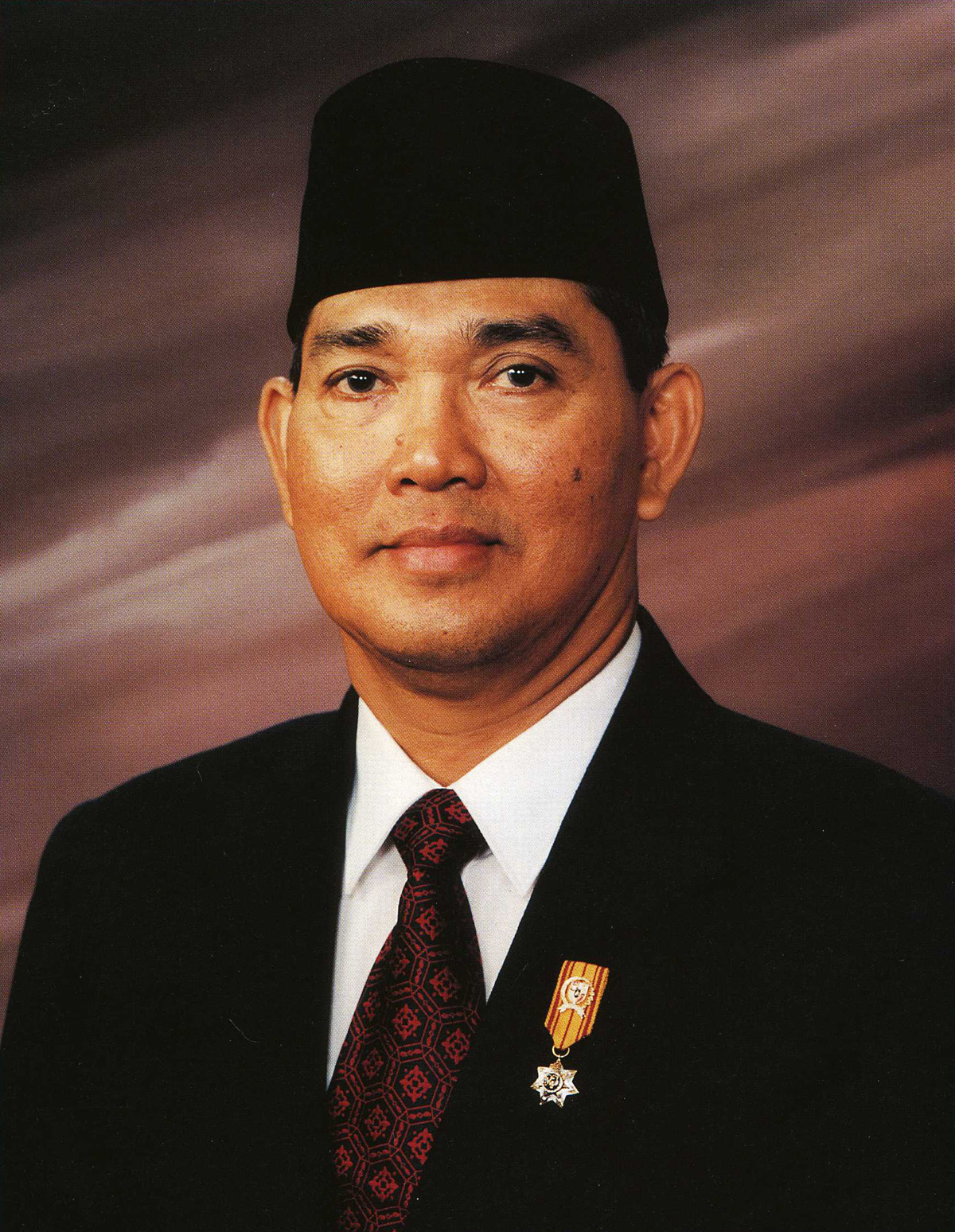
Try Sutrisno, 6th Vice President of Indonesia

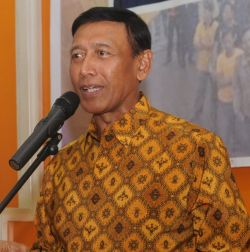
Wiranto, chairman of Hanura Party, 6th Coordinating Minister for Political, Legal, and Security Affairs, and 5th chairman of Presidential Advisory Council

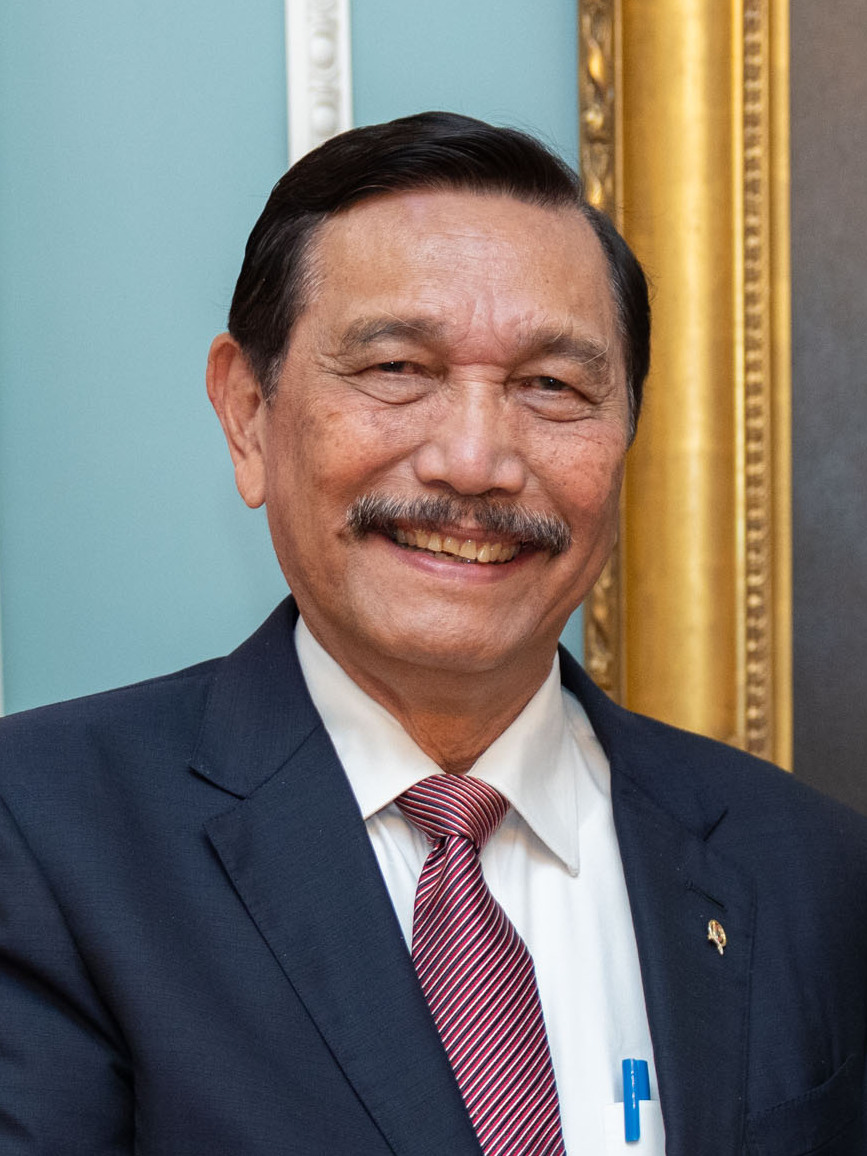
Luhut Binsar Pandjaitan, 5th Coordinating Minister of Maritime and Investment Affairs

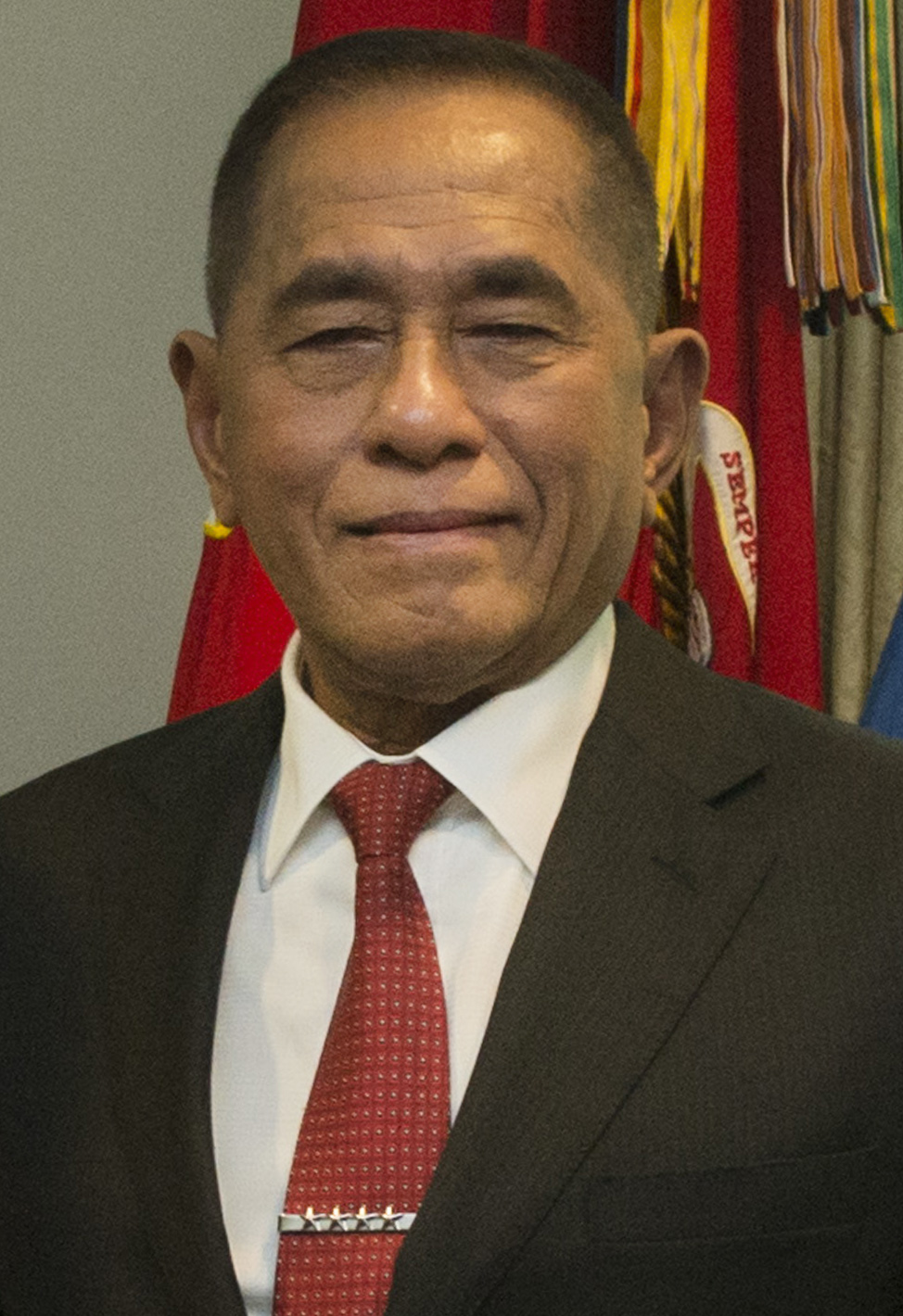
Ryamizard Ryacudu, 24th Minister of Defense and former Army Chief of Staff

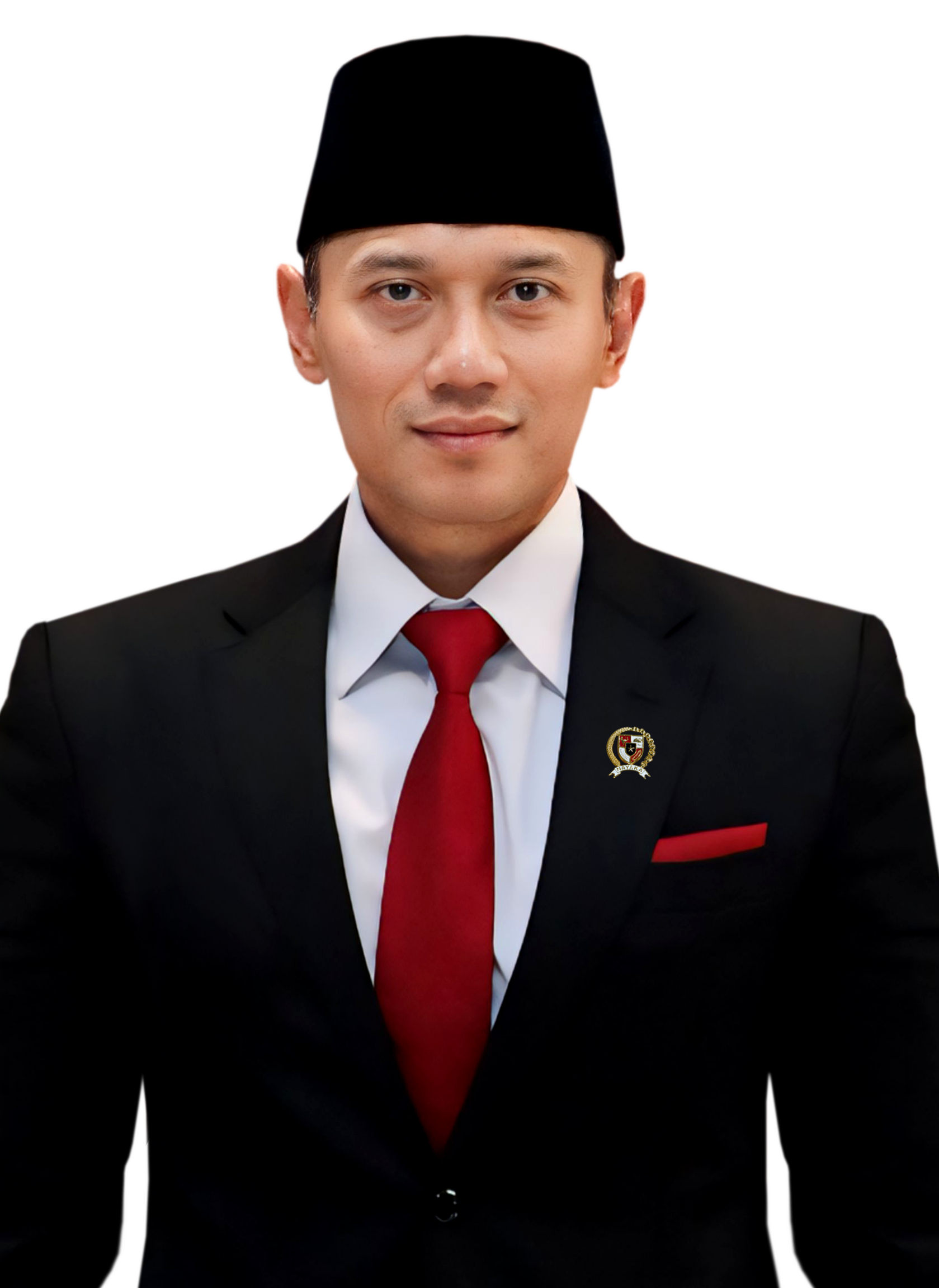
Agus Harimurti Yudhoyono, 15th Minister of Agrarian Affairs and Spatial Planning and chairman of Democratic Party

Prabowo Subianto, 8th President of Indonesia, chairman of Gerindra Party, and 25th Minister of Defense

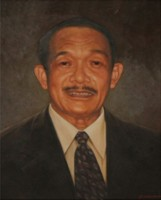
Ary Mardjono, secretary general of Golkar from 1993 until 1998

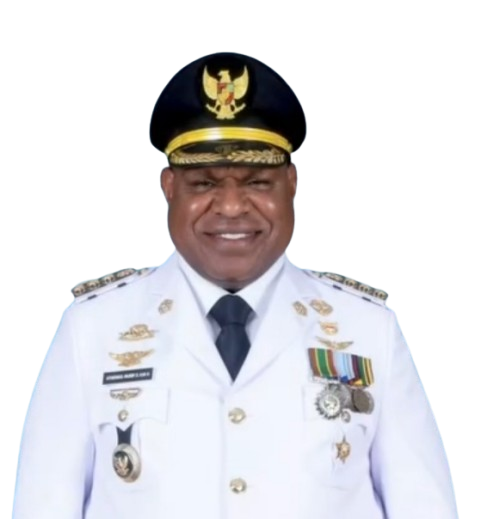
Atenius Murip, regent of Jayawijaya Regency, commander of the Jayawijaya Military District from 2022 to 2024

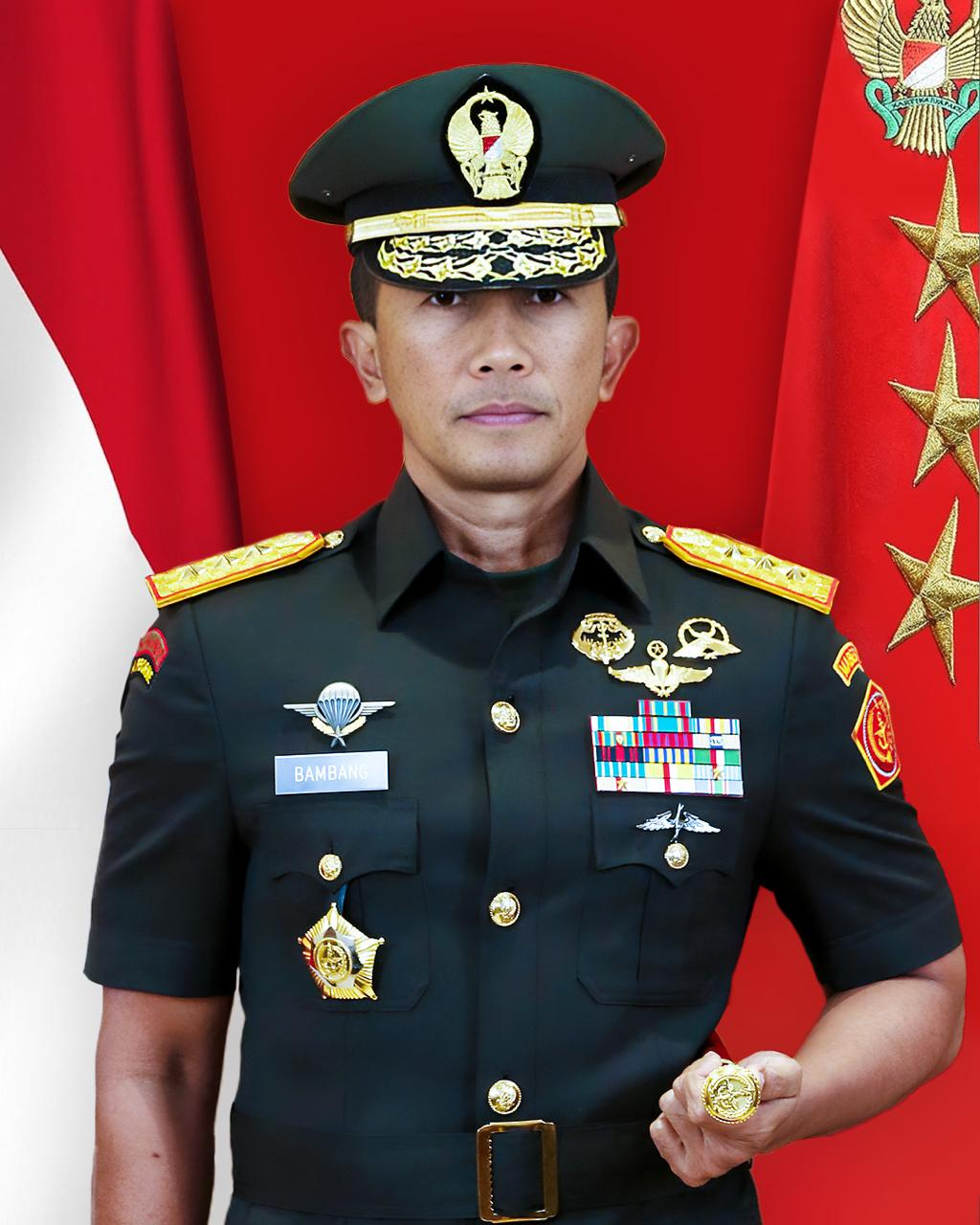
Bambang Trisnohadi, Chief of Staff for Territorial Affairs since 2026

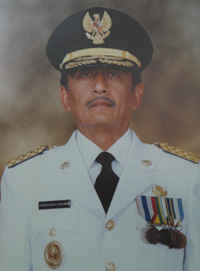
Basofi Sudirman, Governor of East Java between August 1993 and August 1998, Vice Governor of Jakarta between December 1987 and May 1993

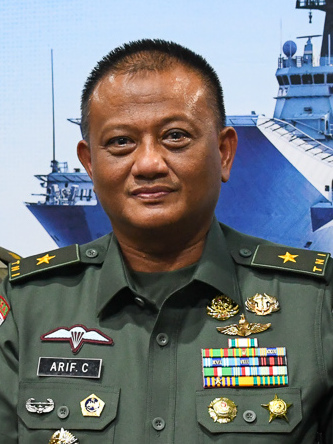
Arif Cahyono, Chief of the Army History Services from 2023 to 2025

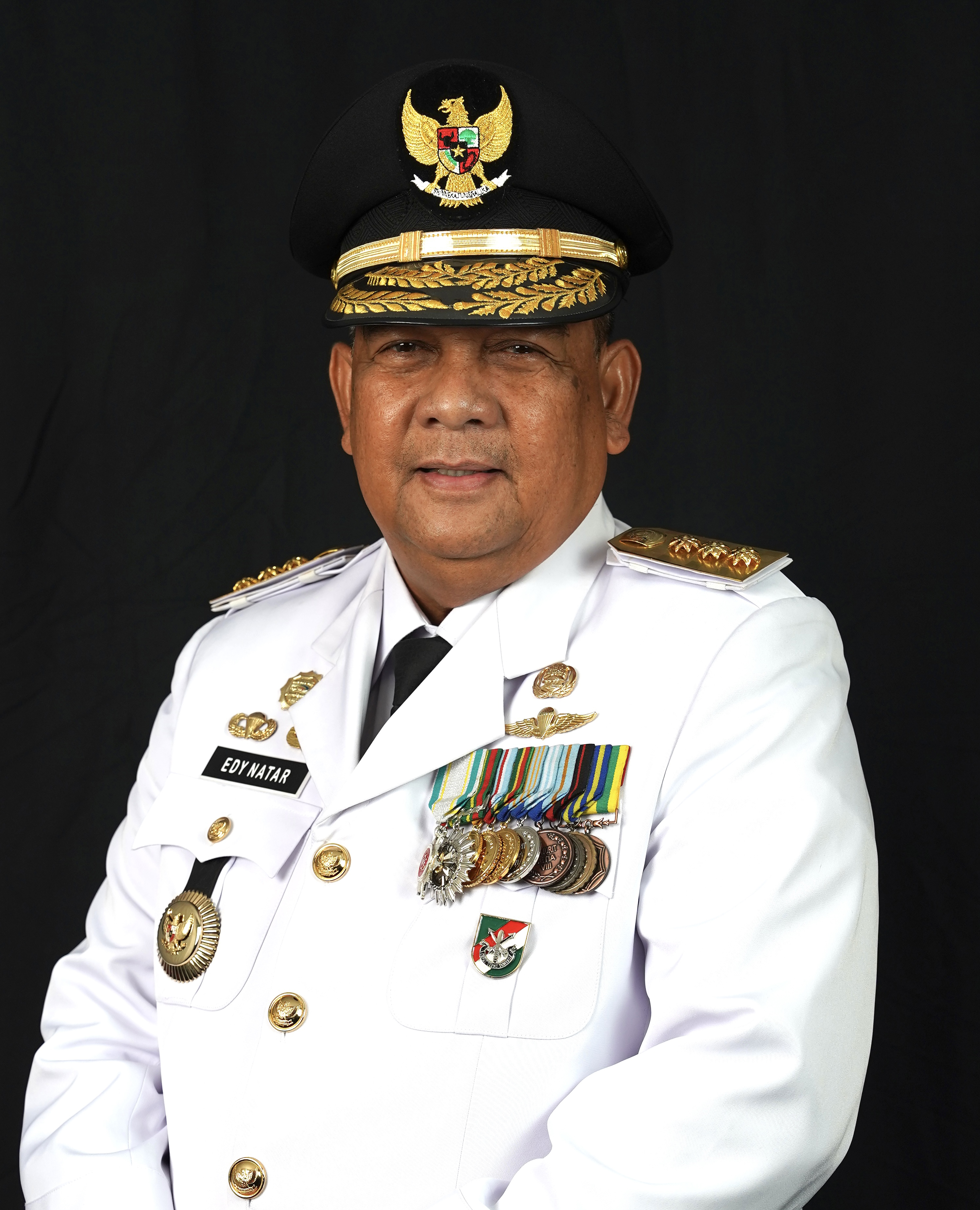
Edy Nasution, Governor of Riau between November 2023 and February 2024

== See also ==
- Indonesian National Armed Forces
- Indonesian Naval Academy
- Indonesian Air Force Academy
