= Arif Cahyono =

Indonesian army general

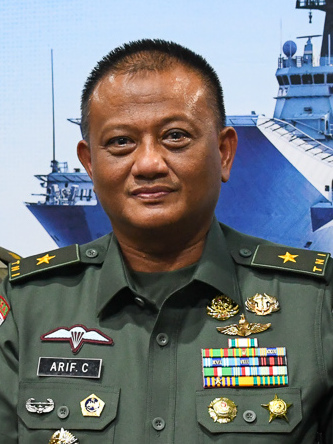
- Born: 23 June 1967 (age 59); Yogyakarta, Indonesia
- Military career
- Allegiance: Indonesia
- Branch: Indonesian Army
- Service years: 1990–present
- Rank: Brigadier general
- Unit: Infantry
- Commands: Banyuwangi Military District

Arif Cahyono (born 6 August 1975) is an Indonesian army general. He served as the Chief of the Army History Services from 2023 to 2025.

== Early life ==
Arif Cahyono was born on 23 Nopember 1967 in Yogyakarta, as the son of Ibnu Arba’i, former chief of the development planning agency of the Belitung Regency, and Suhartinah. He was the oldest children of his family. Upon completing high school, Arif Cahyono entered the Indonesian Military Academy and graduated in 1990.

== Career ==
Arif Cahyono began his career in the military as a platoon commander in the 431th Army Strategic Command Airborne Infantry Battalion in Makassar. He gradually rose through the ranks in the battalion, becoming the commander of rifle company in 1994, chief of operations in 1995, commander of the reserve company in 1996, and chief of personnel in 1999. During his time in the battalion, he received award as the best on duty officer during military operations in Papua.

Arif was reassigned to the army headquarters in 2000 as junior assistant officer for position and career management in the personnel staff of the army. He was in the position for five years until he was transferred to the Sriwijaya Regional Military Command in South Sumatra as the acting senior officer for personnel management from 2004 until 2005. He then became the chief of education at the regional military command's main regiment. On 14 June 2006, Arif was appointed as the Commander of the 502nd Infantry Battalion, a position he held until 10 June 2008. During Arif's command on the battalion, the battalion received an award as the best unit in the 18th Infantry Brigade.

After 2008, Arif was briefly reassigned to the Army Strategic Command as a senior assistant officer for career development. On the same year, he was appointed as the commander of the Banyuwangi Military District. He was in the position for a year until 2009 and returned to the army headquarters as a senior assistant officer for career and aptitude. Two years later, he was posted to the 2nd Army Strategic Command Infantry Division as assistant for personnel affairs.

In 2012, Arif was sent to attend regular course at the Indonesian Army Command and General Staff College. Upon completing the course, he was assigned to taught at the college for a year. He then studied again, this time at the Indonesian Armed Forces Command and General Staff College. He was then appointed as the assistant officer for personnel management in the army personnel staff in 2016.

Less than a year later, in April 2017 Arif was discharged from his position and imprisoned by the army for two months. Arif was accused of abusing his powers as assistant officer for personnel management by making a slide presentation about the competency of positions in the Ministry of Defense, the armed forces, and the army. Arif ordered a subordinate to search for the names of regional military commanders to complete his presentation, which was intended for his personal use and to influence the appointment of a deputy in the Executive Office of the President of the Republic of Indonesia. He was released in on 30 May 2017, with his arrest files subsequently handed over to the military court. The military court found him guilty for the crimes and sentenced him to four months of imprisonment.

Arif returned to military service after his release, where he held the office of expert staff for non-military operations in the 1st Joint Defence Command. In February 2022, Arif was appointed as the deputy personnel assistant to the army chief of staff for personnel management. He was promoted to the rank of brigadier general on 6 April. His portofolio as deputy personnel assistant was changed to personnel planning in May 2023.

On 12 December, Arif was officially installed as the Chief of the Army History Service. As the army's history chief, Arif announced his support for the Belitung government to name AS Hanandjoeddin, one of Belitung's former chiefs, as a national hero. Arif visited Belitung as well as assisting the regional government of Belitung by compiling available data on Hanandjoeddin in the army's history office. He ended his tenure as history chief on 28 May 2025 and was reassigned to the army headquarters.
