= Ashar Sunyoto Munandar =

Indonesian psychologist (1931–2005)

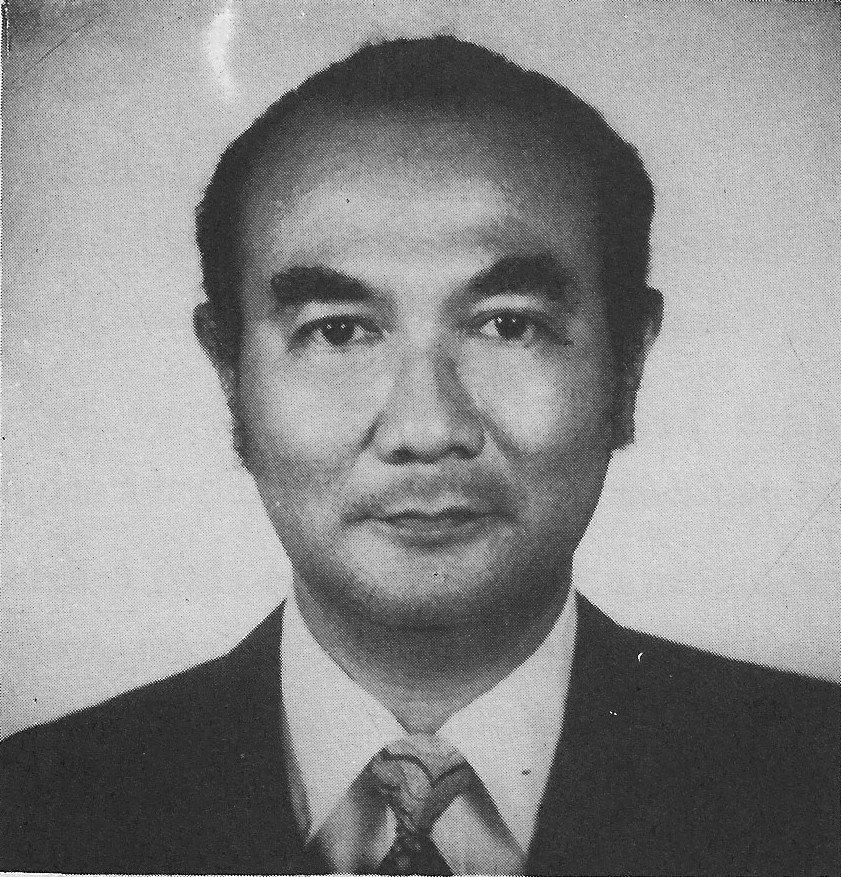

Dean of the Faculty of Psychology of the University of Indonesia
- In office 17 February 1981 – 17 March 1984
- Preceded by: Saparinah Sadli
- Succeeded by: Soesmalijah Soewondo

Personal details
- Born: December 9, 1934 Batavia, Dutch East Indies
- Died: June 2, 2005 (aged 70)
- Spouse: Sukarni Catur Utami Munandar (m. 1959)
- Education: Leiden University; University of Hamburg; University of Indonesia (Dr, Prof)

Academic background
- Thesis: The Identification of Potential Middle Managers: A Systems Approach (1977)
- Doctoral advisor: Ch. J. de Wolff; Slamet Iman Santoso; J. E. Ismael

Academic work
- Discipline: Psychology
- Sub-discipline: Industrial and organizational psychology

Ashar Sunyoto Munandar (23 March 1931 – 2 June 2005) was an Indonesian psychologist and professor emeritus at the Faculty of Psychology, University of Indonesia. He is known for his expertise in industrial and organizational psychology, and his advocacy for lifelong learning.

== Early life and education ==
Ashar Sunyoto Munandar was born on 23 March 1931 in Semarang. He developed a passion for reading at a young age, particularly enjoying books like "Dik Trom", "Pietje Bell" and works by Dr. Karl May, which sparked his imagination and broadened his understanding of the world. He attended Frobelschool and Neutrale Lagere School (equivalent to elementary school) in Semarang. He was particularly impressed by the school's emphasis on social responsibility, requiring students to donate a penny to charity every Monday, and its encouragement of reading, allowing students to borrow a book every Saturday.

His education was disrupted by the Japanese occupation of Indonesia, forcing him to attend Sempurna People's School (equivalent to elementary school) in Sompok. This experience, though initially challenging, taught him adaptability and independence. He later attended various middle schools, including the 1st State High School in Surakarta, but his studies were interrupted by the Indonesian Revolution. He continued his education at the 1st State High School in Manahan, Surakarta, but again faced disruptions due to the Madiun Affair and the Dutch military operations in Yogyakarta and Solo. Despite these challenges, he remained committed to his education and eventually graduated from high school after a period of self-study.

After graduating, he received a scholarship from the office of student demobilization and enrolled at the Faculty of Engineering of the University of Indonesia (now the Bandung Institute of Technology) in Bandung. However, he soon switched to the Faculty of Exact Science and Mathematics, only to change his mind again after hearing a speech by Slamet Iman Santoso on psychology. He then received a scholarship to study the subject at the Leiden University, where he developed a deep interest in psychology. Upon receiving his associate degree from the university in 1956, he continued his studies at the University of Hamburg in West Germany and received a full bachelor's degree in 1959.

Ashar received his doctorate from the University of Indonesia after successfully defending his thesis on 13 August 1977, titled The Identification of Potential Middle Managers: A Systems Approach. In his thesis, he argued regarding the difficulties in employing managers that were ready for use.

== Career ==
Ashar joined the psychology department at the University of Indonesia's medical faculty in 1959, fulfilling his government work obligation. After the department was established as a separate faculty, he became the faculty's research coordinator from 1960 to 1961. He also served as head of the vocational and industrial psychology department from 1961 to 1967. During this period from 1963 to 1965 as the faculty's deputy dean for student and alumni affairs.

Ashar also became the supervisor for the 1967 class of the faculty, coordinating the class to pick their special interest in psychology (stage pendalaman) after the class received their baccalaureate from 1969 to 1970. He also taught at the Nijmegen Catholic University as a guest lecturer from 1975 to 1976. Ashar became the director for applied psychological institute of the faculty in 1978, and on 6 December 1980 was appointed as a full professor in psychology.

Outside the university, Ashar was a member of a special advisory body to the Department of Higher Education and Knowledge for psychology education from 1961 to 1963. From 1963 to 1965, he advised the Department of Social Affairs on the child welfare bill. He also served as an advisor for psychological affairs to the National Atomic Energy Agency from 1963 to 1966, the Indonesian Development Bank from 1977, and as an expert staff in the Southeast Asian Ministers of Education Organization Regional Center of Educational Innovation and Technology in Singapore from 1970 to 1972. Ashar was the chief psychologist at the Bank Negara Indonesia.

=== Dean of the psychology faculty ===
In March 1980, Ashar was nominated by the faculty's senate for the position of dean, alongside Soesmalijah Soewondo. The senate decided to vote for Soesmalijah with a 38–21 result. However, Ashar had already accepted the offer of the minister of education for the position, and the minister decided to overrule the results. The appointment was viewed as unjust by faculty members and student, causing mass resignation from the academic staffs of the faculty, including from Slamet Iman Santoso and Soesmalijah herself. Fuad Hassan, who was then the director of the foreign ministry's research and development body, stated his reluctance to cooperate with Ashar.

From February 19 to 26, students from the faculty organized a general strike protesting the appointment. In order to avoid student protests, who had already occupied the rector's meeting office, Ashar was secretly installed by rector Mahar Mardjono at his office on 17 February 1981. Ashar then appointed J. Kandou—who described himself as having good relations with both Soesmalijah and Ashar—as deputy dean of the psychology faculty for administrative affairs.

During his tenure as dean, from 1982 to 1983 Ashar also served as head of the master's degree in industrial and organizational psychology. Ashar was eventually replaced by Soesmalijah on 17 March 1984.

== Personal life and views ==
Ashar Sunyoto Munandar married his childhood friend, Utami Boentaran, in 1958 in Hamburg. Utami Boentaran is a renowned psychologist specializing in educational psychology for gifted children. They have four children and eight grandchildren.

Ashar Sunyoto Munandar is a strong advocate for lifelong learning. He believes that individuals should continuously learn and adapt to changing circumstances. He emphasizes the importance of learning from experience, from others, and from the environment. He believes that individuals should strive to improve their skills and knowledge throughout their lives.
