= Bambang Trisnohadi =

Indonesian military officer (born 1972)

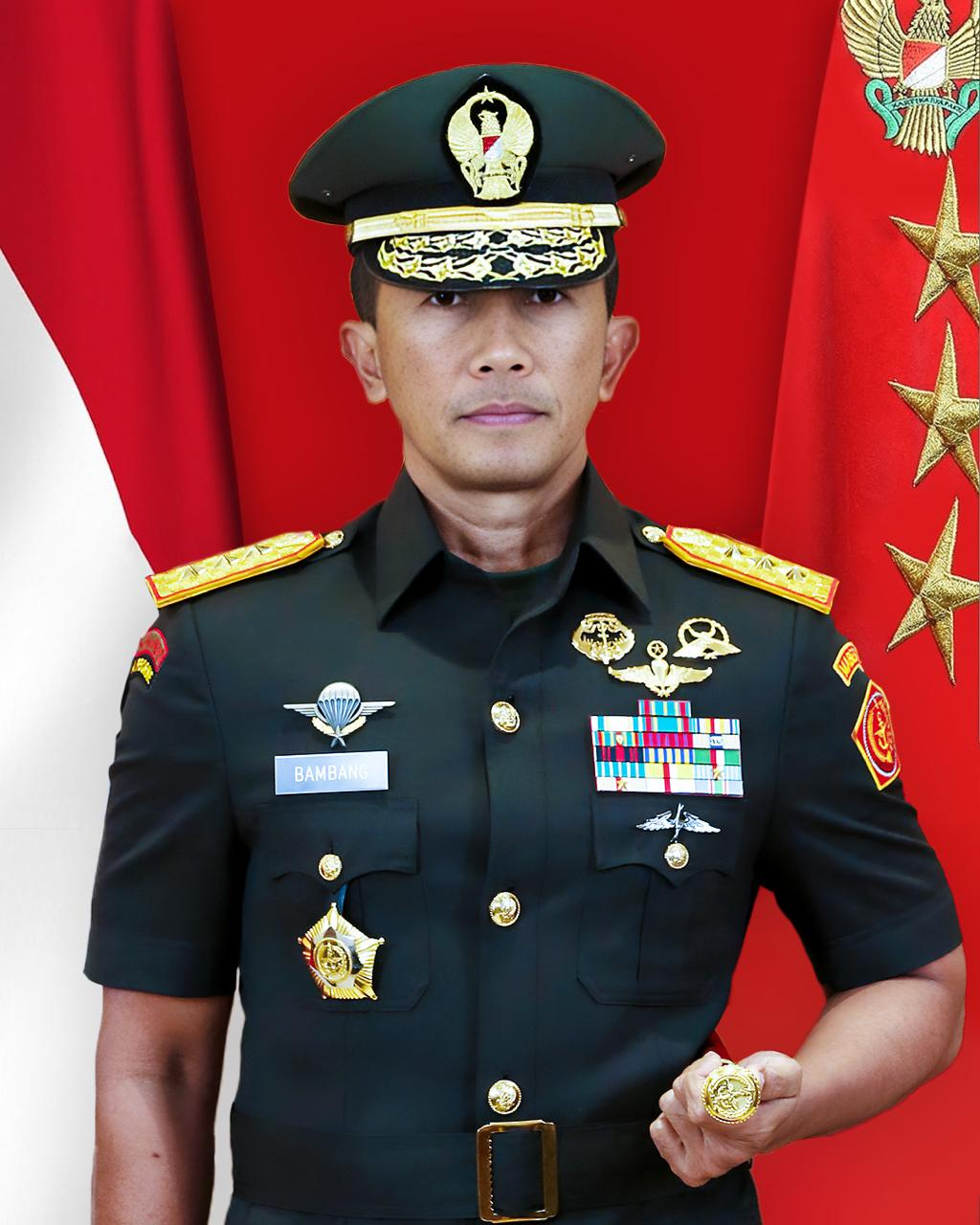
- Born: 26 February 1972 (age 54); Jakarta, Indonesia
- Education: Indonesian Military Academy
- Military career
- Branch: Indonesian Army
- Service years: 1993–present
- Rank: Lieutenant general
- Service number: 11930084610272
- Unit: Infantry
- Commands: Chief of Staff for Territorial Affairs; 3rd Defense Territorial Joint Command; Nusa Tenggara (Udayana) Regional Military Command; West Kalimantan (Alambha Wanawai) Military Area Command; Indonesian military academy's cadet regiment 315th Garuda Infantry Battalion

Director General of Defence Strategy
- In office 11 November 2022 – 1 April 2024
- Preceded by: Rodon Pedrason
- Succeeded by: Ujang Darwis

Bambang Trisnohadi (born 26 February 1972) is an Indonesian army general who is currently serving as the chief of staff for territorial affairs of the armed forces, holding the position since 26 March 2026. Prior to his current position, Bambang served in a number of prominent army positions, including as director general of defence strategy under defense minister Prabowo Subianto from 2022 to 2024. He also commanded the Nusa Tenggara (Udayana) Regional Military Command in 2024 and the 3rd Defense Territorial Joint Command from 2024 to 2026.

== Early life and education ==
Bambang was born in Jakarta on 26 February 1972 as the son of Major-General Suhadi, a retired army legal general who last served as the chief of the supreme military court. Following his father's assignment in legal establishment across Jakarta, Bambang spent most of his childhood in Jakarta and attended the 1st (Budi Utomo) Jakarta State High School. Despite the school student's habit of interschool brawl with its neighboring Budi Utomo Vocational High School, Bambang stated that he was never involved as he would go home before the fights start. In February 1988, Bambang won third prize in a poster competition held by the UN office in Jakarta. Bambang received a score of 56 for his national final examination, one of the highest of his cohort.

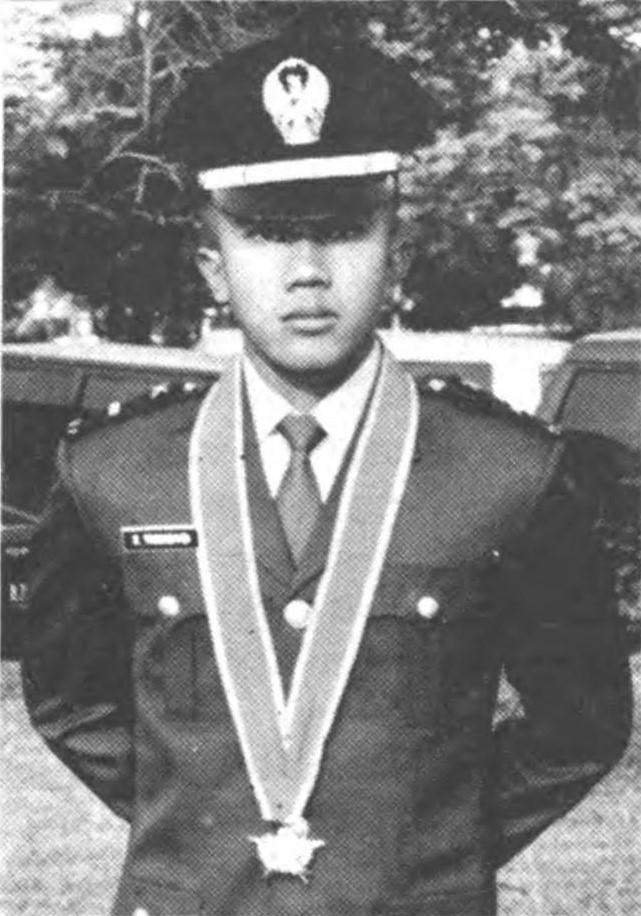
Bambang shortly after his commissioning as a second lieutenant of the infantry corps.

Upon graduating from high school, Bambang entered the Indonesian Military Academy, influenced by one of his relative who told stories about life in the army. As a cadet, Bambang remarked that he felt uneasy being associated with his father and avoided preferential treatment from his colleagues and instructors. In his first year, he won a gold medal in shooting at the Second Army Games, defeating much tougher opponents from the special forces, territorial commands, and other units. Bambang graduated from the academy on 24 July 1993 and was commissioned as a second lieutenant of the infantry corps. He received the Adhi Makayasa award, a distinction given to the best graduates of each armed forces branch cohort.

== Military career ==
Bambang underwent several military courses before entering the army's special forces, Kopassus. In line with his wishes, Bambang was deployed to East Timor shortly after joining Kopassus. Throughout the course of his career, Bambang was assigned to various command and technical positions within Kopassus and visited various countries throughout his assignment, including United States, France, Singapore, Australia, Malaysia, South Korea, Thailand, and Vietnam. By 2008, Bambang left his posting as the assistant for operations to Kopassus anti terror unit to pursue further military education at the Indonesian Army Command and General Staff College. He completed his education on the same year with the distinction as the best graduate of his cohort.

After a two-year stint at the presidential security force, in 2010 Bambang became the commander of the 315th Garuda Infantry Battalion in Bogor. He served for about a year, as by mid-2011 he was attached as staff to United Nations Interim Force in Lebanon force commander Alberto Asarta. Bambang returned to Indonesia on the same year and became personal secretary to the army vice chief of staff Budiman. On 27 December 2012, Bambang became commander of the group A of the presidential security forces, which was responsible for directly guiding the president and his family. He was then promoted to the rank of colonel, becoming the first from his class of 1993 to attain the rank. As commander, Bambang signed an agreement with the state-owned telecommunications company Telkom Indonesia to establish a broadband learning center in the group's headquarters. Bambang was replaced on 21 October 2014 by Maruli Simanjuntak. By 5 November that year, he had moved to East Kalimantan as the assistant for operation to the Mulawarman Regional Military Command, with jurisdiction over the east, south, and north Kalimantan provinces. During the 2015 independence day celebrations, Bambang was entrusted to lead the flag lowering ceremony at the Istana Negara, prompting speculations about his further promotion in the army.

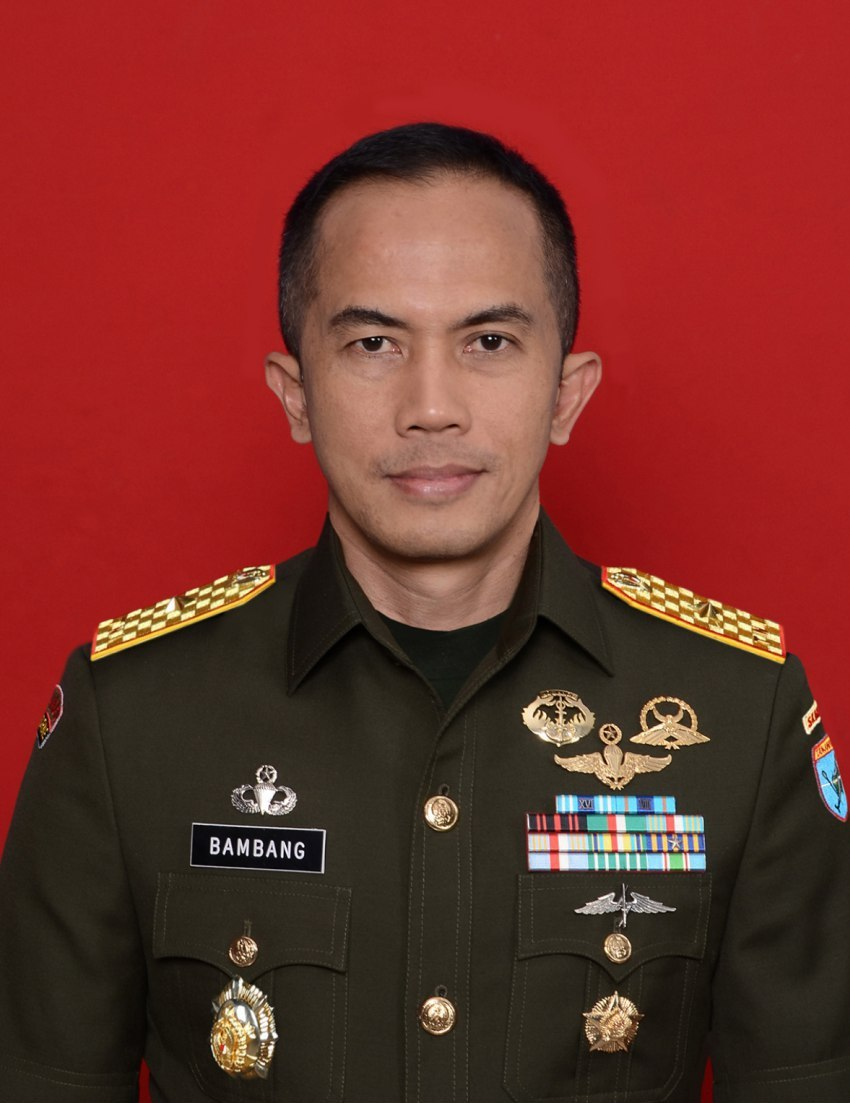
Bambang as a one-star general, serving as commander of the West Kalimantan military area.

Bambang's tenure as assistant for operations ended four days after the ceremony. Bambang then returned to the army headquarters in Jakarta, serving as the coordinator of personal staffs to army chief of staff Mulyono. He then left the headquarters in 2017 for a year of study at the joint command and general staff college. At the end of his studies in December 2017, Bambang received the Wira Adi Nugraha award as the best graduate of his class. For his best graduation distinction in the military academy and the two command and general staff colleges, Bambang was nicknamed the "hat-trick general".

Several months later, on 5 March 2018 Bambang became the commander of the Indonesian military academy's cadet regiment. Bambang completed his duties in the academy on 18 October that year before being appointed to the one-star post of the commander of the 121st Alambha Wanawai Military Area Command, covering the province of West Kalimantan, five days later. Bambang was accordingly promoted to the rank of brigadier general on 28 December.

After approximately two years of service in West Kalimantan, on 9 April 2020 the commander of the armed forces issued a decree which appointed Bambang as the chief of staff of the Cenderawasih (Papua) Regional Military Command. Bambang handed over his duties as West Kalimantan's military commander on 22 April 2020 and commenced his duties in Papua on 6 May 2020. About a year and a half later, on 6 December 2021 Bambang was relegated as inspector of the army territorial center. He handed over his old duties as chief of staff the next day.

Bambang's short-lived relegation ended with his promotion to senior advisor for security affairs to defense minister Prabowo Subianto through a decree issued on 19 April 2022. He was officially sworn in to the position on 6 July 2022 and was promoted to the rank of major general shortly afterwards. On 11 November of the same year, Bambang became the defense ministry's director general for defence strategy. As director general, Bambang co-chaired several international forums related to defence issues, such as the Indonesia–U.S. Senior Officials' 2+2 Foreign Policy Dialogue and Defense Dialogue and the ASEAN Defense Ministers' Meeting in 2023.

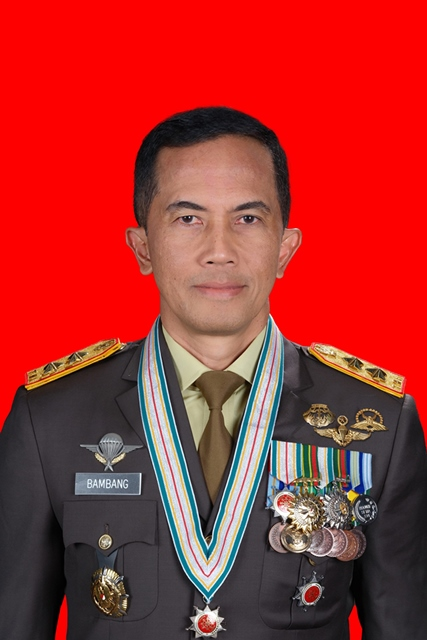
Bambang as the commander of the Udayana Regional Military Command.

From the defense ministry, Bambang was entrusted to command the Udayana Regional Military Command, which covers the provinces of Bali, East Nusa Tenggara, and West Nusa Tenggara, through a decree issued on 21 February 2024. He officially assumed office on 8 March. During his five months in office, Bambang managed to implement the military regional command's program on improving village-level security and constructing new drilled wells in provinces under its jurisdiction. Bambang also visited several military districts in East and West Nusa Tenggara, though he expressed his regret not being able to visit all of the military district due to his very brief stint.

Bambang received another promotion with his appointment as the commander of the 3rd Defense Territorial Joint Command on 24 July 2024. Bambang was sworn in for the position on 28 August and received his third star accordingly on 3 September. Following Prabowo Subianto's victory in the 2024 Indonesian presidential election, military observer Aris Santoso speculated that Bambang is being groomed by Prabowo to be his army chief of staff and predicted Bambang's next posting was to command Kostrad, the army's main warfare unit.

In March 2026, several news outlets reported the appointment of Bambang to the re-established post of the chief of staff for territorial affairs of the armed forces. The position had been non-existent for half a century since its dissolution in 2001 as part of reforms aimed to abolish the dual function of the armed forces. The armed forces spokesperson later confirmed the reports but did not comment further on the re-established post. Military analyst Selamat Ginting questioned whether the new post marked the return of the old style territorial order or the adaptation of the armed forces to unconventional threats. Bambang was sworn in by the armed forces commander in a handover ceremony on 26 March 2026.
