= Sumahadi =

Indonesian forester (1943–2019)

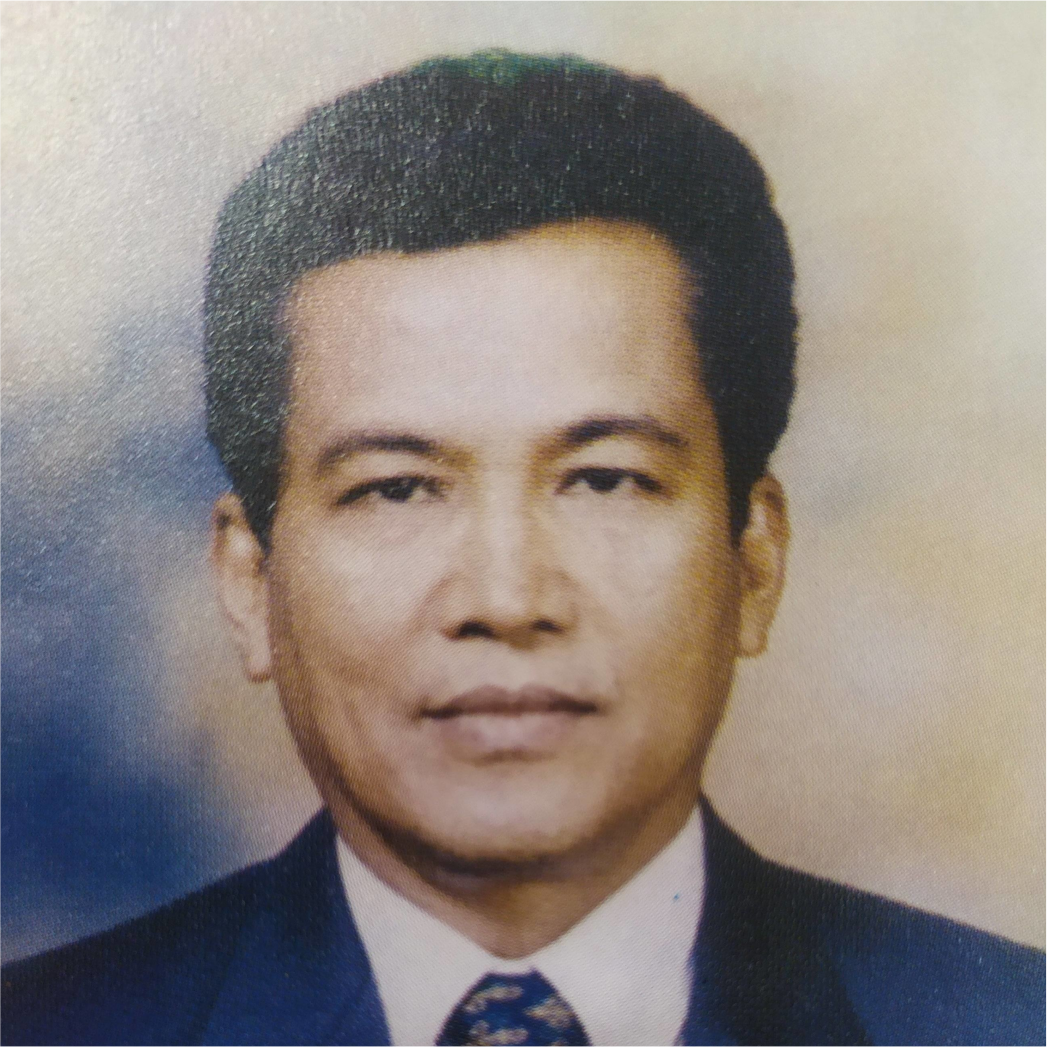
- Sumahadi in 1998

Minister of Forestry and Plantations
- In office 16 March 1998 – 21 May 1998
- President: Suharto
- Preceded by: Djamaluddin Suryohadikusumo (Minister of Forestry)
- Succeeded by: Muslimin Nasution

Director General of Forest Inventarization and Land Use
- In office 20 April 1995 – 16 March 1998
- Minister: Djamaluddin Suryohadikusumo
- Preceded by: Titus Sarijanto
- Succeeded by: Soebagjo Hadiseputro

Personal details
- Born: 8 November 1943 Pekalongan, Central Java, Dutch East Indies
- Died: 2 March 2019 (aged 75) Depok, West Java, Indonesia
- Spouse: Retno Indah Winarni (m. 1969)
- Children: 4
- Education: Gadjah Mada University (Ir.); Colegio de San Juan de Letran (MBA)

Sumahadi (8 November 1943 – 2 March 2019) was an Indonesian forester who served as the Minister of Forestry and Plantations in Suharto's last cabinet, the Seventh Development Cabinet. He was a career bureaucrat in the Department of Forestry, serving in a number of prominent positions in the department such as the Director General of Reforestation and Land Rehabilitation from 1993 to 1995 and Director General of Forest Inventarization and Land Use from 1995 to 1998.

== Early life and education ==
Born in Pekalongan on 8 November 1943, Sumahadi completed high school at his birthplace before pursuing higher education at the Faculty of Forestry, Gadjah Mada University (UGM). Notably, Sumahadi was the only student in his cohort to graduate without submitting a traditional thesis, as his “management practice report” was deemed equivalent by his advisor, Soedarwono. Sumahadi later continued his studies at the Colegio de San Juan de Letran, receiving his Master of Business Administration in 1992.

== Career ==
Sumahadi began his professional experience as a civil servant in the Central Kalimantan Forestry Office on 1 October 1972, serving as the chief of forestry guidance. During his tenure in the office, he attended a one-year course at ITC Enschede, which he completed in 1975. He was then transferred to the state-owned Perhutani company, which managed Indonesia's forests, in Central Java in 1977. He fulfilled his field duties despite lacking official transportation. He relied on public buses, motorcycles, or even walking to reach remote locations.

Less than a year later, on 1 June 1978 Sumahadi was assigned as the supervisor of the Surakarta Forest and attended a course on ideology and management in 1971. By 1 November 1981, he was transferred as a supervisor in the Pati Forest. After about a decade of service in East Java, on 24 August 1984 Sumahadi was appointed as the chief of the forestry department's regional office in Jambi. During an encounter with the indigenous Orang Rimba people in Bukit Duabelas, Sumahadi was equivaled to a monarch and he was given a tribal loincloth as a sign of honor. He was offered a fermented venison by the people, although he tactfully declined by claiming to be on a 40-day fast. He attended a course on national alertness in 1986, and on leadership in 1987.

Sumahadi returned to Central Kalimantan with his appointment as the chief of the forestry department's regional office in the province on 1 April 1989. On one occasion, while traveling by boat in Central Kalimantan, a staff member who could not swim fell into the river. Sumahadi immediately instructed the individual to climb onto his back, enabling him to swim to safety. In another incident, he directed a mechanic to pull a non-swimmer out of the river by the hair, saving the individual’s life.

After serving in different regions in Indonesia, Sumahadi attended a regular course at the National Resilience Institute in 1991. He was then recalled to Jakarta to serve in the Directorate General of Forest Inventory and Land Use. From 1991 to 1992, Sumahadi was the Director of Forest Delimitation and Mapping in the directorate general, and from 1992 to 1993 he was the directorate general's secretary, the second most senior official in the directorate general. On 28 June 1993, Sumahadi assumed office as the Director General of Reforestation and Land Rehabilitation, reporting directly to the Minister of Forestry. Two years later, on 20 April 1995 Sumahadi became the Director General of Forest Inventory and Land Use. In his capacity as a director general, Sumahadi allegedly colluded with Indonesian timber tycoons.

During a ministerial meeting, Sumahadi proposed integrating the Directorate General of Plantations within the Ministry of Forestry to streamline management. Sumahadi's suggestion was ultimately adopted with the formation of the Department of Forestry and Plantations in Suharto's Seventh Development Cabinet. Sumahadi was appointed to head the new ministry, serving from 14 March to 21 May 1998. Sumahadi had been named as a strong candidate for forest minister by the media since 1997. As minister, Sumahadi proposed using forest areas as a foundation for national food security, by focusing on integrating rice cultivation within forest lands through an intercropping system. His proposal, which was known as the food reserve forest concept, drew on his experience in Perhutani. However, this concept was never implemented due to his very brief tenure.

Sumahadi, along with several other ministers in the cabinet, signed the Bappenas declaration which pressured President Suharto to resign. Sumahadi lost his position in the department upon Suharto's resignation, and he became a senior instructor in the department's training agency.

== Personal life ==
Sumahadi was married to Retno Indah Winarni in 1969, whom he met as a drummer during his studies in the Gadjah Mada University. The couple had two daughters, a son, and adopted a daughter.

Sumahadi died on 2 March 2019 at the Puri Cinere Hospital in Depok, West Java, after suffering sickness for one and a half years. He was buried at the Giritama Cemetery.

== Awards ==
- Civil Servants' Long Service Medal, 2nd Class (1977)
- Star of Service, 1st Class (1998)
