= Ary Mardjono =

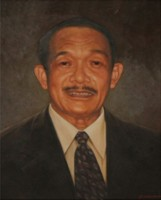

State Minister of Agrarian Affairs Head of the National Land Agency
- In office 14 March 1998 – 21 May 1998
- President: Suharto
- Preceded by: Soni Harsono
- Succeeded by: Hasan Basri Durin

Member of the House of Representatives
- In office 1 October 1997 – 14 March 1998
- Constituency: East Java

Personal details
- Born: 10 December 1936 Madiun, East Java, Dutch East Indies
- Died: 9 August 2020 (aged 81) Cempaka Putih, Jakarta, Indonesia
- Party: People's Conscience Party
- Other political affiliations: Golkar (before 2002); Concern for the Nation Functional Party (2002–2006)
- Spouse: Sri Fatimah

Military service
- Allegiance: Indonesia
- Branch/service: Indonesian Army
- Years of service: 1962 – 1991
- Rank: Lieutenant general
- Unit: Equipment Corps

Ary Mardjono (10 December 1936 – 9 August 2020) was an Indonesian retired military officer and politician who was the secretary general of Golkar from 1993 until 1998. He briefly served as the minister of agrarian affairs for several months in 1998. After the fall of the Suharto regime, Ary joined the Concern for the Nation Functional Party and become its secretary general. He then moved to the People's Conscience Party following the dissolution of the prior party.

== Early life ==
Ary was born in Madiun, East Java, on 10 December 1936. He entered the Indonesian Military Academy upon graduating high school in 1959. He was commissioned as a second lieutenant of the equipment corps upon completing his military education in 1962. He studied at the United States Army Command and General Staff College in 1971, the Joint Command and Staff School in 1978, and a regular course at the National Resilience Institute in 1986.

== Career ==
Ary began his service in the army as the commander of a maintenance platoon at the main regiment of the Pattimura Military Command in Ambon. He was then transferred to the equipment unit of the military command a year later, before being transferred to Jakarta to serve as the chief of planning at the Army Equipment Services. Upon serving in the army equipment services, he was transferred to the Army Strategic Reserve Command (Kostrad) as chief of supply in the Kostrad airborne division and as the chief of intelligence in Kostrad's equipment services.

After completing his military studies at the United States Army Command and General Staff College, Ary returned to Indonesia and taught at the Indonesian Army Command and General Staff College for two years, from 1972 to 1974. He was then sent to Vietnam as part of the 8th Garuda Contingent, and returned to Indonesia three years later to study at the Joint Command and Staff School.

Ary was then appointed to various assistant office in the armed forces upon finishing Joint Command and Staff School. He was the assistant for inventory in the material corps of the army logistic command from 1978 until 1990, assistant for planning in the Army Material Services from 1980 until 1983, and assistant for planning in the Diponegoro Military Command from 1983 until 1985. His last office in the military was director of education and teaching at the Indonesian Army Command and General Staff College, which he held from 1986 until 1988.

On 20 September 1988, Ary was installed as the assistant to the minister of state secretary for relations with supreme state institutions. Consequently, as a civil servant, he joined Golkar, the government's party at that time, and became the chief secretary of Golkar's advisory body. He was elected as Golkar's secretary general for the 1993 – 1998 term, alongside Harmoko as the party's chairman.

In the 1997 Indonesian legislative election, Ary was elected to the House of Representatives after being nominated as the party's topmost candidate for the East Java electoral district. A year later, on 14 March 1998 President Suharto appointed him as State Minister of Agrarian Affairs in the Seventh Development Cabinet. Ary was granted an honorary promotion to the rank of lieutenant general on 3 April 1998. The cabinet was dissolved on 21 May 1998 upon the resignation of President Suharto.
