= Ferry Mursyidan Baldan =

Indonesian politician (1961–2022)

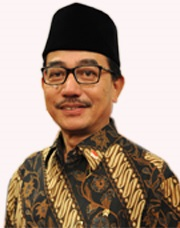
- Baldan in 2014

Minister of Agrarian Affairs and Spatial Planning
- In office 27 October 2014 – 27 July 2016
- Preceded by: Hasan Basri Durin (1999)
- Succeeded by: Sofyan Djalil

Head of the National Land Agency
- In office 27 October 2014 – 27 July 2016
- Preceded by: Hendarman Supandji
- Succeeded by: Sofyan Djalil

Member of the People's Representative Council
- In office 1997–2009
- Constituency: Bandung

Personal details
- Born: 16 June 1961 Jakarta, Indonesia
- Died: 2 December 2022 (aged 61) Jakarta, Indonesia
- Party: Golkar (1992–2011); Nasdem (2011–2018)
- Education: Padjadjaran University

Ferry Mursyidan Baldan (16 June 1961 – 2 December 2022) was an Indonesian politician. A member of Golkar and later Nasdem, he served in the People's Representative Council from 1997 to 2009 and served as Minister of Agrarian Affairs and Spatial Planning from 2014 to 2016.

Baldan was found dead in his vehicle in Jakarta on 2 December 2022, at the age of 61.
