= Soesmalijah Soewondo =

Indonesian psychologist and university faculty dean (1934–2019)

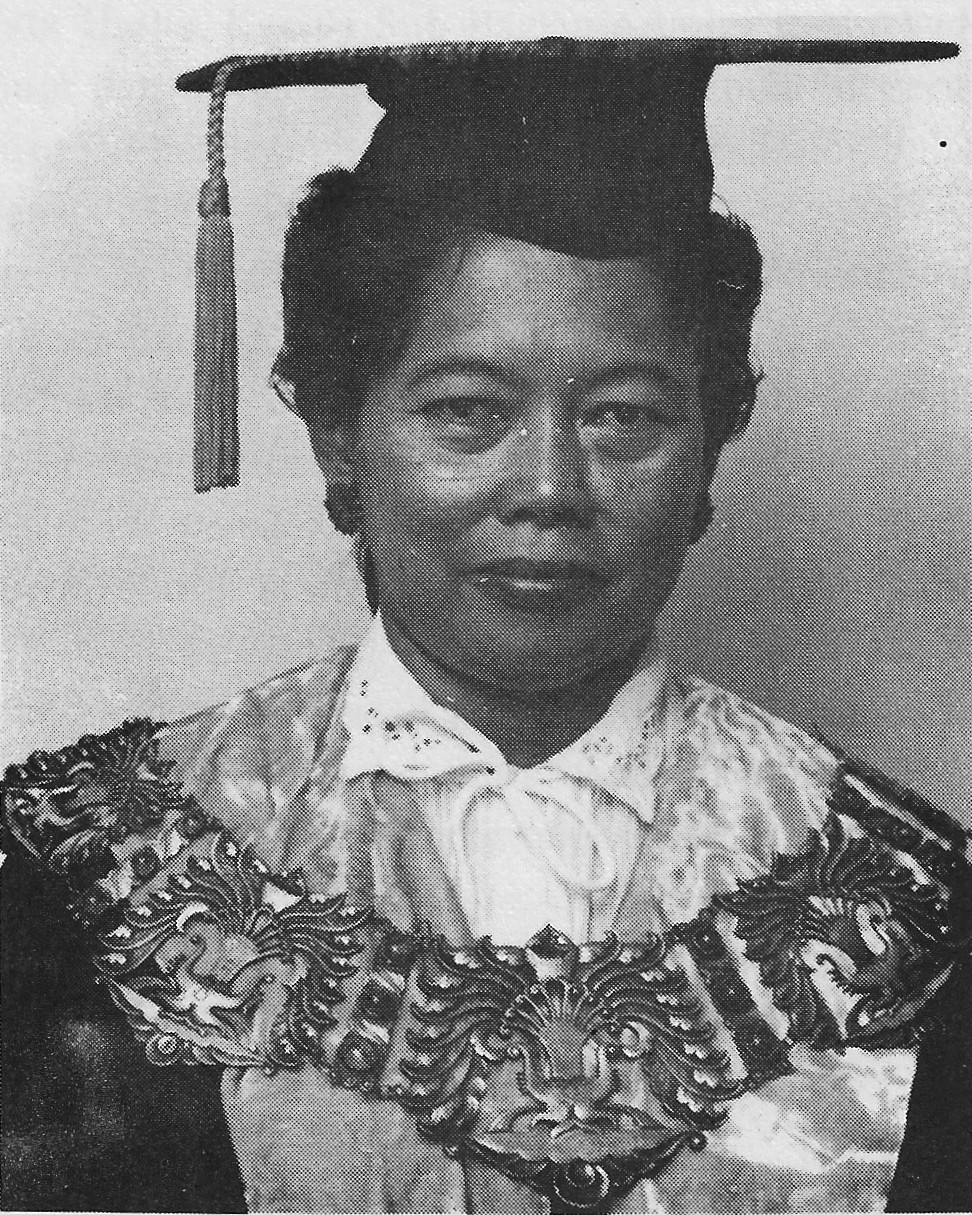

Dean of the Faculty of Psychology of the University of Indonesia
- In office 17 March 1984 – 11 September 1990
- Preceded by: Ashar Sunyoto Munandar
- Succeeded by: Yaumil Agoes Achir

Personal details
- Born: December 9, 1934 Batavia, Dutch East Indies
- Died: September 23, 2019 (aged 84)
- Spouse: Soewondo Djojosoebagio
- Education: University of Indonesia (Drs., Dr., Prof.)

Academic background
- Thesis: Effects of iron on cognition (1991)
- Doctoral advisor: Saparinah Sadli

Academic work
- Discipline: Psychology
- Sub-discipline: Psychotherapy

Soesmalijah Soewondo (9 December 1934 – 23 September 2019) was an Indonesian psychologist and academic administrator who served as the Dean of University of Indonesia's Faculty of Psychology from 1984 to 1990. Prior and after her appointment as dean, Soesmalijah was involved in administrative affairs, with her appointment as the administrative chief of the University of Indonesia and secretary of Indonesia's university entrance test committee.

== Early life and education ==
Soesmalijah was born on 9 December 1934 in Batavia as the daughter of Boestami Sjarif. His younger sister, Sjarmilah Sjarif, was Indonesia's first female oceanographer. Upon completing high school in 1952, she studied psychology at the University of Indonesia. On her fourth year, she became assistant professor in psychotherapy at the university's institute for applied psychology. She then became an assistant lecturer in child psychology on her eight-year, before completing her studies on 1 October 1964 with a bachelor's degree. During her career as a psychology lecturer, she attended a number of courses. She attended a course on group therapy held by the University of Malaya in 1971, a course on clinical psychology methods held by the Catholic University of Nijmegen in 1974, and several postgraduate courses in psychology by the University of Indonesia. In 1982, she received her specialization degree in psychotherapy.

Soesmalijah studied and researched nutrition at the University of Texas Health Science Center at Houston in 1985 and the University of California, Davis in 1987. On 6 March 1991, Soesmalijah received her doctorate with research on the effects of iron in human's body on cognition.

== Career ==
Soesmalijah began her career as an assistant professor in the psychology faculty in 1964, where she taught child, social psychology, and clinical psychology. In 1972, she became an expert advisor for counseling at the Bogor Institute of Agriculture. She was promoted to the academic rank of junior lecturer in 1967, senior lecturer in 1973, and chief lecturer in 1978. She also became a guest lecturer at the National University of Malaysia from 1967 to 1977. From 1974 to 1981, she became the deputy dean of the psychology faculty, responsible for administrative affairs.

In March 1980, Soesmalijah was nominated by the faculty's senate for the position of dean, alongside Ashar Sunyoto Munandar. The senate decided to vote for Soesmalijah with a 38–21 result. However, Ashar had already accepted the offer of the minister of education for the position, and the minister decided to overrule the results. The appointment was viewed as unjust by faculty members and student, causing mass resignation from the academic staffs of the faculty, including former acting rector of the university Slamet Iman Santoso and Soesmalijah herself. Fuad Hassan, who was then the director of the foreign ministry's research and development body, stated his reluctance to cooperate with Ashar.

From February 19 to 26, students from the faculty organized a general strike protesting the appointment. In order to avoid student protests, who had already occupied the rector's meeting office, Ashar was secretly installed by rector Mahar Mardjono at his office on 17 February 1981. Ashar then appointed J. Kandou—who described himself as having good relations with both Soesmalijah and Ashar—as deputy dean of the psychology faculty for administrative affairs.

In 1983, Soesmalijah was appointed as the chief of academic and student administration of the University of Indonesia. In her capacity, Soesmalijah was responsible for reviewing the implementation of the central government's five-year plan for the university. She held this position for about a year, as on 17 March 1984 she was installed as the dean of the faculty. She was installed for a second term as dean on 27 April 1987. During her tenure as dean, Soesmalijah also held a number of national offices, including as the general director of the counseling program for planned parenthood in 1985, chair of the Jakarta local committee of the university entrance exam. She was also involved in drafting the Broad Guidelines of State Policy in 1986 and overseeing the University of Indonesia's board for child development in 1988.

Soesmalijah was replaced from her position by Yaumil Agoes Achir on 11 September 1990. A year later, she was appointed as the director of the university's institute for applied psychology. On 21 April 1993, Soesmalijah was officially inaugurated as a full professor in psychology, with a speech on work stress. Soesmalijah argued that working women get stressed more often at the workplace in comparison to their men counterpart and urged more attention to be paid on such problems.

Soesmalijah continued to be involved in college admission exam administration after departing from the faculty. She became the executive secretary of the Indonesian university entrance test committee.

== Personal life ==
Soesmalijah was married to Soewondo Djojosoebagio, a professor of veterinary at the Bogor Institute of Agriculture. Soesmalijah died on 23 September 2019 and was interred at the Jeruk Purut public cemetery.
