= Azwar Anas =

Indonesian politician, bureaucrat and military officer (1931–2023)

Azwar Anas gelar Datuk Rajo Suleman
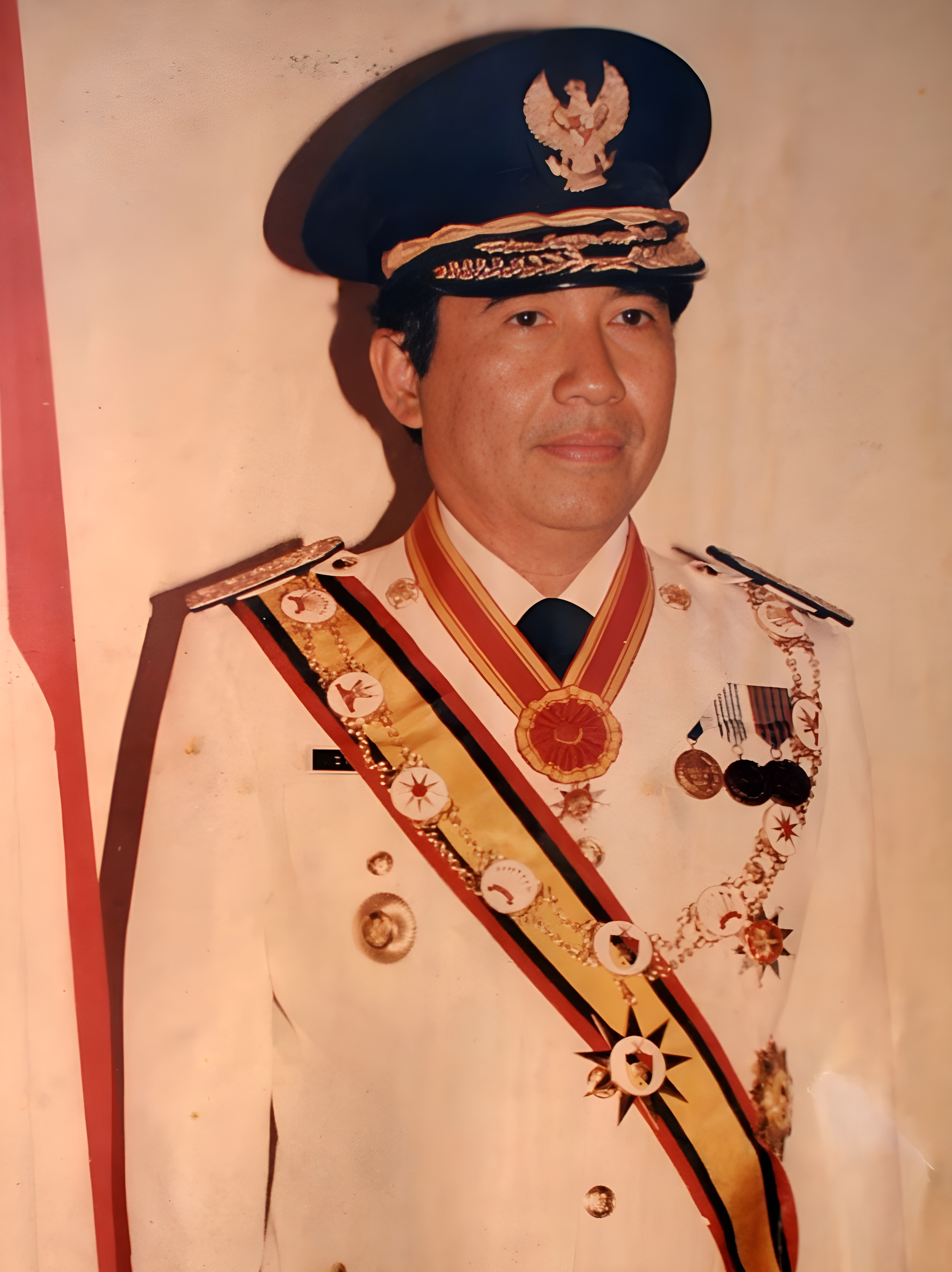
- Official portrait, c. 1982

8th Coordinating Minister for People's Welfare
- In office 17 March 1993 – 16 March 1998
- President: Suharto
- Preceded by: Soepardjo Rustam
- Succeeded by: Haryono Suyono

27th Minister of Transportation
- In office 23 March 1988 – 17 March 1993
- President: Suharto
- Preceded by: Rusmin Nuryadin
- Succeeded by: Haryanto Dhanutirto

4th Governor of West Sumatra
- In office 18 October 1977 – 30 October 1987
- Preceded by: Harun Zain
- Succeeded by: Hasan Basri Durin

Personal details
- Born: Azwar Anas; 2 August 1931 Padang, Dutch East Indies
- Died: 5 March 2023 (aged 91) Jakarta, Indonesia
- Party: Golkar (Golongan Karya)
- Spouse: Djusmeini
- Children: 5
- Parents: Anas Malik Sutan Masabumi (father); Rakena Anas (mother)
- Education: Bandung Institute of Technology; Syracuse University
- Occupation: Politician; bureaucrat; military officer

Azwar Anas gelar Datuk Rajo Suleman (2 August 1931 – 5 March 2023), more colloquially referred to as Pak Anas, was an Indonesian politician, bureaucrat, and military officer. A member of the Golkar political party, he served in a number of positions during President Suharto's New Order regime. During his career in government, he served as the coordinating minister for people's welfare, minister of transportation, and governor of the province of West Sumatra.

Born in Padang, in what was then the West Sumatra Residency, he graduated from the Bandung Institute of Technology in 1959, and attended Syracuse University that same year. He then joined the military, and underwent military training at the Reserve Officers School in Bogor. After graduating he was appointed by President Sukarno as a first lieutenant. During his time in the military, he became the director of Semen Padang.

In 1977, he was elected as the governor of West Sumatra, following the end of Harun Zain's term. He served as governor for two terms, from 1977 until 1987. As governor, he was known for his religiosity and was popular among many West Sumatrans. After leaving the office of governor, he continued to serve in government. In 1988, he was appointed minister of transportation and later he was appointed the General Chair of the Football Association of Indonesia (PSSI) in 1991. Two years later, Azwar was appointed coordinating minister for people's welfare, before eventually leaving government in 1998.

== Death ==
Azwar Anas died of respiratory illness in the CICU of Gatot Soebroto Army Hospital, Central Jakarta, on 5 March 2023, at 11.42 WIB at the age of 91 years after undergoing treatment for two months. His body was buried with a military ceremony the next day at Kalibata Heroes Cemetery led by Abdullah Mahmud Hendropriyono.

== Honours ==
=== National ===
- Indonesia
  - Star of Mahaputera, (2nd Class) (Indonesian: Bintang Mahaputera Adipradana) (1992)
  - Star of Mahaputera, (3rd Class) (Indonesian: Bintang Mahaputera Utama) (1986)

=== Foreign honours ===
- Austria
  - Grand Decoration of Honour in Silver with Star of the Decoration of Honour for Services to the Republic of Austria (1996)
- Malaysia
  - Negeri Sembilan
    - Principal Grand Knight of the Order of Loyalty to Negeri Sembilan (SUNS) – Dato' Seri Utama
