= Hasan Basri Durin =

Indonesian politician

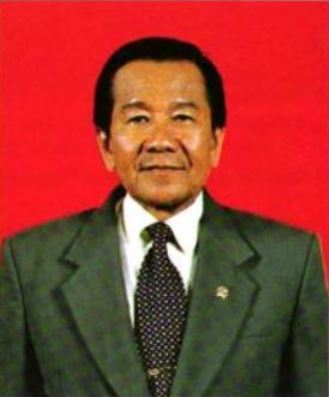
- Durin, State Minister of Agrarian Affairs (1998–99)

11th State Minister of Agrarian Affairs
- In office 23 May 1998 – 20 October 1999
- President: B. J. Habibie
- Preceded by: Ary Mardjono
- Succeeded by: Ferry Mursyidan Baldan (2014)

5th Governor of West Sumatra
- In office 30 October 1987 – 29 November 1997
- Vice Governor: Sjoerkani (1987–1992); Muchlis Ibrahim (1992–1997)
- Preceded by: Azwar Anas
- Succeeded by: Muchlis Ibrahim

10th Mayor of Padang
- In office 1971–1983
- Preceded by: Akhiroel Yahya
- Succeeded by: Syahrul Ujud

Mayor of Jambi City
- In office 1966–1968
- Preceded by: Soedarsono
- Succeeded by: Z. Muchtar Daeng Maguna

Personal details
- Born: 15 January 1935 Padang Panjang, Tanah Datar Regency, Dutch East Indies
- Died: 9 July 2016 (aged 81) Pancoran, South Jakarta, Jakarta, Indonesia
- Resting place: Kalibata Heroes' Cemetery
- Spouse: Zuraida Manan
- Children: Weno Aulia Durin
- Education: Gadjah Mada University

Hasan Basri Durin (15 January 1935 – 9 July 2016) was an Indonesian politician. He served as the Governor of West Sumatra for two terms from 1987 to 1997. In 1998, Indonesia President B. J. Habibie appointed Durin to his Development Reform Cabinet as State Minister of Agrarian Affairs.

Durin was born in Nagari Jaho, located in Padang Panjang, Tanah Datar Regency, West Sumatra, in the Dutch East Indies (present-day Indonesia) on 15 January 1935.

Durin served as the Mayor of Padang, the capital of West Sumatra, for two consecutive terms from 1971 until 1983. He was then appointed Governor of West Sumatra for two terms from October 1987 until November 1997.

In 1998, Durin was appointed Minister of Agrarian Affairs within the Development Reform Cabinet of President B. J. Habibie. He served in that post within the Habibie administration from 23 May 1998 to 20 October 1999.

Hasan Basri Durin died at a private hospital in Pancoran, South Jakarta, on 9 July 2016. He had been hospitalized since 21 March 2016. He was survived by his four children and eleven grandchildren.

Durin was buried in Kalibata Heroes' Cemetery in South Jakarta.
