= Seventh Development Cabinet =

1998 Indonesian government cabinet

Seventh Development Cabinet Kabinet Pembangunan VII
- 34th Cabinet of Indonesia
- 1998
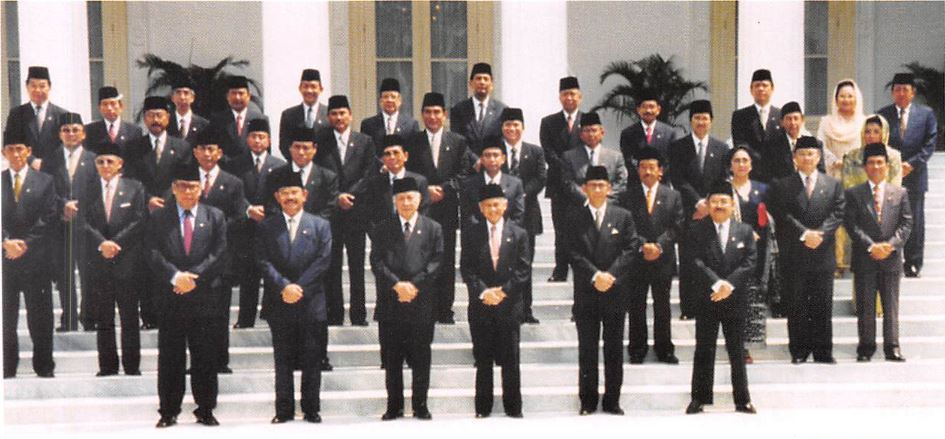
- President Suharto (front row, third from the left) with the newly-elected cabinet in front of the Istana Merdeka, 16 March 1998
- Date formed: 16 March 1998
- Date dissolved: 21 May 1998

People and organisations
- President: Suharto
- Vice President: Bacharuddin Jusuf Habibie
- No. of ministers: 34
- Member parties: Functional Groups; Armed Forces; United Development Party
- Status in legislature: Supermajority coalition 489 / 500

History
- Election: 1998 Indonesian presidential election
- Predecessor: Development VI Cabinet
- Successor: Development Reform Cabinet

The Seventh Development Cabinet (Indonesian: Kabinet Pembangunan VII) was the final cabinet which served under President Suharto and Vice President B. J. Habibie from 16 March 1998 to 21 May 1998. The term of this cabinet was supposed to end in March 2003, but due to student demonstrations and mass riots in 1998 due to the economic crisis that hit Indonesia, which led to Suharto's resignation from his position on 21 May 1998 and the appointment of Vice President B. J. Habibie as the new president, this cabinet became a resigned cabinet. As its replacement, the Indonesian government was continued by the Development Reform Cabinet .

The cabinet was formed in the midst of the Asian financial crisis and after Suharto was elected to a 7th term as president by the People's Consultative Assembly (MPR). It was a controversial cabinet where Suharto displayed his nepotism by appointing Siti Hardiyanti Rukmana as Minister of Social Affairs and gave Bob Hasan, a crony, the position of Minister of Industry and Trade. When things went out of control in May 1998, Suharto tried to reshuffle the cabinet, but the rejection of 14 ministers to be part of the reshuffled cabinet became one of the reasons why Suharto chose to resign from the presidency.

== The four cabinet aims ==
Whilst announcing the cabinet, Suharto also announced its aims.

- Development trilogy: Consisting of national stability, economic growth, and equity as the tried and tested basis of the policy of development.
- Self-reliance: Letting the nation go from reliance on other entities to self-confidence in the nation's own abilities, and having the capability to face the unpredictableness of globalization.
- National resilience: national resilience will grow out of self-reliance, togetherness, and familial spirit. This will consist of skill and strength of the Nation in facing challenges and threats.
- Unity and oneness: The two elements will strengthen national resilience and will ensure the continuity of livelihood as a nation, state, and people with the 1945 Constitution and Pancasila as its basis.

== President and vice president ==
President	Vice President
Suharto	B. J. Habibie

== Coordinating ministers ==
- Coordinating Minister of Politics and Security: Gen. (ret.) Feisal Tanjung
- Coordinating Minister of Economics, Finance, and Industry/Chairman of the National Development Planning Agency (BAPPENAS): Ginandjar Kartasasmita
- Coordinating Minister of People's Welfare and Abolition of Poverty/Chairman of Planned Families National Coordinating Body (BKKBN): Haryono Suyono
- Coordinating Minister of Development Supervision and State Apparatus Utilization: Hartarto Sastrosoenarto

== Departmental ministers ==
- Minister of Home Affairs: Gen. (ret.) Hartono
- Minister of Foreign Affairs: Ali Alatas
- Minister of Defense and Security/Commander of ABRI: Gen. Wiranto
- Minister of Justice: Muladi
- Minister of Information: Alwi Dahlan
- Minister of Finance: Fuad Bawazier
- Minister of Industry and Trade: Bob Hasan
- Minister of Mines and Energy: Kuntoro Mangkusubroto
- Minister of Forestry and Plantation: Sumahadi
- Minister of Agriculture: Sjarifuddin Baharsjah
- Minister of Transportation: Giri Suseno Hadi Hardjono
- Minister of Cooperatives and Small Business: Subiyakto Tjakrawerdaya
- Minister of Manpower: Theo L. Sambuaga
- Minister of Public Works: Rachmadi Bambang Sumadhijo
- Minister of Transmigration and Forest Settlement: Lt. Gen. (ret.) AM Hendropriyono
- Minister of Education and Culture: Wiranto Arismunandar
- Minister of Tourism, Arts, and Culture: Abdul Latief
- Minister of Health: Farid Anfasa Moeloek
- Minister of Religious Affairs: Quraish Shihab
- Minister of Social Affairs: Siti Hardiyanti Rukmana

== State ministers ==
- State Minister/State Secretary: Saadilah Mursyid
- State Minister of Research and Technology/Chairman of the Research and Implementation of Technology Board (BPPT): Rahardi Ramelan
- State Minister of Investment/Chairman of the Investment Coordinating Body (BKPM): Sanyoto Sastrowardoyo
- State Minister of Stateowned Enterprises: Tanri Abeng
- State Minister of Agrarian Affairs/Chairman of the National Land Body (BPN): Ary Mardjono
- State Minister of Housing: Akbar Tanjung
- State Minister of Environment/Chairman of the Relief Effort and Containment of Environmental Disasters (BAPPEDAL): Juwono Sudarsono
- State Minister of Foodstuffs, Horticulture, and Medicines: Haryanto Dhanutirto
- State Minister of Youth and Sports: Agung Laksono
- State Minister of Female Empowerment: Tutty Alawiyah

== Officials with ministerial rank ==
- Governor of Bank Indonesia: Syahril Sabirin
- Attorney General: Sudjono C. Atmanegara

== Changes ==
- 16 May 1998: Abdul Latief resigned from his position as Minister of Tourism, Arts, and Culture. He was never replaced.

== See also ==
- Suharto
