= Soni Harsono =

Indonesian engineer and bureaucrat

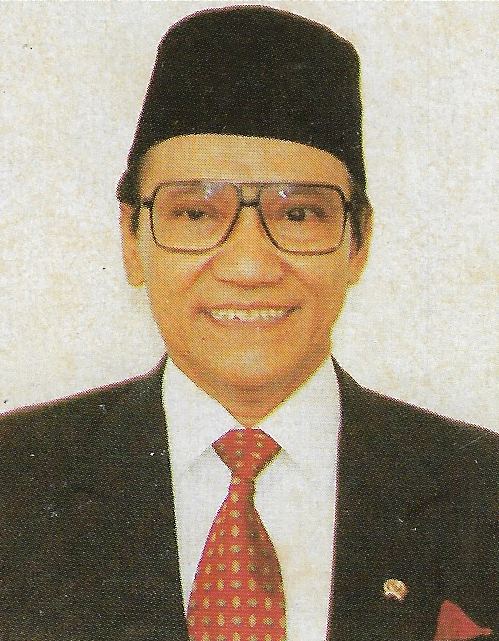

State Minister of Agrarian Affairs
- In office 19 March 1993 – 16 March 1998
- President: Suharto
- Preceded by: Rudolf Hermanses (as Minister of Agrarian Affairs)
- Succeeded by: Ary Mardjono

Head of the National Land Agency
- In office 21 November 1988 – 16 March 1998
- Preceded by: Sarwata (as Director General of Agrarian Affairs)
- Succeeded by: Ary Mardjono

Personal details
- Born: 1 May 1930 Majenang, Cilacap, Dutch East Indies
- Died: 22 December 2011 (aged 81) Jakarta, Indonesia
- Education: University of Hannover (1961)

Soni Harsono (1 May 1930 – 22 December 2011) was an Indonesian engineer and bureaucrat. He worked for decades in the Department of Industry and the Ministry of State Secretariat until his appointment as the Head of the National Land Agency in 1988. The post was elevated to a cabinet-level post in 1993 as the State Minister of Agrarian Affairs. He became minister until 1998.

== Early life ==
Soni was born on 1 May 1930 in Majenang, (Note: There are various versions of Soni Harsono's birth place and date. Indonesian Civil Service Corps (1995) in Pemantapan-Pengabdian KORPRI Dalam Menunjang Pembangunan Jangka Panjang Kedua: Munas Korpri IV, 1994 stated that Soni was born in Purwakarta in 1930. Ateng Winarno and Martin Sallis Say (1993) in Kabinet Pembangunan VI: Riwayat Para Menteri named Majenang as his birth place, with 1 May 1936 being his birth date. Yayasan Lestari Budaya (1997) in Hutan Rakyat, Hutan untuk Masa Depan has the same birth date as Winarno and Say, but put forward Magelang as his birth place) a small town located in the Cilacap Regency of Central Java. Upon finishing high school, Soni studied engineering at the Gadjah Mada University. He completed his studies in 1951 and went abroad to continue his engineering studies at the Delft University of Technology. He obtained a degree in engineering from the Delft University of Technology in 1954. Afterwards, Soni pursued further studies at the Leibniz University Hannover, where he obtained a degree in marine engineering in 1961.

== Career ==
Soni returned to Indonesia after finishing his education abroad. He began his work at the Department of Industry in 1961 and became the head of the department's shipbuilding project from 1964 until 1966. The project was later reorganized as the Directorate of Shipbuilding and Soni led the directorate for over a decade until 1980. He briefly worked in the presidential office before being appointed by State Secretary Sudharmono as his assistant for administrative affairs in 1981.

On 19 July 1988, Presiden Suharto of Indonesia issued a decree which transforms the Directorate General for Agrarian Affairs in the Department of Home Affairs to the National Land Agency, which was directly responsible to the president. Soni was appointed by Suharto as the agency's head and was installed for the position on 21 November 1988. Suharto's choice of appointing Soni, a shipbuilding engineer, was criticized by various parties, including parliament member Hussein Naro who pointed out Soni's lack of understanding in agrarian laws. In order to cope his lack of understanding in agrarian matters, Soni appointed Boedi Harsono, a professor in agrarian laws, as his chief advisor.

After five years heading the National Land Agency, on 19 March 1993 Suharto appointed Soni as the State Minister for Agrarian Affairs. Although Soni's new position gave him no additional responsibility, it provided him the authority to coordinate various state bodies on agrarian matters, such as the National Mapping Survey Coordinating Agency.

During his tenure as state minister, the National Land Academy was upgraded to the National Land College. The academy, which previously only held associate-degree program, could now held undergraduate studied programs under its new name. The change was officiated on the same day as Soni's inauguration as state minister. Soni ended his term as state minister and head of the National Land Agency on 16 March 1998.

== Later life ==
Soni retired from politics after the end of his ministerial tenure. He became an Islamic da'i and preached to various countries. In January 2006, while he was in Pakistan, Soni was summoned by the attorney general as a witness in a corruption case which involved the misappropriation of the Hilton Hotel at the Gelora Bung Karno Stadium. Soni returned to Indonesia later that month and stated that he has no knowledge about the case as the misappropriation occurred after he left office.

Soni died on the night of 22 December 2011 at the Pasar Rebo Hospital in Jakarta. He was buried a day later at the Kalibata Heroes' Cemetery.
