= Haryono Suyono =

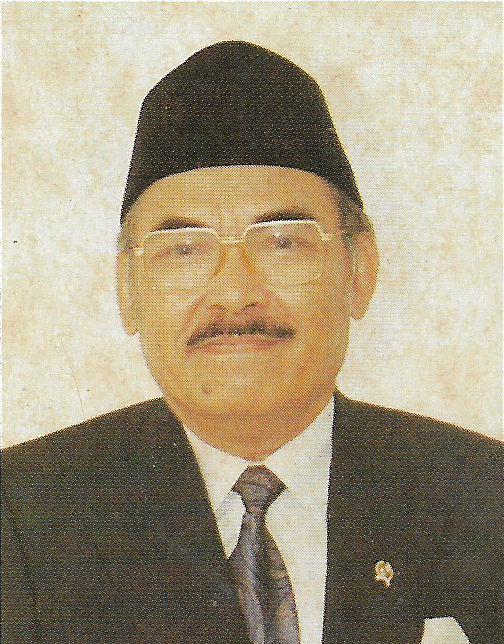
Suyono in 1993

Haryono Suyono (born 6 May 1938 in Pacitan, East Java, Indonesia) has served as head of the Indonesian National Family Planning Coordination Body (BKKBN) for 26 years. From 1998 to 1999, he served as Coordinating Minister for the Peoples' Welfare in the Indonesian Development Cabinet.

Suyono also wrote former President Soeharto's address to the UN assembly.

== Early life ==
Dr. Haryono Suyono was born in a small town in Java island, the most heavily populated of the major Indonesian islands. He is one of three sons born to a school teacher and a business woman. He has a PhD degree in demography, sociology and communication from University of Chicago in the US. Before his doctorate studies, he worked with a pilot FP project in Jakarta where his interest and commitment to population began. There were very few people with advanced degrees in population and demography in Indonesia at that time. Despite Haryono didn't finish his study, he also enrolled as a medical student at Gadjah Mada University.

== Career ==
While doing his doctorate degree in the late 1960s, Dr Haryono saw the opportunity to be a professional leader. He conducted workshops on population while at Chicago, and it was at one of these workshops where he came in contact with the Indonesian government family planning officials. He started his 30-year-plus tenure at BKKBN as a deputy director. While a deputy at BKKBN, he was involved in writing speeches for President Suharto which would inevitably include messages on family planning. He was head of BKKBN for 15 years, during which time the Indonesian program grew by leaps and bounds. He was Minister of Population and Minister Coordinator for Social Welfare, and also Chairman of LCOMP Executive Committee for two terms in the 1990s. He is Founder and Chairman of Yayasan Dana Sejahtera Mandiri, a foundation that promotes self-reliance and human development. He is also on the faculty of the School of Medicine at Airlangga University in Java, and host of radio programs on health and family.

Note: Decentralization of the Indonesian family planning program began in 2000, a process in which the transferred mandate of the program has a direction and implementation from a central level to the provinces and districts. The current role of BKKBN has since changed dramatically from the days when Dr Haryono was at the helm.
