= Adi Andojo Soetjipto =

Indonesian jurist and academic (1932–2022)

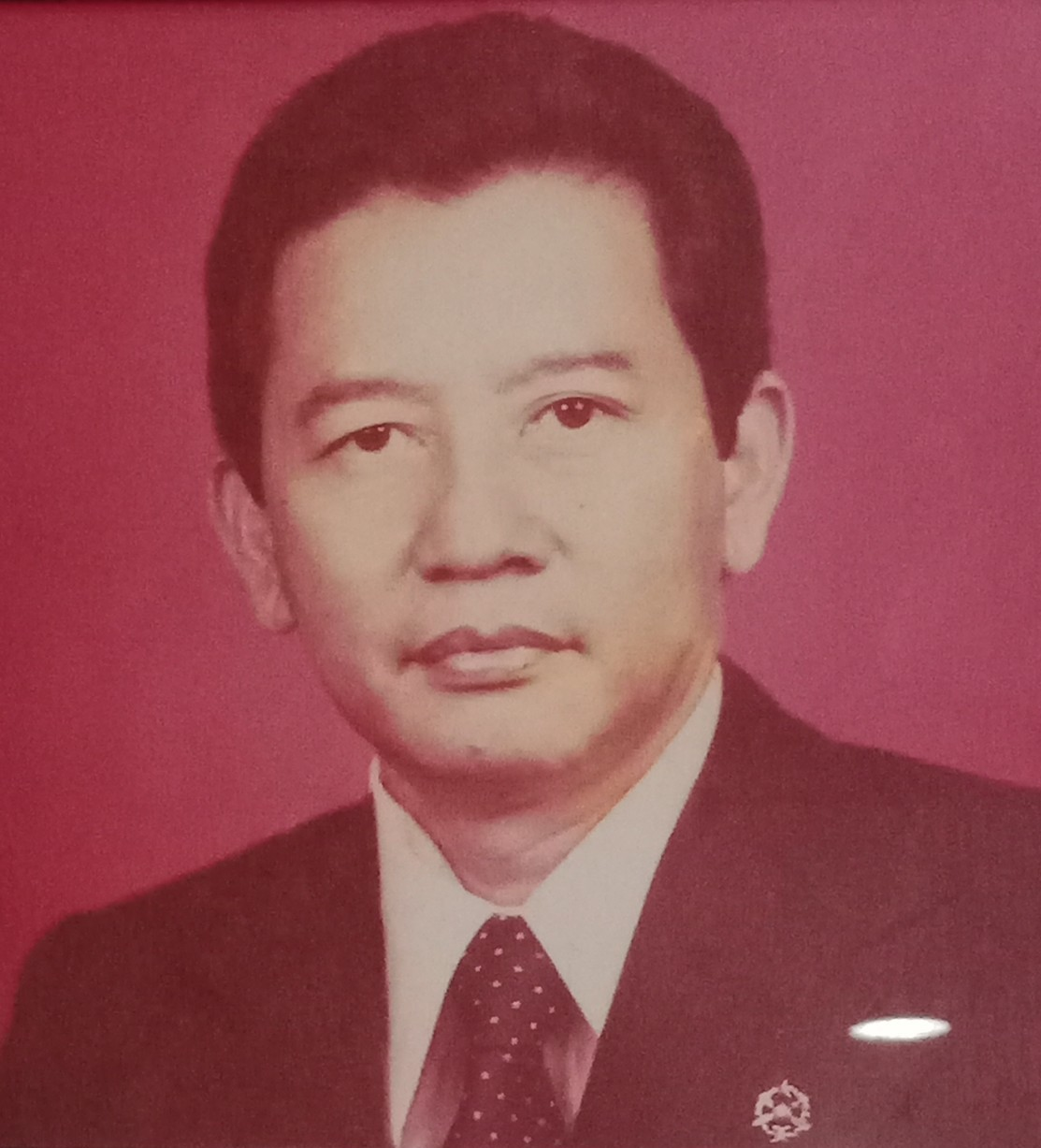

Associate Justice of the Supreme Court of Indonesia
- In office 19 February 1981 – 1 May 1997
- President: Suharto
- Chief Justice: Mujono; Ali Said; Purwoto Gandasubrata; Suryono; Sarwata

Chancellor of the Cenderawasih University
- In office 16 August 1968 – 13 June 1969
- Preceded by: R. Bintoro
- Succeeded by: August Marpaung

Personal details
- Born: 11 April 1932 Yogyakarta Sultanate, Dutch East Indies
- Died: 12 January 2022 (aged 89) Jakarta, Indonesia

Adi Andojo Soetjipto (11 April 1932 – 12 January 2022) was an Indonesian jurist and lecturer who served as an associate justice of the Supreme Court of Indonesia from 1981 until his retirement in 1997. Soetjipto was nominated twice for the position by the People's Representative Council in 1979 and 1980 and was installed in 1981. He was known for exposing bribery and collusion inside the Supreme Court and his criticism of the Supreme Court.

== Early life ==
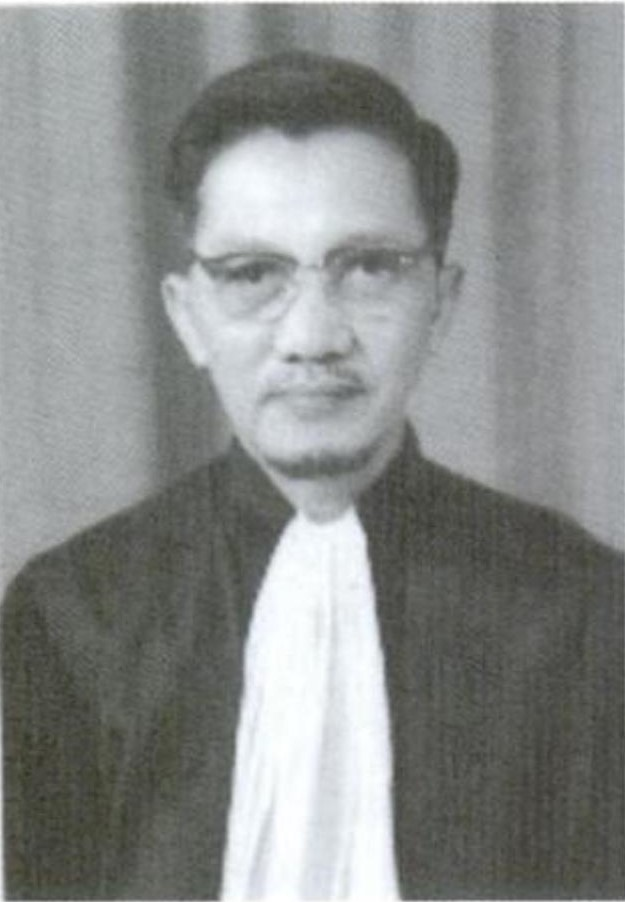
Soetjipto Wongsoatmodjo, Adi's father

Soetjipto was born in Yogyakarta on 11 April 1932. His father, Soetjipto Wongsoatmodjo, was a court clerk in the Yogyakarta Landraad (court for indigenous people), while his grandfather worked as assistant district chief in Baron. When Adi was a year old, his father was promoted to chief clerk in the Banyumas Landraad and managed to buy a car—a luxury item at that time—with his new wage.

At the age of seven, Soetjipto's parents enrolled him at the Sokanegara Elementary School in Purwakarta. After finishing his education there in 1944, Soetjipto moved to Yogyakarta, where he studied at a local state junior high school. He graduated in 1948 and continued his high school education in Surabaya. He studied law at the University of Indonesia and graduated with a meester in de rechten (Mr.) degree in 1958.

== Career ==
=== In Ponorogo and Bojonegoro ===
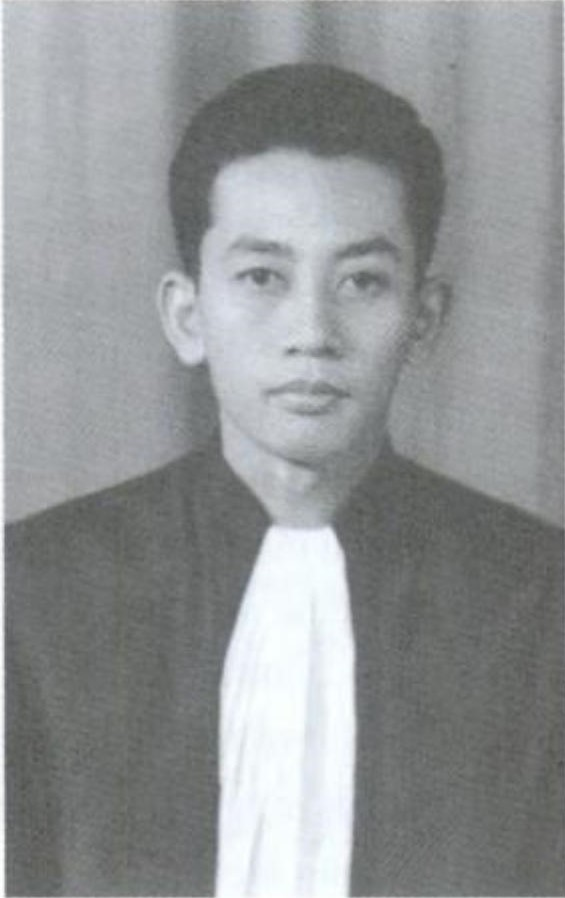
Adi as the Chief Judge of the Bojonegoro District Court

Soetjipto entered legal service immediately after graduating from university. He was stationed in Madiun as a judge in the Madiun District Court. Adi had his first encounter with bribery in Madiun, while handling the case of a Chinese man named Ie Djiang Ing in 1960. Ing attempted to give him an Omega watch and woolen clothes, but Adi refused Ing's offer. Adi also met his wife, Tuti Sudariati, while working there.

Two years after working in Madiun, Soetjipto was promoted to become the chief judge in the Bojonegoro District Court. Soetjipto replaced his own father who, at that time, had served as chief judge in the court for a considerable period of time. During his time in Bojonegoro, Adi was tasked with signing hundreds of renunciation of nationality letters without any financial compensation.

=== In West Irian and Java ===
West Irian, the newest province of Indonesia at that time, was established following the incorporation of the western half of New Guinea in Indonesia on 1 May 1963. As the province lacked jurists to operate judicial bodies there, the government opted to transfer jurists from other parts of the country. At his own request, Adi was sent to the province. He received his letter of appointment as the Chief Judge of the Sukarnapura District Court through a telegram on 31 August and left for Sukarnapura (now Jayapura)—the province's capital—on 9 September. He was promoted after four years in the district court and became the Chief Judge of the West Irian Provincial Court.

Aside from his job as a chief judge, Soetjipto also taught law at the Cenderawasih University, the province's only state university at that time. He was appointed the head of the university's presidium (chancellor) on 16 August 1968, replacing the local military commander R. Bintoro. Adi found out through his position that several students in the university were contrary to the idea of the incorporation of the region to Indonesia. He then gathered several of these students into a discussion at the Abepura Heroes Cemetery, while sending others to study at the Satya Wacana Christian University. He was replaced by August Marpaung as chancellor on 31 June 1969.

Following his service in West Irian, Soetjipto returned to Java to serve as the Deputy Chief Judge of the Central Java Provincial Court in May 1970. Four years later, he became the Chief Judge of the West Java Provincial Court. Adi led the court in resolving pending cases, which amounted to 2,753 civil cases and 589 criminal cases at that time. The objective was accomplished in August 1978.

== Supreme Court ==
=== Nomination and confirmation ===
Following the death of associate justice D. H. Lumbanradja in 1979, the chief justice nominated Soetjipto and two other provincial chief judges to the People's Representative Council for the position in March 1979. The People's Representative Council approved Adi but not the two provincial chief judges. The council then nominated him alongside six other candidates to the president on 7 June 1979. Adi was nominated for a second time on 26 September 1980 after the retirement of several associate justices. His second nomination was a success and Adi was confirmed as an associate justice through a presidential decree on 9 February 1981. He was installed on 18 February.

=== Early years ===
Soetjipto initially started working in the court as an associate justice. He was elevated to associate chief justice after a year of service. Adi had already made his name as associate chief justice for his opposition to corruption and for uncovering a "court mafia" in the mid-1980s. Adi also endorsed the appointment of Suryono, the chief judge of the North Sumatra Provincial Court, for associate justice, despite the reluctance of the supreme justice at time, Ali Said. Adi also requested Suryono to be put under his supervision. Although Suryono eventually became associate justice, Suryono eventually passed Adi for the supreme justice post in 1994. It was around this time that Suryono turned his back against Adi.

=== Muchtar Pakpahan and Marsinah case ===
Muchtar Pakpahan, a labor union leader, was arrested on charges of instigation after organising a labor strike in Medan which turned violent. Muchtar was sentenced to three years in prison by the North Sumatra Provincial Court, and his sentence was increased to four years after an appeal attempt. Meanwhile, the Marsinah case involved several people who were forced to testify having murdered labor activist Marsinah in 1993.

As the chief judge in these cases, Soetjipto decided to overturn the North Sumatra Provincial Court's decision and declaring Muchtar as innocent on 29 September 1995. Soetjipto argued that the provincial court has no evidence of Muchtar's attempts at instigation. In his verdict, Adi encouraged judges to "interpret laws based on changes in social political issues" and that the riots were "beyond the responsibility of the defendant (Muchtar Pakpahan)". His decision shocked the central government and was deemed controversial by the public. However, Soetjipto's decision was overturned by another supreme court decision in 1996 due to pressures from President Suharto, who felt threatened by the presence of Muchtar.

Similarly, Soetjipto also issued a controversial decision relating to the Marsinah case. He rejected the prosecutor's appeal in the case and ordered all of the witnesses to be released. Soetjipto stated that the crown witness method applied in the case was invalid. He further cited gross irregularities in the trial process and implicitly accused the military of torturing the witnesses in order to free themselves from the accusations.

=== Ram Gulumal case ===
Ram Gulumal, the owner of the Gandhi Memorial Foundation, was involved in a dispute over two schools that the foundation owned. Gulumal was accused of falsifying legal documents in order to gain the upper hand in the dispute and the case was brought to court. Despite initially being declared guilty and sentenced to jail by the district and provincial court, the case was annulled by the Supreme Court and Gulumal was freed of any charges.

A few days after the Supreme Court's action, Soetjipto leaked an internal memorandum to the public, confirming doubts of collusion between the supreme court and Gulumal's legal representative. The leaked memorandum caused public uproar, and Soetjipto immediately sent a letter to the district court—that had originally sentenced Gulumal to jail—to hold a judicial review of the case following the revelation. The public requested Soetjipto to completely investigate the case, while Soetjipto requested Suryono to investigate parties involved in the case.

Instead of receiving a positive response, Suryono stripped Soetjipto of his privileges as an associate chief justice. He was not allowed to conduct interviews, give statements to the public, attend Supreme Court leadership meetings, and work on cases. Adi was also threatened by an anonymous person who claimed to have hired an assassin to kill him if he continued to uncover collusion inside the Supreme Court. The court, however, followed Soetjipto's recommendation and sentenced Gulumal to twenty days in prison. The incident elevated Adi to the status of a popular hero.

=== Attempts to reprimand and retirement ===
Soetjipto went further to expose the Supreme Court system after the Ram Gulumal case. In March 1995, he issued a public statement alleging serious malpractice had occurred in the Supreme Court, while in April 1996, Andojo wrote to Attorney General of Indonesia Singgih that the Supreme Court had accepted bribes from wealthy businessmen in several cases. The Minister of Justice at that time, Oetojo Oesman, launched an investigation of the Supreme Court led by the Court itself, and the Court found no evidence of wrongdoing. Suryono then sent a letter signed by all of the associate chief justices to Suharto on 25 June 1996, requesting Suharto reprimand Soetjipto on disciplinary grounds. Suryono stated in the letter that "[Adi] have revealed the ugliness of the Supreme Court to outside parties, including to the foreign press".

The letter caused public outrage. Hundreds of sympathetic people sent letters offering moral support to Soetjipto and his family. Students in Central Java and Lampung went on a hunger strike in protest against the Supreme Court's hostility towards Adi, while a theatrical production was staged to depict Adi's courage and integrity. The Indonesian Lawyers Association proposed to replace Suryono with Adi, while the Supreme Advisory Council recommended Suharto not to reprimand Adi because it would "damage the image of the Supreme Court as a state institution in the field of justice". Suharto eventually refused to sign the recommendation letter by Suryono, and Adi was retired from the supreme court on 1 May 1997. The associate chief justice post was transferred from Adi to Yahya Harahap on 9 June.

== Later life and death ==
After his retirement from the Supreme Court, Soetjipto taught law at the University of Indonesia and the Trisakti University. During the May 1998 protests that toppled Suharto's presidency, he led Trisakti University students on their long march to the parliament building. He also became legal advisor to the families of students who were shot during the protests.

During the early days of post-Suharto era, Soetjipto became the deputy chairman of the Eleven Team, a team formed to verify political parties competing in the 1999 Indonesian legislative election. The team was dissolved following the commencement of the election and was replaced by the General Elections Commission, in which Adi also became a member. Aside from handling elections, he also chaired the Joint Team on Corruption Eradication, a short-lived body that was the predecessor to the Corruption Eradication Commission. He considered the team a failure, because it had no real powers in investigating corruption cases.

Soetjipto died in Jakarta on 12 January 2022, at the age of 89.
