= Eddy Hiariej =

Indonesian professor and writer (born 1973)

Edward Omar Sharif Hiariej
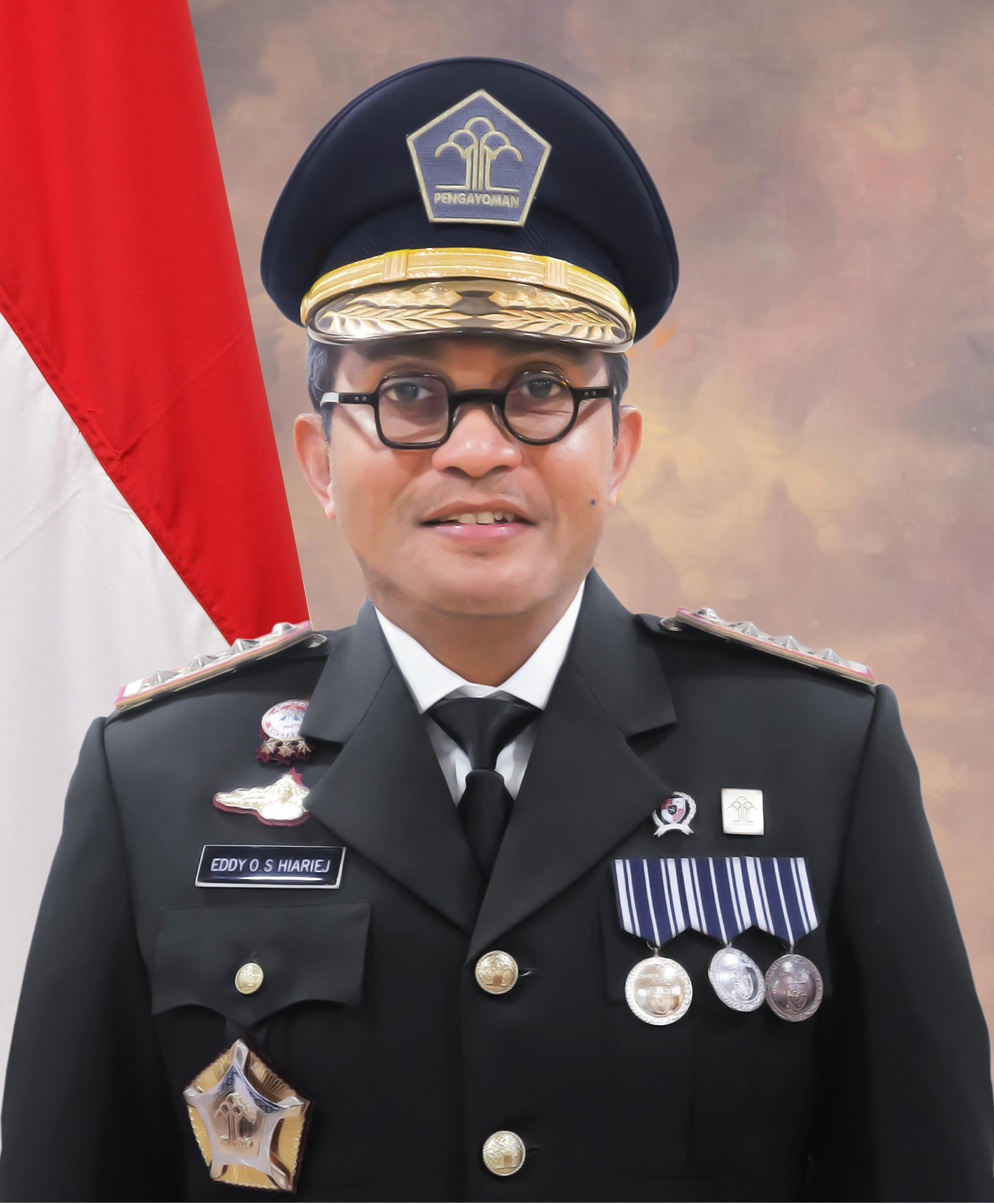

Deputy Minister of Law
- Incumbent
- Assumed office 21 October 2024
- President: Prabowo Subianto
- Preceded by: Office established
- Minister: Supratman Andi Agtas

Deputy Minister of Law and Human Rights
- In office 23 December 2020 – 7 December 2023
- President: Joko Widodo
- Minister: Yasonna Laoly
- Preceded by: Denny Indrayana
- Succeeded by: Vacant

Personal details
- Born: 10 April 1973 (age 53) Ambon, Maluku, Indonesia
- Spouse: Mega Hayfa Hiariej
- Children: 2
- Education: Gadjah Mada University
- Occupation: Professor; writer

Edward "Eddy" Omar Sharif Hiariej (born 10 April 1973) is an Indonesian professor and writer. He served as Deputy Minister of Law and Human Rights. He is criminal law lecturer at Faculty of Law at Gadjah Mada University.

== Early life ==
Hiariej was born on 10 April 1973 in Ambon, Maluku, as the seventh child. His sisters included Irma Hiariej (born 1967), and his brothers included Eric Hiariej, a lecturer. Hiarief graduated from high school in 1992 and enrolled at Faculty of Law at Gadjah Mada University in 1993, where he graduated in 1998. He continued to earned his master and Ph.D degrees from the same university in 2004 and 2009, respectively.

== Personal life ==
Hiariej is married to Hega Hayfa Hiariej and has two children. They had a son, Fayyadh Shaquille Xavier Hiariej (born 2010), and a daughter, Hayfa Lavelle Xaviera Hiariej.

== Career ==
=== Gadjah Mada University ===
Hiariej started his career as a lecturer at Faculty of Law at Gadjah Mada University in 1999. He became assistant vice chancellor for student affairs from 2002 until 2007 and continued as professor of criminal law in 2010 at age 37. He became an expert witness in the murder of Wayan Mirna Salihin case in 2016 and in Basuki Tjahaja Purnama's blasphemy case. His last witness experience was in the 2019 Presidential Election (Pilpres) dispute trial between Widodo-Amin and Subianto-Uno. In 2018, he made his film debut in Tengkorak, a film made by the vocational school of Gadjah Mada University.

=== Deputy Minister of Law and Human Rights ===
On 23 December 2020, he was appointed by President Jokowi as Deputy Minister of Law and Human Rights. On 4 December 2023, he resigned from his position after being declared a suspect in a graft case by the Corruption Eradication Commission in November 2023.

== Bibliography ==
- Asas Legalitas dan Penemuan Hukum dalam Hukum Pidana (2009)
- Pengantar Hukum Pidana Internasional (2009)
- Pengadilan Atas beberapa Kejahatan Serius Terhadap HAM (2010)
- Teori dan hukum Pembuktian (2012)
- Hukum Acara Pidana (2015)
- Prinsip-prinsip Hukum Pidana (2016)
