= Ismail Saleh =

Lt. Gen. Ismail Saleh LLC.
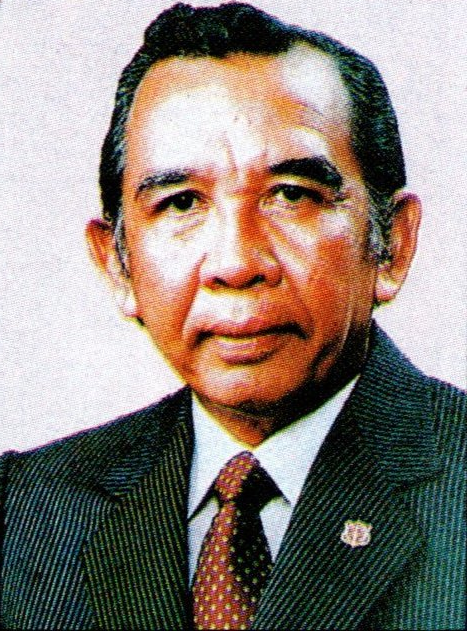
- Official Portrait
- President: Suharto

10th Attorney General of Indonesia
- In office 9 February 1981 – 19 March 1983
- President: Suharto
- Preceded by: Ali Said
- Succeeded by: Hari Suharto

18th Minister of Law and Human Rights
- In office 19 March 1983 – 17 March 1993
- Preceded by: Ali Said
- Succeeded by: Oetojo Oesman

Personal details
- Born: 7 November 1926 Pati, Dutch East Indies
- Died: 21 October 2008 (aged 81) Jakarta, Indonesia
- Resting place: Gunung Giri Family Cemetery, Cirebon
- Party: Golkar
- Spouse: Elly Djoharia
- Children: 3

Military service
- Allegiance: Indonesian Army
- Years of service: 1947–1967
- Rank: Lieutenant General

Lieutenant General Ismail Saleh (7 November 1926 – 21 October 2008) was Prosecutor General and later Minister of Justice of Indonesia.

== Biography ==
Saleh was born in Pati, Central Java on 7 November 1926. He graduated from a school for native Indonesians in 1941. Four years later, he graduated from the Middle School of Agriculture, and in 1950 he graduated from high school; during high school he enrolled in the army.

His first position in the army was in intelligence, serving with Third Division in Yogyakarta. In 1948, he transferred to the Ronggolawe Squad of Fifth Division in Pati and Wonosobo. After finishing his education, he switched to the legal division in 1950. Rising through the ranks, by 1964 he was mid-level officer in the investigative division.

In 1967 Saleh became active in politics, serving as Cabinet Presidium Secretary from 1967 to 1968. This was followed by posts as Deputy Cabinet Secretary for Government Administration in 1972, Cabinet Secretary in 1978, and Investment Coordinating Board Chairman from 1979 to 1981. From 1976 to 1979, he also led the Antara news agency.

On 9 February 1981, with the passing of Presidential Decision No. 32/M of 1981, Saleh replaced Ali Said as Prosecutor General of Indonesia; Said was made Minister of Justice. He was one of the "Three Punakawan" (a reference to the clown servants of heroes in wayang tradition) with the Chief Justice of the Supreme Court Mujono and Ali Said; the nickname was based on their perceived enthusiasm for upholding the law. Saleh himself was known to frequently hold surprise inspections of prosecutors' offices, later being quoted as saying "if we want society to be well-ordered, our law enforcement institutions must be likewise first." (Note: Original: "Bila kita mengharapkan ketertiban masyarakat, maka instansi penegak hukum harus tertib lebih dulu.")

Saleh then served as Minister of Justice from 19 March 1983 through 17 March 1993, in the Fourth and Fifth Development Cabinets. After leaving the government, he continued to write opinion pieces occasionally for national papers; his pieces were often written in retaliation to groups belittling former president Suharto.

In 2004, Saleh was diagnosed with a brain tumour, which was successfully treated. However, in June 2008 he suffered a relapse, and he died of cancer at Cipto Mangunkusumo Hospital on 21 October 2008. The viewing was held on 22 October in South Kemang, Jakarta, and attended by national figures such as President Susilo Bambang Yudhoyono, First Lady Ani Yudhoyono, Minister of Justice Andi Matalatta, and Prosecutor General Hendarman Supandji. Later that day, Saleh was given a military funeral in Gunung Giri Family Cemetery in Cirebon, West Java.

== Awards ==
Saleh was given numerous honours, from both the Indonesian government and foreign governments. Among his awards are the Bintang Gerilya, the Bintang Mahaputra Adi Pradana, the Bintang Kartika Eka Paksi, and the Bintang Jasa Pratama from Indonesia, Commander in the Order of the Crown from Belgium, Grand Cordon of the Order of the Sacred Treasure from Japan, and Order of Abdulaziz al Saud Level III from Saudi Arabia.

== Personal life ==
Saleh was married to Elly Djoharia. Together they had three children.

Saleh was known as a fan of bonsai and suiseki.
