= Sandjoto Pamungkas =

Indonesian diplomat (born 1932)

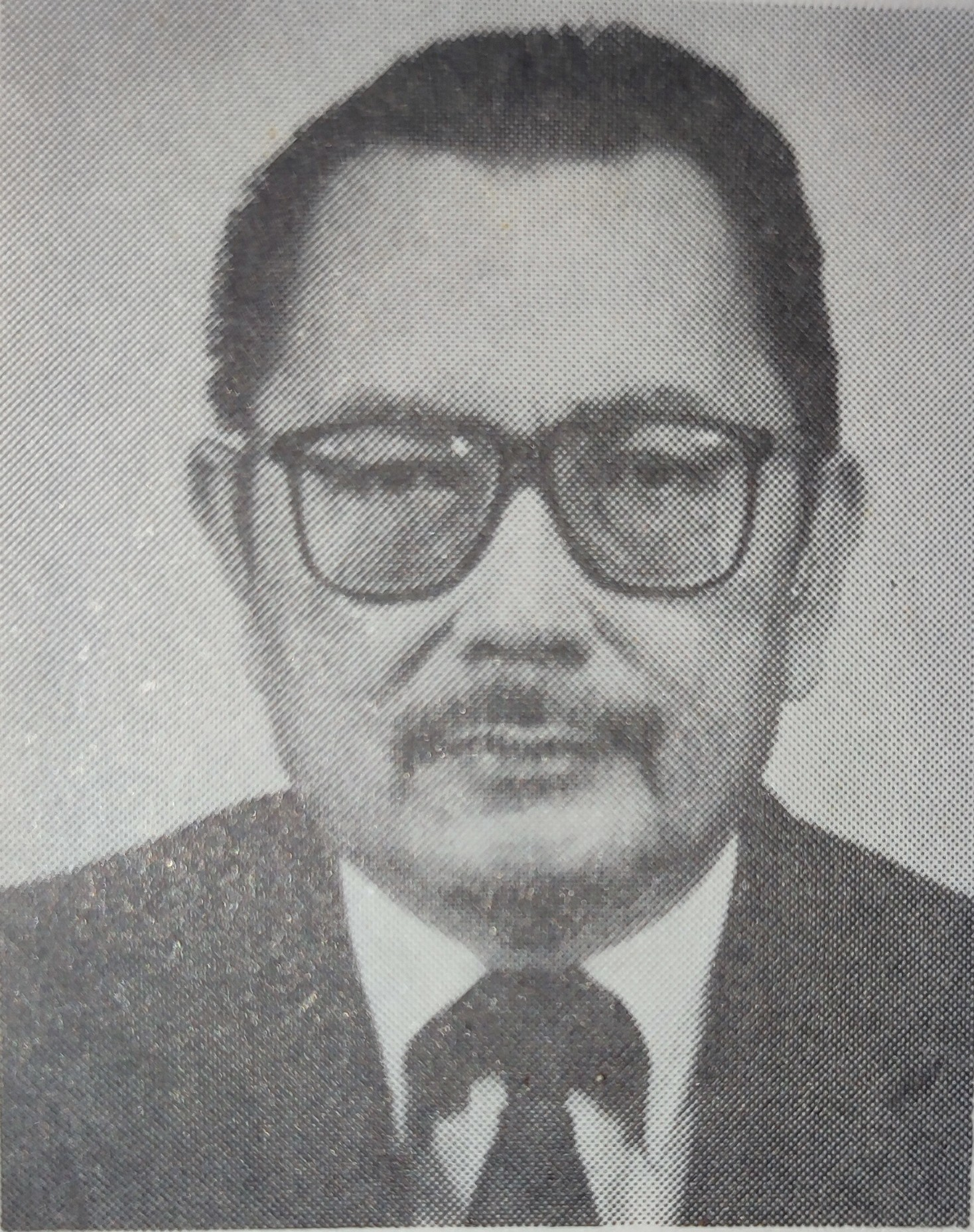

Ambassador of Indonesia to Yugoslavia and Greece
- In office 15 January 1992 – 1995 (Note: De facto until November 1992)
- Preceded by: Atwar Nurhadi
- Succeeded by: Slamet Budiadi (CDA)

Personal details
- Born: 10 November 1932 (age 93) Surakarta Sunanate, Dutch East Indies
- Children: 4
- Education: Academy of Foreign Economic Relations

Sandjoto Pamungkas (born 10 November 1932) is an Indonesian career diplomat who served as ambassador to Yugoslavia, with concurrent accreditation to Greece, from 1992 to 1995. He previously was the foreign department's director of international trade relations.

== Early life and education ==
Born in the Surakarta Sunanate on 10 November 1932, Sandjoto completed his diplomatic education at the Academy of Foreign Economic Relations in 1957, being the academy's last cohort before its closure. He later completed senior diplomatic education in 1974. Sandjoto, who is a Muslim, is married and has four children.

== Diplomatic career ==
Beginning his career with a posting at the embassy in Rangoon in 1961, Sandjoto started off as a commercial attaché before being promoted to third secretary a few years later. In 1969, having attained the rank of second secretary, he was sent to the Hague, where he received another promotion to first secretary while in assignment. By 1972, he was posted to the embassy in Cairo as counsellor, and after a tenure at the directorate of international technical cooperation, he was assigned to the embassy in Wellington with the rank of minister counsellor in 1977.

After a stint both home and abroad, on 12 September 1985 Sandjoto was installed as Indonesia's consul in Chicago by foreign minister Mochtar Kusumaatmadja. He received official exequatur for his consular role on 13 January 1986. Shortly following his official recognition, on 1 July of the same year he met with Chicago's mayor Harold Washington. Sandjoto left his position in December 1989, and afterwards was appointed as the foreign department's director of foreign trade relations.

On 15 January 1992, Sandjoto was installed as Indonesia's ambassador to the SFR (Socialist Federal Republic) of Yugoslavia, with concurrent accreditation to Greece. Although Sandjoto received his credentials on that day, Sandjoto did not present the letters as the country ceased to exist in its form in April that year, being succeeded by its rump state successor, the Federal Republic (FR) of Yugoslavia. In November of the same year, Sandjoto was recalled indefinitely from Yugoslavia as a protest of its inaction in regards to the Bosnian conflict. Indonesia de facto downgraded its bilateral relations with the Federal Republic of Yugoslavia to chargé-level relations, and send Slamet Budiadi as the embassy's chargé d'affaires shortly after his recall. Despite this, foreign department records continued referring Sandjoto as ambassador to the country. Sandjoto retained his de jure ambassadorship until 1995.
