= Attorney General Saeed =

Attorney General Saeed may refer to:

- Fathimath Dhiyana Saeed (born 1974), Attorney General of the Maldives
- Hassan Saeed (fl. 2000s), Attorney General of the Maldives

== See also ==
- Ali Said (Indonesia) (1927–1996), Attorney General of Indonesia
