= Supratman Andi Agtas =

Indonesian politician (born 1969)

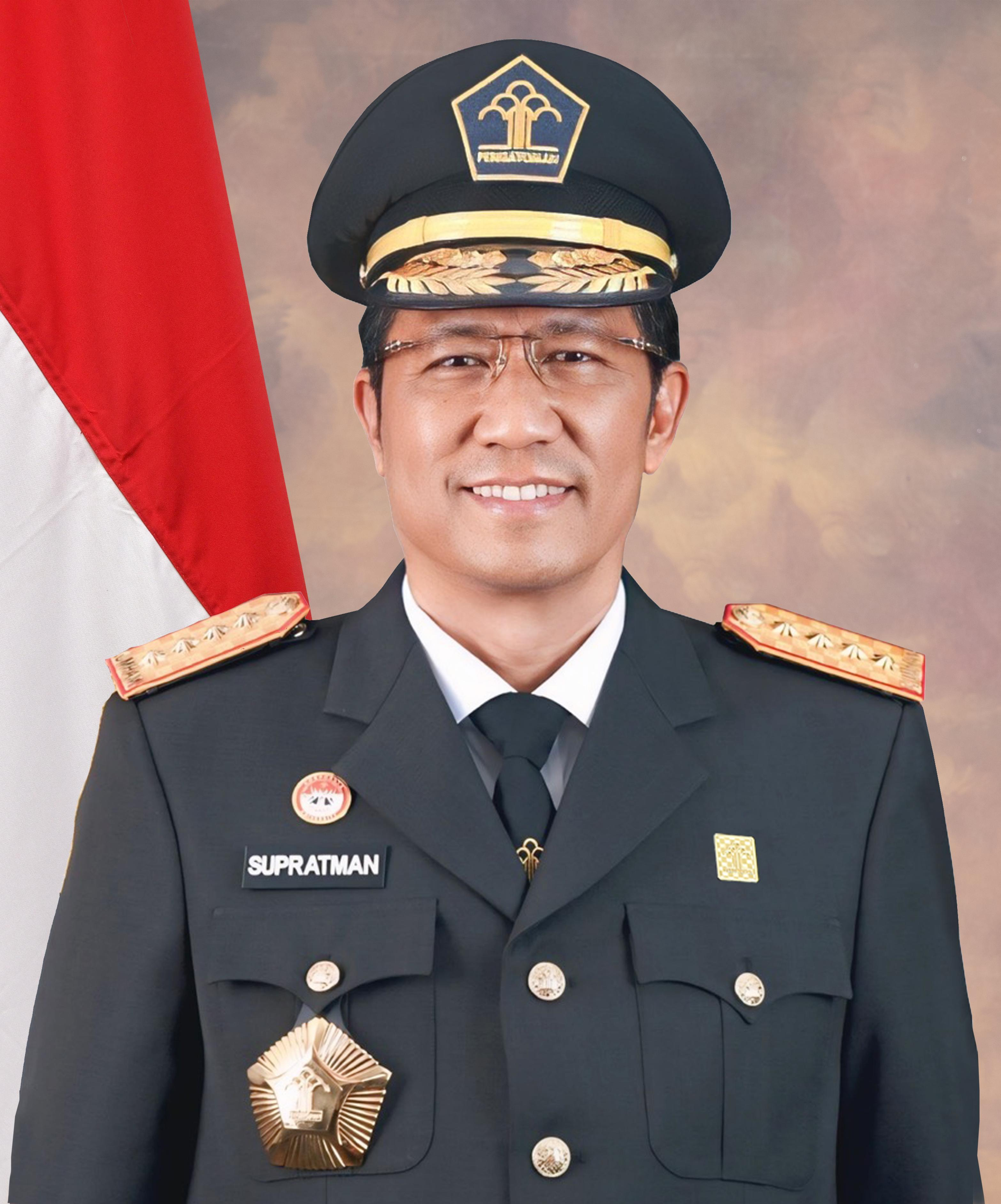

31st Minister of Law
- Incumbent
- Assumed office 21 October 2024
- President: Prabowo Subianto
- Deputy: Omar Hiariej
- Preceded by: himself as (Minister of Law and Human Rights)

31st Minister of Law and Human Rights
- In office 19 August 2024 – 20 October 2024
- President: Joko Widodo
- Preceded by: Yasonna Laoly
- Succeeded by: himself as (Minister of Law)

Personal details
- Born: Supratman Andi Agtas; 28 September 1969 (age 56) Soppeng, South Sulawesi
- Party: Gerindra Party
- Spouse: Idayanti Pandan
- Children: 2, including Abcandra Muhammad Akbar Supratman

Supratman Andi Agtas (born 28 September 1969) is an Indonesian politician of the Gerindra Party who has served as Minister of Law since 2024. From August to October 2024, he served as Minister of Law and Human Rights. He is the father of Abcandra Muhammad Akbar Supratman.

== Political career ==
In December 2024, Minister of Law Supratman Andi Agtas announced that 44,000 prisoners nationwide might get an amnesty on humanitarian grounds and to help relieve the country's overcrowded jails.
