= Abcandra Muhammad Akbar Supratman =

Indonesian politician (born 1998)

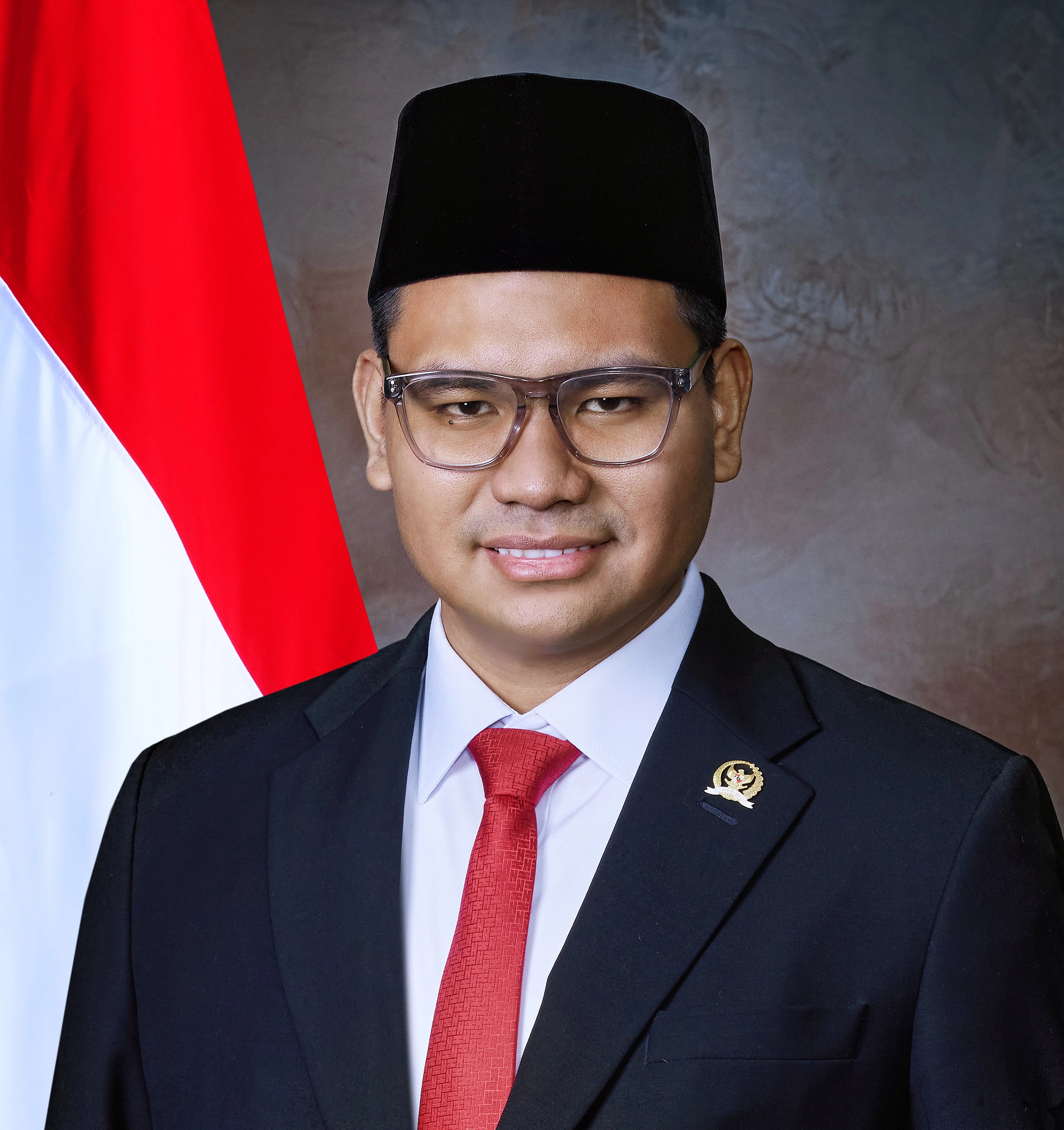
- Official portrait, 2024

Deputy Speaker of the People's Consultative Assembly
- Incumbent
- Assumed office 3 October 2024
- Preceded by: Fadel Muhammad
- Parliamentary group: Regional Representative Council

Senator for Central Sulawesi
- Incumbent
- Assumed office 1 October 2024
- Majority: 181.655 (2024)

Personal details
- Born: 1 October 1998 (age 27) Palu, Central Sulawesi, Indonesia
- Party: Independent
- Parents: Supratman Andi Agtas (father); Idayanti Pandan (mother)
- Education: Trisakti University (S.H.)

Abcandra Muhammad Akbar Supratman (born 1 October 1998) is an Indonesian politician. Since 2024, he has served as a deputy speaker of the People's Consultative Assembly, representing the Regional Representative Council. He is the son of Supratman Andi Agtas.
