= Suryono =

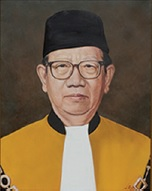
- Portrait of Soerjono

Chief Justice of the Supreme Court of Indonesia
- In office 1994–1996
- Nominated by: Suharto
- Preceded by: Purwoto Gandasubrata
- Succeeded by: Sarwata bin Kertotenoyo

Personal details
- Born: 22 October 1931 (age 94)
- Citizenship: Indonesian

Suryono, also spelled Soerjono, was the ninth Chief Justice of the Supreme Court of Indonesia. The reputation of the Supreme Court among legal scholars suffered under his tenure due to Suryono's tendency to reverse seemingly final decisions via what were derisively termed "magic memos," and he was generally regarded as a candidate who would maintain the Supreme Court's subordination to the executive branch. He overturned an administrative court ruling that had lifted a New Order-era ban on Tempo, a popular political commentary magazine.

Suryono fell into heavy conflict with former Supreme Court justice and Trisakti University Dean of Law, Adi Andojo. In April 1996, Andojo wrote to Attorney General of Indonesia Singgih that the Supreme Court had accepted bribes from wealthy businessmen in several cases; Suryono refused to back down when the letter was leaked to the press. Suryono denounced Andojo, who joined the Court in 1981 and made a career of exposing "court mafia," and encouraged President Suharto to dismiss him. Though a dismissal never occurred, then Minister of Justice Oetojo Oesman launched an investigation of the Supreme Court led by the Court itself; the Court found no evidence of wrongdoing. Though Suharto didn't accede to Suryono's demands for Andojo's dismissal, he did appoint Sarwata bin Kertotenoyo as Suryono's successor - only a few years after Kertotenoyo led the Supreme Court investigation that found no wrongdoing on its own part. Suryono's attack on Andojo made a national hero of the latter after a gag order issued by the former led to opposition protests by students and legal professionals.

With daily protests on the front steps of the Supreme Court, he made a habit of quietly exiting the building through the back door. Suryono himself took a dim view of the judiciary of Indonesia, stating after his retirement that up to half of all judges were corrupt.

Legal offices
Preceded by Purwoto Gandasubrata	Chief Justice of the Supreme Court of Indonesia; 1994–1996	Succeeded by Sarwata bin Kertotenoyo
