= Yasonna Laoly =

Indonesian politician

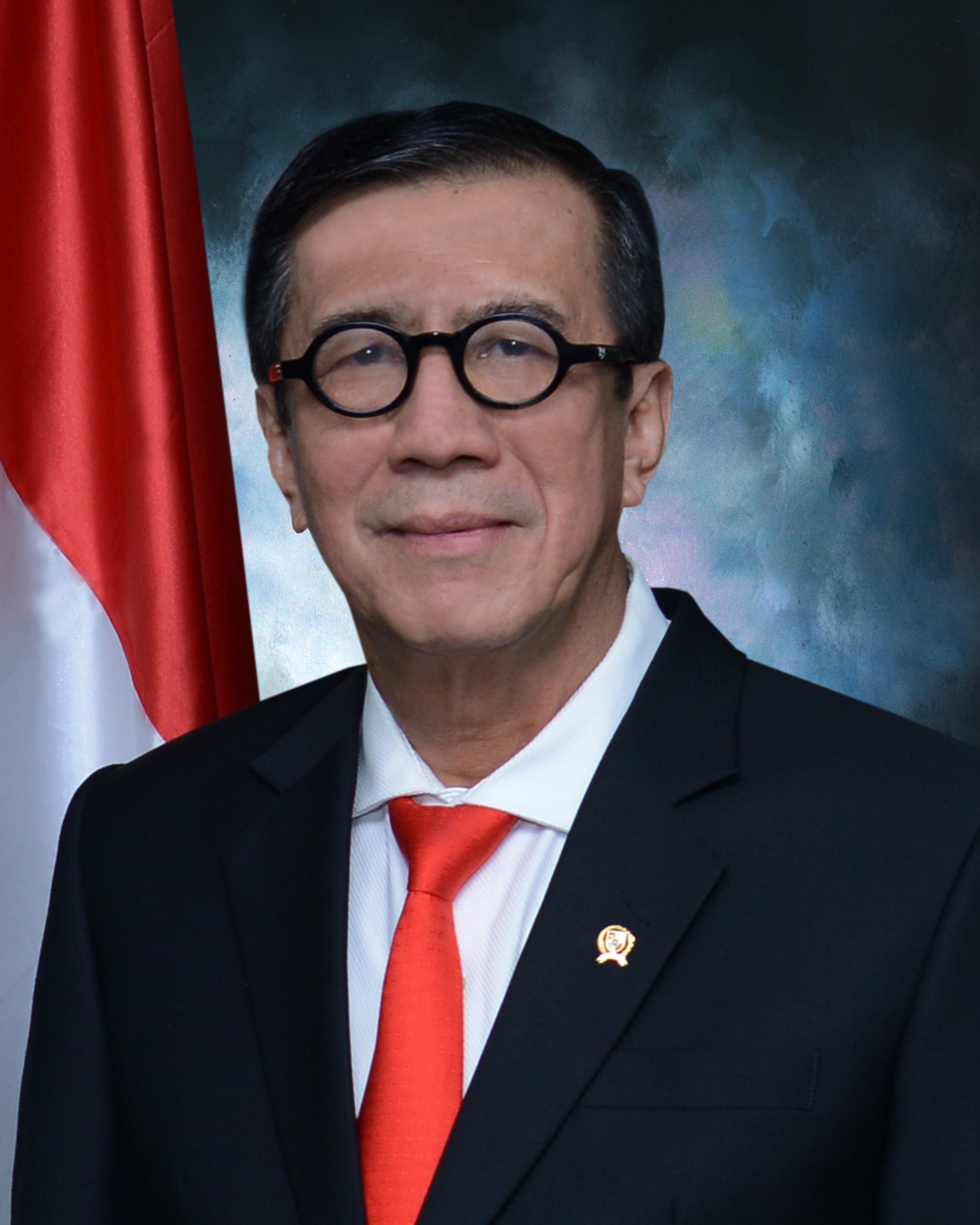
- Official portrait, 2019

30th Minister of Law and Human Rights
- In office 23 October 2019 – 19 August 2024
- President: Joko Widodo
- Preceded by: Tjahjo Kumolo (acting)
- Succeeded by: Supratman Andi Agtas
- In office 27 October 2014 – 1 October 2019
- President: Joko Widodo
- Preceded by: Amir Syamsuddin

Personal details
- Born: Yasonna Hamonangan Laoly; 27 May 1953 (age 73) Sorkam, Central Tapanuli Regency, North Sumatra, Indonesia
- Citizenship: Indonesian
- Party: Indonesian Democratic Party of Struggle
- Education: University of North Sumatra (S.H.); Virginia Commonwealth University (M.Sc.); North Carolina State University (Ph.D.)
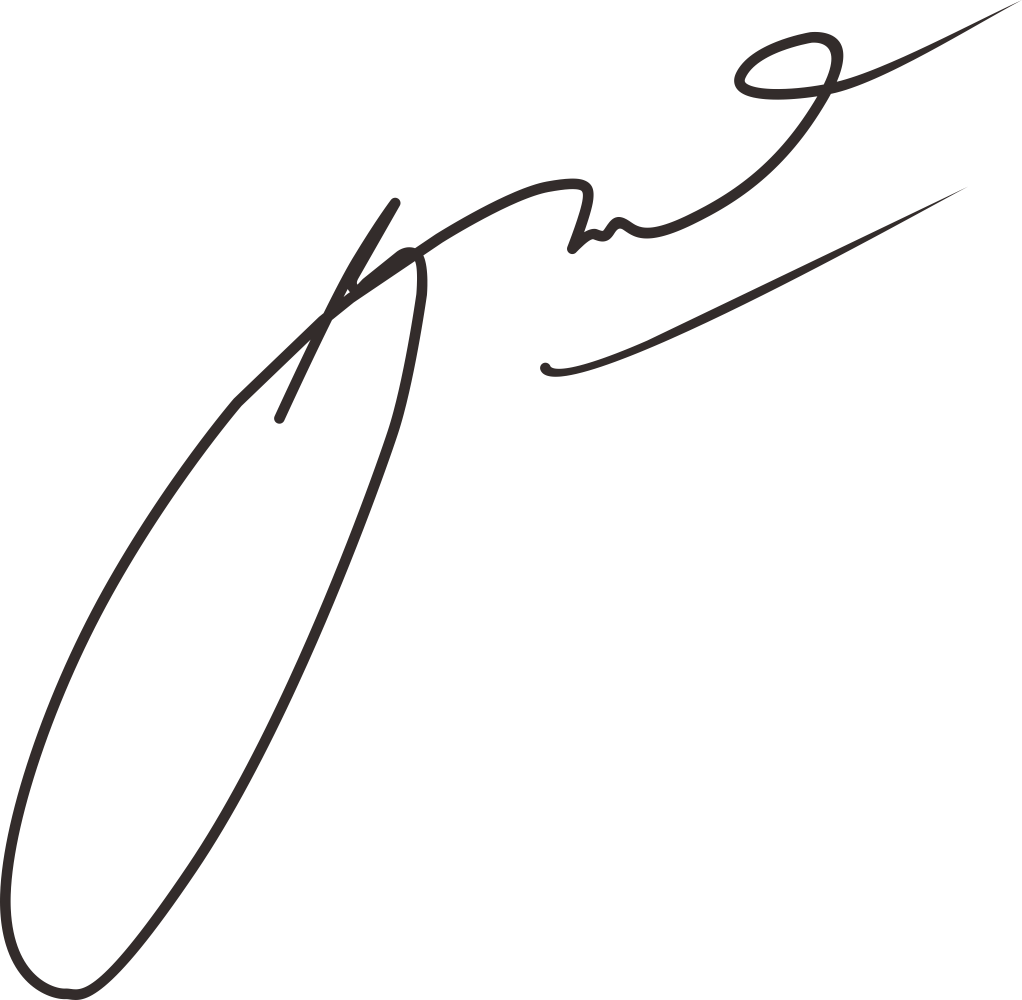
- Signature

Yasonna Hamonangan Laoly (born 27 May 1953) is the former Minister of Law and Human Rights of Indonesia, serving from 2019 to 2024. He was a member of the North Sumatra regional legislature from 1999 to 2003 and of the People's Consultative Assembly from 2004 to 2014. He is the first ethnic Nias to hold a cabinet position. He is one of the leaders on the central executive board of the Indonesian Democratic Party of Struggle.

== Personal life ==
Yasonna Laoly is of mixed Nias and Batak heritage. His father was Faogö’aro Laoly, a police officer and a native of the remote island of Nias. His father once traded frying oil from Medan to Nias due to the low salary of police officers.

Before studying law at the University of North Sumatra, Yasonna was planning to become a priest.

Yasonna is proud of his Nias heritage, and once wore a traditional Nias war dress to an Indonesian independence parade. His selection as a cabinet minister was greeted with enthusiasm by fellow ethnic Nias.

== Activism and political career ==
As a college student, Yasonna became active with the local chapter of the Indonesian Christian Students Union and was also a founder of the Nias Students Association.

After graduation, he worked as a lawyer and later joined HKBP Nommensen University as a lecturer in its newly established Faculty of Law. From that position, he earned a scholarship to study law abroad, first at Virginia Commonwealth University and later for his doctorate at North Carolina State University.

Following the fall of Suharto in 1998, Yasonna turned to politics, first as a member of the North Sumatra Provincial Assembly and later of the People's Representative Council representing the Indonesian Democratic Party of Struggle (PDI-P) Following the 2014 election of fellow PDI-P member Joko Widodo as president, Laoly was selected as a member of Widodo's Working Cabinet.

== As Minister of Law and Human Rights ==
Yasonna's selection was predicted, as he was considered part of the PDI-P's inner circle. As Minister of Law, his portfolio includes administration of Indonesia's penal and immigration institutions, authoring law proposals, and overseeing political organizations.

In this position, he helped President Joko Widodo draft the Government Law on Mass Organizations (known in Indonesia by its abbreviation, "Perppu Ormas"), which banned Hizbut Tahrir Indonesia (HTI), an organization that seeks to establish a caliphate in Indonesia. The law provoked several demonstrations by HTI's members and sympathizers, and litigation in the Constitutional Court of Indonesia.

In response to criticism of overcrowding and poor conditions in prisons, he said the problems were caused by a lack of personnel and high land prices, which hampered the construction of new prisons.

In 2017, Yasonna announced the creation of a National Harmony Council which would use non-judicial mechanisms to deal with past human rights abuses, prompting criticism this would restrict justice for victims and their families.

In 2019, Yasonna was criticized for publicly endorsing the Criminal Code bill, which would criminalize criticism of the president and vice president, and criminalize sex outside marriage. He was also criticized for his support for revisions to the Corruption Eradication Commission (KPK) Law, which was seen as undermining KPK's powers. Yasonna was a member of the government team that drafted the Criminal Code bill, and he represented the government in parliamentary hearings on the amended KPK Law. Following the criticism, Yasonna on 1 October 2019 resigned from his ministerial position, deciding to take a seat he had won in the House of Representatives in the April 2019 general election. However, on 23 October 2019, President Widodo re-appointed Yasonna as minister of justice and human rights for a second period, causing Yasonna to resign from the House of Representatives.

He has been criticized for recognizing pro-government factions in political parties riven by leadership disputes.

=== Obstruction of justice accusation ===
Indonesia Corruption Watch (ICW) in January 2020 called on President Joko Widodo to dismiss Yasonna, accusing him of obstruction of justice for giving false information on the whereabouts of PDI-P member Harun Masiku, who was declared a corruption suspect on 9 January. The KPK accused Harun of bribing General Elections Commission (KPU) commissioner Wahyu Setiawan, who had allegedly requested Rp900 million (US$66,000) in exchange for approving Harun to replace a deceased member of the House of Representatives. Wahyu was arrested in a sting operation on 8 January, but Harun remained at large. Yasonna on 16 January said Harun had left Indonesia on 6 January and was still abroad—even though media group Tempo reported that Harun had returned to Indonesia on 7 January. The Directorate General of Immigration, which is part of Yasonna's ministry, took 15 days to admit that Harun had indeed returned on 7 January. Yasonna denied he had deliberately misled the public on the whereabouts of his fellow PDI-P member, saying: "I am a religious person. I swear to god that it was an error." KPK said it would examine whether Yasonna had violated Article 21 of Corruption Law No.31/1999 in conjunction with Law No.20/2001 on the Obstruction of Justice. President Widodo responded to the scandal by calling on ministers to be more careful when giving statements and to cross-check their information. In response to calls by ICW for his resignation, Yasonna on 28 January 2020 fired Immigration Director General Ronny Sompie, blaming him for the misinformation.
