= Ministry of Law (Indonesia) =

Government ministry of Indonesia

- Kementerian Hukum

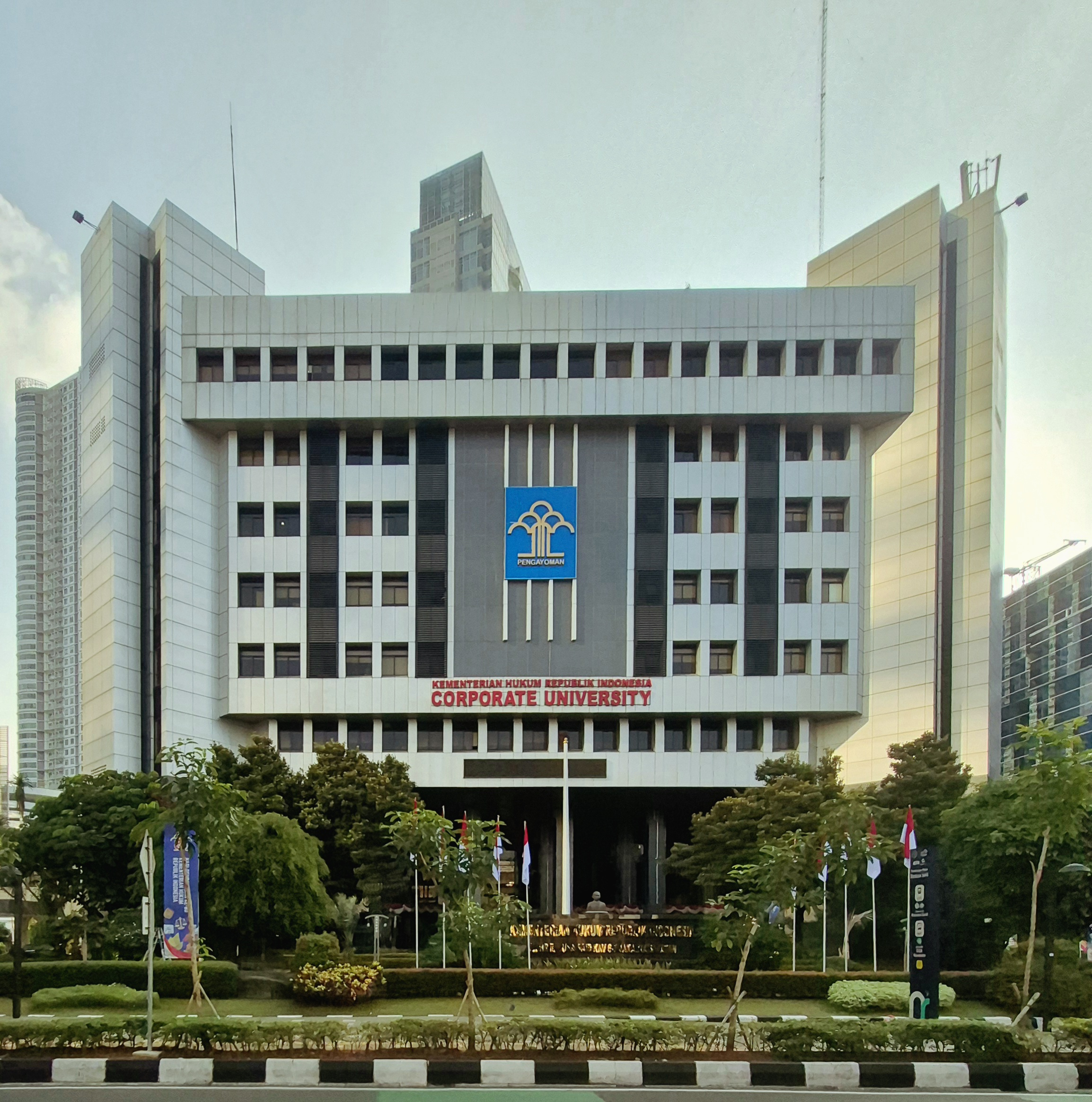
- Headquarters at Jalan H.R. Rasuna Said, Jakarta

Coordinating Ministry overview
- Formed: 19 August 1945; 21 October 2024 (current form)
- Preceding agencies: Directorate General I (Legal Affairs), Ministry of Law and Human Rights; Directorate General II (General Legal Administration), Ministry of Law and Human Rights; Directorate General V (Intellectual Property), Ministry of Law and Human Rights
- Jurisdiction: Government of Indonesia
- Headquarters: Jalan H.R. Rasuna Said Kav. 6-7 Jakarta Selatan 12940 Jakarta, Indonesia
- Motto: Pengayoman (Aegis)
- Ministers responsible: Supratman Andi Agtas, Minister for Law; Edward Omar Sharif Hiariej, Deputy Minister for Law
- Parent department: Coordinating Ministry for Legal, Human Rights, Immigration, and Correction
- Website: www.kemenkum.go.id

The Ministry of Law is an Indonesian ministry that administers and develops law and intellectual property in Indonesia. The ministry has been led by Supratman Andi Agtas since 21 October 2024.

== Organization ==
Based on Presidential Decree No. 155/2024, and as expanded by Ministry of Law Decree No. 1/2024 and 2/2024, the Ministry of Law is organized into the following:

- Office of the Minister for Law
- Office of the Deputy Minister for Law
- General Secretariat
  - Bureau of Planning and Organization
  - Bureau of Human Resources
  - Bureau of Finance
  - Bureau of State Properties
  - Bureau of Legal Affairs, Public Communication, and Partnerships
  - Bureau of General Affairs
  - Center(s) (attached to the General Secretariat)
    - Center for Data, Information, and Technology
- Board of Experts
  - Senior Expert to the Minister on Politics and Security
  - Senior Expert to the Minister on Economics and Social Affairs
  - Senior Expert to the Minister on Interinstitutional Relationship and Legal Reform Strengthening
- Directorate General for Legal Affairs (Directorate General I)
  - Directorate General I Secretariat
  - Directorate of Legal Planning
  - Directorate of Legal Design and Drafting
  - Directorate of Legal Harmonization I (Political, Legal, Human Rights, Government, Defense, Security, Communication and Digital Affairs)
  - Directorate of Legal Harmonization II (Religions, Health, Education, Research, Manpower, Social, Women Affairs, Child Protection, Culture, Youth, Sports, Tourism, Public Works, Housing, Transportation, Environment, and Forestry)
  - Directorate of Legal Harmonization III (Finance, State-owned Enterprises, National Planning and Development, Cooperatives and SMBEs, Energy and Mineral Resources, Agriculture, Food, Fishery and Maritime Affairs, Agrarian Affairs, Spatial Affairs, Industry, Trade, and Creative Economy)
  - Directorate of Facilitation of Regional and Head of Regional Government Regulation Legal Design and Drafting and Legal Fostering
  - Directorate of Legal Regulations Litigation and Non-litigation
- Directorate General for General Legal Administration (Directorate General II)
  - Directorate General II Secretariat
  - Directorate of Civil Law
  - Directorate of Criminal Law
  - Directorate of Constitutional Law
  - Directorate of Central Authority and International Law
  - Directorate of Businesses Entities
  - Directorate of Information and Technology
- Directorate General for Intellectual Property (Directorate General III)
  - Directorate General III Secretariat
  - Directorate of Copyright and Industrial Design
  - Directorate of Patents, Integrated Circuit Design, and Trade Secrets
  - Directorate of Trademark and Geographical Indication
  - Directorate of Partnerships, Empowerment, and Education
  - Directorate of Information and Technology
  - Directorate of Law Enforcement
- General Inspectorate
  - General Inspectorate Secretariat
  - Regional Inspectorate I
  - Regional Inspectorate II
  - Regional Inspectorate III
  - Regional Inspectorate IV
  - Regional Inspectorate V
- National Law Development Agency
  - National Law Development Agency Secretariat
  - Center for National Legal Monitoring, Review, and Development
  - Center for Legal Analysis and Evaluation
  - Center for Legal Literation Services and National Legal Documentation and Information Network
  - Center for Legal Cultivation and Assistance
- Strategic Agency for Legal Policies
  - Strategic Agency for Legal Policies Secretariat
  - Strategic Policies Center for Legal Formulation and Legal Development
  - Strategic Policies Center for Legal Services
  - Strategic Policies Center for Legal Administration
  - Center for Strategic Legal Evaluation and Legal Policies Publication
- Agency for Legal Human Resource Development
  - Agency for Legal Human Resource Development Secretariat
  - Center for Technical Training and Leadership Development
  - Center for Functionaries Development
  - Center for Competency Assessment
- Regional Offices
  - Aceh Regional Office for Law, Banda Aceh
  - North Sumatera Regional Office for Law, Medan
  - West Sumatera Regional Office for Law, Padang
  - Riau Regional Office for Law, Pekanbaru
  - Jambi Regional Office for Law, Jambi
  - South Sumatera Regional Office for Law, Palembang
  - Bangka Belitung Regional Office for Law, Pangkal Pinang
  - Bengkulu Regional Office for Law, Bengkulu
  - Lampung Regional Office for Law, Bandar Lampung
  - Jakarta Special Region Regional Office for Law, Jakarta
  - West Java Regional Office for Law, Bandung
  - Banten Regional Office for Law, Serang
  - Central Java Regional Office for Law, Semarang
  - Yogyakarta Regional Office for Law, Yogyakarta
  - East Java Regional Office for Law, Surabaya
  - West Kalimantan Regional Office for Law, Pontianak
  - Central Kalimantan Regional Office for Law, Palangkaraya
  - East Kalimantan Regional Office for Law, Samarinda (covering East Kalimantan and North Kalimantan, including Nusantara)
  - South Kalimantan Regional Office for Law, Banjarmasin
  - Bali Regional Office for Law, Denpasar
  - West Nusa Tenggara Regional Office for Law, Mataram
  - East Nusa Tenggara Regional Office for Law, Kupang
  - South Sulawesi Regional Office for Law, Makassar
  - Central Sulawesi Regional Office for Law, Palu
  - North Sulawesi Regional Office for Law, Manado
  - Gorontalo Regional Office for Law, Gorontalo
  - Southeast Sulawesi Regional Office for Law, Kendari
  - Maluku Regional Office for Law, Ambon
  - North Maluku Regional Office for Law, Ternate
  - Papua Regional Office for Law, Jayapura (covering Papua, South Papua, Central Papua, and Highlands Papua)
  - West Papua Regional Office for Law, Manokwari (covering West Papua and South West Papua)
  - Riau Islands Regional Office for Law, Tanjung Pinang
  - West Sulawesi Regional Office for Law, Mamuju
