= R. Bintoro =

Indonesian military officer (1924–1986)

Major General Raden Bintoro
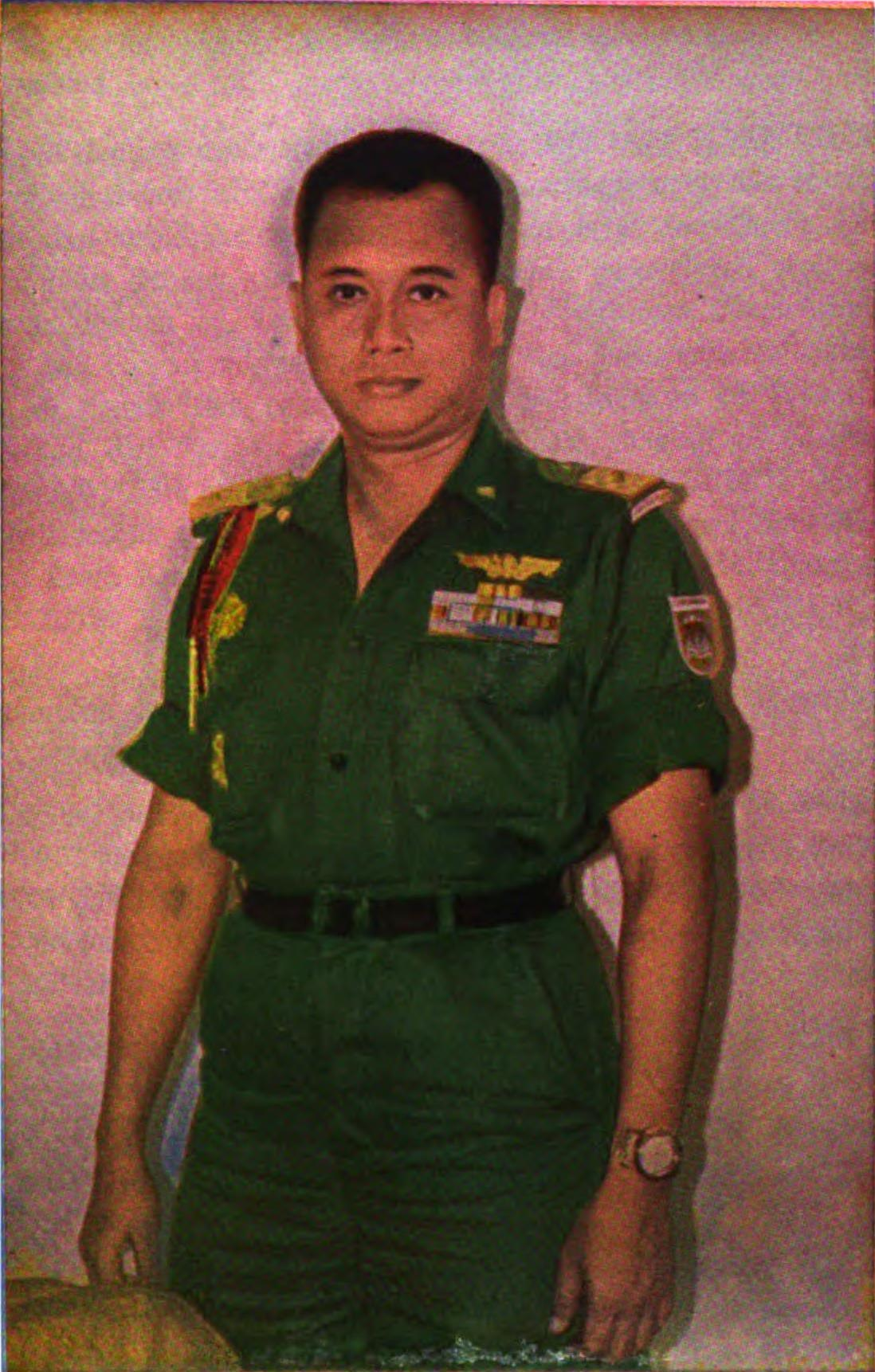
- Born: 23 December 1924
- Died: 13 June 1986 (aged 61)
- Military career
- Allegiance: Indonesia
- Branch: Army
- Service years: 1943–1978
- Rank: Major General
- Service number: 17597
- Unit: Infantry
- Conflicts: Indonesian National Revolution; Operation Kraai; Papua conflict; Operation Bharatayudha (Papua)

Major General Raden Bintoro (23 December 1924 – 13 June 1986) was an Indonesian military officer. His last position in the army was as the Deputy Commander of the Fourth Regional Command.

== Military career ==
Bintoro was born on 23 December 1924. He began his military career after attending the Renseitai (officer training unit) during the Japanese occupation of the Dutch East Indies. He was then put in command of a Defenders of the Homeland — a paramilitary volunteer unit — platoon in Kedu after finishing education from Renseitai.

After the Indonesian independence in 1945, Bintoro entered the newly formed Indonesian Army and became the commander of the 296th Military Subdistrict, which covers the Parakan, Temanggung, and Candiroto District. He held the command until Operation Kraai in December 1948.

Bintoro was appointed as the chief of staff of the Merdeka Military Region in the late 1950s. He became the acting commander of the military region after the previous commander, Sunarijadi, left his post. After holding the chief of staff post for a while, Bintoro was instructed to pursue further military education at the Indonesian Army Command and General Staff College. He graduated from the college in 1963.

Bintoro became the commander of the Cenderawasih (Papua) Military Region on 23 March 1966, replacing Kartidjo. He later launched a competition for the tune of the military region's march, with Bintoro himself as the author of the lyrics. A submission made by musician Nuskan Sjarif was named as the competition's winner and the march was made official on 17 August 1966.

Two month after he was made as the commander, Bintoro replaced his chief of staff with a new one. He also conducted several reorganizations military districts and a battalion. A year later, on 29 March 1967, he launched an operation codenamed Bharatayudha, which was aimed to crush rebel groups under the leadership of Ferry Awom and Lodewijk Mandatjan and to safeguard the Act of Free Choice process.

The operation involved troops from West Java's 314th Infantry Battalion, South Sulawesi's 700th Airborne Battalion, 935th Mobile Brigade Corps Battalion, several platoons from the Indonesian Marine Corps, Paskhas, Rapid Force Command, and Special Forces Command. The operation accomplished its original goal, with most of the rebel groups being split into smaller and less powerful groups. Around 73 rebel soldiers were killed and 60 were captured during this operation, while 3,539 soldiers surrendered. However, the operation shocked and traumatized most Papuans, as they never thought Indonesians would launch an open warfare against these groups. He left his post not long after the operation commenced on 25 August 1968.

After leaving his post, Bintoro was appointed as the Inspector for Moral and Mental Development. He did not held this position for long, as he was instructed to attend a regular course in the National Resilience Institute. He attended the course from 13 July 1970 until 6 January 1971. He then became the Deputy Commander of the Fourth Regional Command — which covered Maluku and Papua — on 24 August 1976 and left the post in February 1978. He retired from the military in the same year.

Bintoro died on 13 June 1986. He was buried at the Kalibata Heroes' Cemetery.

== Bibliography ==
- Ismail, A; Rapanoi, Supardi; Said B. A., Sjamsuar; Hutasuhut, H. (1971), Irian Barat dari Masa ke Masa, Jakarta: Military History of the 17th Military Regional Command/Tjenderawasih
