= Purwoto Gandasubrata =

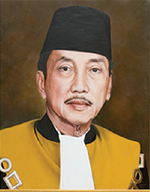
- Portrait of Purwoto S. Ganda Subrata

Chief Justice of the Supreme Court of Indonesia
- In office 1992–1994
- Nominated by: Suharto
- Preceded by: Ali Said
- Succeeded by: Suryono

Personal details
- Born: 11 October 1929 Purwokerto, Central Java, Indonesia
- Died: 4 May 2005 (aged 75)
- Occupation: judge

Purwoto Gandasubrata was the eighth Chief Justice of the Supreme Court of Indonesia. Alongside the Ministry of Justice officials in the Sixth Development Cabinet, Gandasubrata was a part of a general return of civilian officials to the judiciary of Indonesia in the early 1990s after a period of former military officials dominating the branch from the late 1970s. Gandasubrata had initially served as the chief of the district court of Semarang, as well as the chairman of the regional branch of the Indonesian Judges Association.

Gandasubrata was the first Chief Justice appointed from the professional judiciary since Umar Seno Aji. During his two years in the position, much of his efforts were spent on attempts to increase the autonomy, power, and status of the judicial branch of government. On the occasion of his retirement in 1994, Gandasubrata announced a 100% salary increase for Indonesian judges in a move that was seen as a parting gift. The increase was later offset by a 45% reduction in benefits enacted by the government.

Legal offices
Preceded by Ali Said	Chief Justice of the Supreme Court of Indonesia; 1992–1994	Succeeded by Suryono
