= Mochtar Kusumaatmadja =

Indonesian diplomat and politician (1929–2021)

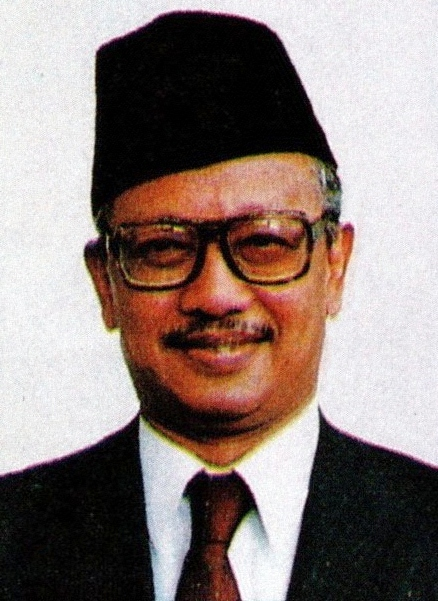

12th Minister of Foreign Affairs
- In office 29 March 1978 – 21 March 1988
- President: Suharto
- Preceded by: Adam Malik
- Succeeded by: Ali Alatas

16th Minister of Justice
- In office 22 January 1974 – 29 March 1978
- President: Suharto
- Preceded by: Umar Seno Aji
- Succeeded by: Mujono

Personal details
- Born: 17 February 1929 Batavia, Dutch East Indies
- Died: 6 June 2021 (aged 92) Jakarta, Indonesia
- Resting place: Kalibata Heroes' Cemetery
- Spouse: Siti Hadidjah
- Children: Armida Alisjahbana
- Education: Yale University, University of Chicago
- Profession: Diplomat; politician

Mochtar Kusumaatmadja (17 February 1929 – 6 June 2021) was an Indonesian diplomat and politician. He was Indonesia's minister of justice from 1974 until 1978 and foreign minister from 1978 until 1988.

== Early life and education ==
Kusumaatmadja was born on 17 February 1929 in Batavia (now Jakarta). Kusumaatmadja joined the Union of Youth Students in Indonesia after independence in 1945 and fought in the Indonesian National Revolution as a member of the Student Army and the People's Security Army. After the revolution ended, Kusumaatmadja attended the law faculty of the University of Indonesia and pursued a double degree program from the Yale Law School. He graduated in 1955 with an undergraduate degree from the University of Indonesia and a Master of Laws degree from Yale Law School. He attended further university education at Padjadjaran University and obtained a doctorate in 1962.

According to Ronald and June Katz, Kusumaatmadja's study in the United States widened his interpretation of the Indonesian law system, which was influenced by the Dutch legal system during the colonial era. One particular idea was the concept of law as a tool of social engineering by Roscoe Pound. The concept was altered by Kusumaatmadja to fit in the Indonesian legal environment and became a recurring theme in his writings. However, the concept contradicted the government's view on law, and Kusumaatmadja was forced to reside overseas.

== Academic career ==
Kusumaatmadja worked briefly at Bank Indonesia's Foreign Exchange Institute before becoming a lecturer at Padjadjaran University. He taught international law in the university, with a specialty in the field of the law of the sea. He also taught in other academic institutions, including the University of Indonesia and the Indonesian Army Command and General Staff College. Although he had already been made a professor by the time he obtained a doctorate, the professorship was not made official until 1966 due to the aforementioned conflict with the government.

Aside from his job as a lecturer, Kusumaatmadja acted for the defense in several legal cases. Two notable cases he handled in the 1960s were the Bremen Tobacco case and the MacDonald House bombing incident. He also became the conceptor for various statutes such as the law on Indonesia's waters and the country's doctrine regarding the continental shelf. The latter was produced after his tenure as the chief law-of-the-sea negotiator for Indonesia.

After the end of Sukarno's rule and the beginning of Suharto's rule in Indonesia, Kusumaatmadja was tasked to reform the law education curriculum in Indonesia. The new curriculum, which was introduced in 1972, gave more degrees of freedom to law students. Kusumaatmadja himself hoped that the curriculum could produce lawyers that improve the legal system of Indonesia instead of accepting it as it is. Inside his own university, Kusumaatmadja established a research institute for the law faculty. Several works that the institute has produced was the criteria of a "minimum law library" for law schools all over Indonesia to support the newly introduced curriculum and inventorying cases from the West Java Supreme Court that would later be used for case study and legal review.

== Government career ==
Kusumaatmadja was made Minister of Justice in a reshuffle of the Second Development Cabinet on 22 January 1974. One of his first actions was reviving the Institute of National Law Reform. Previously, the institute was largely dormant and had little to no operational budget. Kusumaatmadja renamed the institute, increased the amount of budget allocated from the institute, and altered the organizational structure. The re-organization, in particular, sought to bring legal academics closer to the lawmaking and law reform processes.

The revival of the Institute of National Law Reform managed to bear fruit in the form of an increase in legal research, workshops, and meetings in Indonesia. A workshop to coordinate legal research was held in September 1974, while a workshop aimed to document and index legal information was held in December 1974. Another significant result was in the form of agreed-upon legal terms, which Kusumaatmadja described as important to make the legal language "uniform, usable, and understandable to the people".

After serving as Minister of Justice for about four years, Kusumaatmadja was appointed Minister of Foreign Affairs in the Third Development Cabinet in 1978. He was re-appointed Foreign Minister in the next cabinet for the period 1983-1988, thus serving a total of ten years as foreign minister. During his period in office, Kusumaatmadja promoted the concept of "archipelagic state" to describe Indonesia. The concept was later recognized by the United Nations through the United Nations Convention on the Law of the Sea in 1982.

Aside from the archipelago state, one of his hallmarks as foreign minister was his support for cultural diplomacy, a concept aimed at improving Indonesia's image overseas. Nevertheless, his concept failed to emphasize proprietary issues that were rampant at that time. His focus instead was to present Indonesia as a civil country and dismiss its image as a militaristic and cronyistic country. The concept was promoted in various ways, such as the First International Gamelan Festival which was held in conjunction with the Expo 86 in Vancouver. However, other efforts to promote this concept, such as the exhibition of the Asmat tribe art in London and a dance performance by the Mangkunegaran troupe in the same city, were less successful. The former, in particular, was criticized due to the disrespectful treatment by Indonesian academics to the Asmat culture in the exhibition.

== Death ==
Kusumaatmadja died on the morning of 6 June 2021. He was buried on the same day at the Kalibata Heroes' Cemetery.

Following his death, former state secretary Yusril Ihza Mahendra proposed Kusumaatmadja be made a national hero. He was designated as such in 2025.

== Honours ==
=== National ===
- National Hero of Indonesia (10 November 2025)
- Star of Mahaputera, 2nd Class (Bintang Mahaputera Adipradana) (6 August 1974)
- Star of Mahaputera, 3rd Class (Bintang Mahaputera Utama) (8 August 1973)
- Military Distinguished Service Star (Bintang Dharma)
- Meritorius Service Star, 1st Class (Bintang Jalasena)

=== Foreign honours ===
- Austria:
  - Grand Decoration of Honour in Gold with Sash of the Decoration of Honour for Services to the Republic of Austria(1984)
- France:
  - Commandeur of the National Order of the Legion of Honour (1989)
- Philippines:
  - Grand Cross of the Order of Sikatuna, Rank of Datu (1980)
- South Korea:
  - Gwanghwa Medal of the Order of Diplomatic Service Merit (1979)
- Thailand:
  - Knight Grand Cross (First Class) of the Most Exalted Order of the White Elephant (1982)
- Yugoslavia:
  - Order of the Yugoslav Flag with Sash (1975)

== Bibliography ==
- "The Fourth Development Cabinet Announced March 17, 1983", Indonesia, 35 (35): 37–52, April 1983, doi:10.2307/3350864, hdl:1813/53763, JSTOR 3350864
- Katz, June S.; Katz, Ronald S. (1976), "Law Reform in Post-Sukarno Indonesia", The International Lawyer, 10 (2): 335–342, ISSN 0020-7810, JSTOR 40705273
- Cohen, Matthew Isaac (2019), "Three Eras of Indonesian Arts Diplomacy", Journal of the Humanities and Social Sciences of Southeast Asia, 175 (2–3): 253–283, doi:10.1163/22134379-17502022
- General Elections Institution (1973), Riwajat hidup anggota-anggota Majelis Permusyawaratan Rakyat hasil pemilihan umum 1971, Jakarta: General Elections Institution, pp. 1056–1057
- General Elections Institution (1978), Ringkasan riwayat hidup dan riwayat perjuangan anggota Majelis Permusyawaratan Rakyat hasil pemilihan umum tahun 1977 [Summary of Biography and Career of Members of the People's Consultative Assembly from the 1977 General Elections] (in Indonesian), Jakarta
