= List of ministers of law (Indonesia) =

Minister of Law
- Kementerian Hukum Manusia
- Emblem of the Coordinating Ministry of Law and Human Rights

- Flag of the coordinating Ministry of Law and Human Rights

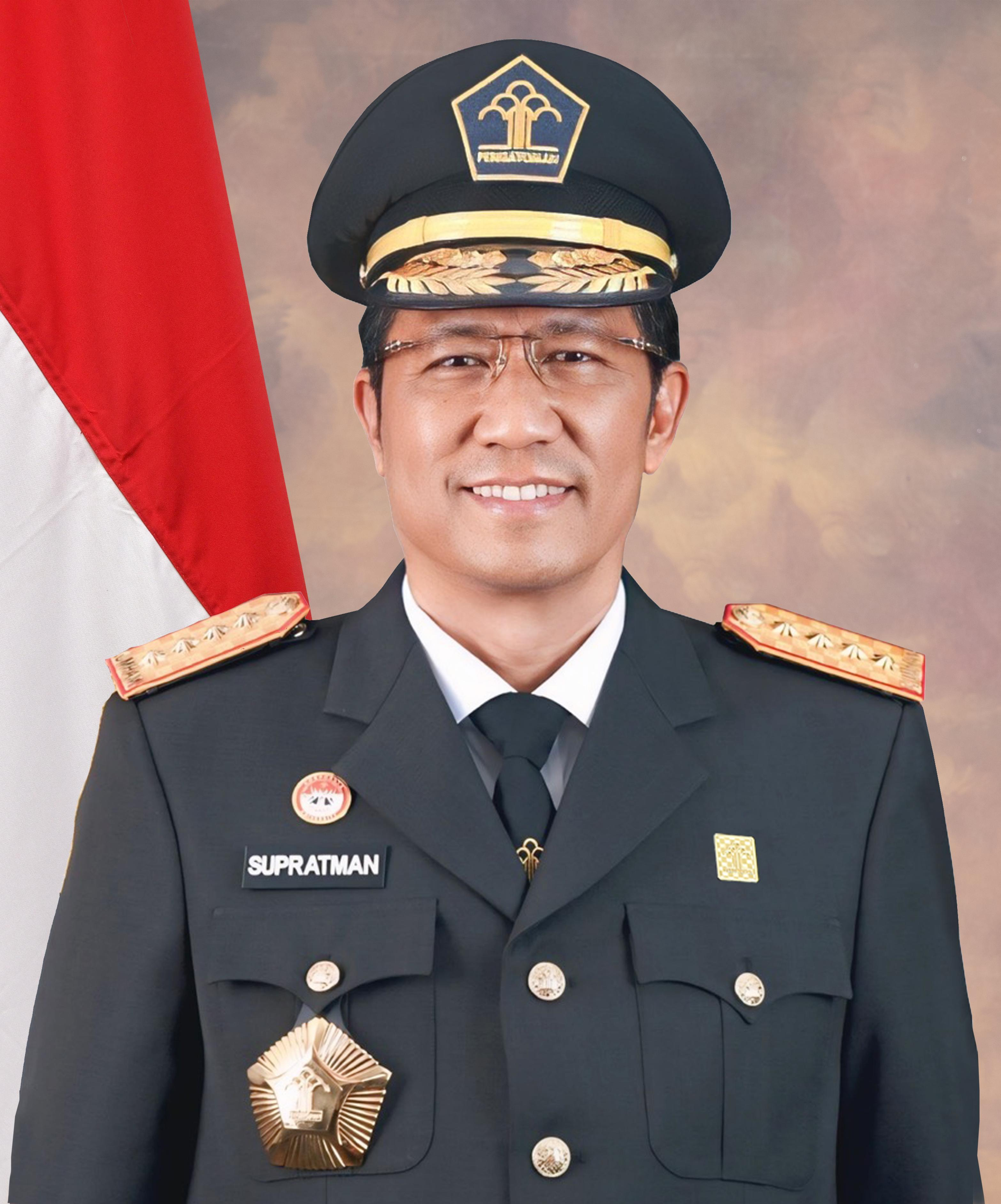
- Incumbent; Supratman Andi Agtas since 19 August 2024
- Appointer: President
- Term length: 5 years
- Inaugural holder: Soepomo
- Formation: 19 August 1945
- Website: www.kemenkumham.go.id

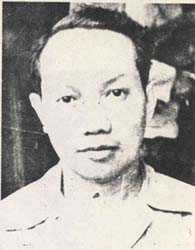
Soepomo was the first Minister of Justice, from 19 August to 14 November 1945.

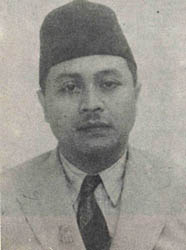
Abdoel Gaffar Pringgodigdo, Minister of Justice from 21 January to 6 September 1950.

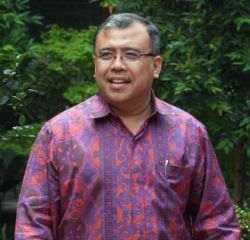
Patrialis Akbar, Minister of Law and Human Rights from 22 October 2009 to 19 October 2011.

The Minister of Law (Kementerian Hukum) is the head of the Ministry of Law (Indonesia), previously named Ministry of Law and Human Rights and changed to Ministry of Law by Prabowo Subianto. The first minister was Soepomo, who took office on 19 August 1945. The current minister is Supratman Andi Atgas, who took office on 19 August 2024. The longest serving was Ismael Saleh, who served ten years from 19 March 1983 to 17 March 1993. The shortest serving was Marsillam Simanjuntak, who served 48 days from 2 June to 20 July 2001.

== History ==
The position was established, along with the ministry, with the release of Law Number 2 of 1945 under the title Minister of Justice (Menteri Kehakiman). The first minister, Soepomo, was announced on 19 August 1945, 2 days after Indonesia's independence. Soepomo had control over several branches, including the high religious court, civil courts, supreme court, and, after its formation on 1 October 1945, the prosecutor general's office. In 1946, duty over the high religious courts was given to the minister of religion.

Through Legal Guideline number 19 of 1964, passed on 31 October 1964, the court system was divided into four: the general courts, the religious courts, the administrative courts, and the military tribunals. In 1965, with the passing of Law Number 13 of 1965, the civil court system was declared to be divided into three levels: the lower courts, the higher courts, and the supreme court.

== Duties ==
As the head of the Ministry of Law and Human Rights, the minister is tasked with overseeing legal and human rights matters as well as providing necessary information to the president.

== Ministers ==
Ministers of Justice of Indonesia
| # | Name | Cabinet | Period | Notes | Ref. |
|---|---|---|---|---|---|
| 1 | Soepomo | Presidential | 19 August – 14 November 1945 | Under the title "Minister of Justice" | |
| 2 | Soewandi | Sjahrir I | 14 November 1945 – 12 March 1946 | | |
| 2 | Soewandi | Sjahrir II | 12 March 1946 – 2 October 1946 | | |
| 3 | Susanto Tirtoprodjo | Sjahrir III | 2 October 1946 – 26 June 1947 | | |
| 3 | Susanto Tirtoprodjo | Amir Sjarifuddin I | 3 July – 11 November 1947 | | |
| 3 | Susanto Tirtoprodjo | Amir Sjarifuddin II | 11 November 1947 – 29 January 1948 | | |
| 3 | Susanto Tirtoprodjo | Hatta I | 29 January 1948 – 4 August 1949 | | |
| * | Lukman Hakim | Emergency | 19 December 1948 – 13 July 1949 | | |
| (3) | Susanto Tirtoprodjo | Hatta II | 4 August – 20 December 1949 | | |
| (1) | Supomo | Republic of the United; States of Indonesia | 20 December 1949 – 6 September 1950 | | |
| (3) | Susanto Tirtoprodjo | Susanto | 20 December 1949 – 21 January 1950 | | |
| 4 | A.G. Pringgodigdo | Halim | 21 January – 6 September 1950 | | |
| 5 | Wongsonegoro | Natsir | 6 September 1950 – 27 April 1951 | | |
| 6 | Mohammad Yamin | Sukiman | 27 April 1951 – 3 April 1952 | | |
| 7 | Lukman Wiriadinata | Wilopo | 3 April 1952 – 30 July 1953 | | |
| 8 | Djodi Gondokusumo | Ali Sastroamidjojo I | 30 July 1953 – 12 August 1955 | | |
| (7) | Lukman Wiriadinata | Burhanuddin Harahap | 12 August 1955 – 24 March 1956 | | |
| 9 | Muljatno | Ali Sastroamidjojo II | 24 March 1956 – 9 April 1957 | | |
| 10 | Gustaef A. Maengkom | Djuanda | 9 April 1957 – 10 July 1959 | | |
| 11 | Sahardjo | Working I | 10 July 1959 – 18 February 1960 | | |
| 11 | Sahardjo | Working II | 18 February 1960 – 6 March 1962 | | |
| 11 | Sahardjo | Working III | 6 March 1962 – 13 November 1963 | | |
| 12 | Astrawinata | Working IV | 13 November 1963 – 27 August 1964 | | |
| 12 | Astrawinata | Dwikora I | 27 August 1964 – 28 March 1966 | | |
| 13 | Wirjono Prodjodikoro | Dwikora II | 28 March – 25 July 1966 | | |
| 14 | Umar Seno Aji | Ampera I | 25 July 1966 – 17 October 1967 | | |
| 14 | Umar Seno Aji | Ampera II | 17 October 1967 – 6 June 1968 | | |
| 14 | Umar Seno Aji | Development I | 6 June 1968 – 28 March 1973 | | |
| 15 | Mochtar Kusumaatmadja | Development II | 28 March 1973 – 29 March 1978 | | |
| 16 | Mujono | Development III | 29 March 1978 – 9 February 1981 | | |
| 17 | Ali Said | Development III | 9 February 1981 – 19 March 1983 | | |
| 18 | Ismail Saleh | Development IV | 19 March 1983 – 21 March 1988 | | |
| 18 | Ismail Saleh | Development V | 21 March 1988 – 17 March 1993 | | |
| 19 | Oetojo Oesman | Development VI | 17 March 1993 – 16 March 1998 | | |
| 20 | Muladi | Development VII | 16 March – 21 May 1998 | | |
| 20 | Muladi | Development Reform | 23 May 1998 – 20 October 1999 | | |
| 21 | Yusril Ihza Mahendra | National Unity | 23 October 1999 – 7 February 2001 | Title changed to Minister of Law and Legislation | |
| 22 | Baharuddin Lopa | National Unity | 9 February – 2 June 2001 | | |
| 23 | Marsilam Simanjuntak | National Unity | 2 June – 20 July 2001 | | |
| 24 | Mohammad Mahfud | National Unity | 20 July – 9 August 2001 | | |
| (21) | Yusril Ihza Mahendra | Mutual Assistance | 10 August 2001 – 20 October 2004 | Title changed to Minister of Justice and Human Rights | |
| 25 | Hamid Awaluddin | United Indonesia I | 21 October 2004 – 7 May 2007 | Title changed to Minister of Law and Human Rights | |
| 26 | Andi Mattalata | United Indonesia I | 7 May 2007 – 20 October 2009 | | |
| 27 | Patrialis Akbar | United Indonesia II | 22 October 2009 – 19 October 2011 | | |
| 28 | Amir Syamsuddin | United Indonesia II | 19 October 2011 – 20 October 2014 | | |
| 29 | Yasonna Laoly | Working | 27 October 2014 – 19 August 2024 | | |
| 30 | Supratman Andi Agtas | Onward Indonesia | 19 August 2024 – 20 October 2024 | | |
| 30 | Supratman Andi Agtas | Red White Cabinet | 21 October 2024 – present | Minister of Law | |
