= Ali Said (judge) =

Indonesian judge and military officer

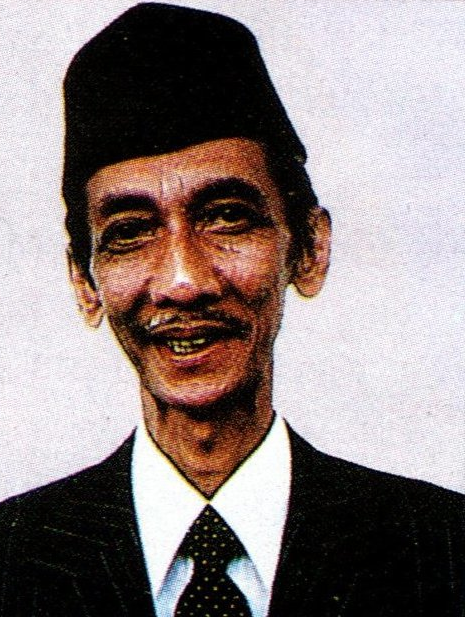
- Said in 1985

1st Chief of the National Commission on Human Rights
- In office 1993–1996
- President: Suharto
- Preceded by: Established
- Succeeded by: Djoko Soegianto

7th Chief Justice of the Supreme Court of Indonesia
- In office 1984–1992
- Nominated by: Suharto
- Preceded by: Mujono
- Succeeded by: Purwoto Gandasubrata

17th Minister of Law and Human Rights
- In office 9 February 1981 – 19 March 1983
- President: Suharto
- Preceded by: Mujono
- Succeeded by: Ismail Saleh

9th Attorney General of Indonesia
- In office 4 April 1973 – 18 February 1981
- President: Suharto
- Preceded by: Sugih Arto
- Succeeded by: Ismail Saleh

Personal details
- Born: 12 June 1927 Magelang, Central Java, Dutch East Indies
- Died: 28 June 1996 (aged 69) Jakarta, Indonesia
- Citizenship: Indonesian

Ali Said (1927–1996) was an Indonesian judge, military officer and politician. Like his predecessor Mujono, he was one of a string of former military officials to be appointed to the judiciary of Indonesia.

Said often worked closely with Ismail Saleh and Mujono. Said replaced Mujono as Minister of Law and then as Chief Justice of the Supreme Court of Indonesia; Saleh replaced Said as Attorney General and then Minister of Law. Together, the three were known as the "Three Punokawan" or clown servants of the epic hero due to their perceived enthusiasm for upholding the law.

Legal offices
Preceded by Established	Chief of the National Commission on Human Rights; 1993–1996	Succeeded by Djoko Soegianto
Preceded by Mujono	Chief Justice of the Supreme Court of Indonesia; 1984–1992	Succeeded by Purwoto Gandasubrata
Preceded by Mujono	Minister of Law and Human Rights; 1981–1983	Succeeded by Ismail Saleh
Preceded by Sugih Arto	Attorney General; 1973–1981	Succeeded by Ismail Saleh
