= Mujono =

Chief Justice of the Supreme Court of Indonesia

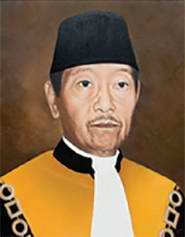

6th Chief Justice of the Supreme Court of Indonesia
- In office 18 February 1981 – 14 April 1984
- Nominated by: Suharto
- Preceded by: Umar Seno Aji
- Succeeded by: Ali Said

16th Minister of Law and Human Rights
- In office 28 March 1978 – 9 February 1981
- President: Suharto
- Preceded by: Mochtar Kusumaatmadja
- Succeeded by: Ali Said

Personal details
- Born: 30 July 1927 Jember Regency, East Java, Dutch East Indies
- Died: 14 April 1984 (aged 56) Jakarta, Indonesia
- Occupation: judge, military officer

Mujono (30 July 1927 – 14 April 1984) was the sixth Chief Justice of the Supreme Court of Indonesia as well as the 16th Minister of Law and Human Rights. His appointment to both posts began a line of former military officials predominating in Indonesia's legal system.

Born in East Java, Mujono was educated at the Military Law Academy from 1957 until 1962, and was part of the central leadership of the Golkar party from 1967 to 1971.

Mujono was appointed to the Ministry of Law and Human Rights in 1978 after a prior period of civilian officeholders. During his tenure as Minister of Law, Mujono continued the policy of executive interference in judicial affairs established by his predecessor on the Supreme Court, Umar Seno Aji. Mujono transferred a number of judges from central courts to outlying districts without consulting Aji, then Chief Justice; when Mujono left his position as Minister of Law to replace Aji as the Chief Justice, he began to call for a return of judicial responsibilities to the Supreme Court. His call took many as surprise since he would have been in a better position to implement such as change while he was still serving under the executive branch, which was in the dominant position.

Upon taking office as the Chief Justice, Mujono enacted a number of reforms upon which the Supreme Court structure is still based; the first former army general to be appointed as Chief Justice, he reportedly said at the beginning of his tenure that he'd overhaul the court's processes even if he needed to bring in tanks to do the job. In order to deal with the court's sizeable backlog of cases, he increased the number of the staff to the point where many of the chambers could operate autonomously. In the first fifteen months of his tenure, he increased the number of justices on the Supreme court from seventeen to twenty four; in his second year of office, he increased the number to its present level of fifty one justices. Additionally, he added "junior chairmen" to the court: four for the jurisdictions of general, religious, military and administrative (which included housing and labor) law, and three for appeals in civil, criminal and customary law.

The addition of more justices allowed Mujono to reconstruct the internal functions of the Supreme Court. Justices were organized into eight teams alphabetically organized after the names of Indonesian birds, and those eight teams would oversee the seventeen chambers. Each chamber was required to resolve a minimum of fifty cases per month; the emphasis on simply reducing the backlog rather than assigning teams to cases that fit their expertise is a practice of the court which continues until today. Starting from 1981, each justice also had to oversee multiple appeals courts, some of which required the justices to travel to other regions of the country in order to keep lines of communication between the Supreme Court and lower courts open.

Mujono's restructuring was not without its problems, though his narrow focus on reducing the backlog succeeded. By 1984, he reported to then President Suharto that the backlog had been nearly eliminated; Mujono died a few weeks later. Ali Said, another former military general, replaced Mujono as Chief Justice just as he'd replaced him as Minister of Law three years prior.

Legal offices
Preceded by Umar Seno Aji	Chief Justice of the Supreme Court of Indonesia; 1981–1984	Succeeded by Ali Said
Preceded by Mochtar Kusumaatmadja	Minister of Law and Human Rights; 1978–1981	Succeeded by Ali Said
