= Abdul Irsan =

Indonesian diplomat (1939–2013)

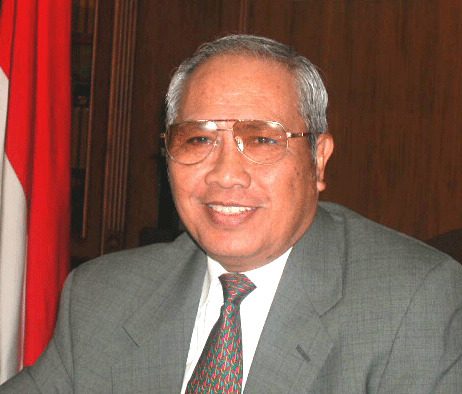

Ambassador of Indonesia to Japan
- In office 19 February 2003 – 30 April 2006
- President: Megawati Sukarnoputri; Susilo Bambang Yudhoyono
- Preceded by: Soemadi Brotodiningrat
- Succeeded by: Jusuf Anwar

Ambassador of Indonesia to the Netherlands
- In office 20 October 1998 – 2 August 2002
- President: B. J. Habibie; Abdurrahman Wahid; Megawati Sukarnoputri
- Preceded by: Soedarmanto Kadarisman
- Succeeded by: Mohammad Jusuf

Secretary General of the Department of Foreign Affairs
- In office 23 May 1995 – 30 November 1998
- Minister: Ali Alatas
- Preceded by: Soewarno Danusutedjo
- Succeeded by: Rahardjo Jamtomo

Director General of Protocol and Consular Affairs
- In office 24 December 1993 – 23 May 1995
- Preceded by: Soedarmanto Kadarisman
- Succeeded by: Dadang Sukandar

Ambassador of Indonesia to New Zealand
- In office 15 January 1992 – 1993
- President: Suharto
- Preceded by: Darwoto
- Succeeded by: Tengku Dahlia Soemolang

Personal details
- Born: October 14, 1939 Sampang, East Java, Indonesia
- Died: March 13, 2013 (aged 73) Jakarta, Indonesia
- Children: 4
- Education: University of Indonesia (S.H.)

Abdul Irsan (14 October 1939 – 13 March 2013) was an Indonesian career diplomat who has held multiple positions in the foreign ministry and abroad. He was Indonesia's ambassador to New Zealand, Fiji, and Samoa from 1992 to 1993, to the Netherlands from 1998 to 2002, and to Japan and Micronesia from 2002 to 2006. Within the foreign ministry, he has held senior positions such as the director general of protocol and consular affairs from 1993 to 1995 and secretary general from 1995 to 1998.

== Early life and education ==
Abdul Irsan was born on October 14, 1939, in Sampang, Madura. During his childhood, he witnessed the occupation of Malang during the Dutch's Operation Product in 1947, which he later described as traumatizing. Abdul completed high school in Malang in July 1958 and moved to Jakarta by September of the same year. He initially planned to apply for the Physical Education Academy (now the sports faculty of the Indonesia University of Education) in Bandung, but figured out he already passed the deadline. He then joined his friends from Malang who applied for law at the University of Indonesia. As a college student, Abdul partied so much in his first year that he forgot to take exams as a prerequisite to pass. He quickly refocused himself and received his law degree from the University of Indonesia in the March of 1964. Contrary to most students at that time, Abdul refused to join student political movement or any extra-university organizations and opposed the presence of students with political affiliations within student senates.

After graduation, Abdul and his friends applied for the prosecution service. Upon passing the examination process, Abdul was given the choice to be posted in either Palangka Raya or Salatiga, and was given a month to thoroughly consider his choice. While mulling over his choice of posting, a friend invited him to apply for the foreign department while passing by the department's office in Pejambon. He was accepted as a diplomat on 1 June 1964 and withdrew from the prosecution.

== Diplomatic career ==
=== Directorate of Protocol ===
Abdul's initial assignment was at the protocol directorate, with a wage of 2,800 rupiahs (equivalent to IDR809,139 in 2025). As his wage was barely enough to cover his daily living, he and his friends took odd jobs servicing families who just returned from abroad. His side income was sufficient for him to live comfortably for a month or two. Unlike most directorates in the department at that time, relations between diplomats in the directorate were much more cordial and less hierarchical.

Within the directorate, Abdul was the chief of dispensations section. As Indonesia was undergoing a confrontation with Malaysia, diplomats in Jakarta who wanted to visit Malaysia or Singapore had to obtain exemption from the foreign department in the form of a diplomatic note. The diplomats usually visit Malaysia and Singapore for health purposes due to the subpar medical facilities in Indonesia at that time. The section was also responsible for informing regional governments regarding plans of visit to a certain region by diplomats. Diplomats in Jakarta frequently criticized the practice of requiring access from Abdul's section, as they felt that the Vienna Convention on Diplomatic Relations provided them diplomatic immunity to travel within their host country. Abdul often exchanged information and opinion during engagements with diplomats of other countries, as the flow of information were strictly limited at that time. Abdul and his colleagues were more frequently invited by foreign diplomats for a meal at their official residence and embassies, rather than the inverse.

In 1966, Abdul was tasked to lead a number of protocol officers to Bali in light of the Bandung Conference decennial. One of the challenges he faced was installing thirty flags of the participating countries in accordance to international protocol, which was made difficult due to the heavy winds. On another occasion, the protocol directorate's decision to send Abdul as a protocol officer in company of President Sukarno at the 2nd Asia-Africa conference in Algiers on 29 June 1965 sparked controversy, as some protocol officers felt that it was unfair to send someone as junior as him for an overseas assignment. Abdul attempted to withdraw to prevent stirring up further controversy, but his request was rejected and Abdul remained in the president's Algiers entourage. Upon arriving in Cairo on the morning of 29 June, the entourage was informed of a coup d'état going on in Algeria, and after some consultations with other heads of state Sukarno decided to cancel his presence. Sukarno then stayed for two nights in Paris, conducting discussion with ambassadors of West European countries regarding geopolitical developments. In Paris, Abdul's junior status was brought up again when a senior diplomat questioned his presence in the president's entourage.

Shortly prior to the 30 September Movement which overthrew Sukarno, in July 1965 Abdul was tasked to accompany a group of acupuncturist from China who was sent to treat President Sukarno. The presence of the acupuncturist became a point of controversy, with some claiming it as a hoax, and was later used as one of the justification to remove Sukarno from power. As the foreign minister at that time, Subandrio, was arrested on the grounds of orchestrating the movement, the foreign department's intelligence agency became a target of protest, with students later occupying the foreign department complex.

Sukarno remained a figurehead president until his eventual removal from office in 1967, and despite his nominal positions foreign ambassadors frequently invited him for dinner. Sometime in October or November 1966, Sukarno was invited for a dinner by the Argentine ambassador at the ambassador's official residence. Abdul was the only one willing to accompany Sukarno as the protocol officer, as almost everyone in the directorate refused to take on the task with various reasons. Abdul tried to justify his participation by stating that his junior status would not cause trouble in the future, and that he did it as part of his responsibility rather than for political reasons. After the dinner, Sukarno patted his left shoulder and looked at him for a few second. The assignment became his last encounter with Sukarno until Sukarno's death in 1970.

=== Basic diplomatic education ===
Sometime between September and October 1966, Abdul successfully applied to take part in a one-year diplomatic course at the Institut International d'Administration Publique (IIAP). Although the cultural section of the French embassy mandated his presence in Paris by mid-December, Abdul was allowed to arrive later in January next year as he was waiting for the birth of his first children. After transiting in Saigon for an hour, he arrived in Paris on 7 January 1967 and was immediately driven by his colleague to the Indonesian embassy, where he stayed for the night before managing administration and accommodation. In July 1967, Abdul was summoned by the Indonesian embassy's chief of culture and education section, and was informed that the French government planned to extend the course to 26 months, including a training program at a French embassy overseas. After two days of mulling over the option, Abdul refused to undergo the extension, citing family and financial reasons. Despite threat from the foreign department's director general of special affairs Major-General Chaeruddin Tasning for him to "comply with the arrangements or withdraw from the foreign service", as well as similar advice from his colleagues and the embassy, Abdul persisted with his decision, and in September 1967 returned to Jakarta.

After returning to Jakarta, Abdul reported to Chaeruddin, who immediately recognized his face as Chaeruddin frequently hitched the protocol directorate's car, which was driven by Abdul for state events. After explaining his reason, Chaeruddin eventually understood and recommended him to attend the general basic course for foreign service officer (Susdubat, Kursus Dasar Umum Pejabat Dinas Luar Negeri), which at that time was on its second semester. His nine-month IIAP course would be registered as his first semester in the Susdubat. His friends, who prepared a farewell ceremony for his withdrawal from the foreign service, was flabbergasted upon seeing Abdul leaving Chaeruddin's room with a bright face.

=== Assignment in Bangkok ===
Abdul completed Susdubat in 1968. The department's director of Asia-Pacific affairs, Soepardjo Rustam, attempted to recruit Susdubat graduates to be posted at embassies in Asia-Pacific countries. Only Abdul and another diplomat answered Supardjo's appeal, as most of his colleagues were reluctant due to the raging conflict in the Indochina region, which they fear could spread to other Asian countries. Abdul was then assigned at the embassy in Bangkok, with him departing on 4 Juni 1968. His family followed a month later. As a junior diplomat, he served with the diplomatic rank of third secretary in the political section under Sunarso Wongsonegoro (later ambassador to the Holy See), whom he credited for teaching him diplomatic manners and gave him a multitude of opportunities without restraints. He was later promoted to second secretary after a few years of service. In 1971, President Suharto and First Lady Siti Hartinah visited Thailand, and Abdul was put in charge of protocol matters during the state visit in relations to his prior experience. During the visit, Abdul personally accompanied Siti Hartinah during her visit to the Usawadee Rose Garden.

Due to his juniority, Abdul described himself being treated as a "garbage bin" for all sorts of instructions and duties, which he later credited for speeding up his learning process. As he was never invited to take part in the embassy's diplomatic circles, he and other diplomats from other countries initiated a Wednesday Club, where junior diplomats would gather every Wednesday to discuss all sorts of international issues as well as social initiatives. The Wednesday Club attracted attention from embassies, and club members was frequently invited to diplomatic functions and events. On one occasion, Abdul was frequently approached by a Soviet diplomat named Viktor Mizin, who somehow figured out her wife's birthday and sent her flowers on her birthday. It was later revealed that Mizin was a KGB operative who was declared persona non grata for espionage activities.

=== In the inspectorate general and ICCS ===
Abdul was initially slated to return for Jakarta in early 1972, but was delayed to the end of June. Upon returning to Indonesia, he was briefly assigned as assistant inspector at the political inspectorate of the foreign department's inspectorate general. At that time, the inspectorate general was a newly established agency headed by senior diplomat Artati Marzuki-Sudirdjo. One of his first tasks in his new position was to draft the specified mission of each and every Indonesia's diplomatic missions abroad. However, in the midst of his assignment, Abdul was informed that he was to be dispatched as a legal adviser for Indonesia's mission to the International Commission on Control and Supervision (ICCS). Abdul was part of a 16-men team from the foreign department, led by former ambassador to Hungary Imrad Idris as the mission's political deputy. The entire mission was led by Hartono Rekso Dharsono, his former superior in Bangkok. A day after the Paris Peace Accords was signed, on 28 January 1973 the mission headed to Saigon. The mission was initially sheltered at a former U.S. army barrack before being accommodated at the Palace Hotel in Saigon. Upon examining the accords, Imrad drafted a division of responsibility between the military and diplomatic team. Sometime in mid-March 1973, Abdul accompanied armed forced deputy commander Sumitro for an inspection of the military contingent. Abdul frequently discussed about Southeast Asia's condition and developments with Sumitro throughout the visit, and he praised Sumitro for having a strong memory and analysis. In one instance, Abdul asked on Indonesia's participation in the ICCS, to which Sumitro replied that the involvement was part of Indonesia's free and active foreign policy. After the mission concluded, Abdul was requested to stay for a while to accompany Imrad in drafting his end-of-mission report. His position in the contingent was replaced by Samsubahri Siregar, and Abdul returned to the political inspectorate to continue his duties.

Sometime in early 1974, Abdul was informed by Sunarso Wongsonegoro, who by this time had been transferred as the head of administration in the secretariat general, regarding his appointment as secretary to the chair of the permanent working group for foreign affairs (Pokjatap, Kelompok Kerja Tetap Luar Negeri), which was the foreign department's secretary general Ashari Danudirdjo. The working group was one of the two ad-hoc establishment in the foreign department to implement a joint ministerial decision. The main responsibility of the two agencies were to coordinate policies and the overlapping of duties. Ashari later explained to him that the Pokjatap is responsible for formulating policy papers that would later be discussed at a ministerial level to produce a joint report that would be delivered to the president. After Ashari finished explaining, Abdul immediately questioned whether he was not too junior for the position, which prompted Sunarso to signal him to shut. Despite this, Ashari gently persuaded him, which convinced Abdul to accept the position.

Being Ashari's secretary in the Pokjatap gave Abdul access to high-level echelons in the foreign department as well as military figures such as L. B. Moerdani, Sumitro, and Hasnan Habib. Abdul also frequently interacted with foreign ambassadors who were waiting for a meeting with Ashari. Abdul also noted Ashari's willingness to discuss matters outside his scope of duty, including the foreign department's internal matters, which allowed him to act as a bridge between junior diplomats and the foreign department's top echelons. Aside from Pokjatap, Ashari also entrusted him for a similar position in the meeting of Indonesian heads of mission in the Asia-Pacific region. As Abdul was still structurally an assistant inspector in the inspectorate general, he still had to work on preparing the specified mission drafts, although his superiors allowed him to dedicate more time for his ad-hoc secretary position. Despite the responsibilities that he had to undertook, he was allowed to enroll in the foreign department's mid-level diplomatic course. His responsibilities exempted him from taking part in study tours, with a substitute task of reviewing an English language book on law and international relations. Abdul completed the mid-level diplomatic education with a satisfactory result, and by the mid-1975 the head of the foreign department's personnel bureau Anwar Wardoyo offered him another posting at a Southeast Asian country.

=== Public relations ===
Ashari relented to relieve Abdul from his duties as secretary, on the condition that he had to find a replacement. Abdul offered his position to Wisber Loeis who, after several discussions, accepted the new position with approval from Ashari. The foreign department's head of the foreign department's personnel then offered him three distinct postings: political chief at the embassy in Malaysia, in the Philippines, or as information chief at the embassy in Singapore. After being advised by colleagues, Abdul handed over the choice to the personnel bureau, who decided to go with the Singapore option. After seeking advise on the scope of his duties from the foreign department's director of foreign information Abdurrahman Gunadirdja, on 12 May 1975, he was sent to Singapore as the embassy's chief of information and culture with the diplomatic rank of first secretary, and later, counsellor. Abdul had to learn public and human relations from existing literatures due to him being new in the position. Around the time of his appointment, Abdul stated that Indonesia's relations with Singapore at that time were "at its closest" and encouraged the press to maintain it. In response to reports about the dismissal of Hartono Rekso Dharsono's from the ASEAN secretary general position, Abdul summarily denied it and called upon Singaporeans to verify with the embassy news on Indonesia from foreign publications.

As Abdul was also double-hatted as the chief of socio-cultural and education section of the embassy, Abdul was responsible for supervising the Indonesian school in Singapore. In response to the influx of Indonesian students pursuing their primary and secondary education in Singapore, Abdul proposed to only allow Indonesian to pursue higher education in the country. The policy was later enforced and announced by Abdul, although it was reverted during the tenure of acting education minister J. B. Sumarlin. Abdul departed Singapore in mid-May 1979, with a farewell ceremony being held by the Union of Malay Journalists in Singapore on 14 April 1979.

From Singapore, Abdul returned for an appointment as the chief of administration in the directorate of foreign information, where he exchanged posts with Rochsjad Dahlan. Rochsjad became his replacement in Singapore, while Abdul replaced him in the directorate of foreign information. As at that time the leadership of the directorate was vacant following the departure of Mohammad Hatta to Tokyo, Abdul became the acting director of foreign information until S. A. M. Alaydroes was appointed permanently on 25 September 1979. He served until 1982 and, during his tenure in the directorate, completed his senior diplomatic training. His total tenure in public relations related matters was seven years, the most of any other posting in his career, which made him recognized as one of the foreign department's PR expert. During this period, Abdul was entrusted to formulate a guideline on information related matters for Indonesia's diplomatic mission abroad.

=== In Hong Kong ===
Abdul completed senior diplomatic education in March 1982 and was conferred a new diplomatic rank of minister counsellor. He immediately departed for his new assignment as the political chief at the consulate general in Hong Kong, where his main duty was to follow and observe political developments through information channels available in Hong Kong. At that time, Indonesia did not have any diplomatic relations with China, and there were differences in opinion regarding attempts to re-establish diplomatic relations, with opposition from the military who viewed China as a potential threat to national security. Abdul frequently gathered with intelligence operatives from other countries to exchange information on China. As there were no other Indonesian representatives in these circles, the other intelligence operatives regarded Abdul as one of them. One of the sources that Abdul made frequent contacts with was a university professor in Hong Kong, who frequently visited mainland China, allowing him to have an in-depth knowledge of Chinese matters. The information he obtained were then relayed to the foreign department's Asia Pacific directorate. At one time, Abdul paid a courtesy call to Xinhua, the Chinese's state-owned news agency, whose representative office in Hong Kong were filled with diplomats who disguised themselves as reporters. During the talks, the "reporters" frequently expressed their wishes for a restoration of diplomatic relations with Indonesia, and emphasized that China's involvement in the 30 September Movement was a misunderstanding.

=== Investigation ===
About eighteen months into his tenure in Hong Kong, in April 1984 the secretary of the directorate general of political affairs John Muzhar asked him on his willingness to be recalled for the director of foreign information position. Abdul expressed his readiness but stated that he needs to wait another two months to pass the twenty-month standard limit for a posting. In early June 1984, Abdul returned to Jakarta and was informed that he will be installed for the position on 25 June 1984. Just five days before the planned ceremony, the foreign minister cancelled his appointment, and later that month Abdul was summoned by the foreign department's secretary general Soedarmono. According to Soedarmono, the foreign minister had received an information from someone that Abdul issued a statement against the minister's policy in Hong Kong, and that the foreign department would investigate the case.

Due to the ongoing investigation against him, Abdul was suspended from duty indefinitely. Almost all of his colleagues shunned him and Abdul refused to go to the foreign department's office. By the graces of the foreign department's chief of research and development at that time, Fuad Hassan, Abdul was given a room at the research and development agency, which he could use for duties of sorts. Abdul still continued receiving his basic salary, with his former staff in the information helping him collect it. Abdul spend his time reading books on management, especially on corporate strategic planning. His children jokingly compared him to Ponirah, the main character of the movie Ponirah Terpidana.

=== Bureau chief and director ===
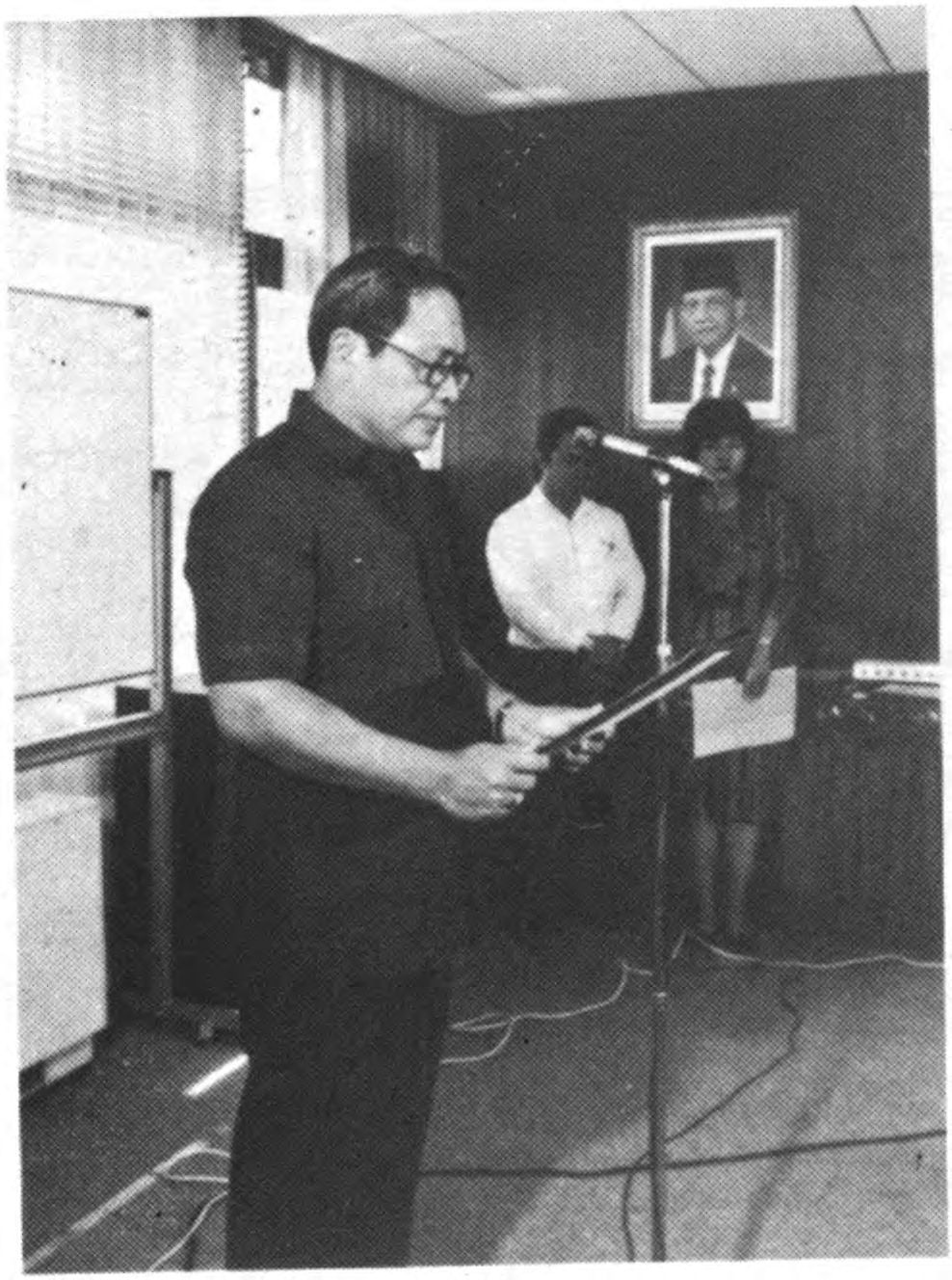
Abdul installing members of the foreign elections committee in January 1986.

At one point, Abdul received an invitation to a wedding where the foreign minister was present. Abdul had a lengthy talk with the foreign minister with no mentions of his supposed case. Shortly afterwards, around February 1985 the secretary of the tri-decennial anniversary of the Bandung Conference Wisber Loeis requested his assistance to organize the event. His colleagues who had previously shy away from him congratulated him for the new assignment. A few months later, in July Abdul was appointed as the chief of the newly formed bureau of planning in the foreign department's secretariat general, replacing Sukarno Hardjosudarno who was sent to Manila as deputy chief of mission. After he was installed in August 1985, he was instructed to formulate the foreign department's strategic planning, a topic which coincidentally he learned during his off-duty times. The head of political research and development agency, Sumaryo Suryokusumo, assisted him in the duty. Abdul also spearheaded ijon, a talent scouting program which offered service scholarships to outstanding students of the ten best state universities in Indonesia, although it was discontinued due to criticism from private colleges. During the preparations for the 1987 legislative election, on 11 November 1985 Abdul was appointed to lead the foreign elections committee, responsible for managing elections abroad.

After his service in the planning bureau, Abdul was initially slated to substitute Sukarno Hardjosudarno for a second time in Manila. However, two weeks later the decision was cancelled and Abdul became the Asia Pacific director in August 1986. He replaced Taufik Rachman Soedarbo, his former colleague in the ICCS. As director, Abdul frequently accompanied foreign minister Mochtar Kusumaatmadja and director general of political affairs Nana Sutresna in their trips abroad. Abdul was responsible for implementing a number of initiatives spearheaded by the foreign minister in the Asia Pacific region, including the deportation of refugees from the Galang Island and Indonesia's role as an interlocutor between different Cambodian parties in the aftermath of the Cambodian–Vietnamese War. He was involved in preparing the 1st Jakarta Informal Meeting, an Indonesian initiative to gather conflicting parties in Cambodia, which was held in July 1988.

=== Consul general in Los Angeles ===
On 6 August 1988, Abdul was installed by foreign minister Ali Alatas as consul general in Los Angeles, in which he was instructed to promote tourism and to involve Indonesians in Los Angeles in ensuring the success of the Indonesian Cultural Exhibition from 1990 to 1991. Prior to this, Soedarmono informed him of plans to post him as the deputy chief of mission in Vienna, but was cancelled for no apparent reason. He received his exequatur, which marked the beginning of his duties, on 6 October 1988. Under his leadership, the consulate general organized its first Indonesian crafts exhibition. Abdul frequently engaged with Indonesians living in the city, who were mostly Bataks and Manados, which he jokingly abbreviated as Batmans.

=== Australia and New Zealand ===
Just several months short of the cultural exhibition, in October 1989 Abdul was reassigned to the embassy in Canberra, Australia, as its deputy chief of mission. He was informed of his appointment by a wire received by the acting consul general Johan Syahperi Saleh. Abdul appealed to delay the appointment due to personal (his child has just started college and high school in Los Angeles) and professional (he has just only served for thirteen months and had formulated plans to increase Indonesia's exports in the region) reasons. Suwarno then recommended him to directly speak with the foreign minister on the matter, and the foreign minister later instructed him to resolve Indonesia's matter in the country within six months upon his appointment. Abdul was to replace Axioma Sudiro who died in office a few months earlier. As deputy chief of mission, Abdul was responsible in handling the day-to-day operations of the embassy and assisted the ambassador in management affairs. However, most of his time was spent handling the negative coverage of Indonesia by the Australian press. Sometime in 1992, while he was attending an event in Brisbane, a reporter revealed the name of the diplomat who reported him to the foreign minister, but he refused to take action.

From Australia, Abdul became the ambassador to New Zealand, with concurrent accreditation to Fiji and Samoa, on 15 January 1992. Unlike Australia, at that time Indonesia did not have any major political interests in New Zealand. As cabinet ministers were very approachable, Abdul frequently invited them for lunch or dinner. Abdul encouraged cultural diplomacy through the establishment of a Gamelan group to strengthen ties between the two country, and gave the name Padhang Moncar to the performing gamelan group. Abdul was also accredited to the Fiji, West Samoa, and unofficially to New Zealand's associated state of the Cook Islands. During the presentation of credentials, both the governor generals of Fiji and West Samoa expressed their expectations for direct trade links with Indonesia to prevent dependence on Australia and New Zealand.

=== Director general and secretary general ===
Sixteen months into his ambassadorial tenure, Abdul received a call from Suwarno informing him of the foreign minister's offer for the director general of protocol and consular affairs position. Abdul questioned the appointment as he felt that he was not the right fit for the position due to his straightforward personality, but the foreign minister insisted on his decision. Abdul then returned to Indonesia in September 1993 for a four-month adjustment to the new position (which he described as an "internship") before being officially installed on 24 December 1993. In this position, he acted as the chief of state protocol under the minister of state secretariat and was responsible in directing president Suharto's engagement with foreign guests and diplomats. One of the major incidents that occurred during his tenure as the state chief protocol was during President Suharto's state visit to Dresden, which was marred with heavy protest from NGOs against Indonesia's occupation of East Timor. Hundreds of pro-democracy activists staged a protest against President Suharto during his visit to the Zwinger Museum, with one person being able to close in and smash Suharto's head with a newspaper due to the leniency of the local police and authorities. The tumult caused Abdul to cut short the visit, and immediately coordinated with the police to safely transport Suharto to his accommodation as soon as possible.

Following a three-year stint in the role, Abdul became the secretary general of the foreign department on 23 May 1995, replacing Soewarno Danusutedjo who had been in the position for seven years. Abdul encouraged the transformation of the foreign service into a "merit-based organization". Outside his official duties, Abdul also become the Indonesian Council on World Affairs chairman of advisory board following its establishment in December 1997. During the financial crisis that struck Indonesia, Abdul considered the closure of several embassies, despite his initial reluctance, and recalled one-sixth of its diplomat abroad as austerity measures. In response to major riots in Indonesia's capital Jakarta, Abdul guaranteed the safety of foreign diplomats and citizens and had hinted the armed forces to include the safety of expatriates as their top priority. Abdul also managed to secure pension funds for retired ambassadors and procured land located north of the foreign department. He also initiated the recruitment of graduates outside of the humanities major, although it was discontinued later on. He stepped down by his own request and was replaced as secretary general by Rahardjo Jamtomo, formerly ambassador of Indonesia to the United Kingdom, on 30 November 1998.

=== In Netherlands and Japan ===
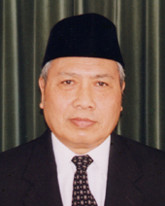
Abdul Irsan as ambassador to the Netherlands.

After Suharto was ousted and replaced by his vice president B. J. Habibie, on 20 October 1998 Abdul became Indonesia's ambassador to the Netherlands. He presented his credentials to Queen Beatrix of the Netherlands on 16 December 1998. In February 2000, Abdul accompanied president Abdurrahman Wahid during his state visit to the Netherlands. Abdul later gained nationwide attention for boycotting the 400th anniversary celebration of the VOC in 2002 after he was invited by Queen Beatrix to attend the anniversary at the Ridderzaal. Abdul stated that his refusal to attend was done at the instruction of the foreign ministry and citing the principles of Indonesia's constitution which was explicitly against colonialism. Abdul later authored a lengthy op-ed on the issue at one of the Netherlands leading newspaper, stating that celebration would never be acceptable to Indonesians and the event was an affront to the Indonesian struggle for independence. He utilized the Dutch media to explain that Indonesia could not celebrate an era of oppression and criticized the "imbalance" of historical narratives dominated by Western viewpoints. Abdul's tenure was extended twice: first in early November 2001, where it was extended to late March 2002, and second on 20 March 2002, where his return was delayed as he was instructed to attend the oral hearing on the Sipadan Ligitan island dispute case in the International Court of Justice as the co-agent for Indonesia. Abdul held a farewell call with Queen Beatrix of the Netherlands on 25 March 2002, where he was conferred the Knight Grand Cross of the Order of Orange-Nassau as a sign of bilateral fraternity. His ambassadorial term in the Netherlands ended on 2 August 2002 and departed home two days later. During his career break, Abdul authored a book on the bilateral relations between the two countries, titled Hubungan Indonesia-Belanda: Antara Benci dan Rindu (Indonesia-Netherlands Relations: Between Hate and Longing).

On 20 March 2002, Abdul was nominated by president Megawati Sukarnoputri as ambassador to Japan, with concurrent accreditation to Micronesia. Although the House of Representatives objected his appointment due to his old age, the government proceeded to nominate him for approval by the Japanese government. Siswo Pramono, a diplomat who would later go on to become Indonesia's ambassador to Australia, criticized the objections by the House and stated that "age is irrelevant in the quest to determine who is a good diplomat". The Japanese government gave its assent on Abdul's posting in Japan on 22 October, stating that the controversy on Abdul's age "rests entirely on Indonesia's behalf". After the approval was made public, the House immediately inquired the government regarding its decision to nominate Abdul. The issue was resolved on 29 January 2003 and Abdul was finally installed on 19 February 2003. He presented his credentials to Emperor Akihito of Japan on 10 April 2003 and to president Joseph Urusemal of Micronesia on 22 January 2004. In March 2006 Abdul apologized for illegal levies leveled at consular and citizen services in the embassy. Abdul vacated his position on 30 April 2006 and was replaced by chargé d'affaires ad interim Iwan Wiranataatmadja.

== Personal life ==
Abdul is married since 11 September 1965 with four children. Abdul died on 13 March 2013 and was buried at the Jeruk Purut public cemetery.
