= Mohammad Jusuf (diplomat) =

Indonesian diplomat (born 1943)

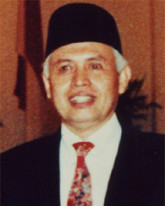

Ambassador of Indonesia to the Netherlands
- In office 30 September 2002 – 9 November 2005
- President: Megawati Sukarnoputri; Susilo Bambang Yudhoyono
- Preceded by: Abdul Irsan
- Succeeded by: Junus Effendi Habibie

Head of the Agency for Policy Research and Development
- In office 17 July 2000 – 3 May 2002
- Minister: Alwi Shihab; Hassan Wirajuda
- Preceded by: Adian Silalahi
- Succeeded by: Ibrahim Yusuf

Personal details
- Born: May 14, 1943 (age 83) Surabaya, East Java, Indonesia
- Education: Padjadjaran University (S.H.)

Mohammad Jusuf (born 14 May 1943) is an Indonesian diplomat who served as ambassador to the Netherlands from 2002 to 2006. A career diplomat, Jusuf worked in the foreign department for more than three decades, culminating with his appointment as the chief of research and development for foreign issues.

== Early life and education ==
Mohammad Jusuf was born in Surabaya on 14 May 1943. He received his bachelor's degree in international law from the Padjadjaran University in Bandung.

== Diplomatic career ==
Jusuf officially joined the foreign department in 1972, beginning a career that spanned three decades. Upon completing basic diplomatic training in 1974, he served as the section chief in the directorate of legal and international treaties in Jakarta between 1975 and 1977. During this period, he was a member of the Indonesian delegation to preparatory meetings for extradition treaties with Malaysia in Jakarta and Singapore in 1974. He was also involved in the organizing committee for the 1976 ASEAN Summit in Denpasar, Bali.

His first overseas posting was at the permanent mission to the United Nations in New York, where he interned with the rank of attaché from 1977 before being promoted to the diplomatic rank of third secretary a short while later. He was appointed as the second secretary of the United Nations General Assembly Sixth Committee, responsible for legal affairs, and in 1981 represented Indonesia at the Committee for United Nations Charter Sessions and the UN Commission Meeting on International Trade Law (UNCITRAL) in both New York and Vienna. Throughout his early career in both Jakarta and New York, Jusuf took part on behalf of Indonesia in the United Nations Conference on the Law of the Sea (UNCLOS) and the UN General Assembly.

Returning to Jakarta in 1981, he became the deputy director of the directorate of legal and international treaties. In this capacity, he participated in bilateral meetings regarding foreign investment protection agreements and negotiations on double taxation and evasion from 1982 to 1985. He also attended a mid-level diplomatic education program in 1984. His career continued abroad from 1985 to 1989, where he joined the embassy in Islamabad, Pakistan, with the diplomatic rank of first secretary. He was later promoted to the diplomatic rank of counsellor and became the embassy's chargé d'affaires ad interim following the departure of ambassador Prasodjo Mahdi sometime in 1988. Upon his return to Indonesia in 1989, he was appointed deputy director of Southeast Asia within the directorate of Asia and Pacific. On the same year, he completed his senior diplomatic training. During this tenure, he played a role in organizing the Jakarta Informal Meeting (JIM) on Cambodia and participated in bilateral joint commissions with Australia and Malaysia in 1990 and 1991.

Between 1991 and 1996, Jusuf returned to New York with the diplomatic rank of counsellor. He headed the political and disarmament affairs division and shortly after was promoted to minister counsellor. His expertise in security led to his appointment as vice chairman of the United Nations Ad Hoc Committee on the Indian Ocean for a Peace Zone and chairman of the Committee of Disarmament Meeting for the Non-Aligned Movement. He also presented at the 1995 UN Meeting on Disarmament in Nagasaki, Japan. He returned to Jakarta to assume duties as the secretary of the foreign department's inspectorate general from 1996 to 1998, during which he received the Civil Servants' Long Service Medal, 2nd Class (Indonesian: Satyalancana Karya Satya XX Tahun) in 1996.

On 19 January 1998, foreign minister Ali Alatas sworn him as the consul general to Jeddah, with responsibility over managing the flow of hajj and umrah pilgrimage as well as Indonesia's presence in the Organisation of Islamic Cooperation. After two years in that position, he was then appointed as the head of the agency for policy research and development on 17 July 2000. In his capacity, he led various high-level delegations, including the OIC Ministerial Conference in Bamako, the Pacific Island Forum Summit in Nauru, and border committee meetings in East Timor and Papua New Guinea.

Jusuf was sworn in as ambassador to the Netherlands on 30 September 2002. He arrived on 3 November and presented his credentials to Queen Beatrix of the Netherlands on 4 December 2002. During his tenure, Jusuf conducted engagements with the secessionist Republic of South Maluku movement and met with its representatives. His ambassadorial term ended on 9 November 2005.

== Personal life ==
Mohammad Jusuf is married to Magdalena Jusuf and has two children.
