= Dadang Sukandar =

Indonesian diplomat (1936–2019)

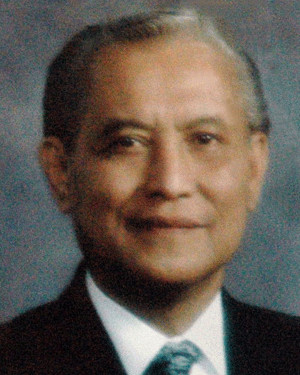

Ambassador of Indonesia to Zimbabwe
- In office 2001–2004
- President: Abdurrahman Wahid; Megawati Sukarnoputri
- Preceded by: Syaiful Amanullah
- Succeeded by: Hupudio Supardi

Ambassador of Indonesia to France
- In office 17 February 1999 – 31 May 2001
- President: B. J. Habibie; Abdurrahman Wahid
- Preceded by: Satrio Budihardjo Joedono
- Succeeded by: Adian Silalahi

Director General of Protocol and Consular Affairs
- In office 23 May 1995 – 28 May 1999
- President: Suharto; B. J. Habibie
- Minister: Ali Alatas
- Preceded by: Abdul Irsan
- Succeeded by: Rachmat Ranuwijaya

Ambassador of Indonesia to Ethiopia
- In office 22 July 1991 – 3 March 1995
- President: Suharto
- Preceded by: Mochtar M. Thajeb
- Succeeded by: Rochsjad Dahlan

Personal details
- Born: 3 April 1936 Bogor, West Java, Dutch East Indies
- Died: 1 December 2019 (aged 83) South Jakarta, Jakarta, Indonesia
- Children: 4
- Education: Gadjah Mada University (Drs.); Fletcher School of Law and Diplomacy (M.A.)
- Occupation: Diplomat

Dadang Sukandar (3 April 1936 – 1 December 2019) was an Indonesian career diplomat who has served as Indonesia's ambassador to different countries. He was Indonesia's ambassador to Ethiopia from 1991 to 1995, to France from 1999 to 2001, and to Zimbabwe from 2001 to 2004. Dadang's last domestic assignment was as director general of protocol and consular affairs from 1995 to 1999.

== Early life and education ==
Dadang was born on 3 April 1936 in Bogor. He received his doctorandus from the Gadjah Mada University and his master's degree from the Fletcher School of Law and Diplomacy. Dadang, who is married and has four children, is a Muslim.

== Diplomatic career ==
Dadang's first overseas assignment was at the embassy in Peking, where he took on duties as the cultural attaché with the diplomatic rank of third secretary. In a 1965 report by the association of Indonesian student in China, Dadang was accused of neglecting Indonesian students facing standardized tests and "never sincerely cooperated with the [student association] during his whole tour of duty in Peking." Dadang was recalled a few months before 30 September Movement.

Throughout his career, Dadang's domestic posting was mostly in the directorate of foreign economic relations. He was posted in charge of economic affairs at the embassy in Washington sometime between 1976 and 1977. By the time he reached the rank of counsellor, on 24 March 1980 Dadang began his duties at the embassy in Brussels, which at that time was accredited to both Belgium and the European Economic Community. He then became the chief of eocnomic, social, and cultural research in the foreign department's research and development agency, before undergoing a tour of duty abroad as the deputy chief of mission at the embassy in Washington (1987 – 1988) and in Vienna (1988 – 1991).

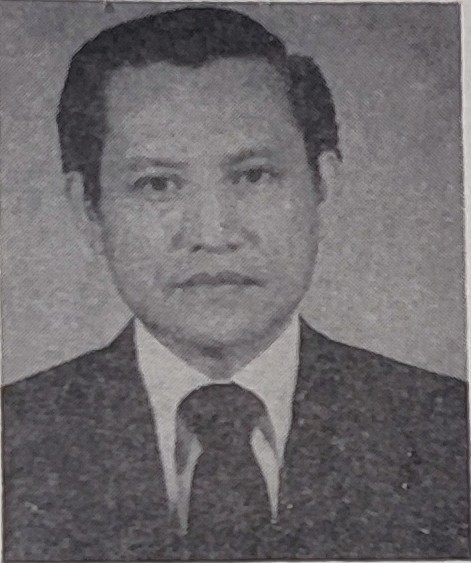
Dadang Sukandar as ambassador to Ethiopia.

Dadang was sworn in as Indonesia's ambassador to Ethiopia on 22 July 1991. He began his duties on 3 October 1991 and served until 3 March 1995. During his tenure, Indonesia began exporting condoms to the country as a way to tackle the overproduction in the country. After his posting in Ethiopia, he was recalled and on 23 May 1995 became the foreign department's director general for protocol and consular affairs. As his post entailed him dual hatted duties as the chief of state protocol, he had to accompany president Suharto for visits abroad and ensure a proper engagement with foreign stakeholders.

On one occasion, Dadang accompanied Suharto during his visit to Canada as part of APEC Canada 1997. In light of the intensive protests from the University of British Columbia against Suharto's policies in East Timor, and motivated by the desire to satisfy Suharto, the local police took harsh measures and arrested dozens of protesters. Dadang later thanked the Canadian authorities for their actions via the embassy in Jakarta, stating that "My President was very pleased," and that "Canada had promised to ensure safety and comfort and you lived up to your word completely". Dadang stepped down from his director general position on 28 May 1999.

From protocol duties, Dadang was promoted to the prestigious assignment of Indonesia's ambassador to France, for whom he was sworn in on 17 February 1999. He began his duties on 3 June and presented his credentials to president Jacques Chirac on 10 September. As ambassador, he represented the government of Indonesia, along with finance minister Boediono in Consultative Group on Indonesia meetings.

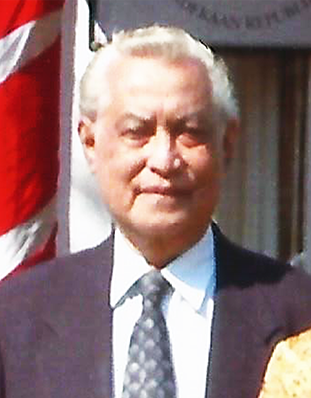
Dadang as ambassador in Zimbabwe.

Dadang's tenure in France ended on 31 May 2001, and was transferred as ambassador to Zimbabwe. On 27 July 2001, Dadang presented his credentials to president Robert Mugabe, where he pledged to improve bilateral trade relations. Dadang ended his term, along with his retirement from the diplomatic service, in 2004. He died at the Tebet Hospital in South Jakarta on the night of 1 September 2019.
