= Adian Silalahi =

Indonesian diplomat (1942–2018)

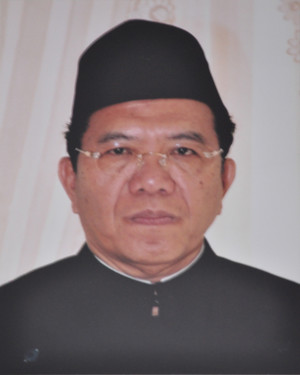

Ambassador of Indonesia to France
- In office 21 May 2001 – 31 July 2004
- President: Abdurrahman Wahid; Megawati Sukarnoputri
- Preceded by: Dadang Sukandar
- Succeeded by: Arizal Effendi

Director General of ASEAN Cooperation
- In office May 2000 – 18 June 2001; Acting until 17 July 2000
- Minister: Alwi Shihab
- Preceded by: Witjaksana Soegarda
- Succeeded by: Abdurrachman Mattalitti

Head of the Agency for Policy Research and Development
- In office 4 January 1999 – 17 July 2000
- Minister: Ali Alatas; Alwi Shihab
- Preceded by: Johan Syahperi Saleh
- Succeeded by: Mohammad Jusuf

Ambassador of Indonesia to Brazil and Peru
- In office 30 August 1995 – 1998
- President: Suharto; B. J. Habibie
- Preceded by: Rhousdy Soeriaatmadja
- Succeeded by: Sutadi Djajakusuma

Personal details
- Born: November 30, 1942 Silalahi, North Sumatra, Indonesia
- Died: November 20, 2018 (aged 75) Jakarta, Indonesia
- Education: University of Indonesia (Drs.)
- Awards: Order of the Southern Cross (Grand Cross); Bintang Jasa Utama

Adian Silalahi (30 November 1942 – 20 November 2018) was an Indonesian career diplomat who served twice as Indonesia's ambassador. He was ambassador to Brazil from 1995 to 1998 and to France from 2001 until 2014. Between his two ambassadorial terms, he served two brief terms as Head of the Agency for Policy Research and Development and Director General of ASEAN Cooperation.

== Early life and education ==
Adian Silalahi was born on 30 November 1942 in Silalahi, a small village in North Tapanuli, North Sumatra. He received his bachelor's degree in development economics in 1968 from the University of Indonesia.

== Diplomatic career ==
Adian began his diplomatic career in 1967, initially serving within the directorate general of foreign economic relations. His inaugural overseas posting was at the embassy in Washington D.C., where he interned with the rank of attaché in 1969 before being promoted to the rank of secretary in 1973. Upon returning to the foreign ministry headquarters, Silalahi was put in the subdirectorate for monetary affairs and international trade until 1976. He then went for an overseas posting at the embassy in Vienna for four years until 1980, before returning for reassignment at the directorate for regional economic cooperation from 1980 to 1983.

Adian served at the embassy in Bangkok with the diplomatic rank of counsellor from 1983 to 1987. He then took up posting as a deputy director within the directorate of multilateral economic cooperation from 1987 to 1989 before undergoing a two-year assignment at the economic section of Indonesia's mission to the United Nations in New York with the diplomatic rank of minister counsellor until 1991. From 1991 to 1993, Adian was promoted as the director of multilateral economic cooperation. In his capacity as director, Adian represented Indonesia in international conferences such as the Earth and Environment Summit in Rio in 1992), the Non-Aligned Movement Summit in Jakarta in 1992, and the G-15 Summit in Caracas in 1993.

By mid-1993, Adian was promoted once again to the rank of ambassador, this time as the deputy permanent representative of Indonesia's mission in Geneva. On 30 August 1995, Adian was appointed as ambassador to Brazil, with concurrent accreditation to Peru. He presented his credentials to the president of Brazil Fernando Henrique Cardoso on 14 November. During his tenure, Adian authored an article defending Indonesia's annexation of Timor Leste, claiming that the move resulted in a significant development and prosperity for the local populace. At the end of his term, in 1998 Adian received the Grand Cross of the Order of the Southern Cross.

On 4 January 1999, Adian was appointed as the chief of the foreign department's agency for policy research and development. He received the Star of Service, 1st class, eight months into his office on 13 August that year. He also became a member of the National Research Council and was appointed to lead the Indonesian Council on World Affairs (ICWA), formerly a discussion group for senior diplomats, as executive director. He was in the role for a year and a half, as on 17 July 2000 he was appointed as the director general of ASEAN cooperation, having previously been appointed to the position in a provisional capacity a month prior. His first major task was managing Indonesia's diplomatic presence in the annual ASEAN Ministerial Meeting, which was held a week after his swearing in. He stated that the meeting would focus on people-to-people issues and that Indonesia would be more open and flexib on discussions regarding domestic issues as compared to previous ASEAN meetings. In February 2001, Adian alongside with China's vice foreign minister Wang Yi led the 3rd meeting of the China-ASEAN Joint Cooperation Committee.

Adian received his second ambassadorial posting as envoy to France on 21 May 2001. He resigned as ASEAN cooperation director general on 18 June and presented his credentials to president Jacques Chirac on 6 July 2001. Shortly upon assuming office, Adian visited Bonneville, Haute-Savoie, to discuss the possibility of extradition of Michaël Blanc, who was sentenced to life imprisonment for drug-related offense, with his family. Adian was welcomed with a formal reception and luncheon at one of the town's finest restaurant in hopes of a breakthrough in the negotiation. In April 2002, Adian alongside with finance minister Boediono negotiated Indonesia's debts with creditor countries of the Paris Club. Adian vacated his position on 31 July 2004 and was replaced in a provisional capacity by his deputy, Lucia Rustam. In his retirement, Adian became the advisor of the Lake Toba Lovers Foundation.

== Personal life ==
Adian was married to Rismaya Silalahi and has three children. Adian died at the Persahabatan Indah Hospital in South Jakarta on the afternoon of 20 November 2018.
