= Andre Omer Siregar =

Indonesian diplomat (1974–2026)

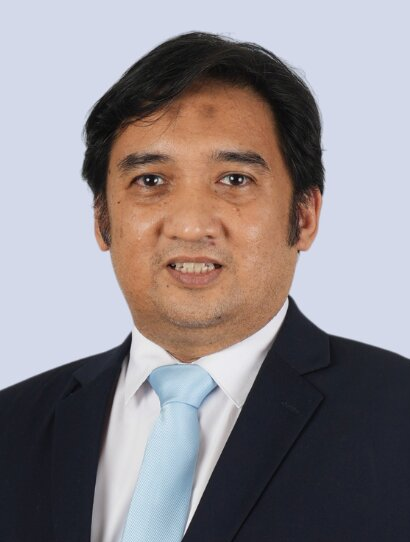

Deputy for Investment Cooperation
- In office 27 March 2026 – 5 July 2026
- Preceded by: Tirta Nugraha Mursitama

Personal details
- Born: 1 July 1974
- Died: 5 July 2026 (aged 52) Jakarta, Indonesia
- Spouse: Eurika Putri Anindhita
- Children: 4
- Parent: Ibnu Ash Djamil Siregar (father)
- Relatives: Adam Malik (grand-uncle)
- Education: Victoria University of Wellington (BA); University of Indonesia (M.Si.); Monash University (MA); Charles Darwin University (Ph.D.)

Andre Omer Siregar (1 July 1974 – 5 July 2026) was an Indonesian career diplomat who served as deputy for investment cooperation in the investment ministry from March 2026 until his death in July of the same year. Before his assignment in the foreign ministry, Andre served as consul in Darwin from 2015 to 2017 and consul general in Houston from 2021 to 2024. Between his two consular tenures, Andre was the director of Asia, Pacific, and Africa intracooperation and intercooperation.

== Early life and education ==
Born on 1 July 1974 as the son of former ambassador to Yemen Ibnu Ash Djamil Siregar and grand nephew of future vice president Adam Malik, Andre followed his father's assignments in London, Sydney, Wellington, and Sanaa. He received his bachelor's degree in economics from Victoria University of Wellington in 1994 and later studied locally at the University of Indonesia, receiving his master's degree in 1999. In 2001, he earned his master's in diplomacy and trade from Monash University. He received his PhD from the Asia Pacific College of Business & Law, Charles Darwin University in 2019, with Prof. David Price advising his research on Indonesia's Global Maritime Fulcrum vision and Indo-Pacific agenda.

== Diplomatic career ==
Andre's professional career began in the private sector at Procter & Gamble Indonesia, marketing the Rejoice shampoo for two years. He credited the company for solidifying his understanding of American corporate culture, an experience that proved to be valuable during his tenure as consul general. He initially refused to follow his father's footsteps in diplomacy, although he later switched his mind in light of the-then ongoing reform movement in May 1998. He applied for the foreign department—to his father's surprise—with an essay suggesting a foreign policy for escaping the 1998 Asian economic crisis based on macro and microeconomic theory. His essay impressed the-then foreign department's secretary general Abdul Irsan and he was accepted on the same year.

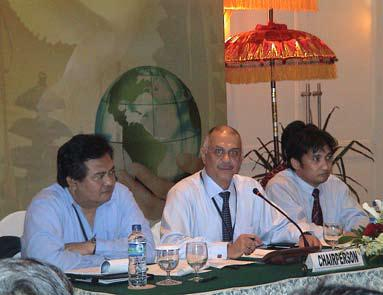
Andre (right) at the Bali Democracy Forum in 2008

His first diplomatic task was in 1999 when he was assigned to East Timor as an observer in the popular consultation process for a few months. He then became the alternate interpreter for president Megawati Soekarnoputri during a meeting with Australian Prime Minister John Howard regarding Australia's involvement in Iraq. His performance was well-received by senior officials, including then-Coordinating Minister for Politics, Law, and Security Affairs, Susilo Bambang Yudhoyono (SBY).

=== UN assignment ===
He then worked in the UN as an interpreter for the UN court hearings, translating two-way conversations for many hours. From January 2004 to January 2008, Andre was assigned to the permanent mission in New York with the rank of third secretary, where he was involved in ECOSOC, the 2nd and 3rd Committees of the UN General Assembly, and the UN Security Council, addressing agendas such as Rwanda and the DR Congo. He also handled issues such as the Bali Process on People Smuggling and Trafficking in Persons in 2002, humanitarian assistance in the UN General Assembly for the Indian Ocean Tsunami Resolution from 2004 to 2007. Following a brief stint in Washington, D.C., he returned to Indonesia in 2008.

=== Presidential interpreter ===
Following his service in New York, he embarked on a service in the directorate general of multilateral affairs as the chief of financial section from February 2008 to December 2010. SBY, now the president, tapped him as his interpreter on 20 January 2011. He was functionally under the purview of the president's special staff for international relations Teuku Faizasyah. In this capacity, he interpreted for SBY in discussions with world leaders, including U.S. presidents George Bush Jr. and Barack Obama, and other heads of state and government at international forums such as the G20, APEC, ASEAN, and UN Summits. He also served on the review team for humanitarian assistance in Aceh with the President's Delivery Unit for Development Monitoring and Oversight in 2013.

Andre often times misinterpreted SBY's words due to SBY's rapid speech, resulting in him being chastised for errors in his interpretation. On one occasion, in a discussion with the Australian government on Papua migrant matters, SBY emphasized Indonesia's willingness to allow Australia to do whatever was best, but Andre interpreted it to the Australians based on the pre-prepared pointers that SBY wanted the refugees to be returned home. On another occasion, Andre was expelled from the interpreter booth by an irritated SBY during his meeting with Austrian president Heinz Fischer due to a technical error that made Andre's voice inaudible. During a summit involving the Indonesian embassy in Russia, Andre shared his interpreting booth to accommodate two embassy staff members, a move positively received by ambassador Djauhari Oratmangun.

=== Consul in Darwin ===
In late 2014, Andre was appointed consul to Darwin, making him the youngest Indonesian consular chief in Australia at the age of forty. His consular responsibility encompasses Australia's Northern Territory. Andre arrived on 18 December 2014 and made his maiden appearance at the 40th anniversary of Cyclone Tracy. As consul, Andre emphasized the critical diplomatic importance of Darwin due to its proximity to Indonesia's eastern border regions and successfully presented a proposal on enhancing Indonesia-Australia economic diplomacy by synergizing the Northern Territory with Indonesia's eastern provinces. Andre also explored cooperation opportunities through young professional network and maritime linkages between Indonesia and Australia. In 2015, Andre, on behalf of the government, received four purebred Riverine buffalo from the Northern Territory government to Indonesia, which was gifted to increase husbandry productivity and strengthen bilateral relationship.

=== Foreign ministry director ===
After his service in Darwin, Andre was sworn in as director of Asia, Pacific, and Africa intracooperation and intercooperation on 12 January 2018. Andre was involved in Indonesia's presence at various regional multilateral forums such as the Indian Ocean Rim Association and the Asia-Pacific Economic Cooperation. He led the Indonesia delegation to the 8th Bi-Annual IORA Committee of Senior Officials Meeting in July 2018 and the Digital Economy Steering Group (DESG) APEC in July 2020. In 2019, he coordinated a high-level dialogue on Indo-Pacific cooperation in Jakarta.

=== Consul general in Houston ===
Upon concluding his tenure as director, Andre was then sworn in as the consul general in Houston on 7 December 2020. He began his duties in February 2021. In this consular post, he worked on a collaboration between Baylor College of Medicine and BioFarma to develop a Covid-19 vaccine and an agreement between Pertamina and ExxonMobil, while also promoting the G20 agenda in the US, as Indonesia was chairing the forum in 2022. After three years of service, he departed his post in June 2024. He was then reassigned to the 2nd America directorate as a senior diplomat with the rank of minister, where he led the directorate's delegation on several key meeting with foreign stakeholders. In January 2026, Andre became the deputy chairman II of the Association of Indonesian Diplomats.

=== Investment deputy ===
On 27 March 2026, Andre became the deputy for investment cooperation under investment minister Rosan Roeslani, where he was responsible for promoting investment cooperation in multilateral forums within ASEAN, APEC, and OECD. In April, Andre attended the OECD Critical Mineral Forum.

== Death ==
Andre died at the Dr. Cipto Mangunkusumo Hospital on the evening of 5 July 2026, four days after his 52nd birthday, due to an unspecified illness he had suffered for three days. A number of government figures, including SBY's son and coordinating minister for infrastructure Agus Harimurti Yudhoyono, investment minister Rosan Roeslani, and transmigration minister Muhammad Iftitah Sulaiman Suryanagara, paid their condolences at his residence in Jatibening, Bekasi. His body was interred a day after at the Kebon Nanas Public Cemetery in Cipinang Besar, South Jakarta.
