= Rahardjo Jamtomo =

Indonesian diplomat (born 1940)

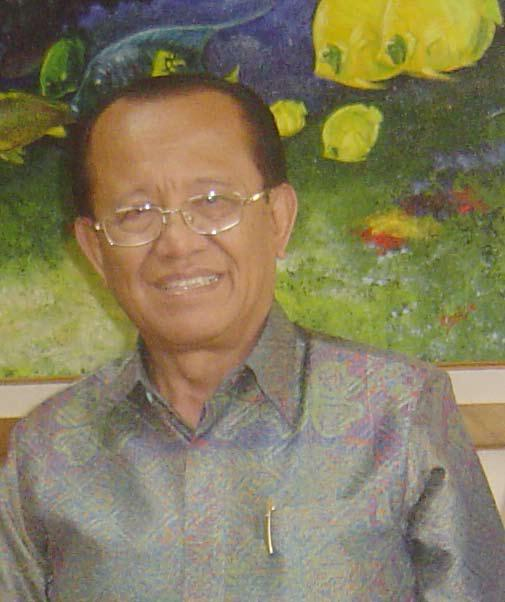

Indonesian Ambassador to Germany
- In office 18 June 2001 – 2004
- President: Abdurrahman Wahid; Megawati Sukarnoputri
- Preceded by: Izhar Ibrahim
- Succeeded by: I Gde Djelantik (acting); Makmur Widodo

Secretary General of the Department of Foreign Affairs
- In office 30 November 1998 – 3 November 2000
- President: B. J. Habibie; Abdurrahman Wahid
- Minister: Ali Alatas; Alwi Shihab
- Preceded by: Abdul Irsan
- Succeeded by: Arizal Effendi

Indonesian Ambassador to the United Kingdom
- In office 16 July 1997 – 30 November 1998
- President: Suharto; B. J. Habibie
- Preceded by: Junus Effendi Habibie
- Succeeded by: Nana Sutresna

Director General of the ASEAN National Secretariat of Indonesia
- In office 25 May 1993 – 9 July 1997
- President: Suharto
- Minister: Ali Alatas
- Preceded by: Agus Tarmidzi
- Succeeded by: Witjaksana Soegarda

Personal details
- Born: August 23, 1940 (age 86)
- Education: University of Indonesia (Drs.)

Rahardjo Jamtomo (born 23 August 1940) is an Indonesian career diplomat who served as ambassador to the United Kingdom from 1997 to 1998 and to Germany from 2001 to 2004. He also served within the foreign department as the director general of Indonesia's ASEAN national secretariat from 1993 to 1997 and as the department's secretary general from 1998 to 2000.

== Early life and education ==
Born on 23 August 1940, Rahardjo studied corporate business (now management) at the University of Indonesia in 1959. He graduated in 1965 with a bachelor's degree.

== Diplomatic career ==
Rahardjo's career in the foreign department was mostly focused on handling international economic cooperation. His first overseas posting was at the permanent mission to the United Nations in New York, where he began his service with the diplomatic rank of third secretary before being promoted to second secretary in 1976. He was then recalled to the foreign ministry, and by 1980 was noted to have took up office as deputy director for economic and social agencies of the United Nations, Non-Aligned Movement and the Organisation of Islamic Cooperation. By then, he had already held the diplomatic rank of counsellor. He was then reassigned to the permanent mission in Geneva, and later London, with responsibilities on economic matters.

=== ASEAN role ===
In 1987, Rahardjo was appointed to head the economic bureau of Indonesia's ASEAN national secretariat in an acting capacity. He was permanently appointed to the position shortly afterwards. During his tenure, Rahardjo urged ASEAN countries to intensify economic cooperation with partner countries without any political ties. He returned to Geneva in early 1991 as the deputy permanent representative, holding the diplomatic rank of ambassador. He led diplomatic efforts in the negotiations for Uruguay Round, which he described as "the art of impossible".

On 25 May 1993, Rahardjo became the director general of Indonesia's ASEAN national secretariat. He was responsible for directing Indonesia's 1996 ASEAN chairmanship, which saw Vietnam's further integration into ASEAN and the admission of Myanmar as an observer. Jamtomo also urged Indonesia's foreign minister, Ali Alatas, to accelerate the implementation of ASEAN Free Trade Area. However, negotiations on the issue stalled due to disagreements regarding the reduction of agriculture produce tariffs, which Jamtomo argued "should not be exaggerated" as it is only a small percentage of the cumulative trade between ASEAN countries.

=== Ambassador ===
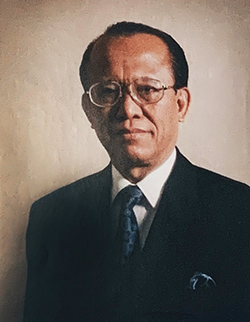
Rahadjo Jamtomo as ambassador to the United Kingdom.

Rahardjo stepped down from his leadership of Indonesia's ASEAN national secretariat on 9 July 1997. Exactly a week later, on 16 July he was sworn in as ambassador to the United Kingdom, and presented his credentials to Queen Elizabeth II on 11 November. Rahardjo's appointment occurred amidst a national financial crisis, with the embassy assisting the United Kingdom government and private companies in formulating a new system for aid to Indonesia.

After a year of service, on 30 November 1998 he was recalled to take up office as the foreign department's secretary general. He relinquished his secretary general post on 3 November 2000 for him to be nominated as the ambassador to Germany. After passing an assessment by the House of Representatives on 25 January 2001—the first of its kind in Indonesia's history—Rahardjo was sworn in by vice president Megawati Sukarnoputri on 18 June. He arrived in Berlin on 6 August and began his duties with a presentation of credentials to president Johannes Rau on 26 September. His term ended in 2004 and he joined the Indonesian Chamber of Commerce and Industry after his retirement as its executive director. Rahardjo is responsible to direct the work of the secretariat and working closely with its leadership in implementing policies and programs. He also encouraged the chamber's branch secretariat to comply with international standards to improve service to its members.
