= Slamet Suyata Sastramihardja =

Indonesian diplomat

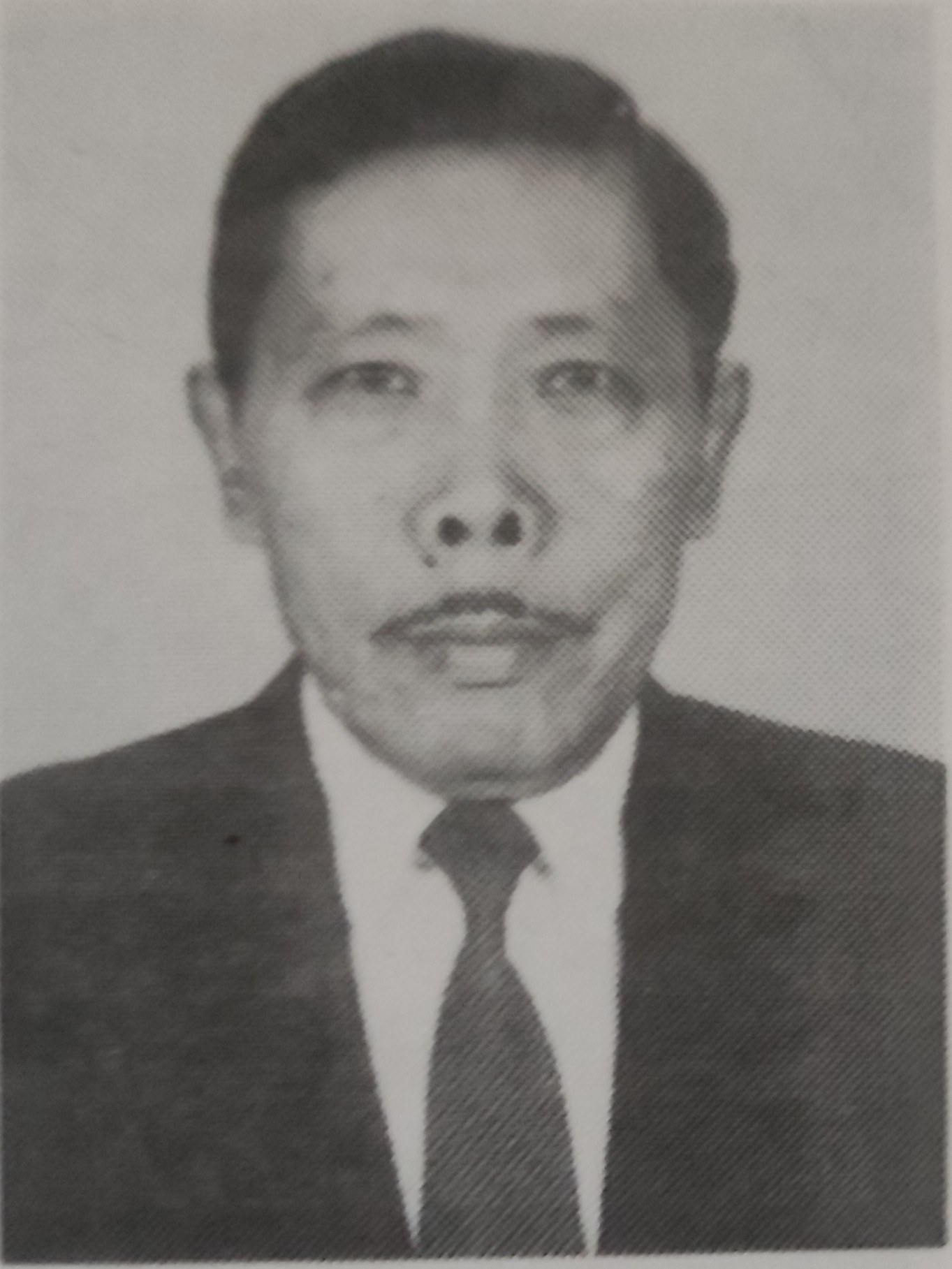

Chargé d'affaires en pied to Madagascar
- In office 10 April 1993 – 1996

Personal details
- Born: February 20, 1932 (age 94) Banyumas, Central Java, Dutch East Indies
- Spouse: Sudiati
- Children: 2
- Education: Foreign Service Academy

Slamet Suyata Sastramihardja (born 20 February 1932) is an Indonesian diplomat who was the chargé d'affaires en pied to Madagascar from 1993 until 1996. Prior to his appointment, he had served in various overseas and domestic postings.

== Early life and education ==
Slamet was born on 20 February 1932 in Banyumas, Central Java. He entered the Foreign Service Academy in 1953 and graduated three years later in 1956. Slamet, who is a Muslim, is married to Sudiati and has two sons.

== Career ==
Slamet worked in the industrial office of the economic ministry in the midst of studies from 1954 to 1957. He entered the foreign ministry in 1957 and by 1962 was posted to the embassy in Moscow, then capital of the Soviet Union, as an attaché. He was promoted shortly later to third secretary. In January 1966, Slamet was part of a five-person team responsible for collecting statements of support for President Sukarno from Indonesian citizens living in the Soviet Union.

By 1978, Slamet was assigned to the embassy in Manila with the rank of first secretary, and in 1980 was transferred to the embassy in Damascus, Iraq, where he received another promotion to the rank of counsellor. Between 1982 and 1986, Slamet was appointed as deputy director in the America directorate, and later the Africa and Middle East directorate. He completed his senior diplomatic education in 1984. In 1986 he was sent for a three-year stint as head of political section of the embassy in Seoul with the rank of minister counsellor. He returned in 1989 for an assignment as the head of administrative section within the directorate of protocol. On 10 April 1993, foreign minister Ali Alatas installed him as chargé d'affaires en pied to Madagascar. As of June 1996, Slamet still retained his position in Madagascar.
