= Niniek =

Niniek is a feminine given name. Notable people with this name include:

- Niniek L. Karim (born 1949), Indonesian actress
- Niniek Kun Naryatie (born 1957), Indonesian diplomat
