= Nining Suningsih Rochadiat =

Indonesian diplomat (born 1949)

Ambassador of Indonesia to Ukraine, Armenia, and Georgia
- In office 30 January 2009 – September 2012
- President: Susilo Bambang Yudhoyono
- Preceded by: Albertus Emanuel Alexander Laturiuw
- Succeeded by: Niniek Kun Naryatie

Personal details
- Born: 23 July 1949 (age 77) Bandung, State of Pasundan
- Spouse: Yayat Rochadiat (m. 1980)
- Children: 3
- Parents: Djahari bin Aksam (father); Sutiamah binti Djumad (mother)
- Education: Padjadjaran University (Dra.); George Washington University (MA)

Nining Suningsih Rochadiat (born 23 July 1949) is an Indonesian diplomat who served as ambassador to Ukraine, Armenia, and Georgia from 2009 to 2012. She had been assigned to diplomatic missions in the United Kingdom and Singapore and had held several domestic positions, with her last appointment being the assistant deputy for non-governmental organizations within the ministry of women empowerment from 2002 to 2008.

== Early life and education ==
Born on 23 July 1949 in Bandung, Nining is the daughter of Djahari bin Aksam, a legal officer for the national police who was the regent of Indramayu from 1975 to 1985, and Sutiamah binti Djumad. During her childhood, Nining moved from place to place following her father's assignment in Indramayu, Kuningan, Cirebon, Bandung, and Jakarta. She completed her high school at the 2nd Bandung State High School. She was friends with, among others, Endriartono Sutarto, who would later go on to become the armed forces commander.

She studied international relations at the Padjadjaran University and graduated with a bachelor's degree in international relations in 1977. While doing research for her final thesis at the foreign department in early 1976, Nining was informed about the job opening in the ministry. One of her friends, who also went with her, filled the job application form on her behalf. She was accepted into the diplomatic service after passing a selection examination. In a 2011 interview, she remarked that Little House on the Prairie inspired her to join the diplomatic service and meet with different kinds of people.

== Diplomatic career ==
=== Junior diplomat ===
Nining was initially assigned as a staff at the political and security section of the general bureau of the foreign department's general secretariat. Nining then underwent basic diplomatic education from 1978 to 1979 and received the best score in an English test held by the British Council. As a recognition of his test results, in 1982 she received her maiden overseas assignment with an internship at the Indonesian embassy in London with the rank of attaché. She was later promoted to the rank of third secretary for political affairs, actively managing Indonesia's presence in London's ASEAN committee and diplomatic forums.

In early 1986, Nining returned to Indonesia for his domestic assignment as the chief of foreign politics task force at Indonesia's ASEAN national secretariat. However, Nining was shocked upon learning that the embassy's administration chief, Hermansyah, demanded her to return her husband's allowances, as her husband did not live with her in London. Although the chief of the state administrative agency J. B. Kristiadi sided with her as he argued that the allowances were part of her rights, the foreign department insisted that it was part of the foreign department's internal regulation.

=== On leave ===
On the same year, Nining's husband was stationed at the Indonesian embassy in Washington, D.C. as assistant to the defence attaché for foreign military sales. Nining decided to take leave from her diplomatic duties and followed her husband. Nining was active within the embassy's women union, taking on the role of secretary and helped prepare food for culinary exhibitions. She also assisted embassy employees for cultural and tourism exhibitions, often switching roles with the embassy's diplomat in charge of the matter, Niniek Kun Naryatie. Outside the embassy, Nining was active in army diplomatic wife club, and spared time on the weekend to pursue her master's degree in international relations and diplomacy at the George Washington University. She graduated in 1989, just several months short before her husband's reassignment for further military education at the Indonesian Army Command and General Staff College.

=== ASEAN and Singapore embassy ===
Nining followed her husband's return to Indonesia in 1990 and returned to active diplomatic duty. She was assigned to the directorate general of ASEAN cooperation for eight years, with her initial responsibility as the head of section for developed countries in the Americas. During this period, she completed her mid-level and senior diplomatic education in 1995 and 1996, respectively. Upon finishing the series of education, she was promoted as the chief of public relations and cooperation within the directorate general.

From Jakarta, in 1999 Nining was appointed as the chief of information, social, and cultural affairs of the embassy in Singapore, serving under ambassador Luhut Binsar Pandjaitan and Johan Syahperi Saleh. Her position entailed her ex officio duties as the supervisor of the Indonesian School in Singapore (Sekolah Indonesia Singapura). Aside from her diplomatic duties, in relation to her husband's position as the army financial director, Nining also chaired the army wife association under his husband's directorate, as well as a board member for foreign relations within the central army wife's association. Her proximity to her husband allowed her to return to Jakarta to exercise her duties within the army wife association with ease, often leading meetings and accompanying her husband during work visits to various parts of Indonesia. At the same time, her husband was given permission by the army chief of staff to visit Nining in Singapore.

Nining's first major challenge, one month into her duty in Singapore, was facing a local staff who has considerable powers in determining information and socio-cultural matters. The local staff had been appointed as the special advisor to the ambassador that overlapped with Nining's own portofolio. Nining advised Luhut to relegate the special advisor under her supervision and adjust the privileges given to the advisor. Luhut swiftly approved the recommendation and the special advisor later resigned upon learning about the decision. Regarding the Indonesian school in Singapore, Nining conducted major renovations on the school building, seeking donations from Singaporean conglomerates to fund the renovations. She also took an unpopular move by dismissing old teachers and recruiting Indonesian fresh graduates.

=== Women empowerment ministry ===
In 2002, Nining returned to Indonesia for her appointment as the assistant deputy for non-governmental organizations within the ministry of women empowerment. She served for six years under two different ministers, Sri Redjeki and Meutia Hatta Swasono. She briefly became the acting deputy for institutional empowerment, which made her directly responsible to the minister, for three months. However, she refused the offer to be appointed permanently for the deputy office, opting instead for an ambassadorial nomination. As assistant deputy, she attended a number of women-related conferences and visited places around Indonesia to handle gender-related violence. During her tenure, the government also allocated an increasing amount of funds for tackling gender-related violence, which she credited to the enactment of the 2004 Law on the Eradication of Domestic Violence.

=== Ambassador to Ukraine, Armenia, and Georgia ===
After repeated recommendations by Sri and Meutia for an ambassadorial posting, on 30 January 2009 Nining was installed as ambassador to Ukraine, with concurrent accreditation to Armenia and Georgia. Shortly following her inauguration, Nining pledged to "strengthen Indonesia's overall relationship" with countries under her jurisdiction and focused on "enhancing economic ties, defense cooperation and promoting Indonesia in Ukraine". Her duties officially began with the presentation of credentials to the president Viktor Yushchenko of Ukraine on 2 April 2009, president Serzh Sargsyan of Armenia on 17 May, and president Mikheil Saakashvili of Georgia on 1 July. In her meeting with Serzh Sargsyan, Serzh urged her to convince the foreign ministry to abstain regarding the Nagorno-Karabakh conflict with Azerbaijan, which she vehemently refused. During her ambassadorial tenure, Nining successfully acquired a new compound for the embassy and lobbied foreign minister Hassan Wirajuda to put Ukraine as one of Indonesia's priority country. She also repeatedly urged Ukraine's foreign minister Kostyantyn Gryshchenko as well as its top officials to appoint an ambassador to Indonesia, as the post had been occupied by chargés d'affaires ad interim since the start of her term. During her farewell calls with the foreign ministries of Armenia and Georgia in September 2012, the two countries pledged to open embassies in Indonesia.

== Personal life ==
Nining is married to Yayat Rochadiat, an Indonesian army brigadier general whose last position was the army financial director. The two were married in a religious ceremony held on 29 June 1980. A bigger ceremony involving saber arch from Yayat's junior were later held on 6 July, with prominent army officers such as the-then army finance director Brigadier General Sumarno and West Java governor Aang Kunaefi in attendance. The couple has two daughters: Annisa Meirita Pattimurani Rochadiat, now assistant professor at the California State University, Stanislaus, Rachma Mutiara Dewi Rochadiat, and a son: Bagus Muhammad Britani Rochadiat.
