= Hupudio Supardi =

Indonesian diplomat (born 1946)

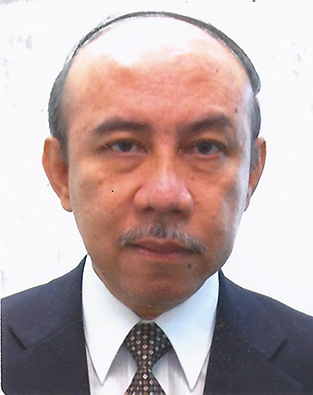

Ambassador of Indonesia to Zimbabwe, Mozambique, and Eswatini
- In office 2004–2008
- President: Megawati Sukarnoputri; Susilo Bambang Yudhoyono
- Preceded by: Dadang Sukandar
- Succeeded by: Eddy Poerwanto

Personal details
- Born: November 9, 1946 (age 79) Malang, East Java, Indonesia
- Spouse: Wayan Aryati
- Children: 2
- Education: University of Indonesia (S.H.)
- Occupation: Diplomat

Hupudio Supardi (born 9 November 1946) is an Indonesian diplomat who served as ambassador to Zimbabwe from 2004 to 2008. Previously, he served as consul general in Osaka and director of foreign socio-cultural relations within the foreign ministry.

Hupudio was born on 9 November 1946 in Malang to a family of diplomats. As a child, he followed his parents' assignment at various countries abroad, including at the Netherlands, Russia, and Switzerland. He then joined the foreign ministry in 1975 while still completing his law education at the University of Indonesia. Hupudio served his first assignment abroad at the embassy in Bern, Switzerland, as the head of the information subsection from 1980 to 1984. He then served as spokesperson (chief of information) at the embassy in Cairo from 1987 to 1991 and at the Washington, D.C. from 1994 to 1998. He began his duties in Washington with the diplomatic rank of counsellor and was shortly promoted to minister counsellor in 1995. He was promoted to become the foreign ministry's director of foreign socio-cultural relations from August 1999 until the post was abolished with the foreign minister's decree on 1 February 2002. He then assumed duties as consul general in Osaka on 28 September 2002.

On 29 July 2004, Hupudio was sworn in as ambassador to Zimbabwe in Harare, with concurrent accreditation to Mozambique and Eswatini. During his tenure, Hupudio expressed his gratitude to the Zimbabwean government for its assistance to the recovery of the 2004 Indian Ocean earthquake and tsunami in Indonesia. He also promoted cultural ties between Indonesia and Zimbabwe through dance troupes and photo exhibitions. Hupudio ended his term in 2008.

Hupudio is married to Wayan Aryati, whom he met during college, and has two daughters from the marriage.
