= Johan Syahperi Saleh =

Indonesian diplomat (born 1947)

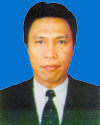

Ambassador of Indonesia to Singapore
- In office 4 September 2000 – 1 August 2002
- President: Abdurrahman Wahid; Megawati Sukarnoputri
- Preceded by: Luhut Binsar Pandjaitan
- Succeeded by: Mochamad Slamet Hidayat

Director General of Foreign Economic Relations
- In office 9 December 1998 – 3 November 2000
- Minister: Ali Alatas; Alwi Shihab
- Preceded by: Soemadi Brotodiningrat
- Succeeded by: Makarim Wibisono

Head of the Agency for Policy Research and Development
- In office 25 August 1997 – 4 January 1999
- Minister: Ali Alatas
- Preceded by: Soendaroe Rachmad
- Succeeded by: Adian Silalahi

Personal details
- Born: May 19, 1947 (age 79) Lampung, Indonesia
- Spouse: Ratu Raja Nurul Rosemary (m. 1978)
- Education: Parahyangan Catholic University (SH); Vrije Universiteit Brussel (LLM, Dr.)

Johan Syahperi Saleh (born 19 May 1947) is an Indonesian diplomat who served as ambassador to Singapore from 2000 until his recall in 2002 due to problems relating his embassy's financial report. Previously, he was the foreign ministry's chief of research and development from 1997 to 1999 and director general of foreign economic relations from 1998 to 2000.

== Early life and education ==
Johan Syahperi Saleh was born in Lampung on May 19, 1947. He studied law at the Parahyangan Catholic University in Bandung, where he chose to specialize in international law. During his college years, Johan was active in student organizations and became a member of the university's student senate from 1969 to 1970. He also led the Presidium for the Indonesian Youth and Student Action Command (KAPPI) in Cirebon from 1966 to 1967 and the student deliberation body from 1969 to 1971. His leadership expanded to a city-wide level when he served as the secretary general of the Cooperation Body for Student Councils and Senates across Bandung from 1971 to 1972. He completed college in 1972 and joined the foreign ministry shortly after.

== Diplomatic career ==
Johan joined the diplomatic service in 1973 and was immediately assigned to the directorate general of politics. After undergoing basic diplomatic training from 1974 to 1975, he continued his studies at the Vrije Universiteit Brussel and received his master of law in international and comparative law, with a focus in international economic law in 1976. He underwent his maiden assignment overseas at the embassy in Bonn, the de facto capital West Germany, in 1978. There, Johan was the junior diplomat in charge of economic affairs with the rank of second secretary. Aside from his diplomatic duties, Johan also attended specialized training sessions conducted by the International Trade Centre, UNCTAD, and GATT in Germany and Geneva between 1979 and 1980 and pursued doctoral studies in international economic law at the Vrije Universiteit Brussel, where he graduated in April 1983.

Upon returning to Indonesia, Johan served as the chief of administration at the directorate of multilateral economic cooperation for a year, a role in which he attended the 1983 Conference on Transfer of Technology in Geneva. He was then appointed as the deputy director for commodities, foodstuffs, and international agriculture affairs at the same directorate for three years until 1987. In this capacity, he represented Indonesia at the FAO conference in Rome in 1985 and participated in several rounds of international negotiations in Geneva regarding cocoa and natural rubber agreements. He also completed his mid-level diplomatic training during this period, which he underwent from 1986 to 1987.

Around this period, Johan was also active in political and youth movements outside his official duties, where he became a member of the youth advisory board of the Central Executive Board of the Indonesian Youth National Committee, the sole umbrella body for youth organizations, and served as the president of the Asian Youth Council from 1985 to 1988, overseeing a regional body of fourteen countries. He also maintained an active presence in Golkar, the government's party, and was part of the party's working group for foreign affairs from 1985 to 1988 and for economic affairs from 1993 to 1998.

Johan was briefly reassigned as the deputy director for energies within the directorate of economic relations with developing countries between 1987 and 1988, before being sent for another round of overseas assignment as economic consul at the consulate general in Los Angeles, California, with the diplomatic rank of counsellor. He officially began his duties on 26 April 1989. During a brief period of the consul general's absence in 1989, Johan held the post in an acting capacity. After several months, he was posted to the permanent mission in Geneva for a similar duty, albeit this time he was already promoted to the diplomatic rank of minister counsellor. During this tenure and the years following, he was a key figure in high-level global forums, attending the 45th and 46th UN General Assemblies, the Group of 15 summit in Caracas in 1991, and various UNCTAD VIII preparatory meetings in Geneva and Pyongyang. He also managed complex negotiations regarding restrictive business practices and the International Sugar Agreement.

Johan returned to Indonesia in 1992 for an appointment as the head of the economics bureau at Indonesia's ASEAN national secretariat until 1995. A year later, he completed his senior diplomatic training. Following a brief two-year stint as the deputy chief of mission at the permanent mission to the European Community in Brussels from 1995 to 1997, on 25 August 1997 he became the chief of the foreign ministry's agency for policy research and development, replacing Soendaroe Rachmad who became ambassador to Italy. In this position, Johan sought ways to improve Indonesia's image in the world and cooperated with the Gadjah Mada University to establish a center for Middle Eastern studies in the university, which aimed to advise the foreign ministry on matters pertraining to the region. Johan also become the chairman of executive council of the Indonesian Council on World Affairs following its establishment in December 1997.

Two years later, on 9 December 1998 Johan became the director general of foreign economic relations and handed over his old post on 4 January 1999. A number of loans and grants were received from Japan and Australia during his tenure, which Johan stated would be used to finance government projects in an attempt to overcome the-then ongoing financial crisis. Johan, on behalf of the central government, accepted a grant from Japan for Indonesia's 2000 population census. By the turn of the millennia, Johan announced Indonesia would also be receiving aid from China, stating that it would be utilized to assist displaced people across the country.

=== Ambassador to Singapore ===
By May 2000, Johan's name had already circulated within the foreign ministry as a strong candidate for ambassador to Singapore. He was formally installed for the position on 4 September and vacated his prior office on 3 November. He presented his credentials to president S. R. Nathan on 9 October on the same year, marking the start of his tenure as ambassador. Johan oversaw the start of the operation of the underwater natural gas pipeline which supplied natural gas to Singapore from the Natuna Islands in Riau. Johan also reinitiated discussions regarding the possibility of supplying water to Singapore and proposed to move the ASEAN headquarters to Batam, near Singapore and Malaysia, which he believed would be more "effective geographically and geopolitically".

Among his staffs, Johan was known to live a luxurious lifestyle, with his wife being described as having an affinity to extravagantly spent her money. Tempo, quoting an anonymou staff, stated that Johan's work quality declined as years go by with him being absent on issues regarding illegal mining for reclamation and terrorism. Johan was later recalled to Indonesia on 1 August 2002 in light of irregularities within the embassy's financial report, with the audit board revealing that the misuse of funds reached more than half of the allocated budget for the embassy. Despite the revelation of the findings, foreign minister Hassan Wirajuda and the embassy's spokeswoman Nining Suningsih Rochadiat denied any corruption from Johan, stating that it was solely due to delay in transferring the funds to the foreign ministry's treasurer.

== Personal life ==
Johan is married to Ratu Raja Nurul Rosemary, who has aristocratic lineage from the Kanoman Sultanate in Cirebon, in 1978. The couple has a daughter.
