= Moeslim Sya'roni =

Indonesian diplomat (born 1930)

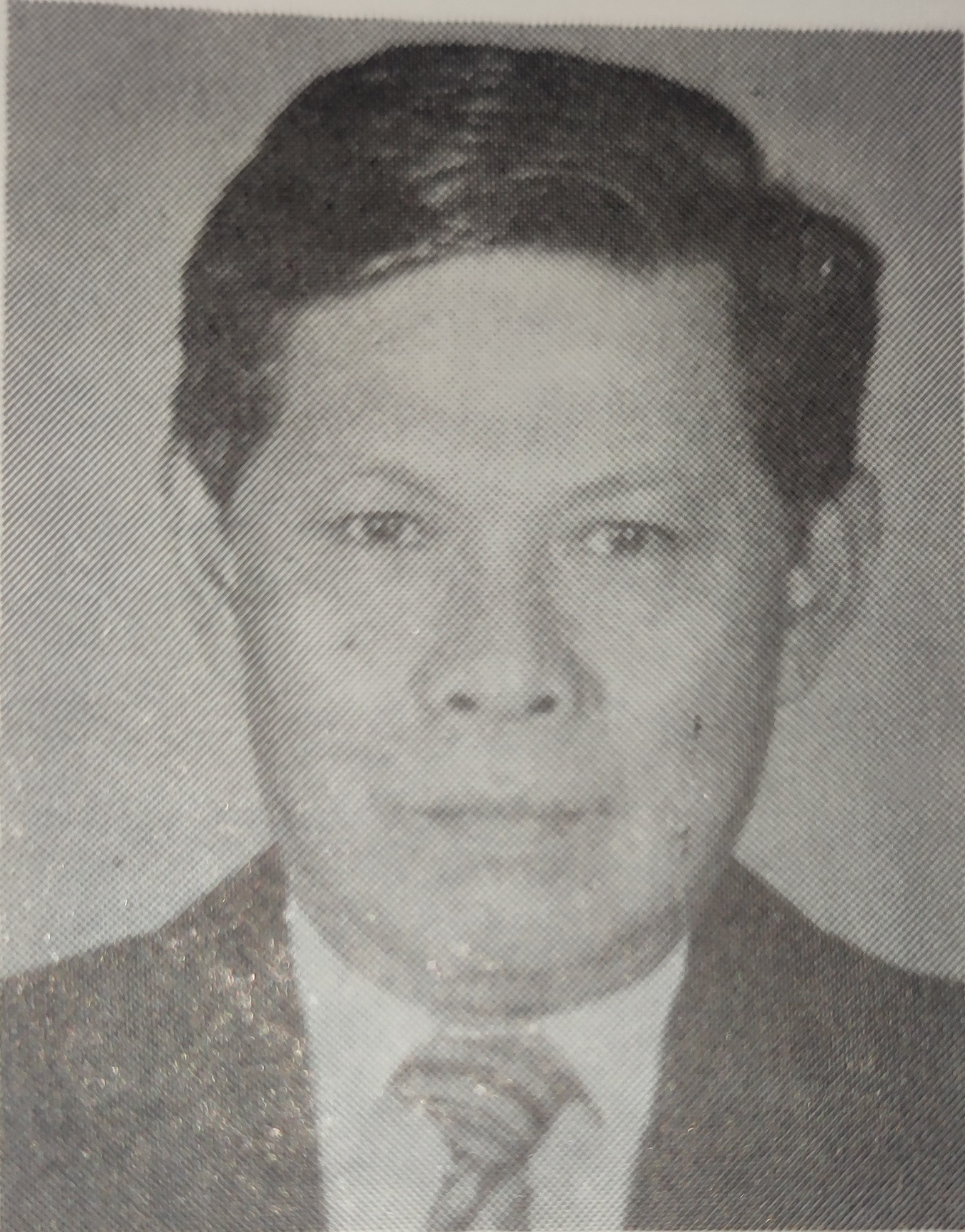

Ambassador of Indonesia to Italy and Malta
- In office 1991–1994
- Preceded by: Radiadi Iskandar
- Succeeded by: Witjaksana Soegarda

Personal details
- Born: May 15, 1930 Klaten, Central Java, Dutch East Indies
- Children: 3
- Education: Foreign Economic Relations Academy

Moeslim Sya'roni (born 15 May 1930) is an Indonesian career diplomat who was ambassador to Italy, with concurrent accreditation to Malta, from 1991 to 1994. Previously, he was the director of developing countries economic relations in the foreign department and consul general in Jeddah.

== Early life, education, and personal life ==
Moeslim Sya'roni was born on May 15, 1930, in Klaten, a regency located in Central Java. Sya'roni graduated from the Foreign Economic Relations Academy in 1956. He completed senior diplomatic education later in his career.

Moeslim is a Muslim. He is married and has three children.

== Diplomatic career ==
Moeslim began his professional career in public service in 1953 when he joined the ministry for economic affairs. After two years of service there, he transitioned into the diplomatic corps by joining the foreign department in 1955. His initial overseas posting came in 1962 when he was assigned to the embassy in Belgrade, serving as second secretary. A decade later, in 1972, he was posted to the embassy in London, where he took on the responsibilities of first secretary. His European service continued in 1975 when he was transferred to Prague to serve as counsellor.

In 1980, Moeslim was elevated to the rank of minister counsellor and stationed at the embassy in Bangkok, Thailand. He remained in East Asia for his next assignment, transferring to Tokyo, Japan, in 1984. Returning to a domestic role within the ministry, Moeslim was appointed as the director of economic relations among developing countries in 1985. Four years later, in 1989, he was sent to Saudi Arabia to serve as the consul general in Jeddah. His diplomatic career culminated in 1991 when he was designated as ambassador to Italy and Malta, with residence in Rome. He served until 1994.
