= Witjaksana Soegarda =

Indonesian diplomat (1939–2010)

Ambassador of Indonesia to Denmark
- In office 25 April 2000 – August 2003
- President: Abdurrahman Wahid; Megawati Sukarnoputri
- Preceded by: Andjar Soedjito Mangkoewijoto
- Succeeded by: Perwitorini Wijono

Director General of the ASEAN National Secretariat
- In office 9 July 1997 – May 2000
- Minister: Ali Alatas; Alwi Shihab
- Preceded by: Rahardjo Jamtomo
- Succeeded by: Adian Silalahi

Ambassador of Indonesia to Italy
- In office 6 February 1995 – 1997
- President: Suharto
- Preceded by: Moeslim Sya'roni
- Succeeded by: Soendaroe Rachmad

Personal details
- Born: 1939
- Died: 25 May 2010 (aged 70–71) Jakarta, Indonesia
- Resting place: Jeruk Purut Cemetery
- Spouse: Soraya Alatas (m. 1986)
- Children: 5
- Parent: Soegarda Poerbakawatja (father)
- Relatives: Ali Alatas (father-in-law); Paripurna P. Sugarda (nephew)
- Occupation: Diplomat

Witjaksana Soegarda (1939 – 25 May 2010) was an Indonesian diplomat who served as ambassador to Italy from 1995 to 1997 and to Denmark from 2000 to 2003. A career diplomat, Witjaksana graduated from the University of Indonesia before joining the diplomatic service. His career in the foreign ministry culminated with his appointment as the director general of the ASEAN national secretariat from 1997 to 2000.

== Personal life and early career ==
Witjaksana was born in 1939 as the ninth of twelve children of Soegarda Poerbakawatja, a professor in pedagogical sciences who served as rector in several universities in Indonesia. Witjaksana received his bachelor's degree in law from the University of Indonesia. He joined the foreign ministry shortly after his graduation, with his first posting at the permanent mission to UN bodies in Geneva. He was entrusted to handle, among others, Indonesia's membership in the General Agreement on Tariffs and Trade and regarding the Fourth Geneva Convention.

Around 1981, Witjaksana, who was assigned to the political section of the permanent mission in New York, met with Soraya Alatas, the eldest daughter of permanent representative Ali Alatas. The two settled down and was married at Ali Alatas's official residence in New York on 13 September 1986. Around this time, Witjaksana, already with the diplomatic rank of first secretary, was reassigned to the foreign ministry as the chief of administration at the directorate of international organizations.

Shortly after Ali became the foreign minister, Witjaksana was appointed as the director of the foreign department's international treaties. During this period, Witjaksana was entrusted as the chief negotiator regarding Indonesia's border in the Timor Gap with Australia. Ali instructed Witjaksana to engage in consultations with Timor professor Herman Johannes, who criticized Indonesia's Timor Gap treaty as he opined that it harmed Indonesia's interests. Following a brief stint as the second-in-charge at the embassy in Austria, Witjaksana returned to the permanent mission in New York as the deputy permanent representative with the diplomatic rank of ambassador. Witjaksana was a vocal opposition on Japan and Germany's membership in the United Nations Security Council (UNSC) and raised concerns regarding the possibility the institutional domination by the two nations. He advocated for an expansion of the UNSC with regards to the post-Cold War constellation of power.

== Ambassador and director-general ==
On 6 February 1995, Witjaksana was sworn in as ambassador to Italy, with concurrent accreditation to Malta and Albania. Witjaksana presented his letters of credence to president Oscar Luigi Scalfaro on 27 April 1995. During his tenure, Witjaksana successfully secured a loan from the International Fund for Agricultural Development for agricultural and farming projects in the eastern half of Indonesia and oversaw President Suharto's state visit to Italy in November 1996.

After two years in office, on 9 July 1997 Witjaksana became the director general of Indonesia's national ASEAN secretariat, replacing Rahardjo Jamtomo who was appointed as ambassador to the United Kingdom. He received the Star of Service, 1st class from the Indonesian government on 13 August 1998. He was in the position until May 2000. He served for another round of overseas assignment as ambassador to Denmark, with concurrent accreditation to Lithuania, on 25 April 2000 until his ambassadorial term ended in August 2003.

After retiring from diplomatic service, Witjaksana joined the Indonesian Chamber of Commerce and Industry as its international relations director. Soegarda died at the age of 71 in Harapan Kita Hospital in North Kota Bambu, Palmerah, on 25 May 2010 due to a lung disease. He was buried at the Jeruk Purut Cemetery on 26 May.
