= Abdurrachman Mattalitti =

Indonesian diplomat (born 1944)

Ambassador of Indonesia to the European Community
- In office 6 August 2003 – 2006
- President: Megawati Sukarnoputri; Susilo Bambang Yudhoyono
- Preceded by: Nasrudin Sumintapura
- Succeeded by: Nadjib Riphat Kesoema

Director General of ASEAN Cooperation
- In office 18 June 2001 – 6 August 2003; Acting until 3 May 2002
- Minister: Alwi Shihab; Hassan Wirajuda
- Preceded by: Adian Silalahi
- Succeeded by: Marty Natalegawa

Director General of Foreign Information and Socio-Cultural Relations
- In office 17 July 2000 – 3 May 2002
- Minister: Alwi Shihab
- Preceded by: Abdul Gani
- Succeeded by: office dissolved

Personal details
- Born: October 17, 1944 (age 82) Surabaya, Indonesia
- Spouse: Oki Andriani Hamsa
- Children: 1
- Education: Pancasila University (S.H.)

Abdurrachman Mattalitti (born 17 October 1944) is an Indonesian diplomat who served as Indonesia's ambassador to the European Community from 2003 to 2006. He previously was the director general of foreign information and socio-cultural relations from 2000 to 2001 and the director general of ASEAN cooperation from 2001 to 2003.

== Early life and education ==
Born in Surabaya on 17 October 1944, Abdurrachman graduated with a bachelor's degree in law from the Pancasila University in 1974.

== Diplomatic career ==
Abdurrachman began his career in diplomacy in 1972, several years before graduating from college. He had undergone intelligence training by the Department of Defense and Security in 1971 and a first-level course on strategic intelligence in 1974. On the same year, in 1974 he undergone basic diplomatic education before being assigned as a section chief at the directorate of multilateral economic cooperation between 1975 and 1979. He then underwent his first overseas assignment at the embassy in Bangkok, where he headed the embassy's economic section from 1979 to 1981. He assisted the ambassador in discharging his ex officio duties as Indonesia's representative to the United Nations Economic and Social Commission for Asia and the Pacific.

From Bangkok, Abdurrachman was stationed for the same position at Indonesia's mission to UN bodies based in Geneva from 1981 to 1984, during which he represented Indonesia in United Nations Conference on Trade and Development meetings. Returning to Jakarta, Abdurrachman served as the deputy director of commodities and foodstock within the directorate of multilateral economic cooperation until 1987. He underwent his mid-level diplomatic education during this period in 1986. He was then sent for a round of overseas assignment as chief of economics at the mission to the European Community in Brussels (1987–1990) and at the embassy in Washington, D.C. (1990–1993). He briefly attended courses organized by the European Institute of Public Administration in Maastricht in 1988 and by the The Asia Foundation in Washington, D.C. in 1990.

Abdurrachman was recalled to the foreign ministry's headquarters to assume duties as the director of investment and financial cooperation within the directorate general of foreign economic cooperation. Early in his term, Abdurrachman attended a senior diplomatic course in 1994. In 1996, he was appointed as the deputy chief of mission of Indonesia's embassy in The Hague, during which he oversaw the development of the framework of cooperation between the two countries. After his duty in the Netherlands ended, he was appointed as special assistant to the foreign minister, where he took part in resolving issues relating to Indonesia's assets within the former East Timor province following its independence.

On 17 July 2000, Abdurrachman became the director general of foreign information and socio-cultural relations in the foreign ministry. His appointment was seen as a departure from common practice as the position was usually held by military officers. During his tenure, cultural agreement was signed between Syria and Indonesia. Abdurrachman received additional duties with his appointment as the acting director general of ASEAN cooperation on 18 June 2001. He also signed, on behalf of Indonesia, the memorandum of understanding on counterterrorism cooperation with Australia in 2002. A year after, the foreign ministry underwent a major restructuring, and Abdurrachman's directorate general was dissolved. He was permanently appointed to lead the directorate general of ASEAN cooperation on 3 May 2002 alongside with other director generals.

A few months upon his appointment as ASEAN cooperation director general, Abdurrachman was nominated by president Megawati Sukarnoputri for ambassador to the European Community. After passing an assessment by the House of Representative's first commission on 20 February 2003, Abdurrachman was sworn in for the position on 6 August 2003 and presented his credentials to President of the European Commission Romano Prodi on 23 October 2003. In 2005, Abdurrachman Mattalitti was put on trial on the Labour Court of Brussels for wrongfully dismissing Maria Pascual, the mission's local staff who took leave to attend to a family legal matter in the Philippines. After Abdurrachman's departure, the mission to the European Community at Brussels Boulevard de la Woluwe was closed and was merged with the embassy to Belgium located at the Avenue de Tervueren. Nadjib Riphat Kesoema, the ambassador to Belgium, succeeded Abdurrachman as he was concurrently accredited to the European Community.

== Personal life ==
Abdurrachman is married to Oki Andriani Hamsa and has a daughter.
