= Esti Andayani =

Indonesian diplomat (born 1957)

Ambassador of Indonesia to Italy, Malta, Cyprus, San Marino, FAO, IFAD, WFP, and UNIDROIT
- In office 13 March 2017 – 30 November 2021
- Preceded by: August Parengkuan
- Succeeded by: Muhammad Prakosa

Director General of Information and Public Diplomacy
- In office 23 April 2014 – 13 March 2017
- Preceded by: Abdurrahman Mohammad Fachir
- Succeeded by: Niniek Kun Naryatie (acting); Cecep Herawan

Ambassador of Indonesia to Norway and Iceland
- In office 20 January 2010 – 2013
- Preceded by: Retno Marsudi
- Succeeded by: Yuwono A. Putranto

Personal details
- Born: 31 January 1957 (age 69) Yogyakarta, Indonesia
- Education: University of Indonesia

R. A. Esti Andayani (born 31 January 1957) is an Indonesian diplomat who has served as ambassador to Norway and Iceland from 2010 to 2013 and ambassador to Italy, with concurrent accreditation to Malta, Cyprus, San Marino, and Food and Agriculture Organization (FAO), the International Fund for Agricultural Development (IFAD), the World Food Programme (WFP), and the International Institute for the Unification of Private Law (UNIDROIT) from 2017 to 2021. Between her ambassadorial terms, she was the director general of information and public diplomacy from 2014 to 2017.

== Early life and education ==
Born on 31 January 1957 in Yogyakarta, Indonesia, Esti completed primary education at the Santa Maria primary school, followed by secondary education at middle and high school at the St. Ursula Catholic School. She studied sociology at University of Indonesia, graduating in 1983 with a bachelor's degree.

== Career ==
Esti joined the foreign service in March 1984 and undertook basic diplomatic education until 1985. She began her career as the acting chief of registration at the foreign department's directorate of diplomatic facilities, serving until 1988. She undertook her first assignment overseas at the consulate general in Bombay as the chief of consular section from 1988 to 1991. Upon her return to Indonesia, she was posted to the ASEAN Economic Bureau, serving as the chief of finance and banking subsection from 1992 to 1994, and briefly as the acting chief of the finance and banking section from March to October 1994.

From 1994 to 1999, she was posted to the economic section of the permanent mission in New York with the rank of second secretary, and later as first secretary. Afterwards, she undertook mid-level diplomatic course in 1999 before being assigned to head the economic cooperation subdirectorate from 1999 to 2002. Around this time, she attended a senior diplomatic course in 2001. She was subsequently appointed to the economic section at the permanent mission in Geneva with the rank of minister counsellor from 2002 to 2004, before serving as the director of commodities and standardization on 1 July 2004. On 28 December 2005, she became the inaugural director of technical cooperation within the foreign department. During her tenure as director of technical cooperation, Esti attended the D-8 Organization for Economic Cooperation summit in Bali in 2006.

On 20 January 2010, Esti was installed as ambassador to Norway, with concurrent accreditation to Iceland. She presented her credentials to King of Norway Harald V on 15 April 2010 and to the President of Iceland Ólafur Ragnar Grímsson on 20 April 2010. During her tenure, she oversaw the logistical arrangements for the visit of president Susilo Bambang Yudhoyono to the Oslo Conference for Climate Change in December 2010, where the President co-chaired the conference with the Norwegian Prime Minister. A significant achievement was securing a written letter of intent for a US$1 billion grant from Norway aimed at Reducing Emissions from Deforestation and Forest Degradation (REDD), following negotiations that extended until 3:00 AM. Under her leadership, the embassy participated in the Reiseliv Oslo exhibition in January 2011, winning the Best Exhibitor Award. Trade relations flourished during this period, with the total volume of trade between Indonesia and Norway increasing by 45% between 2009 and 2010, resulting in a continuing trade surplus for Indonesia.

After her posting in Norway, she returned to Jakarta and was appointed as the director general of information and public diplomacy on 23 April 2014. She was then nominated by President Joko Widodo for ambassador to Italy, with concurrent accreditation to Malta, Cyprus, San Marino, and Food and Agriculture Organization (FAO), the International Fund for Agricultural Development (IFAD), the World Food Programme (WFP), and the International Institute for the Unification of Private Law (UNIDROIT). She passed an assessment by the House of Representative's first commission the next month and was installed on 13 March 2017. She then resigned from her director generalship and handed it over to Niniek Kun Naryatie. She presented her credentials to the President of Italy Sergio Mattarella on 18 May 2017, Director General of the Food and Agriculture Organization José Graziano da Silva on 14 June 2017, President of Malta Marie-Louise Coleiro Preca 21 June 2017, Director General of the World Food Programme David Beasley on 3 August 2017, President of Cyprus Nicos Anastasiades on 6 March 2018, Captains Regent of San Marino Mimma Zavoli and Vanessa D'Ambrosio on 26 July 2018. She ended her tenure on 30 November 2021 and handed over her duties to charge d'affaires ad interim Lefianna Ferdinandus.

As ambassador, she focused on increasing Indonesian exports and attracting Italian investment, setting a goal to boost Indonesian export value to Italy by 50% during her term, a target which saw positive results with a 22.93% rise in 2017. Her strategy included match-making Indonesian and Italian businesses, facilitating the transfer of knowledge to Indonesian small and medium-sized enterprises, and promoting key Indonesian products such as coffee, palm oil, rubber, and false eyelashes, the latter of which sees substantial market demand. She successfully facilitated the first-time export of fresh Indonesian pineapples to Italy in 2017. Furthermore, she actively promoted Indonesia’s creative economy at international events like the Venice Art and Architecture Biennales.

During the COVID-19 pandemic in Italy in early 2020, the embassy established a 24/7 COVID-19 Command Post with a separate hotline, inventoried the Indonesian diaspora, and provided health and food aid packages to citizens and ship crews. She directly oversaw the repatriation of 540 Indonesian cruise ship crew members, including personally accompanying 217 crew departing on a charter flight to Denpasar on 5 April 2020. For Malta, she coordinated with diplomatic networks and the Maltese foreign ministry to secure extended stay permits for seven Indonesian fishing vessel crew whose contracts had expired due to the lockdown.
