= Jonny Sinaga =

Indonesian diplomat (born 1961)

Ambassador of Indonesia to Argentina, Paraguay, and Uruguay
- In office 15 October 2014 – 2017
- President: Joko Widodo
- Preceded by: Nurmala Kartini Sjahrir
- Succeeded by: Niniek Kun Naryatie

Personal details
- Born: December 4, 1961 (age 64) Narumonda, North Sumatra, Indonesia
- Spouse: Nima Sulina Singarimbun (died 2014)
- Relations: Masri Singarimbun (father-in-law)
- Education: University of Indonesia (S.H.); Tulane University School of Law (LL.M.)
- Occupation: Diplomat

Jonny Sinaga (born 4 December 1961) is an Indonesian diplomat who served as ambassador to Argentina from 2014 to 2017, during which he raised public attention in relation to the protests lodged by his staff concerning his leadership, inappropriate behaviour, and the usage of defamatory words. A career foreign service officer, Jonny had served as the chief of the foreign ministry's financial bureau, the director of senior diplomatic education, and deputy chief of mission of the Indonesian embassy in Tokyo.

== Early life and education ==
Jonny was born on 4 December 1961 in Narumonda, a small village located in proximity to Lake Toba in the North Sumatra province. His father was a chemistry teacher, while his mother was a housewife. Due to financial constraints, the family later moved to Medan. Jonny completed his basic education in Narumonda and maintained academic record at the top of the class from elementary to high school. During his childhood, he helped his parents obtain income by farming, plowing fields, and gathering firewood.

After finishing high school in 1981, Jonny convinced his parents to allow him to pursue college studies, even though his parents did not have enough money to fund his studies. He applied and was accepted to study law at the University of Indonesia, the Polytechnic of State Finance STAN, and the Statistical Academy. He briefly studied in the latter two institutions before deciding to pursue full-time studies at the University of Indonesia and graduating in 1987. During his college studies, he interned at the South Jakarta public court. He received his master's degree from the Tulane University School of Law in New Orleans in 1992.

== Diplomatic career ==
Jonny began his career as a foreign service officer in 1987, serving as the chief of international trade treaty section within the directorate of international treaties. After receiving his master's degree, from 1993 to 1997 Jonny was assigned to the political section of the embassy in Canberra with the rank of second secretary. He briefly served in East Timor in 1998 during its period of secession from Indonesia. Between 2000 and 2004, Jonny served at the permanent mission to the United Nations in New York, where he was responsible for human rights matters. He then became the deputy director for civil and political rights at the foreign ministry's directorate for human rights from 2005 to 2008, during which he authored a number of opinion pieces on human rights in The Jakarta Post. On behalf of Indonesia, Jonny praised the workings of the United Nations Commission on Human Rights but expressed concerns about the lack of support received from its member states.

On 27 March 2007, Jonny was sworn in as the director of the foreign ministry's senior diplomatic education by foreign minister Hassan Wirajuda. In 2009, the foreign ministry underwent a leadership transition, with Hassan Wirajuda being replaced by Marty Natalegawa. Later that year, the prosecution investigated reports of financial misappropriation in the foreign ministry by gouging travel ticket refunds, which resulted in a loss of over Rp 21,000,000,000. The embezzlement case also implicated the foreign ministry's chief of financial bureau, Ade Wismar Wijaya, who was summarily dismissed in mid February 2010. Jonny, who was a close confidant of Marty, replaced Ade on 22 February 2010.

As the chief of financial bureau, Jonny admitted facing a lot of challenges and pressures in implementing reforms within the foreign ministry's financial system, as he received threats in his attempt to inspect or revise programs within the bureau. He was frequently warned by staffs to not consume foods or beverages in the bureau as there were possibility of it being laced. He also caused fuss for refusing to receive gifts from finance-related officials. Within a span of two years in office, Jonny managed to resolve most of the problems within the bureau and managed to .

By 2012, Jonny was appointed as deputy chief of mission (the second-in-command) of the embassy in Tokyo. On 15 October 2014, Jonny was sworn in as ambassador to Argentina, with concurrent accreditation to Uruguay and Paraguay. He presented his credentials to president Horacio Cartes of Paraguay on 20 April 2015, vice president Amado Boudou of Argentina on 23 April 2015, and president Tabaré Vázquez of Uruguay on 10 March 2016.

On 28 August 2015, staffs within the embassy lodged a complaint to the foreign ministry in the form of a seven-page letter containing twenty-two points of dissatisfaction, which ends with a plead to reevaluate Jonny's performance and to pay a visit to the embassy. Staffs complained about the mental and health pressure faced working under Jonny, Jonny's lack of interaction with Indonesians within his country of jurisdiction and his inappropriate and harsh behavior towards home staff while doing the exact opposite towards local Argentinian staffs working in the embassy. Although initially refusing to confirm the letter's existence, the foreign ministry later confirmed receiving the letter and sent a team to investigate and take action regarding the complaints, with foreign minister Retno Marsudi ensuring that actions have been taken against Jonny in accordance to the ministry's internal mechanism. Jonny denied any wrongdoings and defended his actions as well as his strict and temperamental behavior as necessary for the sake of the national interest. The revelation sparked harsh criticism on Jonny's management of the embassy, with foreign relations committee chairman Mahfud Sidik demanding an inspection team to directly meet with the ambassador and the staff, while vice chairman Tantowi Yahya highlighted the lack of psychological evaluation in the assessment process for ambassadorial appointments.

== Later life ==
After vacating his position, Jonny was assigned as a senior diplomat within the foreign ministry's second America directorate. In 2018, he led a group of diplomats visiting the Lampung provincial government to discuss about potential exports from the province to South American countries. After his retirement, he initiated the establishment of the Indonesian Export Increase Group. He also taught international law at the Christian University of Indonesia and worked as a senior counsel for the Jakarta based Nah’R Murdono law office.

== Personal life ==
Jonny was married to Nima Sulina Singarimbun, daughter of Gadjah Mada University anthropology professor Masri Singarimbun. Nima died on 12 August 2014 due to terminal lung cancer, which she was diagnosed with four months before his death.
