= J.B.Soedarmanto Kadarisman =

Indonesian diplomat

J.B. Soedarmanto Kadarisman
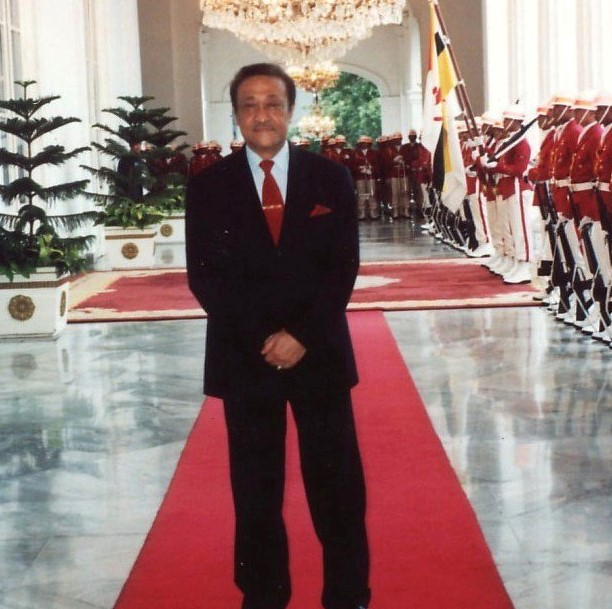
- Kadarisman as the Head of State Protocol

Director General of Protocol and Consular Affairs
- In office 20 July 1988 – 24 December 1993
- President: Suharto
- Preceded by: Alex Rumamby
- Succeeded by: Abdul Irsan

Ambassador of Indonesia to the Netherlands
- In office 4 February 1994 – 4 October 1998
- President: Suharto; B. J. Habibie
- Preceded by: Bintoro Tjokroamidjojo
- Succeeded by: Abdul Irsan

Ambassador of Indonesia to Argentina
- In office 14 March 1987 – 1988
- President: Suharto

Personal details
- Born: Johannes Berchmans Soedarmanto Kadarisman; 8 May 1930 Ambarawa, Central Java, Dutch East Indies
- Died: 10 December 2012 (aged 82) Jakarta, Indonesia
- Spouse: Maria Joan d’Arc Haroeri Srie Soewarni Kadarisman
- Children: 4

J.B Soedarmanto Kadarisman (8 May 1930 – 10 December 2012) was an Indonesian diplomat who served as the country's Chief of Protocol in the early 1980s, as ambassador to Argentina from 1987 to 1988, and as ambassador to the Netherlands from 1994 to 1998.

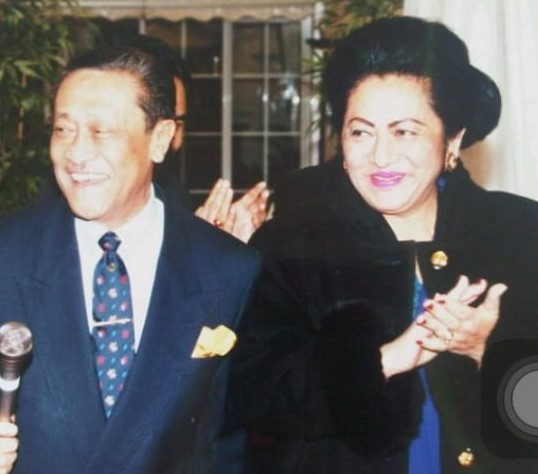
Bersama Ibu Haroeri pada perayaan Natal 1998 Wisma Duta Besar Den Haaq

== Diplomatic career ==
From 1958 to 1961, Kadarisman served as the Third Secretary in the Consulate General of the Republic of Indonesia in Karachi.

1962 to 1965 he was appointed as the Political Function at the Embassy of the Republic of Indonesia, Moscow, USSR. Hence, he temporarily served as the official who handled Indonesian Student Associations at the Soviet Union by that time.

After his second post, he served as a staff at the Kepala Seksi Luar Negri Biro Kepegawaian at the Indonesian Ministry of Foreign Affairs.

From 1976 to 1980 he was assigned as the Minister Counselor at The Indonesian Embassy at Ethiopia, After his third placement, Kadarisman served as Director of Protocol from 1980 to 1983 back at the Ministry of Foreign Affairs.

From 1984 to 1987 Kadarisman was appointed as the Deputy Chief of Mission at the Indonesian Embassy of Indonesia to the Kingdom of Netherlands in the Hague.

In 1987, Kadarisman was appointed to be the Ambassador Extraordinary and Plenipotentiary of Indonesia to Argentina, Paraguay, Uruguay, and Chile. Kadarisman only held office until 1988 and was reassigned back to his homeland to serve as Director-General of protocols and Consular who also served as Chief of Protocol to the Republic of Indonesia during President Suharto in the Sixth Development mCabinet until 1994.

Hence, In 1994 Kadarisman was sent back to represent Indonesia, he was appointed to be the Extraordinary and Plenipotentiary Ambassador to the Kingdom of Netherlands in the Hague until 1998.

== Personal life ==
Kadarisman married Haroeri Sri Soewarni on December 26, 1958. From this marriage, they had four children, two in-laws, and six grandchildren:

1. Sebastianus Sayoga Chandra Angkasa Kadarisman
  - Niken Padmorini Nugroho
    - Michael Abimanyu Wicaksono Kadarisman;
    - Bianca Pinastika Putri Kadarisman;
      - Faiz Naufaldo
    - Alphonsus Bayu Wicaksono Kadarisman.
2. Jachinta Dwiyoga Chandra Kirana Kadarisman
3. Lucia Triyoga Chandra Kartika Kadarisman
4. Elizabeth Chatur Diahyoga Chandra Purnama Kadarisman
  - Aryamir Husein Sulasmoro.
    - Maria Joan d’Arc Kaira Ashanala Sulasmoro;
    - Jachinta Andrea Ashakirana Sulasmoro;
    - Nathaniel Pasha Aryaputra Sulasmoro.

== Honors ==
Kadarisman's achievements did not stop there in 1993 he received the Main Mahaputera Bintang award, he was a career diplomat who received this award in addition to the minister, when he got the award he said in his speech this award was not for himself, but for all the corps of the Department of Foreign Affairs who have worked earnestly for the Republic of Indonesia.

1. Bintang Mahaputera Utama - 1993
