= J. B. Kristiadi =

Indonesian civil servant (1946–2023)

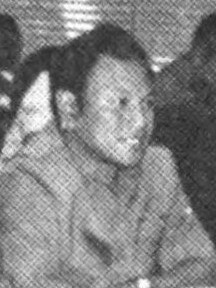
- Kristiadi in 1992

Secretary General of the Department of Finance
- In office 29 March 2005 – 1 November 2006
- Minister: Jusuf Anwar; Sri Mulyani
- Preceded by: Agus Haryanto
- Succeeded by: Mulia Panusunan Nasution

Secretary to the Minister of Communications and Information
- In office 2002 – 2 June 2006
- Minister: Syamsul Mu'arif; Sofyan Djalil
- Preceded by: Unknown
- Succeeded by: Ashwin Sasongko (as Secretary General of the Department of Communications and Information)

Chairman of the State Administrative Agency
- In office 27 June 1990 – July 1998
- President: Suharto; B. J. Habibie
- Preceded by: Bintoro Tjokroamidjojo
- Succeeded by: Mustopadidjaja

Personal details
- Born: 4 May 1946 Surakarta, Central Java, Indonesia
- Died: 21 February 2023 (aged 76) Central Jakarta, Jakarta, Indonesia
- Spouse: Fiona Yuliandria Kristiadi (m. 1976)
- Children: 4
- Parents: B.S. Pudjosukanto (father); Theresia Pudjosukanto (mother)
- Education: University of Indonesia (Drs.); Sorbonne University (Ph.D.)

Johanes Berchmans Kristiadi Pudjosukanto (4 May 1946 – 21 February 2023) was an Indonesian civil servant, academician, and economist who served as the Chairman of the State Administrative Agency from 1990 until 1998, Secretary to the Minister of Communications and Information from 2002 until 2005, and Secretary General of the Department of Finance from 2005 until 2006.

== Early life and education ==
Kristiadi was born in Surakarta on 4 May 1946 as the son of B.S. Pudjosukanto, a teacher in a Dutch school, and Theresia Pudjosukanto. He was the sixth child of his parents' nine children. His parents were known as strict parents and implemented Dutch-style teaching to their children.

Kristiadi's parents moved to Jakarta around three years after giving birth to him. He began his studies at a primary school in Blok Q, Kebayoran Baru. Due to his parents' wealthy background, Kristiadi was the only student in the school to be able to wear shoes. However, he always removed his shoes after arriving at the school, stating that he was "ashamed to be the only one wearing shoes after school". He graduated from elementary school and continued at the Tarakanita Junior High School.

As a child, Kristiadi developed interest in machinery and would sometimes fiddle radios or his mother's sewing machine. He was so interested in natural sciences that after finishing his junior high school, he decided to attend two different high schools, each with different subjects. However, his parents were only able to pay the tuition of only one high school and he was told to leave one of the high schools.

Upon finishing his high school education, Kristiadi attended the University of Indonesia. Kristiadi was actively involved in students protests against Sukarno during that period. Kristiadi graduated with a doctorandus in public administration 1971. He then went to France and undertook postgraduate studies at the Sorbonne University. He obtained his Ph.D in 1979 with summa cum laude . He was appointed as professor in social and political sciences at the Padjadjaran University sometime in the 1990s.

== Career ==
Kristiadi had already been accepted as an employee at the Department of Finance before he graduated from the University of Indonesia. He began to work in the department a year after his graduation. After he returned to Indonesia from France, he was appointed the director of state wealth management. He left the position in 1987 and became the director of budgeting.

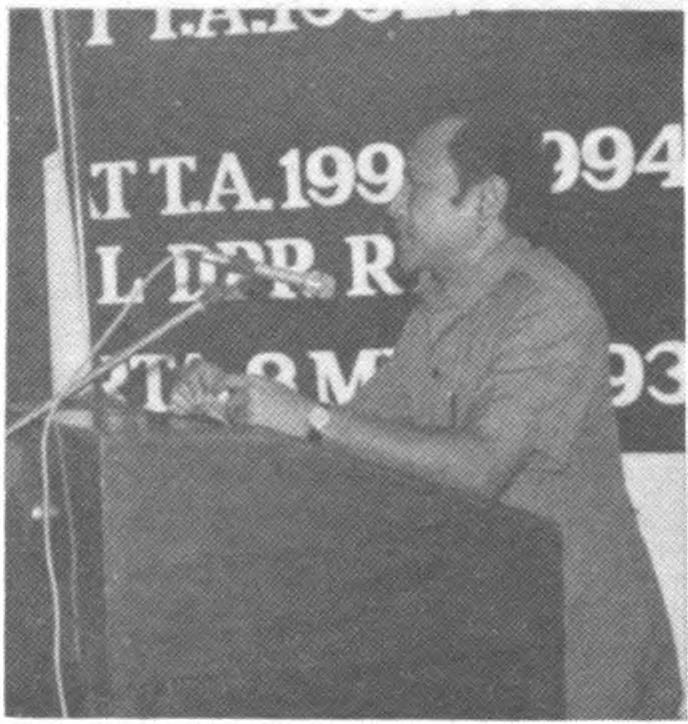
J. B. Kristiadi delivering a speech in front of the People's Representative Council staff

On 27 June 1990, Kristiadi was installed as the Chairman of the State Administrative Agency (LAN, Lembaga Administrasi Negara), replacing Bintoro Tjokroamidjojo who became the ambassador to the Netherlands. Under his leadership, LAN began implementing changes on Indonesia's civil service education system as well as the agency's institute. The central government then issued a decree in 1994 which enforces the role of LAN in Indonesia's civil service education system. In response to this decree, LAN began establishing cooperation with national and international establishments, such as the British Council and the Hasanuddin University.

Several years before the fall of President Suharto, Kristiadi began a gradual implementation on regional autonomy in various regencies. Fifteen regencies were chosen as part of the pilot experiment for the regional autonomy project. He also proposed the privatization of the public sector in Indonesia, which was based on Margaret Thatcher's extensive privatization program.

Kristiadi was replaced by Mustopadidjaja in July 1998 and he became the assistant to the coordinating state minister for the empowerment of state apparatus. The position was later renamed as the state minister of administrative reform and Kristiadi became the minister's deputy for organization and public service. Around this period, Kristiadi was appointed as the deputy chairman of the Y2K task force, a task force established by the Indonesian government to anticipate the year 2000 problem.

Kristiadi became the secretary to the state minister of communication and information—the minister's second-in-command—in 2002. Kristiadi was tasked by the minister to handle matters relating to telematics and the development of the digital information system in Indonesia. He was responsible for the development of voice over internet protocol in Indonesia and for proposing amendments on Indonesia's IT law. He also briefly became the chairman of the Coordinating Team for Indonesian Telematics after the authority of the team was handed over from the president to the state minister of communication and information.

In early 2005, the government enacted a new law which reorganized the structure of the state minister's office of communication and information into a department. As a consequence, the post of secretary to the state minister of communication and information was restructured into the secretary general of the department of communication and information. In accordance to this change, Kristiadi returned to the Department of Finance and became the department's secretary general on 29 March 2005. However, he still retained his old post until a new secretary general of the department of communication and information on 2 June the same year.

Kristiadi served as secretary general for a year and a half, as on 1 November 2006 he was already replaced by Mulia Panusunan Nasution. Despite his very brief term, he served under two different finance ministers, Jusuf Anwar and Sri Mulyani. During Sri Mulyani's term, Kristiadi was entrusted to led the reorganization process of the department, which resulted in the formation of four new directorates. He also led the investigation process of the mismanagement of the Bank Indonesia Liquidity Support funds.

== Later life ==
After retiring from the civil service, Kristiadi worked as a professor in public administration at the University of Indonesia and the Padjajaran University. He became a board member in several companies as well as supervising and leading several education foundation. He also held several non-administrative positions in the government later in his life, such as expert staff to the finance minister from 2009 until 2011, secretary of the Tax and Customs Reform Initiative Team in 2010, and a member of several government selection committees.

== Personal life ==
Kristiadi married Fiona Yuliandria in 1976. The couple had four children.

Kristiadi died on the morning of 21 February 2023 at the Abdi Waluyo Hospital in Central Jakarta. Incumbent finance minister Sri Mulyani delivered her condolences, stating that Kristiadi was her mentor and close friend during her early days as finance minister.
