= Mohammad Hatta (diplomat) =

Indonesian diplomat (1930–2012)

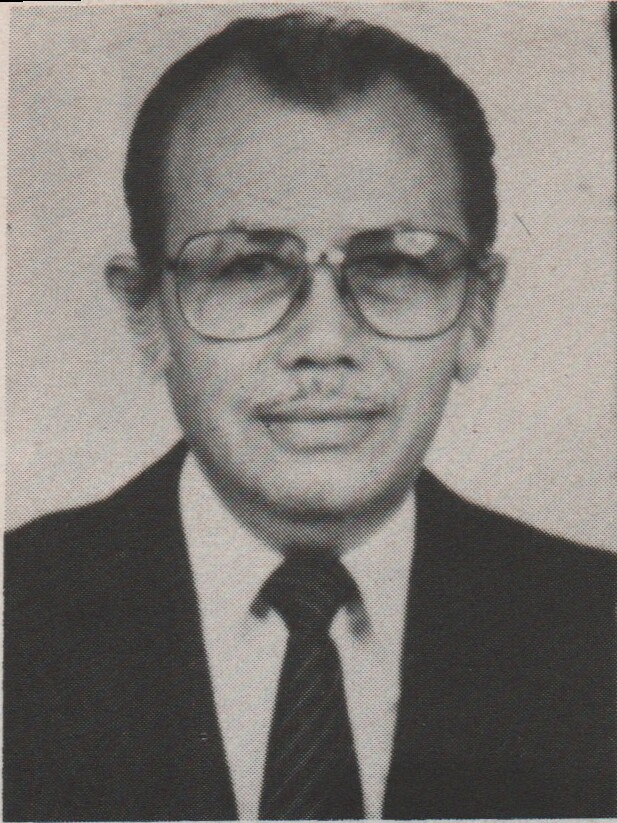

Ambassador of Indonesia to Syria and Cyprus
- In office 17 February 1988 – September 1991
- President: Suharto
- Preceded by: Chalid Mawardi
- Succeeded by: Widodo Atmosutirto

Personal details
- Born: 10 October 1930 Padang, Dutch East Indies
- Died: 24 January 2012 (aged 81)
- Spouse: Farida
- Children: 2
- Education: Foreign Service Academy; Gadjah Mada University (Drs.)

Mohammad Hatta (10 November 1930 – 24 January 2012) was an Indonesian diplomat who served as ambassador to Syria from 1988 to 1991. A career diplomat, Hatta had served in various domestic and overseas posting, including as the foreign department's spokesperson and deputy chief of mission in Tokyo and Canberra.

== Diplomatic career ==
Born in Padang on 10 November 1930, Hatta studied at the Foreign Service Academy from 1951 to 1954. Upon obtaining his doctorandus in international relations from the Gadjah Mada University in 1955, Hatta began his diplomatic duties at the embassy in Norway, where he started off with the diplomatic rank of attaché in 1957. He was promoted to third secretary a year later and served until 1960. Following a four year domestic posting in the foreign ministry, Hatta was sent to the embassy in Mexico with the rank of second secretary in 1964.

Following the 30 September Movement in 1965, Indonesia's ambassador to Cuba Anak Marhaen Hanafi fled from his post to France, and Indonesia's relations to Cuba were downgraded to chargé-level relations. Hatta was transferred to the embassy in Cuba and served as the embassy's chargé d'affaires with the diplomatic rank of first secretary until 1968. He briefly undertook overseas posting at the embassy in Cairo in 1971 before being reassigned to the Hague from 1972 to 1976, all with the diplomatic rank of minister counsellor. During his tenure in the Hague, Hatta took part in Inter-Governmental Group on Indonesia meetings held in Amsterdam and handled terrorist attacks from the Republic of South Maluku movement. He returned to Indonesia as a staff at the directorate for foreign security, before being named as director of foreign information on 17 January 1978, replacing Abdurrahman Gunadirdja.

Following his directorship, Hatta was appointed as the deputy chief of mission at the embassy in Tokyo, and afterwards, Canberra. He served as the director of protocol from 1987 to 1988 before being sworn in as ambassador to Syria on 17 February 1988. Hatta, who is also accredited as Indonesia's first ambassador to Cyprus, presented his credentials to the president of Cyprus George Vassiliou on 28 June that year. He served until September 1991.

== Personal life ==
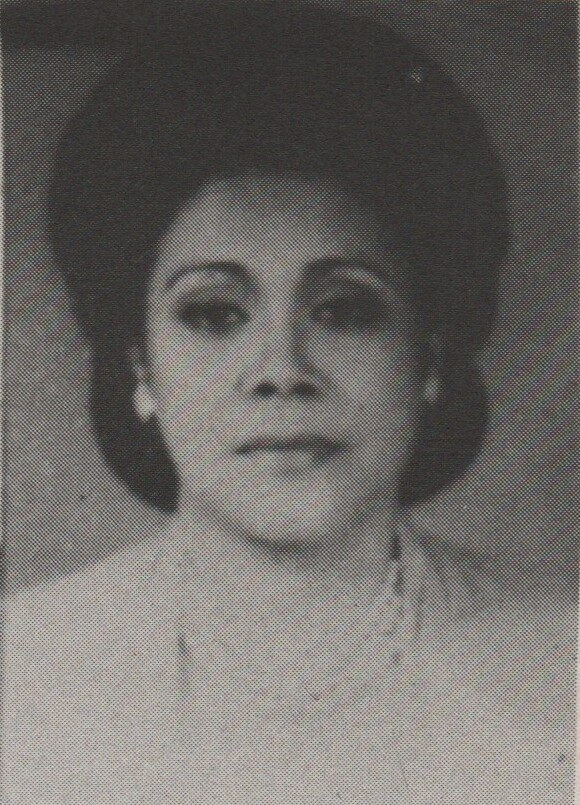
Farida, Mohammad Hatta's wife.

Hatta is married to Farida and has two daughters, Farina and Lucia.

Hatta died on 24 January 2012 and was interred at the Jeruk Purut public cemetery.
