= Niniek Kun Naryatie =

Indonesian diplomat (born 1957)

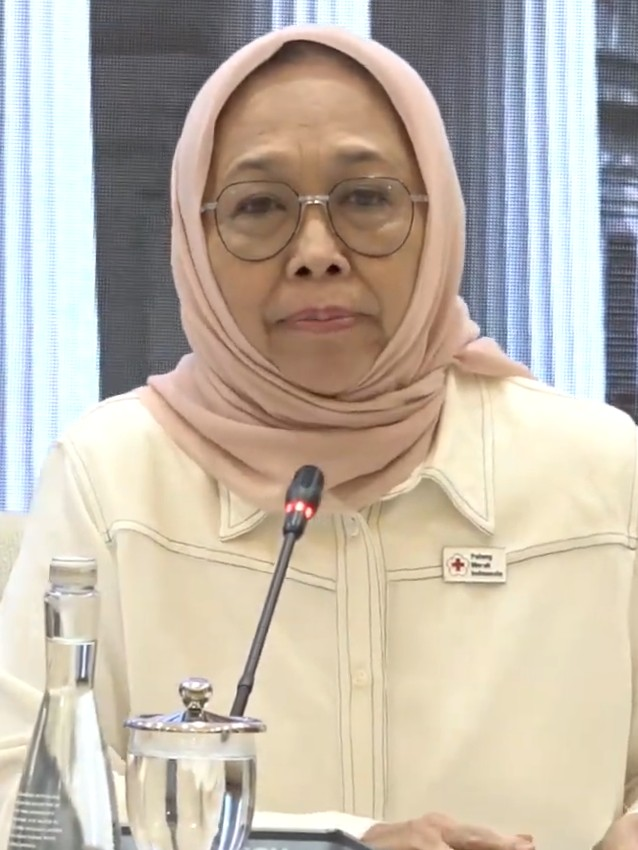

Ambassador of Indonesia to Argentina, Paraguay, and Uruguay
- In office 20 February 2018 – February 2023
- President: Joko Widodo
- Preceded by: Jonny Sinaga
- Succeeded by: Sulaiman Syarif

Director General for Information and Public Diplomacy
- Acting
- In office 13 March 2017 – 15 September 2017
- Preceded by: Esti Andayani
- Succeeded by: Cecep Herawan

Ambassador of Indonesia to Ukraine, Georgia, and Armenia
- In office 3 September 2012 – 2016
- President: Susilo Bambang Yudhoyono; Joko Widodo
- Preceded by: Nining Suningsih Rochadiat
- Succeeded by: Yuddy Chrisnandi

Personal details
- Born: 11 December 1957 (age 68) Surabaya, Indonesia
- Spouse: Sisjugo Tjahjono Siswojo
- Children: 2
- Education: University of Indonesia (Dra.)
- Profession: Diplomat
- Awards: Satyalancana Karya Satya, 3rd Class (2008); Ksatria Bakti Husada (2011); Satyalancana Karya Satya, 2nd Class (2016)

Niniek Kun Naryatie (born 11 December 1957) is an Indonesian retired diplomat who served as ambassador to Argentina, with concurrent accreditation to Paraguay and Uruguay, from 2018 to 2023. Previously, she was the foreign minister's advisor for socio-cultural affairs and Indonesian diaspora empowerment from 2016 to 2017 and as ambassador to Ukraine, with concurrent accreditation to Georgia and Armenia, from 2012 to 2016.

== Early life and education ==
Born in Surabaya, Indonesia, on 11 December 1957, Niniek's father was Koen Djelani, former naval academy governor who had served as assistant defense attaché in Moscow and lecturer in military civics at the Military Law Academy. Her childhood was marked with frequent moving due to her father's military and diplomatic assignment. As a child, she dreamed of becoming a flight attendant due to the frequent trips abroad and the flashy uniform.

After completing high school, she passed the test in geography major at the Gadjah Mada University but was rejected upon confirmation. She briefly studied electrical engineering at the Sepuluh Nopember Institute of Technology (ITS), before receiving news of her acceptance at the communications major at the University of Indonesia in 1977 while undergoing orientation in ITS.

At the University of Indonesia, she recounted her feeling intimidated by her peers due to her appearance and even failed a course, causing her to be held back a year. She addressed this setback by engaging in numerous extra-curricular activities like a secretarial course and working part-time as an administrative staff member in an educational institution. The introduction of the semester system later allowed her to catch up with her peers. Niniek also served as a research assistant at various research organizations and NGOs.

== Diplomatic career ==
Niniek was initially uninterested in pursuing a diplomatic career due to the transition from an activist and assistant lecturer to a civil servant and a diplomat with frequent relocation. Despite this, she decided to apply for the foreign department after being convinced by Rahadi Ramelan, his thesis advisor. Before taking the examination application, her father briefed her on global political dynamics and Indonesia's international position. She eventually passed the exam and completed her basic diplomatic education in 1985.

Her diplomatic career began at the information, social, and cultural section of the embassy in Washington, D.C., United States, from 1987 to 1991 with the rank of third secretary. During her posting in Washington, she met Sisjugo Tjahjono Siswojo, a local staff at the embassy in Washington, D.C., who was also an artist specializing in Javanese arts, photography, and performing arts. After marrying him and giving birth to her first child, she took a two-year leave without pay to take care of her family. Although she considered resigning from the foreign ministry, her husband's advice convinced her to continue her career as a diplomat.

Niniek continued her career in 1994, returning to the foreign ministry as a junior diplomat in the directorate for multilateral economic cooperation. After a two-year stint in the directorate, she undertook a first-level administrative staff and leadership training (Pendidikan dan Pelatihan Staf dan Pimpinan Administrasi Tingkat Pertama, Diklat SPAMA) and a mid-level diplomatic course and was promoted to the diplomatic rank of second secretary. She was then posted in the economic section at the embassy in Ankara, Turkey, from 1996 to 2000.

By the end of her career in Turkey, Niniek was promoted to the diplomatic rank of first secretary, and returned to serve in the foreign ministry's trade relations directorate from 2001 to 2002 and in the south-south cooperation from 2002 to 2003. She completed her senior diplomatic education in 2002 and by 2003 was posted at the economic section of the embassy in New Delhi with the rank of counsellor. She was promoted to the diplomatic rank of minister counsellor in 2006, becoming the embassy's head of chancery.

She returned to Indonesia in 2007 and became the deputy director (chief of subdirectorate) for NGOs in the foreign ministry. During this period, in 2009 she attended an international course on migration law in San Remo, Italy. From 3 January 2011 to 28 November 2012, Niniek became the chief of the health ministry's center for foreign cooperation. During her tenure, she represented Indonesia as a delegate in the 65th World Health Assembly.

=== Ambassador to Ukraine ===
On 3 September 2012, Niniek was installed as ambassador to Ukraine, with concurrent accreditation to Armenia and Georgia, after being nominated by President Susilo Bambang Yudhoyono and underwent assessment by the House of Representative's first commission in June. She presented her credentials to the President of Ukraine Viktor Yanukovych on 6 December 2012 and to the President of Armenia Serzh Sargsyan from 15 January 2013. Following the Russian annexation of Crimea in 2014, Niniek organized the evacuation of Indonesian citizens from Ukraine to Romania. Niniek later described the complicated position of Indonesia, as both western nations and Russia vied for Indonesia's support through démarche. Another crisis that Niniek handled is the Malaysia Airlines Flight 17 shootdown, in which she cooperated with Ukraine's foreign ministry to facilitate affected Indonesian citizens.

=== Advisor for diaspora affairs ===
After her ambassadorial tenure ended, on 18 March 2016 Niniek became the foreign minister's advisor (expert staff) for socio-cultural affairs and Indonesian diaspora empowerment. Her appointment marked the first time a high-level official was tasked to handle diaspora, although her position was outside the structure. During her tenure, she initiated the diaspora card—officially known as the Indonesian Overseas Card—which recognized the presence of diaspora and aimed at identifying Indonesia's diaspora based on their professions and expertise for potential collaboration. The card enables diaspora to access services like property purchases or financial products despite lacking Indonesian ID, and she state the possibility of the card to evolve to offer more powerful functions, potentially akin to India's lifelong visa for former citizens. After the card was signed into law on 3 August 2017 and launched on the occasion of Indonesia's 2017 independence day, Niniek travelled to various countries to introduced the card. The card was criticized by diaspora as it offered little real benefit, excluded Indonesians who had taken foreign citizenship, and was seen more as a government data-collection tool than a meaningful recognition of the diaspora.

=== Ambassador to Argentina ===
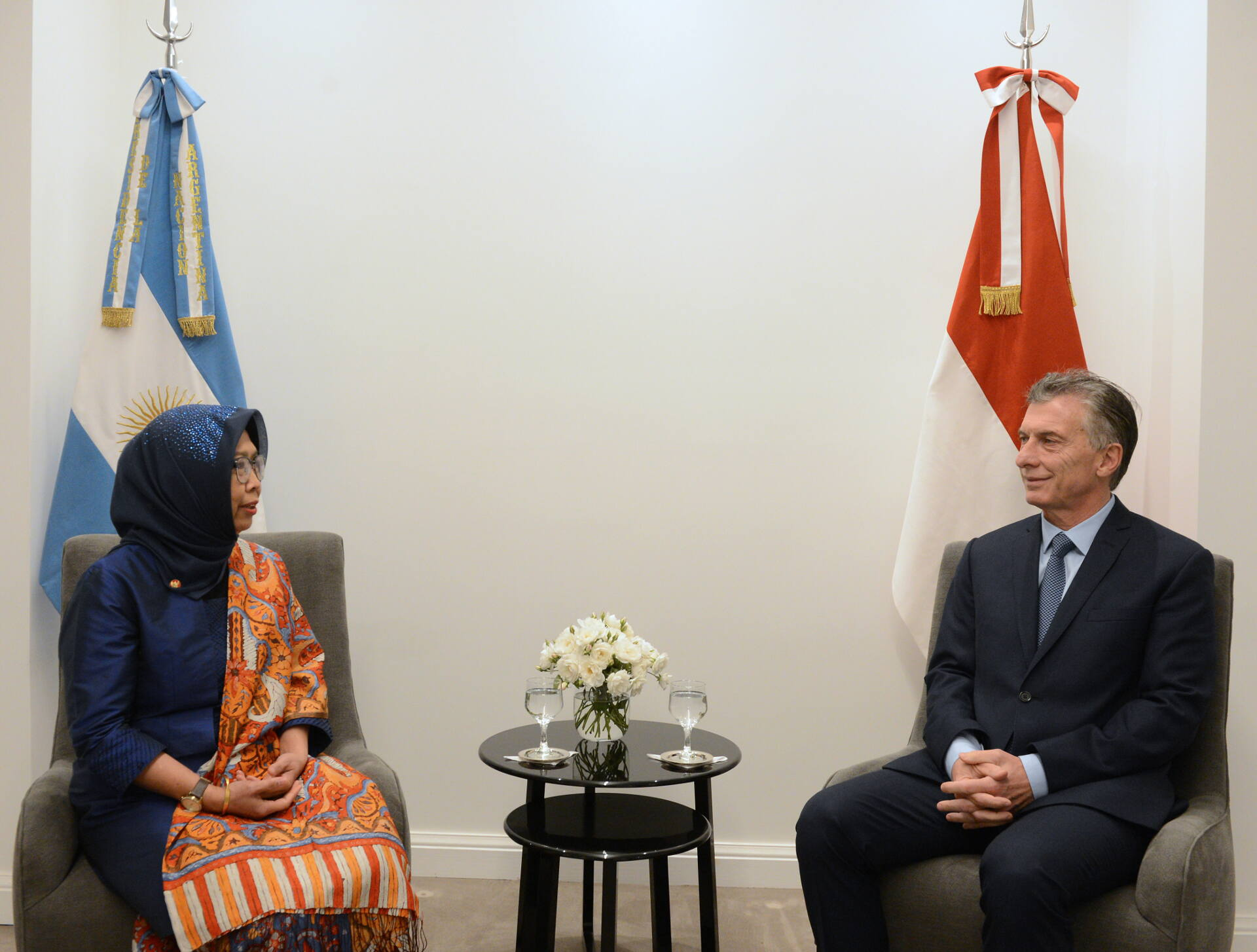
Niniek at the presentation of her credentials to the President of Argentina Mauricio Macri, 2018

In October 2017 Niniek was nominated by President Joko Widodo as ambassador to Argentina, with concurrent accreditation Paraguay and Uruguay. Upon passing an assessment by the House of Representative's first commission between 23 and 24 October 2017, she was sworn in as ambassador on 20 February 2018. She presented her credentials to the President of Argentina Mauricio Macri on 16 May 2018, President of Uruguay Tabaré Vázquez on 8 April 2019, President of Paraguay Mario Abdo Benítez on 23 April 2019.

As ambassadors she led efforts to strengthen relations, which included maximizing trade and supporting the independence struggle of Indonesia in international forums. She specifically focused on prioritizing economic diplomacy and protection of Indonesian citizens. She aimed to establish a transit house in Montevideo, Uruguay, for Indonesian citizens, primarily seafarers, who faced employment and other issues. Her husband also supported Niniek's work in promoting Indonesia, by using the gamelan and angklung instruments available in the embassy to teach Indonesian culture, including gamelan, to locals. Niniek often prepared Indonesian cuisine after practice sessions for the gamelan group in Argentina, which had about 20 local members.

During the COVID-19 pandemic in Argentina, the embassy formed a COVID-19 task force in early March 2020 to contact and ensure the health status of all estimated 200 Indonesian citizens in Argentina, Paraguay, and Uruguay. Niniek implemented a work from home policy for embassy staff to protect the embassy's diplomatic assets. Due to the ongoing lockdown implemented by the Argentinian government at that time, the embassy accommodated 19 stranded Indonesian citizens in the embassy complex.

=== Later life ===
After retiring from diplomatic service, Niniek joined the Indonesian Red Cross Society, serving as a board member for public and international relations. She was re-appointed to serve as a board member for international relations on 20 December 2024, serving until 2029.

In November 2023, as a Central Executive Board member of the Indonesian Red Cross Society, Niniek announced the organization's commitment of Rp 2.9 billion (approximately US$185,000) in humanitarian aid to Gaza amid the Israel-Hamas conflict, including medical supplies, food, and shelter materials, to be delivered via partner organizations.

In June 2024, Niniek participated as a speaker at the ICLEI World Congress 2024 in Freiburg, Germany ( 24–28 June), contributing to the session "Coastal Cities, Communities and Climate Change: Charting a Resilient Course." She discussed integrating humanitarian aid with climate adaptation strategies for vulnerable coastal populations.

== Awards and honors ==
- Civil Servants' Long Service Medal, 3rd Class (Indonesian: Satyalancana Karya Satya X Tahun) (2008)
- Ksatria Bakti Husada (2011)
- Civil Servants' Long Service Medal, 2nd Class (Indonesian: Satyalancana Karya Satya XX Tahun) (2016)
