= Ali Alatas =

Indonesian diplomat (1932–2008)

- علي العطاس
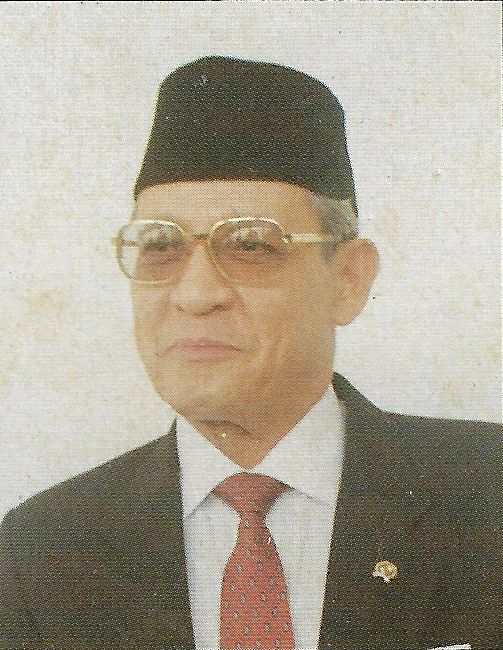
- Official portrait, 1993

1st Chairperson of the Presidential Advisory Council
- In office 10 April 2007 – 11 December 2008
- President: Susilo Bambang Yudhoyono
- Preceded by: Office established
- Succeeded by: T. B. Silalahi

13th Minister of Foreign Affairs
- In office 21 March 1988 – 20 October 1999
- President: Suharto; B. J. Habibie
- Preceded by: Mochtar Kusumaatmadja
- Succeeded by: Alwi Shihab

Personal details
- Born: 4 November 1932 Batavia, Dutch East Indies
- Died: 11 December 2008 (aged 76) Mount Elizabeth Hospital, Singapore
- Resting place: Kalibata Heroes' Cemetery
- Spouse: Junisa Wolff Alatas
- Relations: Witjaksana Soegarda (son-in-law)
- Children: Soraya Alatas Soegarda, Nadira Alatas Sriwijanarko; Fawzia Alatas-Patompo
- Occupation: Diplomat

Ali Alatas (Arabic: علي العطاس ʿAlī al-ʿAṭṭās; 4 November 1932 – 11 December 2008) was an Indonesian diplomat of Ba 'Alawi sada descent, who served as the country's foreign minister from 1988 to 1999. He was Indonesia's longest serving foreign minister.

== Education and early career ==
Alatas graduated from the Indonesian Foreign Service Academy in 1954 and earned a law degree from the University of Indonesia in 1956. Alatas joined the Indonesian foreign service in 1954 as a 22-year-old. His early career included stints in the Indonesian Embassy in Bangkok, Thailand and Embassy in Washington, DC. He was named Indonesia's ambassador to the UN, in Geneva from 1975 to 1978 and was also ambassador to the UN in New York from 1982 to 1988. In 1979, he was a strong contender for the powerful position of the director general for political affairs within the foreign ministry, which was regarded as the de facto deputy to the foreign minister in political affairs. Despite his feasibility for the position due to his age, Alatas was instead appointed as secretary to vice president Adam Malik.

== As foreign minister and after ==
He was Indonesia's Minister for Foreign Affairs from March 1988, serving three terms under the former Suharto administration and once under the Habibie administration in May 1998. He advocated regional cooperation and played a crucial role in drafting the ASEAN Charter and the Constitution of the 10-member grouping the Eminent Persons Group. He also brokered peace negotiations in several hot spots in Southeast Asia.

His most famous success was his role in helping to broker peace in Cambodia, in 1991, which ended the war with the Khmer Rouge. "Alatas brokered the historic 1991 peace settlement at the Paris International Conference to end the war with the Khmer Rouge, though he had to share some of the glory with France," The Guardian wrote, calling the settlement his "greatest triumph."

His obituary by Reuters said Alatas "was a widely respected figure in the region tipped at one stage to be a possible United Nations secretary-general" but that his later career was "haunted by the Suharto era and the turmoil in East Timor," the former Portuguese colony that voted for independence from Indonesia in 1999. Alatas recounted his role in the diplomatic controversy over Indonesia's annexation of East Timor in 1975 and the events leading to independence in The pebble in the shoe: The diplomatic struggle for East Timor. His obituary in The Guardian argued that a 1991 massacre of anti-Indonesian demonstrators at Santa Cruz cemetery in Dili, East Timor's capital, probably prevented Alatas from taking charge of the UN. "International outrage over the deaths may have cost Alatas the top UN job, for which he was in the running in the late 1990s," The Guardian wrote. "Suharto reportedly vetoed his candidacy as he believed the role would have highlighted such abuses." Alatas later termed the Santa Cruz massacre a "turning point" for Indonesia in East Timor.

On 30 March 1995 he was appointed an Honorary Officer of the Order of Australia, for service to Australian-Indonesian relations.

In 2003, Alatas was appointed as the United Nations special envoy to Burma. He arrived in Burma on 18 August 2005 for a three-day visit and sought the release of Aung San Suu Kyi.

Alatas served as chairman of the Presidential Advisory Council (Dewan Pertimbangan Presiden) in the Yudhoyono Administration.

== Death ==
On 11 December 2008, Alatas died at 7.30am, at the age of 76 of a heart attack at Mount Elizabeth Hospital in Singapore, with his wife and his three daughters at his bedside. At the Indonesian Embassy in Sungai Hanching on 13 December, Lim Jock Seng, Brunei Minister of Foreign Affairs and Trade II, signed a condolence book on behalf of the Bruneian government.

== Honours ==
=== National ===
- Indonesia:
  - Star of the Republic of Indonesia (3rd Class) (Indonesian: Bintang Republik Indonesia Utama)
  - Star of Mahaputera (2nd Class) (Indonesian: Bintang Mahaputera Adipradana)
  - Star of Mahaputera (3rd Class) (Indonesian: Bintang Mahaputera Utama)

=== Foreign honours ===
- Australia:
  - Honorary Officer (Civil Division) of the Order of Australia (AO)
- Austria:
  - Grand Decoration of Honour in Silver with Star of the Decoration of Honour for Services to the Republic of Austria
- Cambodia:
  - Grand Cross of the Royal Order of Sahametrei
- France:
  - Commandeur of the National Order of the Legion of Honour
- Japan:
  - Grand Cordon of the Order of the Rising Sun
- Philippines:
  - Grand Collar of the Order of Sikatuna, Rank of Raja (GCS)
- Thailand:
  - Knight Grand Cordon (Special Class) of the Most Exalted Order of the White Elephant (GCE)
  - Knight Grand Cordon (Special Class) of the Most Noble Order of the Crown of Thailand (KGCT)
  - Knight Grand Cross (First Class) of the Most Exalted Order of the White Elephant (KCE)

Political offices
Preceded by Mochtar Kusumaatmadja	Foreign minister of Indonesia; 1988–1999	Succeeded by Alwi Shihab
