= Andi Rasdiyanah Amir =

Indonesian Islamic scholar (1935–2023)

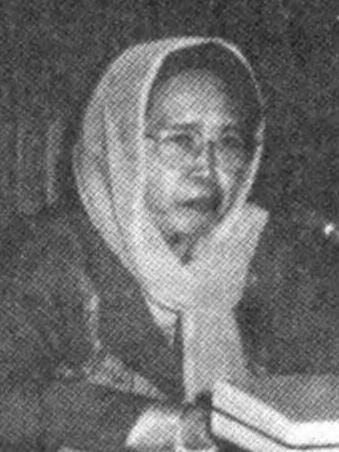

Director General for Islamic Institutions
- In office 30 April 1993 – 22 May 1996
- Minister: Tarmizi Taher
- Preceded by: Zarkowi Soejoeti
- Succeeded by: Abdul Malik Fadjar

Rector of the Alauddin Islamic State Institute
- In office 1 June 1985 – 4 January 1994
- Preceded by: Murad Usman
- Succeeded by: Shaleh Putuhena

Personal details
- Born: 14 February 1935 Bulukumba, South Sulawesi, Dutch East Indies
- Died: 19 January 2023 (aged 87) Makassar, South Sulawesi, Indonesia
- Spouse: Amin Said (m. 1962)
- Children: 5
- Education: Sunan Kalijaga State Islamic University

Andi Rasdiyanah Amir (14 February 1935 – 19 January 2023) was an Indonesian Islamic scholar and bureaucrat. Rasdiyanah was the rector of the Alauddin Islamic State Institute (now Alauddin Islamic State University) from 1985 to 1994. She was the first female to lead an Islamic higher education institution in Indonesia as well as the first female rector in the eastern part of Indonesia. At the end of her term as rector, Rasdiyanah was appointed by the minister of religious affairs as the director general for Islamic institutions. She was replaced in the position and continued teaching at the Alauddin Islamic State Institute until her death.

== Early life and education ==
Rasdiyanah was born on 8 September 1935 in Bulukumba, a regency in South Sulawesi. Her parents, Andi Paroddo and Andi Sure, were local aristocrats from the regency. Her father, Andi Paroddo, died while she was still an infant, and her education was mostly funded by her older brothers. Rasdiyanah began her primary education during the Japanese occupation. She was enrolled at a people's school (shōgakkō) in Barabba, a village in Bulukumba. She finished her elementary school in 1946.

After completing her education at the people's school, Rasdiyanah was sent to study at Muhammadiyah-owned madrasas in Bulukumba. She studied in Bulukumba for seven years before moving to Yogyakarta, where she undertook her final year at a madrasa in the city. Rasdiyanah then attended an Islamic college preparation school for two years before studying ushuluddin (comparative religion) at the Sunan Kalijaga State Islamic Institute. During her time in the university, Rasdiyanah joined Aisyiyah, the women's wing of Muhammadiyah. She graduated from the university in 1963. Several years later, in 1982 Rasdiyanah obtained a doctorate from the institute.

== Career ==
=== Alauddin Islamic State Institute ===
Rasdiyanah returned to South Sulawesi shortly after her graduation and began working at the Makassar's branch of the Sunan Kalijaga State Islamic Institute. At that time, the only faculty in the branch was the sharia faculty. Due to a lack of staff, Rasdiyanah was rapidly promoted in academic ranks. In the same year, the tarbiyah (Islamic education) faculty was opened, and Rasdiyanah became the deputy dean of the faculty.

The Makassar's branch of the Sunan Kalijaga State Islamic Institute was officially separated in 1965 and became the Alauddin Islamic State Institute. Former mayor of Makassar Aroeppala became its first rector, and Rasdiyanah was appointed by Aroeppala as his deputy. After serving for five years, Rasdiyanah was moved to the sharia faculty of the institute and became the head of the ushuluddin studies. In 1972, Rasdiyana returned to the tarbiyah faculty and became its dean for eight years.

In January 1979, the Alauddin Islamic State Institute held an election for a new rector to replace the old and ailing Abdurrahman Shihab. Abdurrahman Shihab's decision of appointing his own son, Muhammad Quraish Shihab, as his first deputy rector, caused controversy among the students, and the students pushed for a rector election by the academic senate. Rasdiyanah was nominated as rector alongside Muhyiddin Zain, Abdurrahman Shihab's predecessor. Muhyiddin won the election with 16 votes, while Rasdiyanah was in the second place with 12 votes. Unexpectedly, Muhyiddin died before he was about to be sworn in as Shihab's replacement.

Muhyiddin's death made Rasdiyanah the front-runner in the election and the minister of religious affairs made plans to appoint her as Shihab's replacement. However, due to her being a woman, the South Sulawesi's regional government and the Indonesian Ulema Council expressed their disapproval. The governor of South Sulawesi, Andi Oddang, questioned her ability as a woman in handling possible student demonstrations. The disapproval was met with criticism from the chairman of Makassar's Muhammadiyah branch, who stated that women had already been leaders in South Sulawesi for ages. Due to the disagreements, a temporary triumvirate was appointed to lead the university. The triumvirate was dissolved after Murad Usman, former dean of the ushuluddin studies, was elected as a definitive rector. Murad then appointed Rasdiyanah as his deputy rector for student affairs.

At the end of Murad's term as rector, Rasdiyanah was appointed his replacement. She was installed as rector on 1 June 1985. Rasdiyanah was the first ever female to lead an Islamic higher education institution in Indonesia as well as the first female rector in the eastern part of Indonesia. She was re-appointed for a second term in 1989.

=== Department of Religious Affairs and later life ===
Rasdiyanah was appointed by the Minister of Religious Affairs as the Director General for Islamic Institutions several months before the end of her tenure as rector. Rasdiyanah was sworn in as director general on 30 April 1993 and was relieved of her office of rector on 4 January 1994. During her tenure, the government introduced a nine-year compulsory education program. Rasdiyanah tried to implement the compulsory education program in Islamic educational institutions such as madrasas and pesantren, but failed as it was deemed too burdensome by the education authorities. After three years of service as director general, Rasdiyanah handed over her office to Abdul Malik Fadjar on 27 May 1996.

Upon her retirement from the department of religious affairs, Rasdiyanah continued to teach in the Alauddin Islamic State Institute. Previously, in 1995 Rasdiyanah became a professor in hadith studies at the university. She became the chairwoman of the institute's council of professors and the director for postgraduate studies in 1996. In 1997, Rasdiyanah was nominated as a possible candidate for the governor of South Sulawesi, but failed to compete in the election.

In 2005, the Alauddin Islamic State Institute was upgraded into the Alauddin Islamic State University. Rasdiyanah continued to head the postgraduate studies in the university until 2010. In that year, the university published a festschrift about her.

== Personal life and death ==
Rasdiyanah was married to Amin Said, a lecturer in the Alauddin Islamic State University, on 14 April 1962. The couple has four daughters and a son.

Rasdiyanah died in Makassar on the morning of 19 January 2023, at the age of 87.
