= List of ministers of religious affairs (Indonesia) =

Minister of Religious Affairs

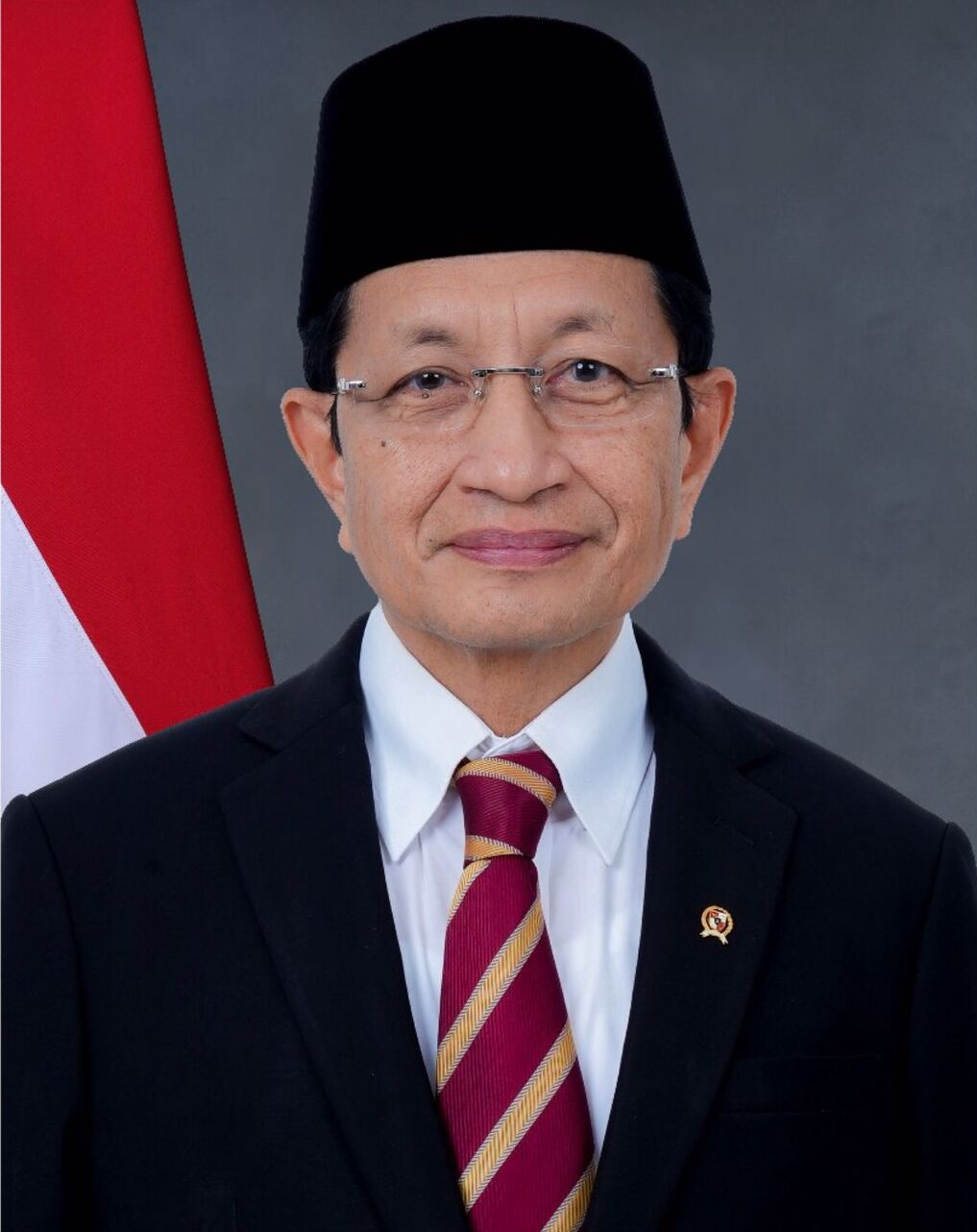
- Incumbent; Nasaruddin Umar since 21 October 2024
- Appointer: President of Indonesia
- Inaugural holder: Rasjidi
- Formation: 3 January 1946

This article lists persons and politicians who have been appointed as the minister of religious affairs in Indonesia.
Political party:
Non-partisan Masyumi PSII NU Golkar PPP PKB
Islamic organization:
NU Muhammadiyah

No	Photo	P	O	Name	Cabinet	Took office	Left office	Affiliation	R
1				Wahid Hasyim	Presidential	2 September 1945	14 November 1945		
2				Rasjidi	Sjahrir I	14 November 1945	12 March 1946	Masyumi-Muhammadiyah	
2				Rasjidi	Sjahrir II	12 March 1946	2 October 1946	Masyumi-Muhammadiyah	
3				Fathurrahman Kafrawi	Sjahrir III	2 October 1946	26 June 1947	Masyumi-NU	
4				Achmad Azhari (Note: Achmad Azhari never confirmed his appointment after being arrested in the Operation Product.)	Amir Sjarifuddin I	3 July 1947	9 October 1947	PSII	
5				Anwaruddin	Amir Sjarifuddin I	9 October 1947	11 November 1947	PSII	
6				Masjkur	Amir Sjarifuddin II	11 November 1947	29 January 1948	Masyumi-NU	
6				Masjkur	Hatta I	29 January 1948	4 August 1948	Masyumi-NU	
—				Teuku Mohammad Hasan	Emergency	19 December 1948	13 July 1949	Muhammadiyah	
(6)				Masjkur	Hatta II	4 August 1949	20 December 1949	Masyumi-NU	
—				Wahid Hasyim	RUSI	20 December 1949	6 September 1950	Masyumi-NU	
(6)				Masjkur	Susanto	20 December 1949	21 January 1950	Masyumi-NU	
7	l			Fakih Usman	Halim	21 January 1950	6 September 1950	Masyumi-Muhammadiyah	
(1)				Wahid Hasyim	Natsir	6 September 1950	3 April 1951	Masyumi-NU	
(1)				Wahid Hasyim	Sukiman	27 April 1951	3 April 1952	Masyumi-NU	
(7)				Fakih Usman	Wilopo	3 April 1952	30 July 1953	Masyumi-Muhammadiyah	
(6)				Masjkur	Ali Sastroamidjojo I	30 July 1953	12 August 1955	NU	
8				Muhammad Ilyas	Burhanuddin Harahap	12 August 1955	19 January 1956	NU	
8				Muhammad Ilyas	Ali Sastroamidjojo II	24 March 1956	14 March 1957	NU	
8				Muhammad Ilyas	Djuanda	9 April 1957	10 July 1959	NU	
8				Wahib Wahab	Working I (Note: As the Junior Minister of Religious Affairs. During this cabinet, there was no Minister of Religious Affairs. The Junior Minister of Religious Affairs is under the Minister of People's Welfare.)	10 July 1959	18 February 1960	NU	
8				Wahib Wahab	Working II	18 February 1960	6 March 1962	NU	
9				Saifuddin Zuhri	Working III	6 March 1962	13 November 1963	NU	
9				Saifuddin Zuhri	Working IV	13 November 1963	27 August 1964	NU	
9				Saifuddin Zuhri	Dwikora I	27 August 1964	22 February 1966	NU	
9				Saifuddin Zuhri	Dwikora II	22 February 1966	31 March 1966	NU	
9				Saifuddin Zuhri	Dwikora III	31 March 1966	28 July 1966	NU	
9				Saifuddin Zuhri	Ampera I	28 July 1966	14 October 1967	NU	
10				Muhammad Dahlan	Ampera II	14 October 1967	10 June 1968	NU	
10				Muhammad Dahlan	Development I	10 June 1968	11 September 1971	NU	
11				Abdul Mukti Ali	Development I	11 September 1971	28 March 1973	Golkar	
11				Abdul Mukti Ali	Development II	28 March 1973	29 March 1978	Golkar	
12				Alamsyah Ratu Perwiranegara	Development III	29 March 1978	19 March 1983	Golkar	
13				Munawir Sjadzali	Development IV	19 March 1983	21 March 1988	Golkar	
13				Munawir Sjadzali	Development V	21 March 1988	17 March 1993	Golkar	
14				Tarmizi Taher	Development VI	17 March 1993	14 March 1998	Golkar	
15				Muhammad Quraish Shihab	Development VII	14 March 1998	21 Mei 1998	NU	
16				Abdul Malik Fadjar	Development Reform	23 Mei 1998	20 October 1999	Muhammadiyah	
17				Tolchah Hasan	National Unity	26 October 1999	23 July 2001	NU	
18				Said Agil Husin Al Munawar	Mutual Assistance	10 August 2001	20 October 2004	NU	
19				Muhammad Maftuh Basyuni	United Indonesia I	21 October 2004	20 October 2009	NU	
20				Suryadharma Ali	United Indonesia II	22 October 2009	28 Mei 2014	PPP-NU	
—				Agung Laksono (acting)	United Indonesia II	28 Mei 2014	9 June 2014	Golkar	
21				Lukman Hakim Saifuddin	United Indonesia II	9 June 2014	27 October 2014	PPP-NU	
21				Lukman Hakim Saifuddin	Working	27 October 2014	20 October 2019	PPP-NU	
22				Fachrul Razi	Onward	23 October 2019	23 December 2020	Military	
22				Yaqut Cholil Qoumas	Onward	23 December 2020	20 October 2024	PKB-NU	
23				Nasaruddin Umar	Red and White	21 October 2024	Incumbent	Independent-NU	

== Deputy ministers ==
Following are politicians who have been appointed as the deputy minister of religious affairs in Indonesia.
Political party:
Non-partisan PPP
Islamic organization:
NU Muhammadiyah

No	Photo	P	O	Name	Cabinet	Minister	Took office	Left office	Affiliation	R
1				Nasaruddin Umar	United Indonesia II	Suryadharma Ali (2009–2014)	19 October 2011	20 October 2014	NU	
1				Nasaruddin Umar	United Indonesia II	Lukman Hakim Saifuddin (2014–2019)	19 October 2011	20 October 2014	NU	
Vacant					Working	Lukman Hakim Saifuddin (2014–2019)				
2				Zainut Tauhid Sa'adi	Onward Indonesia	Fachrul Razi (2019–2020)	25 October 2019	17 July 2023	PPP-NU	
2				Zainut Tauhid Sa'adi	Onward Indonesia	Yaqut Cholil Qoumas (2020–)	25 October 2019	17 July 2023	PPP-NU	
3				Saiful Rahmat Dasuki	Onward Indonesia	Yaqut Cholil Qoumas (2020–)	17 July 2023	20 October 2024	PPP-NU	

== Bibliography ==
- Departemen Agama R.I. (1996), Amal Bakti Departemen Agama R.I., Jakarta
- Mietzner, Marcus (2009), Military Politics, Islam, and the State in Indonesia: From Turbulent Transition to Democratic Consolidation, Jakarta: Institute of Southeast Asian Studies, ISBN 9789812307880

== See also ==
- Cabinet of Indonesia
- Ministry of Religious Affairs
