= Umar Shihab =

Indonesian Islamic scholar and politician (1939–2026)

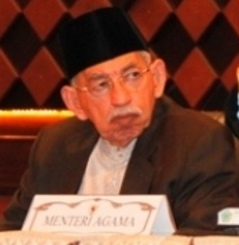
- Shihab in 2013

Member of the House of Representatives of Indonesia
- In office 1992–1997
- Constituency: South Sulawesi

Chairman of the Ukhuwah Islamiyah of the Indonesian Ulama Council
- In office 1998–2015

Personal details
- Born: 2 July 1939 Sidenreng Rappang Regency, Celebes and Dependencies Residency, Dutch East Indies
- Died: 21 March 2026 (aged 86) Jakarta, Indonesia
- Party: Golkar
- Parent: Abdurrahman Shihab (father)
- Relatives: Quraish Shihab (brother); Alwi Shihab (brother); Ahmad Nizar Shihab (brother)
- Education: Alauddin Islamic State University; Al-Azhar University; Hasanuddin University
- Occupation: Islamic scholar

Umar Shihab (2 July 1939 – 21 March 2026) was an Indonesian Islamic scholar and politician. A member of Golkar, he served in the House of Representatives of Indonesia from 1992 to 1997, and as chairman of the Ukhuwah Islamiyah of the Indonesian Ulama Council from 1998 to 2015.

In 2017, he wrote the book Different Sects, One Islam, published by Elex Media Komputindo.

Shihab died in Jakarta on 21 March 2026, at the age of 86.
