= Abdurrahman Shihab =

Anregurutta professor Habib Abdurrahman Shihab
- عبد الرحمن شهاب
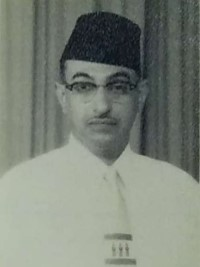
- Portrait of Abdurrahman Shihab as a member of the Constituent Assembly of the Republic of Indonesia

Member of Constitutional Assembly of Indonesia
- In office 9 November 1956 – 5 July 1959
- President: Sukarno
- Prime Minister: Ali Sastroamidjojo; Djuanda Kartawidjaja
- Parliamentary group: Masyumi
- Constituency: South-Southeast Sulawesi

2nd Rector of the Indonesian Muslim University of Makassar
- In office 1959–1965
- Preceded by: Prof. Muchtar Lintang
- Succeeded by: La Tunrung

3rd Rector of the Alauddin Islamic State University
- In office 1973–1979
- Preceded by: Drs. H. Muhyiddin Zain
- Succeeded by: Drs. H. A. Moerad Oesman

Personal details
- Pronunciation: ʕabd ar-raħmaːn ʃihaːb
- Born: Abd al-Rahman; 14 January 1915 Makassar, Celebes, Dutch East Indies
- Died: 1986 (aged 70–71) Ujung Pandang, South Sulawesi, Indonesia
- Party: Masyumi Party
- Children: 13 (including Umar Shihab, Quraish Shihab, Alwi Shihab, and Ahmad Nizar Shihab)
- Education: Jamiat Kheir
- Occupation: Ulama (mufassir); academic; politician

Anregurutta professor Habib Abdurrahman Shihab (Arabic: عبد الرحمن شهاب, romanized: ʿAbd ar-Raḥman Šihāb; Arabic pronunciation: [ʕabd arːaħmaːn ʃihaːb]; 14 January 1915 – 1986) was an Indonesian academic, politician, and Qur'anic interpretation expert (mufassir) from Makassar, South Sulawesi. As a politician, Abdurrahman was a member of the Constitutional Assembly of Indonesia (9 November 1956 – 5 July 1959) from the Masyumi Party fraction. Meanwhile, as an academician, he served as 2nd rector of the Indonesian Muslim University of Makassar in the period 1959–1965 and the 3rd rector of the Alauddin Islamic State University from 1973 to 1979.

== Biography ==
=== Early life ===
Abdurrahman Shihab was born in Makassar, South Sulawesi as the only child of Habib Ali bin Abdurrahman Shihab, a preacher and education cleric from Hadhramaut, Yemen. Abdurrahman came from the Arab Hadhrami family of the Ba 'Alawi sada group surnamed Aal Shihab-Uddīn. His father had immigrated from Hadhramaut to South Sulawesi since he was young to preach, he died in Makassar in 1333 AH (around 1915 AD) at the age of 52 when Abdurrahman was a baby.

=== Education ===
Because Abdurrahman had been orphaned since a baby, stepping on young he was invited by his uncle to Jakarta to be sent to school at Jamiat Kheir. He began his education at the madrasah ibtidaiyah level (Europeesche Lagere School level) in Jamiat Kheir and graduated in 1927. After that, he continued his education at the madrasah tsanawiyah level (Meer Uitgebreid Lager Onderwijs level) and graduated in 1930, while at the madrasah aliyah level (Algemene Middelbare School level) he completed in 1934. After graduating from Jamiat Kheir, Abdurrahman then returned to South Sulawesi and lived in Rappang, Sidenreng Rappang Regency for 10 years.

=== Personal life ===
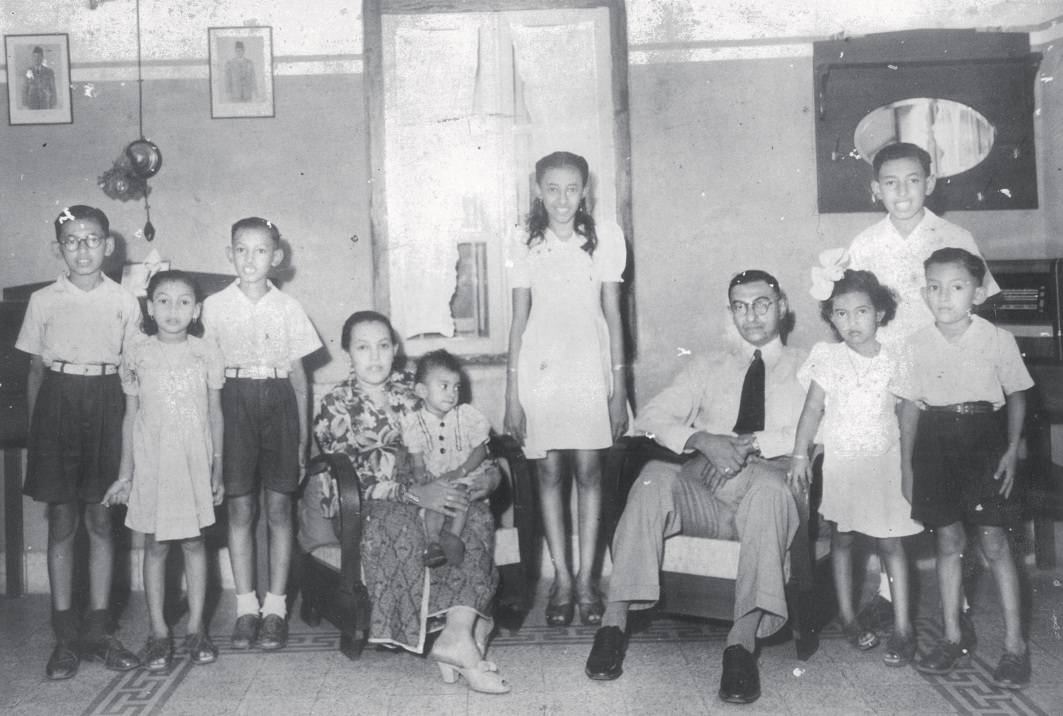
Abdurrahman with his wife and children around the 1950s

After staying for 10 years at Sidenreng Rappang, Abdurrahman married a Bugis girl, a local noble daughter named Asma Aburisy. From his marriage to Asma, Abdurrahman was blessed with 13 children, including Nur Shihab, Ali Shihab, Umar Shihab, Quraish Shihab, Wardah Shihab, and Alwi Shihab, his first six children were born in Rappang, Sidenreng Rappang Regency. While seven other children were born in Kampung Buton, Makassar, because after the birth of Alwi, Abdurrahman took his family to Jalan Sulawesi Lorong 194/7 Makassar City. The seven children born in Kampung Buton included Nina Shihab, Sida Shihab, Ahmad Nizar Shihab, Abdul Mutalib Shihab, Salwa Shihab, Ulfa Shihab, and Latifah Shihab.

Of the thirteen children, some of them followed in the footsteps of Abdurrahman as a mufassir (Qur'anic exegete), academic, and politician. Like his third child, Umar, was a cleric who sat on the ranks of members of the Indonesian Ulema Council. While the Quraish and Alwi were Qur'anic interpreters and both once sat in the government seat as a ministers. Aside from being interpreters who wrote monumental works of Tafsir Al-Mishbah, Quraish was also the Minister of Religious Affairs in the Seventh Development Cabinet of the Suharto era, while Alwi was the Minister of Foreign Affairs in the National Unity Cabinet of the Abdurrahman Wahid era and the Coordinating Minister for People's Welfare in the United Indonesia Cabinet of the Susilo Bambang Yudhoyono era. As a politician, Alwi had even been the chairman of the National Awakening Party for the 2002–2005 period, and in 2006, he became one of the founders of the Ulema National Awakening Party. Meanwhile, Nizar, Abdurrahman's ninth child was an anesthesiologist and had been a member of the People's Representative Council of the Republic of Indonesia for the period 2009–2014.

== Career ==
=== Political ===
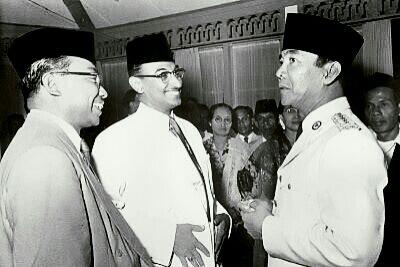
Abdurrahman Shihab (center) with Sukarno (right) at Constitutional Assembly of Indonesia.

Abdurrahman began actively working in politics since the 1950s. During 1950–51, he was active as a member and administrators of the Makassar branch of the Masyumi, only in 1951–52 was he appointed a member of the Majelis Syuro Masyumi for the Sulawesi region, and in 1952–56 he became a member of the Masyumi leadership for the Sulawesi region.

In the 1955 Indonesian Constituent Assembly election, Abdurrahman succeeded in occupying the parliamentary seat as a member of the Constituent Assembly of Indonesia from the Masyumi Party fraction in the electoral district of South-Southeast Sulawesi with membership number 322.
