= Muhammad Alhamid =

Indonesian academic

- محمد الحامد
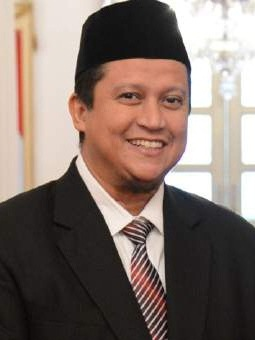
- Portrait of Muhammad Alhamid as member of Election Organization Ethics Council

Chairman of Election Supervisory Board of the Republic of Indonesia
- In office 12 April 2012 – 6 April 2017
- President: Susilo Bambang Yudhoyono; Joko Widodo
- Preceded by: Bambang Eka Cahya Widodo
- Succeeded by: Abhan

Member of Election Organization Ethics Council of the Republic of Indonesia
- Incumbent
- Assumed office 12 June 2017 Serving with: Harjono (chairman); Ida Budhiati; Teguh Prasetyo; Alfitra Salamm; Hasyim Asy`ari; Ratna Dewi Pettalolo
- Preceded by: Jimly Asshiddiqie (chairman); Nur Hidayat Sardini; Saut Hamonangan Sirait; Anna Erliyana; Valina Singka Subekti; Ida Budhiati; Nelson Simanjuntak

Personal details
- Born: Muhammad; September 17, 1971 (age 54) Makassar, South Sulawesi
- Spouse: Lubena Umar Alahaddad
- Children: 5 (see below)
- Parents: Sayyid Alhamid (father); Syarifah Aisyah Sadiq Alaydrus (mother)
- Education: SMA Negeri 4 Makassar (1990); Hasanuddin University (bachelor's degree, 1994); Hasanuddin University (master's degree, 1999); Airlangga University (doctor's degree, 2007)
- Occupation: Professor; academic; lecturer; civil servant
- Awards: Satyalancana Karya Satya 10 years service (2012); Bintang Penegak Demokrasi Utama (August 13, 2015)
- Organization: Islamic Defenders Front (until 2012)

Muhammad Alhamid (Arabic: محمد الحامد, romanized: Muḥammad al-Ḥāmid, Arabic pronunciation: [(ʔ)mʊˈħæmmæd al-ħaːmid]; born September 17, 1971) is an Indonesian professor, academic, lecturer, and civil servant. Muhammad was the chairman of the Election Supervisory Agency (Bawaslu) for the period 2012–2017, after completing his duties as chairman of the Bawaslu, he was later appointed as a member of the Election Organization Ethics Council of the Republic of Indonesia (DKPP RI) for the period 2017–2022 and was inaugurated on 12 June 2017 by Indonesian President Joko Widodo.

As an academic, he completed his doctoral education at Airlangga University in 2007. Three years later, he was appointed chairman of the Political Science Department of the Faculty of Social and Political Sciences of the Hasanuddin University from 2010 to 2012. On February 28, 2015, he was confirmed as a professor in the field of Sociology in the Faculty of Social and Political Sciences, Hasanuddin University.

== Biography ==
=== Early life and family ===
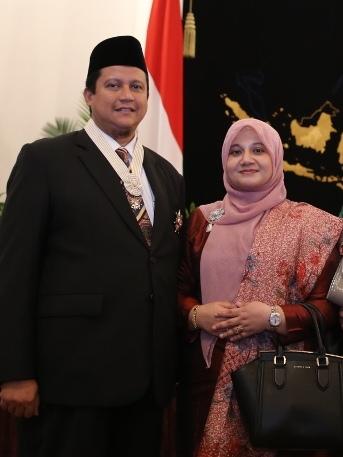
Muhammad Alhamid and his wife, Lubena Umar Alahaddad.

Muhammad was born in Makassar from a married couple who came from an Arab Indonesian family of the Ba 'Alawi sada clan named Sayyid Alhamid and Syarifah Aisyah Sadiq Alaydrus. He married an Indonesian Arab women with the surname Alhaddad named Lubena Umar Alahaddad. From his marriage to Lubena, he has 5 children named Fatimah Zahra, Jakfar Sodiq, Khadijah, Aisyah, and Umar Muchdar.

=== Education ===
Muhammad completed his elementary school in 1984 in Makassar. After that he went to junior high school in SMP Negeri 7 in Ujung Tanah sub-district, Makassar and graduated in 1987. In 1990, he graduated from SMA Negeri 4 Makassar and the following year immediately continued his undergraduate education to Hasanuddin University, he graduated with Sarjana Ilmu Pemerintahan degree (Bachelor of Science in government; abbreviated as SIP in Indonesia) in 1994. While he obtained the Master of Science (in Indonesia abbreviated as MSi) degree in 1999 at the same university. For the doctoral program, he completed it at Airlangga University in 2007.

== Career ==
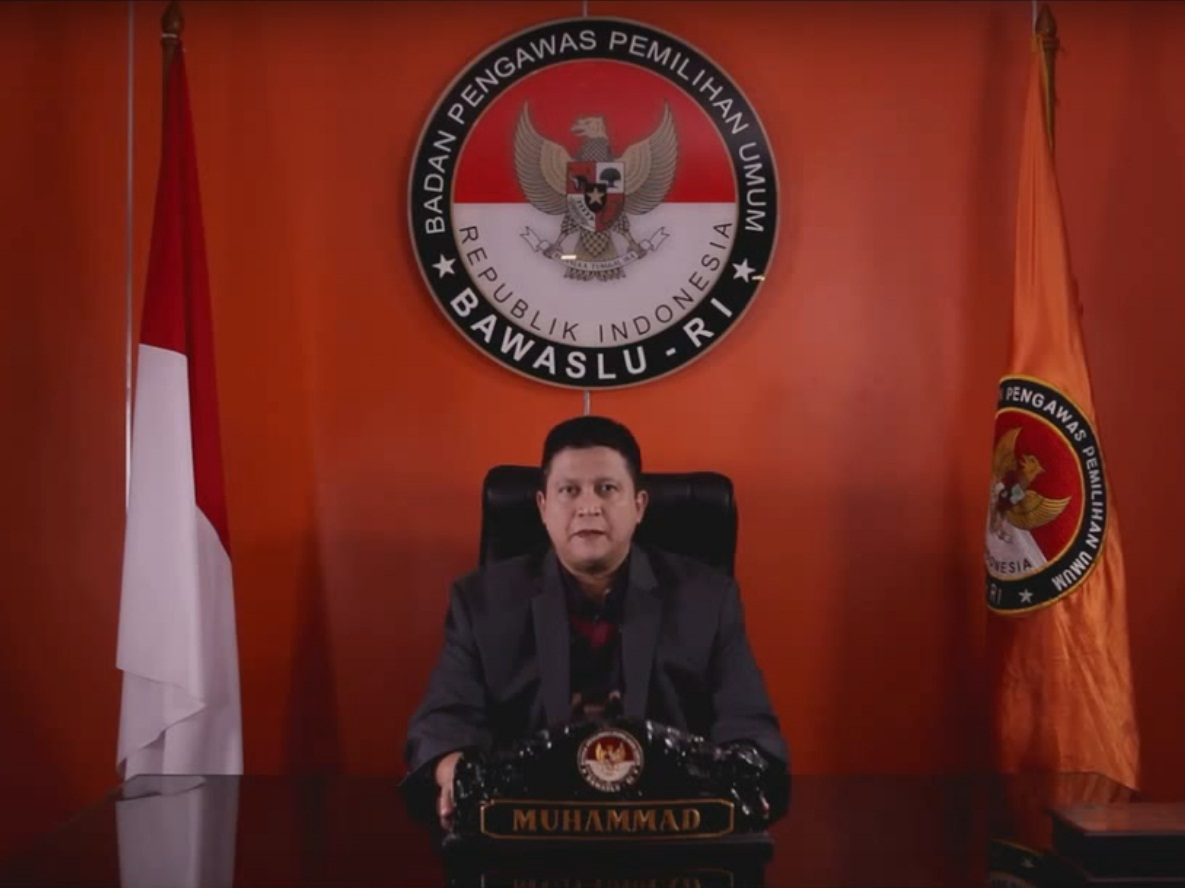
Muhammad Alhamid while serving as chairman of the Election Supervisory Board of the Republic of Indonesia.

As an academic, Muhammad obtained his bachelor's and master's degrees at Hasanuddin University, while he obtained a doctoral degree from Airlangga University in 2007. In 2008, he was appointed as secretary of the Department of Political Science, Faculty of Social and Political Sciences, Hasanuddin University until 2010, only in 2010-2012 he was appointed as chairman of the department. On February 28, 2015, he was inaugurated as a professor in the field of Sociology at the Faculty of Social and Political Sciences of the Hasanuddin University by delivering his acceptance speech entitled "Realizing Quality Election Accountability and Integrated through the Transformation of Electoral Systems". The awarding of the professorship was given directly by Hasanuddin University Chancellor, Professor Doctor Dwia Aries Tina Pulubuhu, MA and witnessed directly by the Vice President of the Republic of Indonesia, Jusuf Kalla. In addition to being attended by the Vice President, the senate meeting was also attended by several figures, among others, Syahrul Yasin Limpo as Governor of South Sulawesi, Jimly Asshiddiqie as Chairman of Election Organization Ethics Council of the Republic of Indonesia, several members of the People's Representative Council of Indonesia, and several members of Bawaslu, KPU, and DKPP.

In addition to being a lecturer in various courses at Hasanuddin University since 1997, Muhammad has also been a lecturer in Indonesian Political Systems and Political Geography courses at the University of West Sulawesi since 2008. In addition, since 2010, he has also taught lectures on National Unity and Political Development at the Makassar Institute of Public Administration.

Muhammad's involvement in electoral oversight institutions began in 2009. At that time he was elected chairman of the Election Supervisory Committee (Panwaslu) of South Sulawesi Province in the 2009 legislative and presidential elections in Indonesia. Three years later, the Commission II of the People's Representative Council of the Republic of Indonesia chose him as the commissioner of the Election Supervisory Board of the Republic of Indonesia (Bawaslu RI) with the most votes. Muhammad served as chairman of the Bawaslu RI in the period 2012–2017, after completing his duties as chairman of the Bawaslu, he was later appointed as a member of the Election Organization Ethics Council of the Republic of Indonesia (DKPP RI) for the period 2017–2022 and was appointed on 12 June 2017 by Joko Widodo as President of Indonesia.

== Publications ==
=== Book ===
- Eksistensi DKPP RI dalam Mengawal Demokrasi dan Pemilu Bermartabat [The Existence of the DKPP RI in Escorting Dignified Democracy and Elections], published by Rajawali Press in 2018.

=== Journals ===
- Mewujudkan Akuntabilitas Pemilu [Realizing Election Accountability]. Demokrasi Journal, published by Jakarta National and Political Unity Agency in 2015.
- Menilik Kesiapan Bawaslu dalam Menangani Pelanggaran dan Sengketa Pemilu 2014 [Judging Bawaslu Readiness in Dealing with 2014 Election Violations and Disputes]. Pemilu dan Demokrasi Journal, published by Perludem Foundation in 2013.
- Gender Dalam Pandangan Islam [Gender in the Islamic View]. Al-Fikr Journal, published by Faculty of Ushuluddin and Philosophy, Alauddin Islamic State University in 2012.
- Akuntabilitas Pengawasan Pemilu yang Berkualitas dan Beradab [Accountability of Qualified and Civilized Election Supervision]. ADIL Journal, published by Faculty of Law, YARSI University in 2012.
- Peran International of Court dalam Penyelesaian Sengketa Palestina-Israel [The Role of the International of Court in the Settlement of the Palestinian-Israeli Dispute]. Al-Fikr Journal, published by Faculty of Ushuluddin and Philosophy, Alauddin Islamic State University in 2011.
- Nahdlatul Ulama dan Perubahan Budaya Politik di Indonesia [Nahdlatul Ulama and Changes in Political Culture in Indonesia]. El Harakah Journal, published by Maulana Malik Ibrahim State Islamic University Malang in 2010.
- Pembangunan Bangsa dan Pembentukan Negara [Nation Building and State Formation]. Swara Politika Journal, published by Faculty of Social and Political Sciences, Jenderal Soedirman University in 2010.
- Hegemoni Politik Muhammadiyah dalam Sistem Politik Indonesia [Muhammadiyah Political Hegemony in the Indonesian Political System]. Sosial Politik Journal, published by Faculty of Social and Political Sciences, Haluoleo University in 2009.
- Peran Nahdlatul Ulama dalam Perubahan Politik di Indonesia [The Role of the Nahdlatul Ulama in Political Change in Indonesia]. Sosial Politik Journal, published by Faculty of Social and Political Sciences, Haluoleo University in 2009.
- Politic and Rational Choice. Social Sciences Scientific Journal, published by University of Jember in 2008.
- Sistem Administrasi Publik dan Pembangunan Partisipatif di Sulawesi Selatan [Public Administration System and Participatory in South Sulawesi]. Administrasi Publik Journal, published by Lembaga Administrasi Negara Makassar in 2008.

=== Thesis and dissertation ===
- Uwa dan Perubahan Sosial: Studi Kasus Kepemimpinan Uwa dalam Proses Adopsi Inovasi Petani Rabbise (Melon) Pada Komunitas Tolotang Sulawesi Selatan [Uwa and Social Change: Case Study of Uwa Leadership in the Process of Adopting Farmer Rabbise (Melon) Innovations in the Tolotang Community of South Sulawesi], dissertation at Airlangga University in 2007.
- Analisis Tentang Faktor Penghambat Hak Inisiatif DPRD Sulawesi Selatan Periode 2004-2009 [Analysis of the Factors Inhibiting the Rights of the South Sulawesi DPRD Initiative for the 2004-2009 Period], thesis at Hasanuddin University in 1999.
- Dimensi Politik Pembangunan Kawasan Timur Indonesia [Political Dimension of Eastern Indonesia Development], thesis at Hasanuddin University in 1994.

== Awards ==
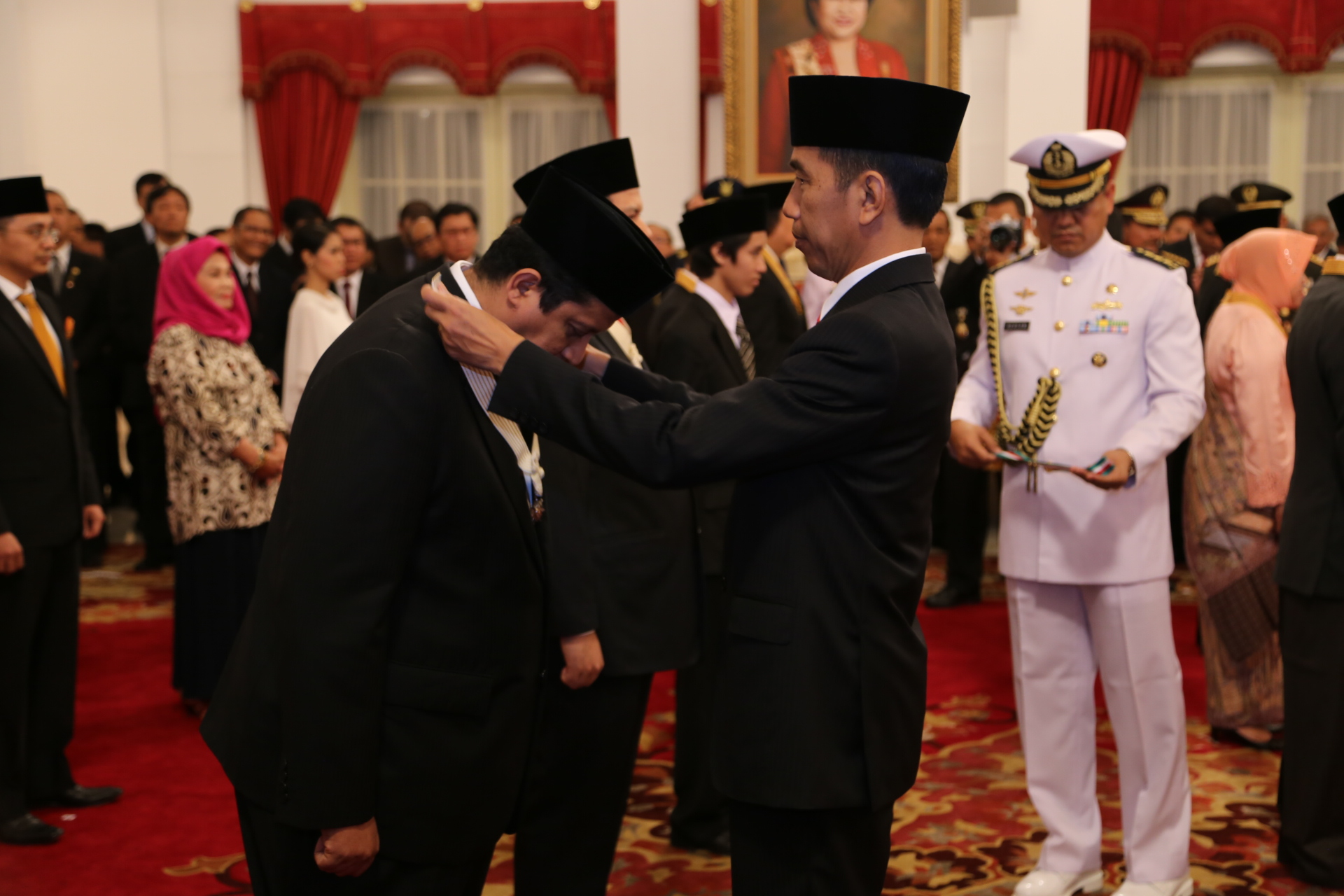
Muhammad was currently awarded the Bintang Penegak Demokrasi Utama.

As a form of his loyalty has become a civil servant, in 2012, Muhammad was awarded the Satyalancana Karya Satya 10 years service award by the Indonesian President, Susilo Bambang Yudhoyono. Then in 2015, Joko Widodo, as the President of Indonesia, officially awarded the honor of the 1st Class of Star of the Defenders of Democracy (Bintang Penegak Demokrasi Utama) to Muhammad, who at the time served as Chairman of the Election Supervisory Board of the Republic of Indonesia, the same award was given to Husni Kamil Manik as Chairman of the General Elections Commission of the Republic of Indonesia. The honorific is given based on the Republic of Indonesia's Presidential Decree Number 85/TK/YEAR 2015 dated August 7, 2015 concerning the awarding of honors. The awarding was given in the framework of the 70th anniversary of the independence of the Republic of Indonesia on August 13, 2015.
