= Malkan Amin =

Indonesian politician (1948–2020)

Malkan Amin (August 11, 1948 – December 9, 2020) was an Indonesian politician who represented both the Golkar and NasDem parties.

== Biography ==
Amin was born on August 11, 1948, in Barru, South Sulawesi, Indonesia. He did his primary and secondary schooling in Makassar. Starting in 1987, he became director of a construction business in Ujung Pandang, and from 1992 onwards various businesses located in Jakarta.

In 1997, he was elected as a Member of the People's Consultative Assembly (MPR), which he held for a 2-year term. He was a Member of the People's Representative Council from 1999 to 2013, representing the Golkar party for South Sulawesi. For a time, he was Deputy Secretary General of the party. In 2013, he decided to resign from Golkar to join the NasDem Party (National Democrats). For a time, he was chairman of NasDem's regional organization in West Sumatra.

== Death ==
Amin died from COVID-19 on December 9, 2020, at Wahidin Sudirohusodo Hospital in Makassar, South Sulawesi. He was 72 years old. At the time, he was running for office to become Bupati of Barru for Nasdem.
