= Andi Oddang =

Andi Oddang may refer to:

- Andi Oddang (footballer)
- Andi Oddang (governor)
