= Alwi Shihab =

Indonesian scholar and civil servant

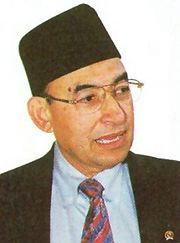
- Official portrait, c. 2004

13th Coordinating Minister for People's Welfare
- In office 21 October 2004 – 7 December 2005
- President: Susilo Bambang Yudhoyono
- Preceded by: Jusuf Kalla
- Succeeded by: Aburizal Bakrie

14th Minister of Foreign Affairs
- In office 26 October 1999 – 23 July 2001
- President: Abdurrahman Wahid
- Preceded by: Ali Alatas
- Succeeded by: Hassan Wirajuda

Member of the House of Representatives
- In office 1 October 1999 – 26 October 1999
- Succeeded by: Khatibul Umam Wiranu
- Constituency: Central Java

2nd General Chairman of National Awakening Party
- In office 20 January 2002 – 10 April 2005 (Acting 23 July 2001 – 20 January 2002)
- Preceded by: Matori Abdul Djalil
- Succeeded by: Muhaimin Iskandar

Personal details
- Born: Alwi Abdurrahman Shihab Rappang, South Sulawesi
- Party: Independent
- Other political affiliations: PKB (1998–2006); PKNU (2006–?)
- Spouse: Ashraf Shahab
- Children: 3
- Parents: Abdurrahman Shihab (father); Asma Aburisy (mother)
- Relatives: Quraish Shihab (brother); Najwa Shihab (niece)

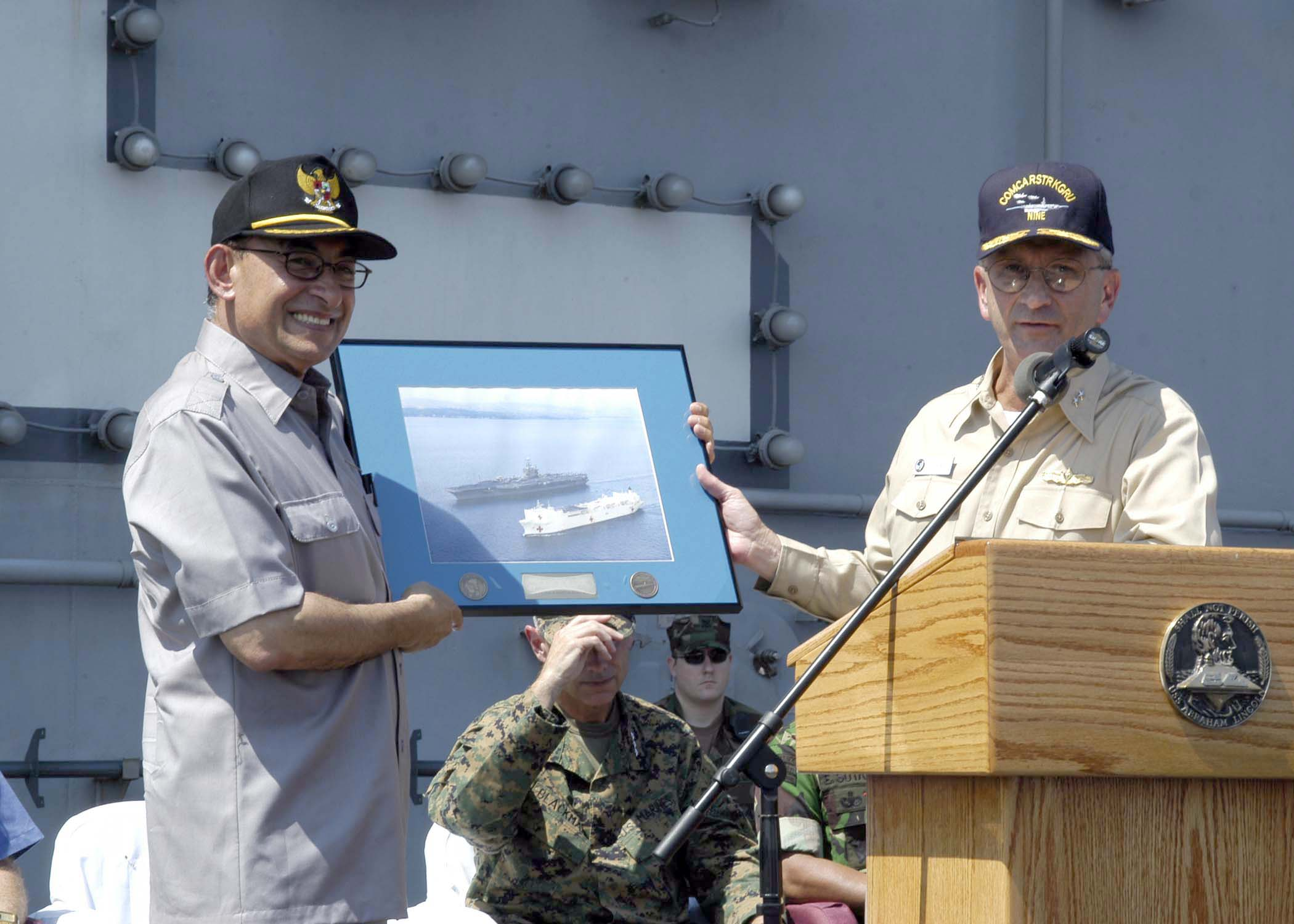
Alwi Shihab (left) receives a commemorative photo from Rear Admiral Doug Crowder aboard USS Abraham Lincoln, February 2005

Alwi Abdurrahman Shihab is an Indonesian politician and scholar of the interaction of Christian and Muslim communities who served as Indonesian Coordinating Minister for People's Welfare in 2004 to 2005 and Indonesian Foreign Minister from 1999 to 2001.

== Education ==
Born in Rappang, South Sulawesi, Alwi went to study basic education at Darul Nashihin Boarding School in Lawang, East Java. Later, Alwi's father Abdurrahman Shihab sent him and his brother Quraish Shihab to Cairo to continue their high school abroad. After completing his high school in Cairo, Alwi continued and completed his bachelor's degree from Al-Azhar University and acquired L.C. degree in 1968 in Islamic philosophy. He then continued his education in Indonesia and completed his master at Alaudin State Institute of Islamic Studies (Institut Agama Islam Negeri Alaudin), Ujung Pandang in 1986. His first doctoral degree was acquired in 1990 from University of Ain Shams, Cairo with research dissertation in the area of tasawwuf and Islamic philosophy with thesis title Islamic Sufism and Its Impact on Indonesian Contemporary Sufism.

In 1991, Alwi went to US to continue his education at Temple University, US. He and his family initially stayed in Carbondale, Illinois in 1991, but later moved to a town in Pennsylvania and completed his M.A in 1992. Not satisfied with a single doctoral degree, he then completed his second PhD from the same university in 1995 with dissertation The Muhammadiyah Movement and Its Controversy with Christian Mission in Indonesia. While at Temple, Alwi become assistant professor for the Department of Religion.

Alwi also did some post-doctorate at The Harvard University's Divinity School during 1995–1996 period. Later, he joined Hartford Seminary in Hartford as professor of religion. In 1998, he served as fellow and visiting professor at Harvard University's Divinity School - Center for the Study of World Religions.

In the 1990s, he wrote a book about Islam-Christianity interaction: Islam Inklusif. He also completed two works for publication: a manuscript entitled American Students’ Perceptions of Islam, and a translated (from Arabic to English) version of a previous publication entitled Islamic Mysticism and Its Impact on Indonesian Society.

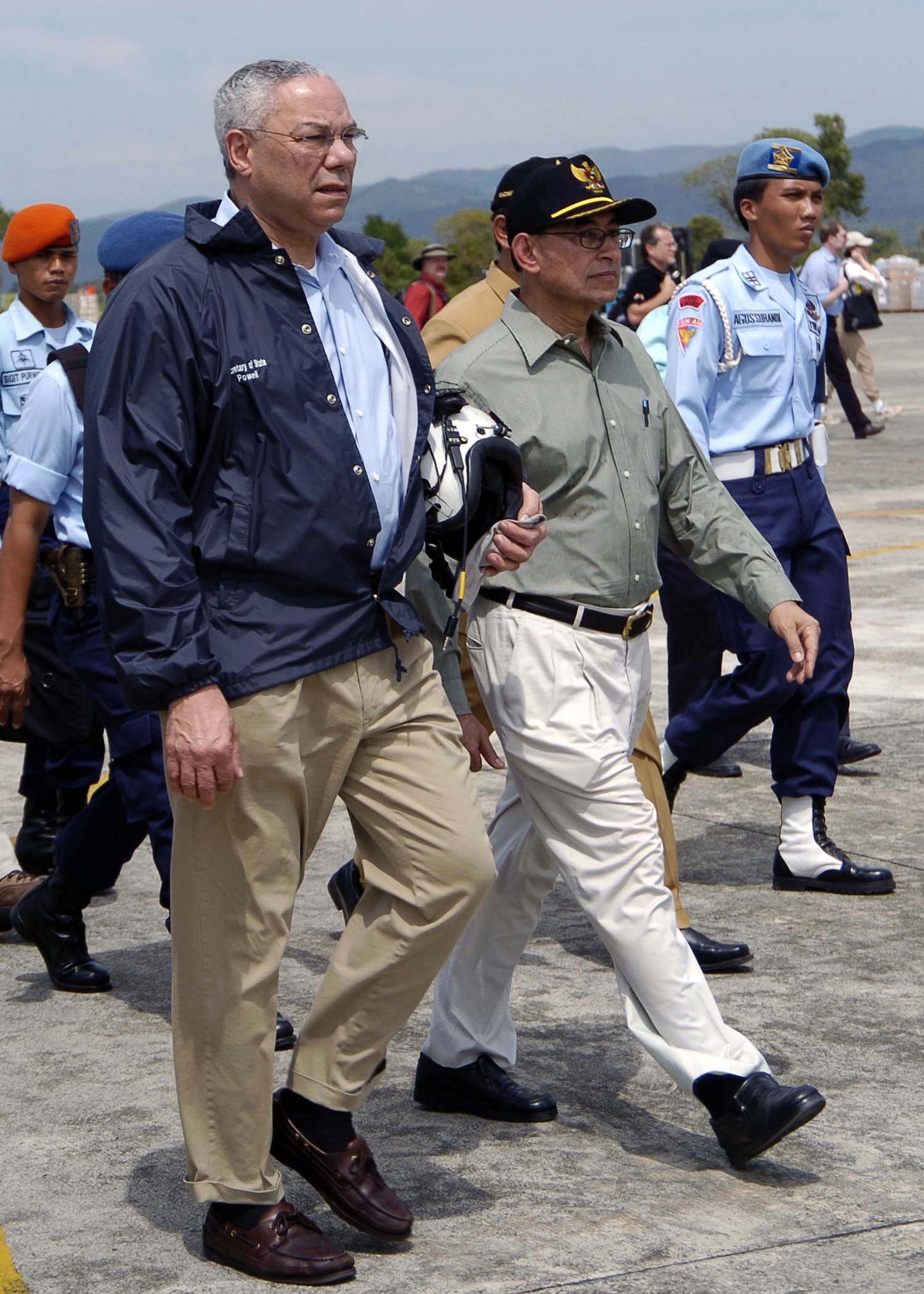
Alwi Shihab with Colin Powell, Jan 5, 2005

In 2002, he became adjunct professor for graduate programs at the University of Indonesia and currently is a member of Universitas Indonesia (UI) Board of Trustees.

== Career ==
In politics, his political career started when he was elected as member of Indonesian parliament and then minister of foreign affairs in The Wahid administration. Alwi was the chairman of PKB (The National Awakening Party). He served as Coordinating Minister for People's Welfare and a minister in Susilo Bambang Yudhoyono's cabinet.

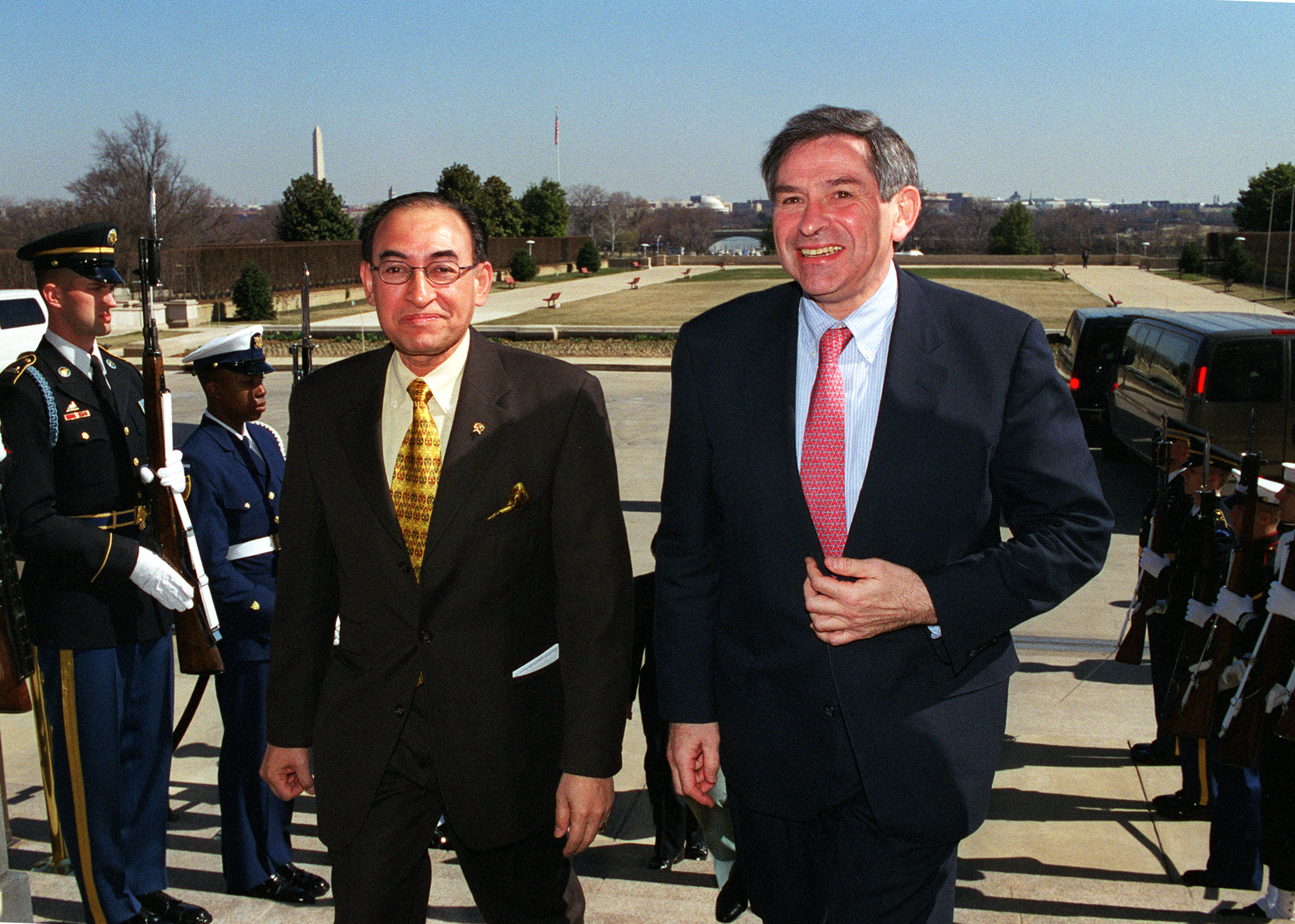
Indonesian Minister of Foreign Affairs Alwi Shihab (left) is escorted through an honor cordon and into the Pentagon by Deputy Secretary of Defense Paul Wolfowitz on March 12, 2001

Alwi, unlike his brothers who focus their career on education and Islamic studies only, has also strong business entrepreneurship. Since after completing his education in Cairo, Alwi started some businesses. In 1975 to 1979, he was CEO of Glass Priangan Factory in Cianjur, Indonesia. During 1979–1982, he was the President of Director for Alfa Contracting Company in Jeddah. In 1982 to 1986, he was the President of Director of PT. Prima Advera company in Jakarta. In 1982, he founded Yayasan Darul Qur'an, also in Jakarta. During 1986–1990, he became a member of board of directors at Eagle Tripelti in Jakarta and since 1986, he has been a member of the board of Dhafco Manunggal Sejati, Jakarta.

On 26 October 2004, he was honorarily discharged from PKB due to the party's internal political conflict and clash with some other leaders. In 2007, he founded his own party, Partai Kebangkitan Nasional Ulama (PKNU) or "Party of National Scholar Awakening" in which he still serves as the chairman until now.

Since 2006, Alwi has been appointed as the president's special envoy to the Middle East and the Organisation of Islamic Cooperation.

== Publications ==
Alwi has written a number of books, including:

- Akar Tasawuf di Indonesia - Antara Tasawuf Sunni dan Tasawuf Falsafi (The root of Sufism in Indonesia - Between Sunni Sufism and Philosophical Sufism), published by IMaN in 2009.
- Membedah Islam di Barat - Menepis Tudingan Meluruskan Kesalah pahaman (Dissecting Islam in the West - Dismissing Allegations, Straightening the Misunderstandings), published by Gramedia in 2004.
- Islam Sufistik, Mizan 2001.
- Membendung Arus - Respon Gerakan Muhammadiyah Terhadap Penetrasi Misi Kristen di Indonesia (Curbing the current - The Muhammadiyah's Response against Penetration of Christian Mission in Indonesia), Mizan, 1998.
- Islam Inklusif - Menuju Sikap Terbuka dalam Bergama (Inclusive Islam - Towards an Openness in Religion), Mizan, 1997.

== Personal life ==
Alwi Shihab is of Hadhrami Arab descent and claims a lineage as a Sayyid, or a descendant of the Islamic prophet Muhammad (via Zayn al-Abidin, his great-grandson).

He has continuously tried to present Islam as an inclusive, moderate religion, basing this on his reading of the Qur'an.

Political offices
Preceded by Ali Alatas	Foreign Minister of Indonesia; 1999–2001	Succeeded by Hassan Wirajuda
Preceded by Jusuf Kalla	Coordinating Minister for People's Welfare of Indonesia; 2004–2005	Succeeded by Aburizal Bakrie
