= Quraish Shihab =

Indonesian Muslim scholar (born 1944)

- قريش شهاب
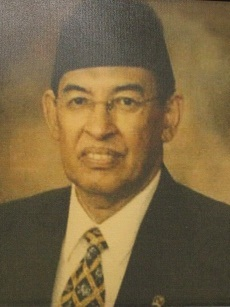
- Portrait of Muhammad Quraish Shihab as Minister of Religious Affairs of the Republic of Indonesia

Minister of Religious Affairs
- In office 14 March 1998 – 21 May 1998
- President: Suharto
- Preceded by: Tarmizi Taher
- Succeeded by: Malik Fajar

Other roles
- 1992–1998: Rector of Syarif Hidayatullah University
- 1984–: Board member of Indonesian Ulema Council

Personal details
- Born: Muhammad Quraish Shihab; 16 February 1944 (age 82) Rappang, Celebes, Japanese-occupied East Indies
- Spouse: Fatmawaty Assegaf
- Children: 5, including Najwa
- Parents: Abdurrahman Shihab (father); Asma Aburisy (mother)
- Website: www.quraishshihab.com

Muhammad Quraish Shihab (Arabic: محمّد قريش شهاب; Muḥammad Qurayš Šihāb; born 16 February 1944) is an Indonesian Muslim scholar in the sciences of the Qur'an, an author, an Academic Scholar, and former Minister of Religious Affairs in the Seventh Development Cabinet (1998). He is the older brother of the former Coordinating Minister for People's Welfare, Alwi Shihab.

== Biography ==
Quraish was born in Lotassalo, Rappang, on 16 February 1944. His father was Abdurrahman Shihab, an Islamic scholar and professor at State Institute of Islamic Sciences and his mother was Asma Aburisyi. Quraish is the fourth son of twelve siblings. His three older siblings, Nur, Ali (d) and Umar, and two younger siblings, Wardah and Alwi Shihab, were also born in Rappang. Seven other siblings namely Nina, Sida, Nizar, Abdul Muthalib (d), Salwa and twin sisters Ulfa and Latifah, were born in the village of Buton.

Quraish Shihab, called Bang Odes by his younger siblings, is an Arab Indonesian of Ba 'Alawi sada family, where his family lineage traces back to Muhammad, the Islamic prophet. In addition to Arab, he is also of Bugis descent.

== Personal life ==
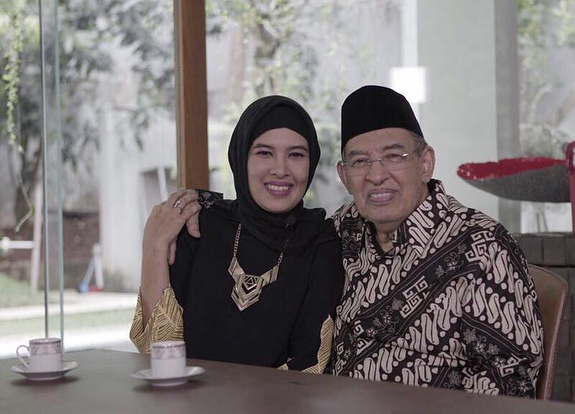
Quraish Shihab (right) and his eldest daughter, Najelaa Shihab (left).

Quraish married Fatmawaty Assegaf on 2 February 1975 in Surakarta. From the marriage, they have four daughters (Najelaa, Najwa, Nasywa, Nahla) and one son, Ahmad.

== Education ==
After completing his early education in Ujung Pandang, Quraish continued his secondary education in Malang, which he did while at the Dar al-Hadith Al-Faqihiyyah boarding school under guidance of Habib Abdul Qadir Bilfaqih.

In 1958, he went to Cairo, Egypt, and was admitted to 2nd grade in Al-Thanawiya (middle school level) at Al-Azhar. In 1967, he earned an LC (Bachelor's degree) from the Department of Tafsir and Hadith, the faculty of Islamic Theology in Al-Azhar University. He continued his education at the same faculty in 1969 and earned master's degree in Tafseer of the Qur'an with the thesis entitled Al-I'jaz Tashri'i li Al-Qur-an Al-Karim.

Upon returning to Makassar, Quraish served as the Vice Rector for Academic and Student Affairs at IAIN Alauddin, Ujung Pandang. In addition, he was also entrusted with other positions, both for academic positions such as the Coordinator of Private Higher Education Region VII in Eastern Indonesia, and non-academic positions such as the Assistant Police Chief of Eastern Indonesia in the field of mental development. While in Makassar, he also had time to do some researches. Some of his papers were "Implementation Harmony Religious Life in Eastern Indonesia" (1975) and "Problems Endowments South Sulawesi" (1978).

In 1980, Quraish Shihab returned to Cairo and continued his education at his old alma mater. In 1982, he earned his doctorate in the sciences of the Qur'an with the dissertation studying the method of al-Biqa'i (al-Biqa'i is a scholar of exegesis from Damascus in the 15th century) entitled The Research and Study of The Pearls System of al-Biqa'i ( Arabic: نظم الدرر للبقاعي – تحقيق ودراسة, romanized: Naẓami Al-Durar li al-Biqā'iy - tahqīq wa Dirāsah), where he graduated summa cum laude with first class honors (Arabic: ممتاز مع مرتبة الشرف العول, romanized: Mumtāz ma'a Martabat al-Sharaf al-'Ula).

== Career ==
In 1984, Quraish was assigned as a lecturer in the Ushuluddin faculty and postgraduate faculty at IAIN Syarif Hidayatullah, Jakarta. He was entrusted to positions at various departments: among others; the co-chairman of Indonesian Ulema Council (MUI) (since 1984); member of Lajnah Pentashih Qur'an at the Department of Religious Affairs (since 1989) and member of the Advisory Board of National Education (since 1989).

Quraish Shihab is also heavily involved in several professional organizations; he is a member of the Shari'ah Science Society; member of the Consortium of the Religions at the Ministry of Education and Culture, and is the Assistant Chief of the General Association of Indonesian Muslim Intellectuals (ICMI).

Quraish was appointed Indonesian Minister of Religious Affairs in 1998 for about two months, and later appointed The Indonesian Extraordinary and Plenipotentiary Ambassador to Egypt and accredited to Djibouti in Cairo from 1999 to 2002.

== Publications ==
Quraish has written since he was twenty two years old, with his first book was 60-pages book written in Arabic titled Al- Khawathir published in Egypt. He has written more than 30 books. Among them are:

- Tafsir Al-Manar: privileges and disadvantages (Ujung Pandang: IAIN Alauddin, 1984)
- Filsafat Hukum Islam (The Philosophy of Islamic Laws) (Jakarta: Department of Religion, 1987);
- Mahkota Tuntunan Ilahi (The Crown of Divine Guidance; a book on The Exegesis of Surah Al-Fatihah) (Jakarta: Untagma, 1988)
- Membumikan al-Qur'an (Earthing the Quran) (Bandung: Mizan, 1992). This book is one of the Best Seller that has sold for more than 75 thousand copies.
- Lentera Hati: Kisah dan Hikmah Kehidupan (Lantern of Heart: The Story and Lessons of Life) in 1994 (with multiple reprinted editions)
- Tafsir Al-Mishbah, a 15-volumes complete (30 juz) exegesis of the Qur'an (Jakarta: Lentera Hati)
- Wawasan Al-Qur'an: Tafsir Tematik Atas Pelbagai Persoalan Ummat (The insights of Koran: The thematic interpretation of various questions)
- Kaidah Tafsir (The Principles of Exegesis) (Lentera Hati, 2013), a book about methodologies and principles of Qur'anic interpretation.
- M. Quraish Shihab Menjawab pertanyaan Anak tentang Islam (Quraish Shihab Answering Children's questions about Islam) (Lentera Hati, 2014)

In addition to writing, he gives lectures in Islam-related programs at some television stations. Some popular programs, among other Kultum and Hikmah Fajar on RCTI, and Tafsir Al Mishbah in MetroTV.

== Recognitions and awards ==
Quraish has been mentioned as one of 500 of the most influential Muslims in the world in 2012 to 2015 by the Royal Islamic Strategic Studies Centre, a research entity affiliated with the Royal Aal al-Bayt Institute for Islamic Thought headquartered in Amman, Jordan. In 2009, he received the Islamic Book Fair (IBF) Award for his works in writing best-seller books. He received Lifetime Achievement Award in the same year from the Department of Islamic Theology of the Islamic State University of Jakarta on 12 November 2009.

== Controversies ==
Quraish Shihab issues some fatwas which are considered controversial or too liberal by many Muslims in Indonesia. In 1993, and again on December 6 of 2003, he issued a fatwa allowing Muslims to say Merry Christmas to the Christians and published on the Republika daily-newspaper.

Around the year 2006, he wrote a book titled "Jilbab Pakaian Wanita Muslimah" expressing his long held but controversial view that it is not obligatory for women to wear the hijab (veil), which clashed with opinions of many Islamic scholars. In the book he concludes that the verses in the Quran related to women's clothing have various interpretations, and said the legal provisions on the tolerable limit of female's aurah is zhanniy or a conjecture.

In the program Tafsir Al-Misbah on Metro TV broadcast on 12 July 2014, Quraish Shihab was accused of saying that Muhammad does not receive a guarantee from God to enter paradise. Quraish later clarified by saying Quraish Shihab explained that based on the hadith "no one enters heaven because of his deeds", he stated that the Companions asked, "Not even you?". The Apostle answered, "Neither do I, except for the grace of Allah upon me." According to him, good deeds are not the reason for going to heaven but that is God's prerogative.

== Honours ==
=== National ===
- Indonesia
  - Star of Mahaputera, 2nd Class (Indonesian: Bintang Mahaputera Adipradana) (2005)

=== Foreign honours ===
- Egypt
  - Grand Cordon of the Order of Sciences and Arts (2020)
