= Najwa Shihab =

Indonesian journalist

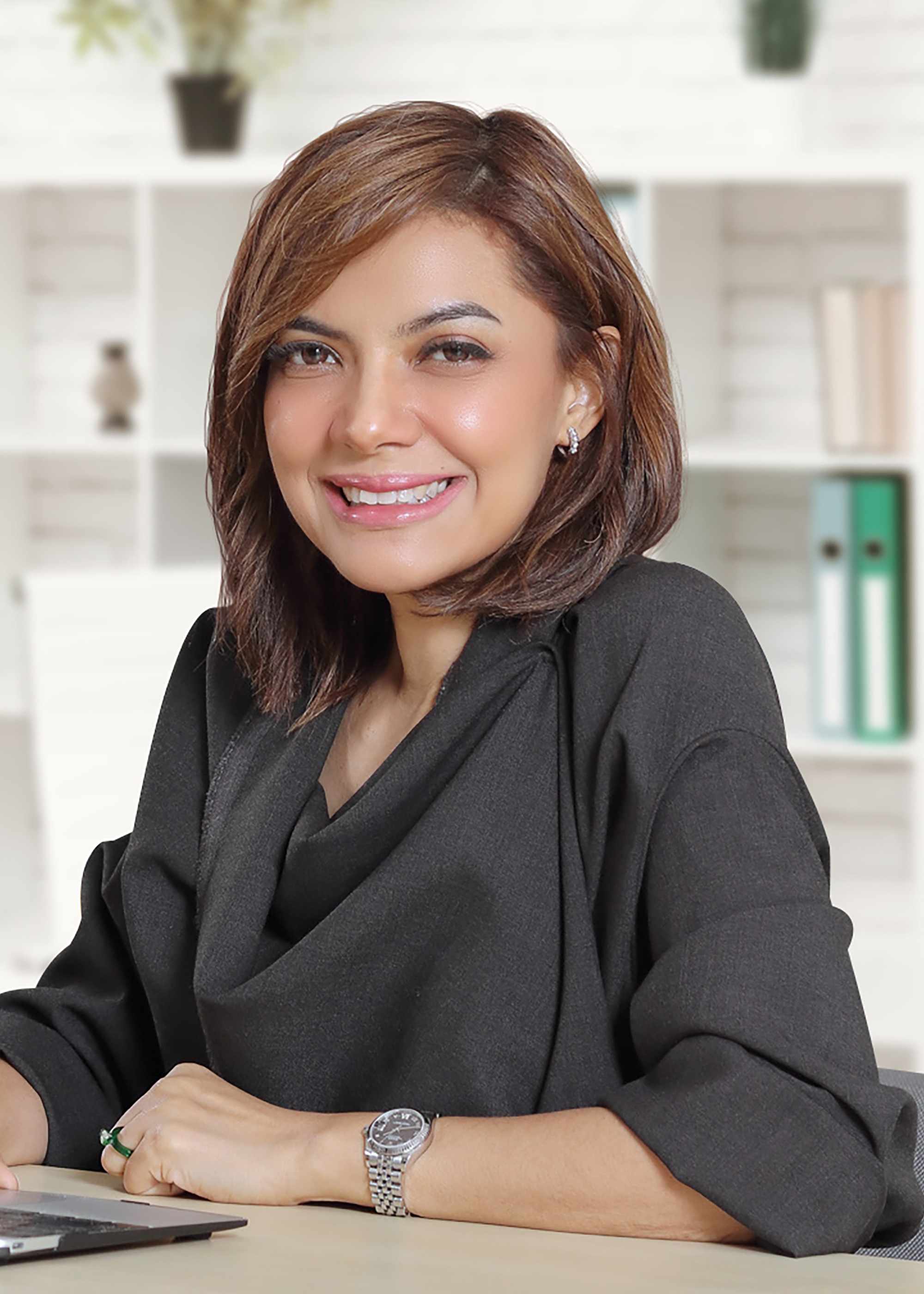
- Shihab in 2022
- Born: Ujung Pandang, South Sulawesi, Indonesia
- Education: University of Indonesia (S.H.); Melbourne Law School (LLM)
- Occupations: Journalist; presenter; actress
- Years active: 1999–present
- Spouse: Ibrahim Sjarief Assegaf (m. 1997; died 2025)
- Father: Quraish Shihab
- Relatives: Alwi Shihab (uncle)

Najwa Shihab is an Indonesian journalist, presenter and actress. She is of mixed Bugis and Arab descent and is the second daughter of the former Minister of Religious Affairs in the Seventh Development Cabinet Quraish Shihab, and a niece of the former Minister of Foreign Affairs Alwi Shihab.

== Early life ==
Shihab attended Jakarta High School No. 7 until 1996. During her time there, she was selected to join the American Field Service program where she got to stay in the United States for a year. Upon leaving high school, she started her law degree at Faculty of Law in University of Indonesia.

== Career ==
She started her journalistic career at RCTI in 1999 before joining the then recently established Metro TV in 2000. In the immediate aftermath of the 2004 tsunami, Shihab was flown to Aceh to file stories. There she witnessed the destruction caused by the tsunami alongside the decomposing bodies found all over the streets. Her reports and the interview with government officials raised her profile. She also received an award from the Indonesian Journalists Association for her reports.

In 2008, Shihab received an Australian Leadership Awards scholarship to study media law at the University of Melbourne.

After more than a decade at Metro TV, she quit the news channel in August 2017 and founded a news startup called Narasi TV in 2018.

In 2025, Shihab was recognized by the Global South World as one of the Top 50 most influential journalists on TikTok in Southeast Asia.

== Mata Najwa ==
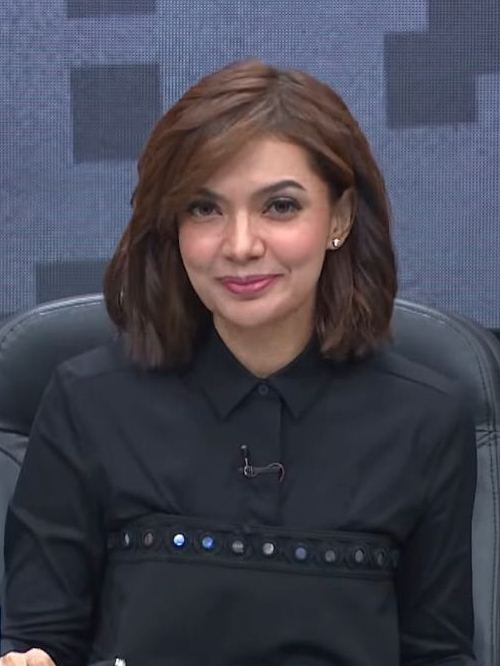
Najwa Shihab's talkshow program Mata Najwa currently airs on Trans7

Shihab started hosting her own talkshow Mata Najwa on Metro TV on 25 November 2009. It aired every Wednesday at 8pm WIB to 9.30pm WIB. Some of her guests included former presidents Habibie and Megawati Soekarnoputri, former vice presidents Boediono and Jusuf Kalla as well as then Jakarta governor Joko Widodo. Her show ended on 23 August 2017 on Metro TV as she decided to quit the channel. She and Mata Najwa returned to television but on a different channel, Trans7, on 10 January 2018.

=== Terawan interview ===
In October 2020, Shihab was reported to the police by United Jokowi Volunteers chairperson Silvia Devi Soembarto for her stunt interviewing an empty guest chair where Minister of Health Terawan Agus Putranto was supposed to fill on 28 September 2020 edition of Mata Najwa. Through her Instagram account, Shihab stated that her interview was intentional so that public officials, especially Terawan who has been missing in action, would explain their policies in handling the COVID-19 pandemic and that the explanation does not necessarily have to be made on her show.

The empty chair interview was a first in Indonesia and Shihab deemed her action as still a form of journalism as it has been done by journalists in the United Kingdom and the United States as well.
