= Barru Regency =

Regency in South Sulawesi, Indonesia

Coordinates: 3°14′36″S 119°40′53″E

Barru Regency Kabupaten Barru
- Regency
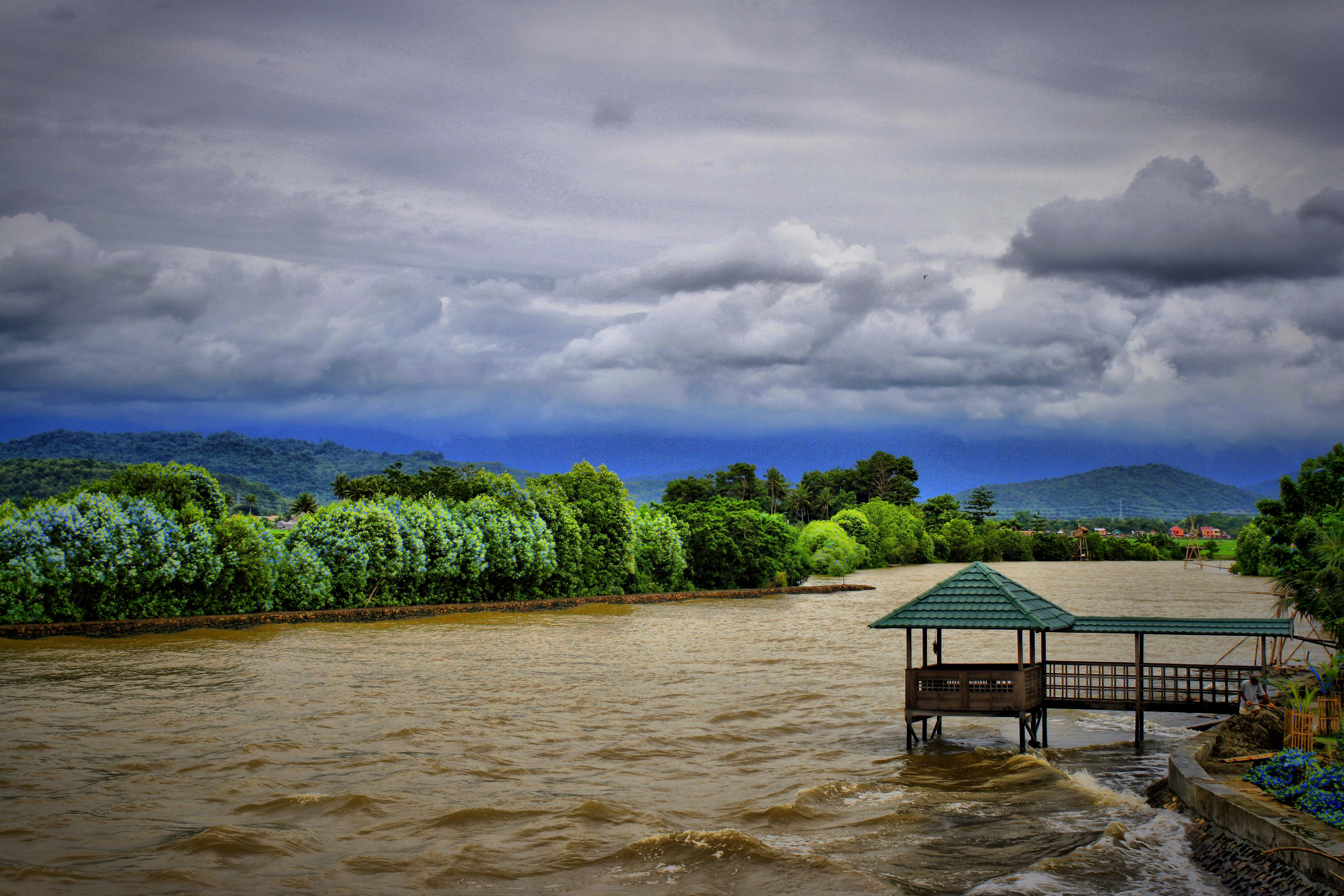
- A river in Barru

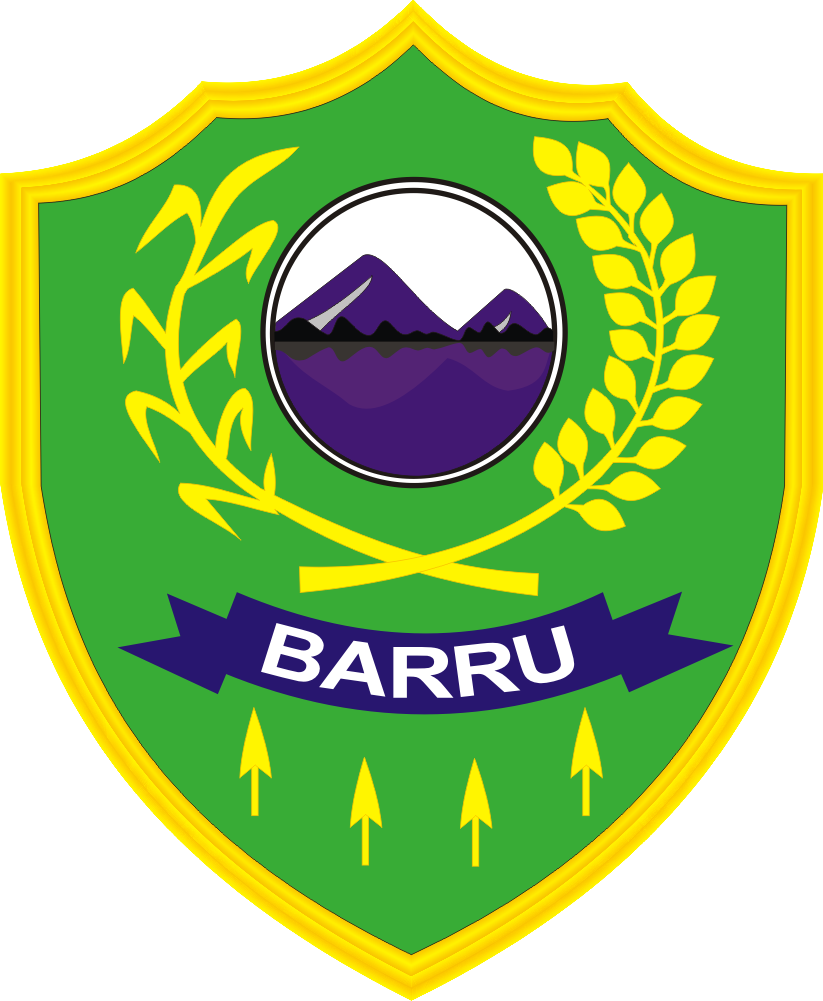
- Coat of arms
- Motto: HIBRIDAH (HIjau Bersih asRI dan inDAH)
- Location within South Sulawesi
- Country: Indonesia
- Province: South Sulawesi
- Capital: Barru

Government
  - Regent: Andi Ina Kartika Sari
  - Vice Regent: Abustan Andi Bintang

Area
  - Total: 1,201.32 km^{2} (463.83 sq mi)

Population (mid 2025 estimate)
  - Total: 196,258
  - Density: 163.369/km^{2} (423.123/sq mi)
- Time zone: UTC+8 (WITA)
- Area code: (+62) 427
- Website: http://barrukab.go.id

Barru Regency is a regency of South Sulawesi province of Indonesia. It covers a land area of 1,201.32 km^{2} and had a population of 165,983 at the 2010 Census and 184,452 at the 2020 Census. The official estimate of population as of mid 2025 was 196,258 (comprising 96,423 males and 99,835 females). The principal town lies at Barru.

Barru Regency is located between 4°05’49” and 4°47’35” South latitude, and between 119°35’00” and 119°49’16” East longitude. The regency has boundaries as follows:

- North – Parepare Municipality and Sidrap Regency;
- South – Pangkajene dan Kepulauan Regency;
- East – Soppeng Regency and Bone Regency;
- West – Makassar Strait

== History ==
The area now comprising Barry Regency previously covered four small kingdoms (each headed by a king), namely: the Kingdom of Berru (Barru), the Kingdom of Tanete, Royal Soppeng Riaja and the Kingdom of Mallusetasi. On 24 February 1960 the new regency of Barru came into being, with the capital at Barru, pursuant to Act No. 229 of 1959.

== Administration ==
Barru Regency in 2025, as in 2010, comprises seven administrative Districts (Kecamatan), tabulated below with their areas and their populations at the 2010 Census and at the 2020 Census, together with the official estimates as at mid 2025. The table also includes the locations of the district administrative centres, the number of administrative villages in each district (totaling 40 rural desa and 15 urban kelurahan), and its postal code(s).

Kode Wilayah	Name of District (kecamatan)	Area in km^{2}	Pop'n Census 2010	Pop'n Census 2020	Pop'n Estimate mid 2025	Admin centre	No. of villages	Post code
73.11.01	Tanete Riaja	174.29	21,899	25,217	26,808	Lompo Riaja	7 ^{(a)}	90763
73.11.06	Pujananting	314.26	12,785	13,104	14,068	Mattappawalie	7 ^{(b)}	90760
73.11.02	Tanete Rilau	79.17	32,763	37,196	39,995	Lalolang	10 ^{(c)}	90761 ^{(d)}
73.11.03	Barru	199.32	38,333	43,975	47,215	Sumpang Binangae	10 ^{(e)}	90711 & 90712
73.11.04	Soppeng Riaja	78.90	17,598	18,471	18,980	Mangkoso	7 ^{(f)}	90752
73.11.07	Balusu ^{(g)}	112.20	17,575	18,913	20,632	Takkalasi	6 ^{(h)}	90762
73.11.05	Mallusetasi	216.58	25,030	27,576	28,560	Palanro	8 ^{(j)}	90753 ^{(k)}
	Totals	1,201.32	165,983	184,452	196,258	Barru	55	

Notes: (a) including the kelurahan of Lompo Riaja. (b) including the kelurahan of Mattappawalie. (c) including the 2 kelurahan of Lalolang and Tanete.
(d) except the desa of Garessi, which has a post code of 90711. (e) comprising 5 kelurahan (Coppo, Mangempang, Sepee, Sumpang Binangae and Tuwung) and 5 desa.
(f) including the 2 kelurahan of Kiru-Kiru and Mangkoso. (g) including the offshore island of Pulau Pannikiang. (h) including the kelurahan of Takkalasi.
(j) including the 3 kelurahan of Bojo Baru, Mallawa and Palanro. (k) except the kelurahan of Mallawa, which has a post code of 90711.
