= Tafsir al-Mishbah =

2001 text by Muhammad Quraish Shihab

- Author: Muhammad Quraish Shihab
- Original title: تفسير المصباح
- Translator: Various
- Language: Arabic
- Subject: Qur'anic exegesis (Tafsir)
- Genre: Islamic literature
- Published: 2001
- Publication place: Indonesia
- Media type: Print (hardcover and paperback)
- Pages: 30 volumes

Tafsîr al-Mishbâh is the fifteen-volume tafsir by Indonesian Islamic scholar, Muhammad Quraish Shihab. Published by Lentera Hati in 2001, Tafsir al-Mishbah is the first complete 30 Juz interpretation of the Qur'an in the last 30 years. The tafsir is aimed at interpretation of the Qur'an in relations to contemporary issues.

== Naming ==
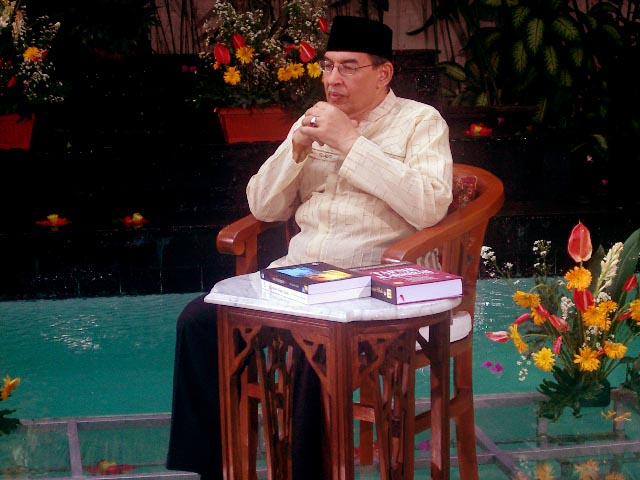
Quraish Shihab giving a lecture on TV.

Al-Mishbah means "lantern", which connotes the light of the Qur'an illuminating the meaning of life and matters of the people. The intent of the books is to preach the Qur'an in a more "grounded," easily understood manner.

== Content ==
The books begin by explaining the purposes of interpreting God's word in accordance with the cultural and conditional environment surrounding the person, and how science and the messages of the Qur'an can be extracted. They are intended to demonstrate that the majesty of God's word can accommodate all the different conditions in which people live. They also mention mufassir, who's demanded to explain the values which are in line with the development of society, so that the Qur'an can actually serve as a guide. There's also the issue of the separation between the haq (reality) and batil (vanity) and the way out for everyday problems human beings face, which is required as well for mufassir to remove the misunderstanding towards the Qur'an or the content of the verses.

An observer of the work of Nusantara interpretation, Howard M. Federspiel, believes that the works of Quraish Shihab commentary confidently assist contemporary Indonesian society in terms of religious issues.

== See also ==
- Islam Nusantara
