= Barru =

- Interactive map of Barru
- Coordinates: 4°21′31.32″S 119°38′23.7768″E
- Country: Indonesia
- Province: South Sulawesi
- Regency: Barru Regency
- Camat: Dr. Fachrul Islami

Area
  - Total: 199.32 km^{2} (76.96 sq mi)

Population (mid 2022 estimate)
  - Total: 44,817
  - Density: 224.85/km^{2} (582.36/sq mi)

Barru is a town and district (kecamatan) containing the administrative centre of Barru Regency in South Sulawesi province of Indonesia.

== Administration ==
As of 2010, Barru District comprises 10 villages, of which 5 are urban kelurahan and 5 rural desa. The kelurahan are Sumpang Binangae (population 10,735 in mid 2021), Mangempang (5,332), Coppo (4,576), Tuwung (3,951) and Sepee (2,964); the desa are Palakka (3,161), Siawung (3,114), Tompo (2,564), Galung (2,344), and Anabanua (2,201).
