= Andi Oddang (governor) =

Indonesian military officer and politician

Andi Oddang Makka
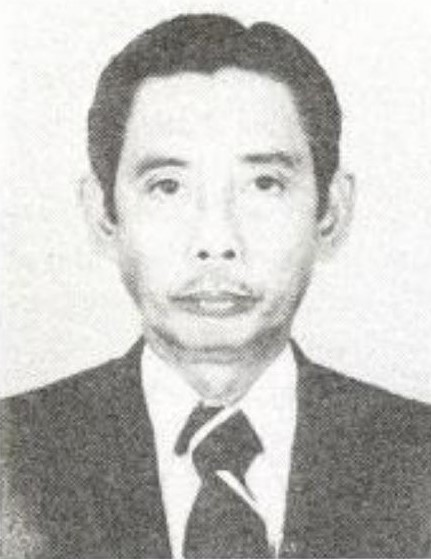

Governor of South Sulawesi
- In office 22 June 1978 – 22 June 1983
- President: Suharto
- Preceded by: Achmad Lamo
- Succeeded by: Ahmad Amiruddin

Personal details
- Born: 18 July 1925 Limpomajang Village, Barru, Sulawesi, Dutch East Indies
- Died: 10 February 2015 (aged 89) Siloam Hospital, Makassar, South Sulawesi, Indonesia
- Party: Golkar
- Parents: Makkarumpa Daeng Parani (father); I Sukkang Daeng Tommi (mother)

Military service
- Allegiance: Indonesia
- Branch/service: Indonesian Army
- Years of service: 1946–1981
- Rank: Brigadier General

Andi Oddang Makka (18 July 1925 – 10 February 2015) was an Indonesian military officer and politician who became the governor of South Sulawesi from 1978 to 1983.

== Early life ==
Oddang was born on 18 July 1925 at Limpomajang, a village located in Barru, South Sulawesi, to Makkarumpa Daeng Parani and I Sukkang Daeng Tommi. The second child in a Tallo aristocratic family, Oddang had eight other brothers and sisters, including Andi Mannaungi, Andi Rivai, Andi Ralle Ratu, Andi Tadjuddin, Andi Syafiuddin, Andi Makmur and Andi Sugiarti.

Oddang attended the People's School in Parepare and graduated from the school in 1941. However, due to the Japanese occupation of the Dutch East Indies a year later, he could not continue his education. He then fled to Surabaya along with eight other friends to the Javanese islands after the independence of Indonesia in order to get away from military pressure in Parepare.

== Military career ==
=== Indonesian National Revolution ===
After sailing for several days, Oddang and his friends arrived in Surabaya, where they were inaugurated as a naval officer with the rank of lieutenant in May 1946. His first assignment was to conduct intelligence operations and collect informations during the Battle of Surabaya.

Several years later, on 1 January 1947, the Dutch occupied Sidoarjo, a city near Surabaya, despite the fierce resistance delivered by Oddang's unit. After Mojokerto—another city near Sidoarjo—was also occupied on 17 March 1947, Oddang and his friends decided to switch their branch from the navy to the army. Oddang and his friends departed to Yogyakarta, the main base of the Indonesian Army, and underwent military training for three months. Only several of his friends, such as Eddy Sabara, managed to complete the entire training. Oddang then underwent airborne training and was deployed to Sulawesi for a military expedition.

The military expedition, which was described by Oddang as a "life or death voyage", started from Situbondo. Oddang and his crewmates had to evade Dutch patrol to prevent themselves from being caught. Oddang eventually reached the waters near South Sulawesi several days later, but his ships had to evade the Barang Lompo island, an island near the capital of South Sulawesi, due to the sheer amount of Dutch spies hiding in the island. Oddang finally reached Suppa, a small village in the Pinrang Regency, where he and his crewmates unloaded a 30 kilogram communication device. Oddang then rested for a while in the village and heard that his father had been shot by a unit led by Raymond Westerling on 14 January 1947.

After fighting with the Dutch, Oddang's company became part of the Worang Battalion, commanded by Hein Victor Worang. The battalion was deployed to Manado to prevent North Sulawesi from rejoining the State of East Indonesia. Several years later, the battalion was deployed to Maluku to crush the Republic of South Maluku separatist movement.

=== Post-revolution ===
Oddang was assigned to the Hasanuddin (South Sulawesi) Military Regional Command in 1953, where he became the commander of the 717th Battalion. Oddang was transferred again to the Tanjungpura (Central Kalimantan) Military Regional Command in 1958 and began his career as assistant for operations to the military region's commander. He held various commands in the military region, becoming the commander of the 1202 and 1203 military district and the 121 military resort. Oddang ended his tenure in the military region in 1968 and was instructed to attend the Indonesian Army Command and General Staff College.

After finishing his education in the college, Oddang returned to the Hasanuddin Military Regional Command and became the commander of the military region's regional training regiment. Oddang was promoted in 1973 to become the deputy chief of staff of the military region and in 1975 as the chief of staff. During his tenure as chief of staff, Oddang forcefully took over 150 hectares of land in the Bonto Mangiring village for the housing of 43 Hasanuddin military region officers and 350 hectares of land in the Swatani Village for the housing of 150 soldiers. The take over was conducted with the approval of Achmad Lamo, the incumbent governor at that time and Malik Hambali, the incumbent regent at that time.

While serving as the governor of South Sulawesi, Oddang was promoted from colonel to brigadier general in 1980.

== Governor of South Sulawesi ==
=== Appointment as governor ===
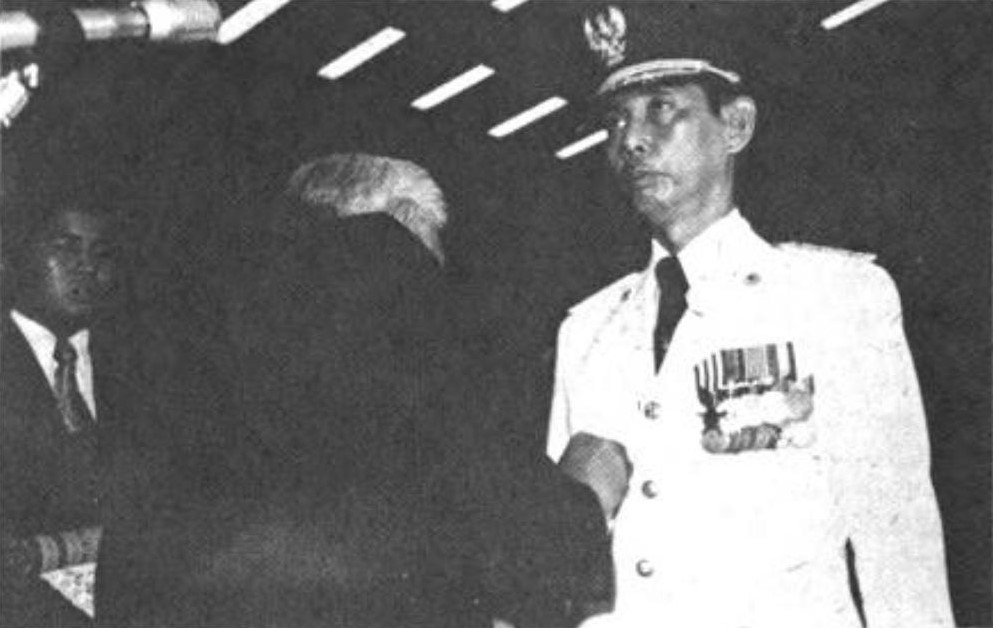
Inauguration of Andi Oddang as Governor of South Sulawesi

As the second term of Governor Achmad Lamo grew closer to an end, the Corhas (Corps Hasanuddin) organization, an organization filled with retired Hasanuddin Military Regional Command officers and Golkar, the ruling party, wanted him to be succeeded by Abdul Azis Bustam and Chaeruddin Tasning. Lamo himself wanted to be succeeded by Oddang, who was regarded as a person from high noble background and was less popular and less highly regarded from the two. However, President Suharto decided to support Oddang as Oddang also gained strong support from the Research Minister, B. J. Habibie, who maintained a close relationship with Oddang's clan. Bustam and Tasning was made as ambassador, and a sham election was held to legitimize Oddang's ascension into the governor's seat. At the election held on 22 March 1978, Oddang obtained 20 out of 35 votes, while the government-approved puppet candidates Andi Mochtar and Daud Nompo got 8 and 7 votes respectively. Oddang was sworn in as the governor exactly three months later by Maraden Panggabean.

=== Agricultural project ===
In the beginning of his tenure Oddang executed the transition of corn variety from white corn to yellow corn. The project, which started in 1978, was completed a year later.

Several years later, Oddang initiated the Lapo Ase (heaps of paddy) operation to increase the output of paddy fields in the region. Oddang announced his plans to initiate the project in 1980 and again on 18 March 1981. The project officially started a month later in conjunction with similar projects across Indonesia. The project initially covered the Bulukumba, Sinjai, and Bone regencies, but was expanded later to encompass the entire province. Through the project, Oddang aimed at a 11% increase of paddy field output to 3.5 million tonnes of milled dry rice in 1982. He also boasted that the operation would make the province as the "food barn" of the Eastern Indonesia region.

Other agricultural hallmarks during his tenure were the establishment of the first seed processing unit in the Eastern Indonesia region located in Sidrap on 23 August 1981, the first successful hybrid coconut in the province on 28 January 1982, and the first successful harvest using the gogo rancah method on 25 March 1982.

=== Cement scarcity ===
During his tenure, South Sulawesi experienced a shortage of cement due to the breakdown of the Tonasa cement factory, the main cement factory in the region. The shortage caused most of construction projects in the region to be delayed. Oddang handled the shortage by instructing the trade bureau of the province to secure 25,000 cement sacks for members of the Indonesian Contractors Association that were working on state and provincial projects in the region.

=== End of term ===
At the end of his term, Oddang declared that the gross domestic product per capita of South Sulawesi had grown by 6.11 percent every year during his tenure. Oddang was replaced by Ahmad Amiruddin on 22 June 1983.

== Later life ==
=== Army and veteran organization ===
Oddang had been active in army and veteran organizations since before his retirement from the armed forces, with him holding the chairman of the 45' Generation in West Kalimantan from 1960 until 1963. After his retirement, Oddang became member of the Veterans' Legion of Indonesia, where he became the chairman of the organization's chapter in South Sulawesi and member of the plenary board of the legion from 1999 until his death.

=== Death ===
Oddang died at 11.30 on 10 February 2015 in the Makassar Siloam Hospital after reaching critical point two hours before. Prior to his death, Oddang had suffered from a virus that affected his kidney. Oddang also went unconscious and was treated for a month before his death.

Oddang was buried a day later with a military funeral led by the vice president of Indonesia, Jusuf Kalla. A total of four bus were prepared for funeral attendees and several roads that passed by Oddang's casket hearse were temporarily closed.

== Awards ==
- Star of Guerilla
- Army Meritorious Service Star (Bintang Kartika Eka Pakçi)
- Veterans' Legion of Indonesia Star (Bintang LVRI)
- Star "50 Years of the 45' Generation" (Bintang 50 tahun Angkatan 45)
- Jasmine Badge (Lencana Melati) from the Gerakan Pramuka Indonesia (1987)

== Personal life ==
Oddang was married to Rastinah Lahade. After Lahade died in 1975, Oddang married again with Andi Mamminanga. His second wife died on 9 November 2014, several months before he died.

Through his marriage, Oddang had four sons, namely Irvan, Taufan, Akbar, and Siradjuddin.
