= Fathurrahman Kafrawi =

Indonesian politician

Kyai Haji Fathurrahman Kafrawi
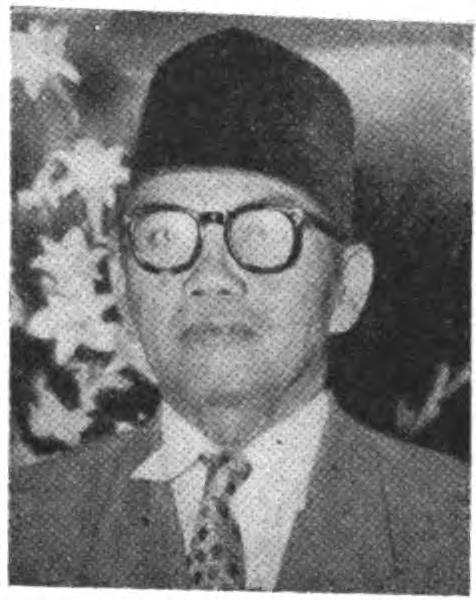

3rd Indonesian Minister of Religious Affairs
- In office 2 October 1946 – 3 July 1947
- President: Sukarno
- Preceded by: Hadji Rasjidi
- Succeeded by: Kyai Achmad Asj'ari

Personal details
- Born: 1901
- Died: 1969 (aged 68)

K.H. Fathurrahman Kafrawi (1901–1969) was the Minister of Religion in Indonesia from 1946 to 1947. He was with Abdul Kahar Muzakkir also instrumental in establishing the College of Islamic and turned it into Islamic University of Indonesia, UIN Sunan Kalidjaga Yogyakarta, and UIN Syarif Hidayatullah Jakarta.
