= Haluoleo University =

Public university in Kendari, Indonesia

Halu Oleo University
- Universitas Halu Oleo
- Type: Public
- Established: 19 August 1981
- Affiliations: ASAIHL
- Rector: Prof. Dr. Muhammad Zamrun F., S.Si., M.Si., M.Sc
- Location: Kampus Bumi Tridharma Anduonohu, Jalan H.E.A. Mokodompit, Kendari, Southeast Sulawesi, Indonesia; 4.00881°S 122.52268°E
- Campus: Sub-urban
- Colors: Yellow
- Website: www.uho.ac.id

Haluoleo University (Indonesian: Universitas Haluoleo or Universitas Halu Oleo) is a public university in Kendari, Southeast Sulawesi, Indonesia. It was established on August 19, 1981. Its current rector is Muhammad Zamrun F.

== Faculties ==
The university has 17 faculties, a vocational program, and postgraduate program. The faculties are:

1. Faculty of Teacher Training and Education
2. Faculty of Economics and Business
3. Faculty of Social and Political Sciences
4. Faculty of Agriculture
5. Faculty of Mathematics and Natural Science
6. Faculty of Engineering
7. Faculty of Law
8. Faculty of Fishery and Marine Science
9. Faculty of Public Health
10. Faculty of Medicine
11. Faculty of Animal Husbandry
12. Faculty of Forestry and Environmental Science
13. Faculty of Humanities Studies
14. Faculty of Pharmacy
15. Faculty of Agricultural Technology and Science
16. Faculty of Geoscience and Technology
17. Faculty of Administration Science
