= Rasjidi =

Indonesian diplomat (1915–2001)

Mohamad Rasjidi
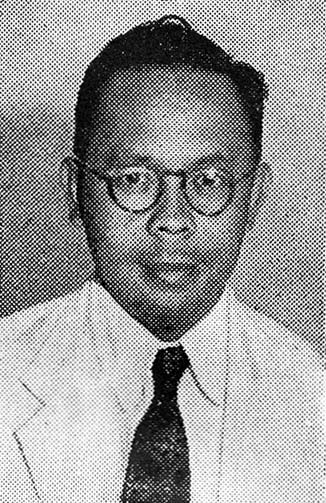

2nd Minister of Religious Affairs
- In office November 14, 1945 – October 2, 1946
- President: Sukarno
- Preceded by: Wahid Hasyim
- Succeeded by: Fathurrahman Kafrawi

Personal details
- Born: May 20, 1915 Kotagede, Yogyakarta, Indonesia
- Died: January 30, 2001 (aged 85) Jakarta, Indonesia
- Party: Masyumi

Mohamad Rasjidi (May 20, 1915 in Kotagede, Yogyakarta, Indonesia – January 30, 2001) was a Minister of Religious Affairs of Indonesia at the First Sjahrir Cabinet and Second Sjahrir Cabinet. He was the first Minister of Religious Affairs of Indonesia.

He was the first Chairman of the Indonesian diplomatic envoy who followed Egyptian diplomats who visited the capital city of Yogyakarta in 1947.
