= Ahmad Azhary =

Indonesian kyai and politician (1900 – 1969)

Kyai Hajji Ahmad Azhary
- أحمد أزهري،
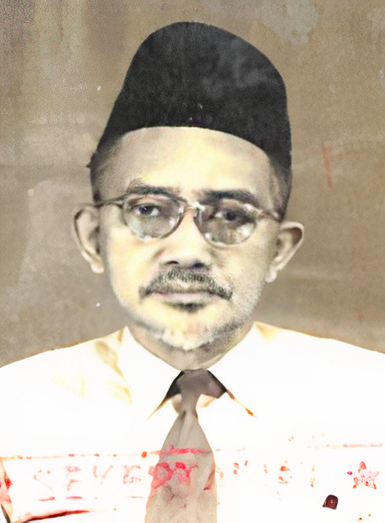
- Official portrait, 1956

Member of the Constitutional Assembly
- In office 9 November 1956 – 5 July 1959
- Constituency: South Sumatra

Member of the People's Representative Council
- In office 12 February 1950 – 23 March 1956
- Constituency: South Sumatra

4th Minister of Religious Affairs
- In office 3 July 1947 – 9 October 1947
- President: Sukarno
- Prime Minister: Amir Sjarifuddin Harahap
- Preceded by: Fathurrahman Kafrawi
- Succeeded by: H. Anwaruddin

Personal details
- Born: Ahmad Azhary; Around c. 1900 Palembang, Dutch East Indies
- Died: 1969 (aged 68–69) Jakarta, Indonesia
- Cause of death: Pneumonia
- Party: Masyumi (1950 onwards); Indonesian Islamic Union Party (1937 – 1942; 1945 – 1950)
- Spouse: 2
- Children: 5
- Parent: Abdul Hamid (father)
- Education: Al Azhar University
- Occupation: Kyai; politician

Ahmad Azhary (Note: There are a plethora of ways to spell his name, including as Ahmad Asj'ari, Achmad Asj'ari, and Achmad Azhary.) (1900–1969) was an Indonesian kyai and politician from South Sumatra. A leading religious scholar from the city of Palembang, he was active in Indonesian politics during the Indonesian National Revolution and the later Liberal democracy period in the country. During his time in government, he was appointed to fill the office of Minister of Religious Affairs in the First Amir Sjarifuddin Cabinet, though he never assumed the post. In addition to being appointed minister, he was a member of both the national legislature and the constitutional assembly during the 1950s.

Born as the only son of a family of traders, Azhary was educated abroad in Egypt, attending Al Azhar University in Cairo. After seven years abroad, he returned to the Dutch East Indies, and founded his own school in 1934. A few years after his return, he became involved in the Indonesian Islamic Union Party (PSII). Following the proclamation of independence and the beginning of the National Revolution in 1945, Azhary strongly supported the cause of independence. In 1947, he was appointed Minister of Religious Affairs by Prime Minister Amir Sjarifuddin, but he was unable to take office. As he had been arrested by Dutch authorities. After the end of the National Revolution, he moved to Jakarta to join national politics full-time.

In 1950, he became a member of the national legislature, serving as a member in two iterations of body. In 1951, he became a member of the Madjelis Sjuro (Consultative Council of religious scholars) of the Masyumi Party. Azhary was then elected to the Constitutional Assembly in 1955. He left politics in 1960, and began to teaching at Ibn Khaldun University in Jakarta. He was known as an active smoker, and tobacco contributed to his poor health later in life. He died of pneumonia in February 1969.
