= Rappang =

- Village
- Location in Sulawesi
- Coordinates: 3.844712°S 119.820529°E
- Country: Indonesia
- Province: South Sulawesi
- Regency: Sidenreng Rappang Regency
- District: Panca Rijang District
- Elevation: 37 m (121 ft)

Population (2010)
  - Total: 27,116
- Total population in Panca Rijang District
- Time zone: WITA (UTC+08:00)
- Postal Code: 91651
- Area code: 0421

Rappang is a small town in the Panca Rijang District, Sidenreng Rappang Regency in South Sulawesi, Indonesia. The village is located 32.7 kilometres (20.3 mi) north east of Pare-Pare.

== History ==
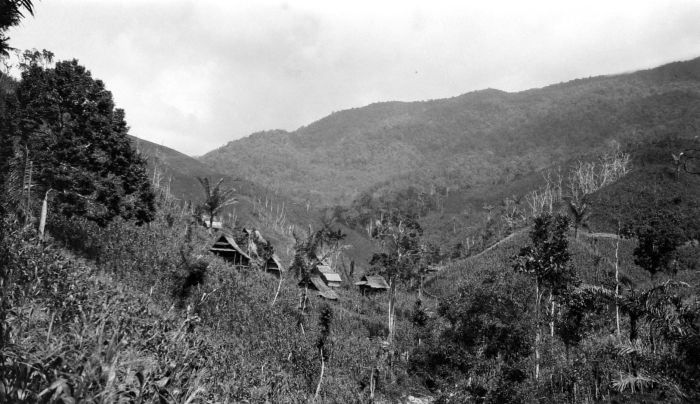

The word Rappang is derived from the Buginese word Rappeng, means a washed away branch/twig. In the ancient times, the Saddang river flowing in Rappang was quite wide and had great torrent with a dense wood in the upstream. When the rainy season had arrived, the branches of the trees were washed away and formed the mainland, became a place of settlement and later was named Rappang.

=== The Kingdoms ===
Historically, there were two kingdoms, one was Sidenreng kingdom and another one was Rappang. Both kingdoms were very intimate, so it is hard to find clear demarcation. Even in matters of royal reigns, both could co-exist. Many Times, the tribal chief of Sidenreng took the seat of the Rappang kingdom and vice versa. People in two kingdoms used the same dialect and daily conversational language was also similar. The main difference is its geographical location. Rappang region occupied the northern position, while the kingdom of Sidenreng located in the southern part.

At the time of recognition of the sovereignty of the Republik Indonesia by the Netherlands on December 27, 1949, both the Kingdom of Rappang and Sidenreng also ended. During the time, the kingdom of Sidenreng was one of the earliest to indicate its nationalism by giving up its kingdom system, although the system had been long with 21 times changes of leaders. They chose to change and blend into Indonesian state administration system. The kingdoms eventually melt into Sidenreng Rappang Regency, with its first regent was H. Andi Sapada Mapangile. On October 29, 2008 people of Sidenreng and Rappang direct-voted their bupati for the first time.
