= Tarmizi Taher =

Indonesian politician

6th Ambassador of Indonesia to Norway and Iceland
- In office 1999 – May 2002
- President: B. J. Habibie; Abdurrahman Wahid; Megawati Soekarnoputri
- Preceded by: Amiruddin Noor
- Succeeded by: Hatanto Reksodiputro

15th Minister of Religious Affairs
- In office 19 March 1993 – 11 March 1998
- President: Soeharto
- Preceded by: Munawir Sjadzali
- Succeeded by: Quraish Shihab

Personal details
- Born: October 7, 1936 Padang, Sumatera Barat, Hindia Belanda
- Died: February 12, 2013 (aged 76) Jakarta
- Spouse: Ny. Djusma
- Children: 4
- Parent(s): Taher Marah Soetan (ayah); Djawanis (ibu)
- Education: Airlangga University
- Occupation: Physician, Islamic Scholar
- Profession: Military Officer

Military service
- Allegiance: Indonesia
- Branch/service: Indonesian Navy
- Rank: Rear Admiral
- Unit: Medical Corps

Rear Admiral (Ret.) Dr. (H.C.) H. Tarmizi Taher, MD (7 October 1936 – 12 February 2013) was Indonesia's Minister of Religious Affairs from 1993 to 1998. After qualifying as a medical doctor, he started his career in the Indonesian Navy and retired with the rank of rear admiral. He then served as General Secretary of the Department of Religious Affairs for 5 years, before being appointed as Minister in 1993. After leaving his ministerial position, Taher has held other public appointments, including Indonesian ambassador to Norway and Iceland. He has served as the elected chairman of Dewan Masjid Indonesia (Indonesian Mosque Council), an umbrella organization of local Mosque councils, the president of Az-zahra Islamic University in Jakarta, and the president director of Center for Moderate Moslem (CMM), a non-governmental organization aiming at improving understanding and cooperation among Islamic organizations. He was honored with Gusi Peace Prize from Philippines for his engagement in religious affairs.

== Biography ==
Taher was born in Padang, West Sumatra. Upon graduating from one of the top medical schools in Indonesia, Airlangga University, he joined the navy and was assigned to various warships as medical officer. His path changed from medicine toward mental and religious affairs when he was appointed as the head of navy mental up-building agency, overseeing all chaplains in the navy. Shortly after that, he was promoted as head of Armed Forces Mental Up-building Center with the rank of rear admiral, overseeing all mental upbuilding activities in entire Indonesian military. He ended his military career when he was promoted to the post of General Secretary of the Department of Religious Affairs and later was appointed as a minister in the Cabinet.

During his time as Minister of Religious Affairs, Taher implemented several initiatives especially related to managing the Indonesian Hajj pilgrimage which dispatches close to 200,000 pilgrims yearly. Those initiatives included the introduction of several computer systems, including SISKOHAT (Integrated Hajj Coordination System), a computer network for handling all activities related to Hajj. Similarly, he was responsible for the introduction of Dana Abadi Umat (DAU), a fund for helping Islamic education, and Dawah in Indonesia. DAU, started in 1996, and was funded through efficiencies in managing the organization of Indonesian pilgrims. From 1996 through 2004, DAU has successfully collected more than $70,000,000 and has spent a huge amount of money in helping Islamic education, dawa, and other Islamic activities in Indonesia. Taher was also active in promoting understanding among different religions in Indonesia to avoid any religion-based conflict in the country and in bridging communication among religions in the world.

After leaving the cabinet, Taher was appointed as Indonesian ambassador to Norway and Iceland. He ended his service in Oslo, Norway in 2002. He has also served as the President of Az-zahra Islamic University in Jakarta from 2004 through 2008 and as the elected chairman of Dewan Masjid Indonesia (Indonesian Mosque Council) from 2006 through 2011. He also holds a position of President Director of Center for Moderate Muslim (CMM), an organisation that promotes understanding among various Muslim organisations. He was awarded Doctor honoris causa in Islamic Dawah from Jakarta Islamic State University (UIN) for his involvement in dawa.

Taher was an active writer and has published various books on health and Islamic study. He is also active in campaign against AIDS and drug abuse.

Taher died aged 76 in February 2013

To honor his service as an Indonesian Navy medical doctor as well as his other services to the country, the Navy hospital in Padang, West Sumatra, was named after him.
