= Abdul Malik Fadjar =

Indonesian politician (1939–2020)

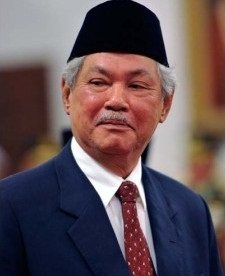
Photo of Abdul Malik Fadjar

Abdul Malik Fadjar (22 February 1939 – 7 September 2020) was an Indonesian politician who served as Minister of Religious Affairs.
