= Sidenreng Rappang Regency =

Regency in South Sulawesi, Indonesia

Sidenreng Rappang Regency Kabupaten Sidenreng Rappang
- Regency

Other transcription(s)
  - Lontara: ᨀᨅᨘᨄᨈᨙ ᨔᨗᨉᨙᨋᨙᨑᨄ
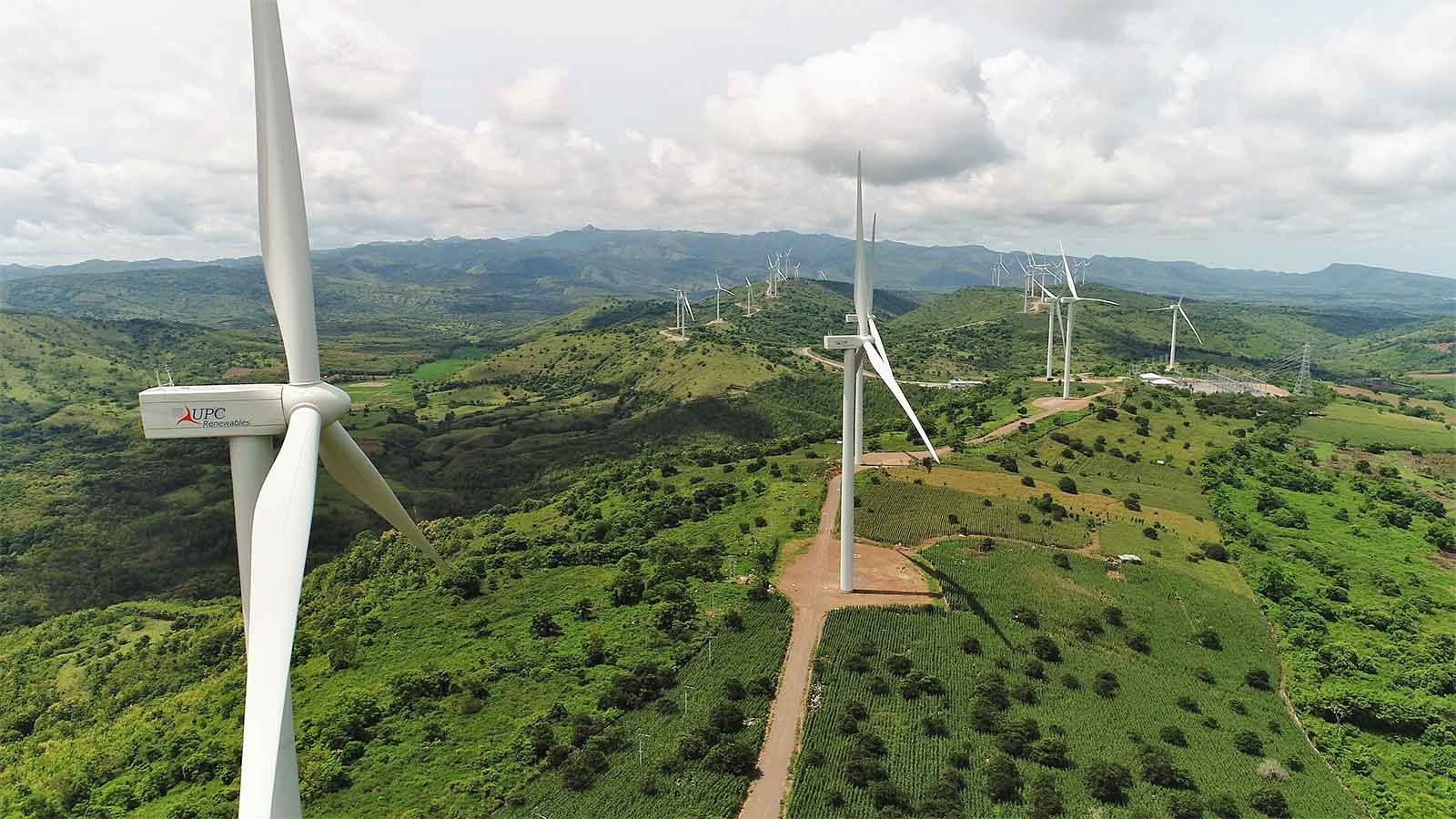
- Sidrap wind farm

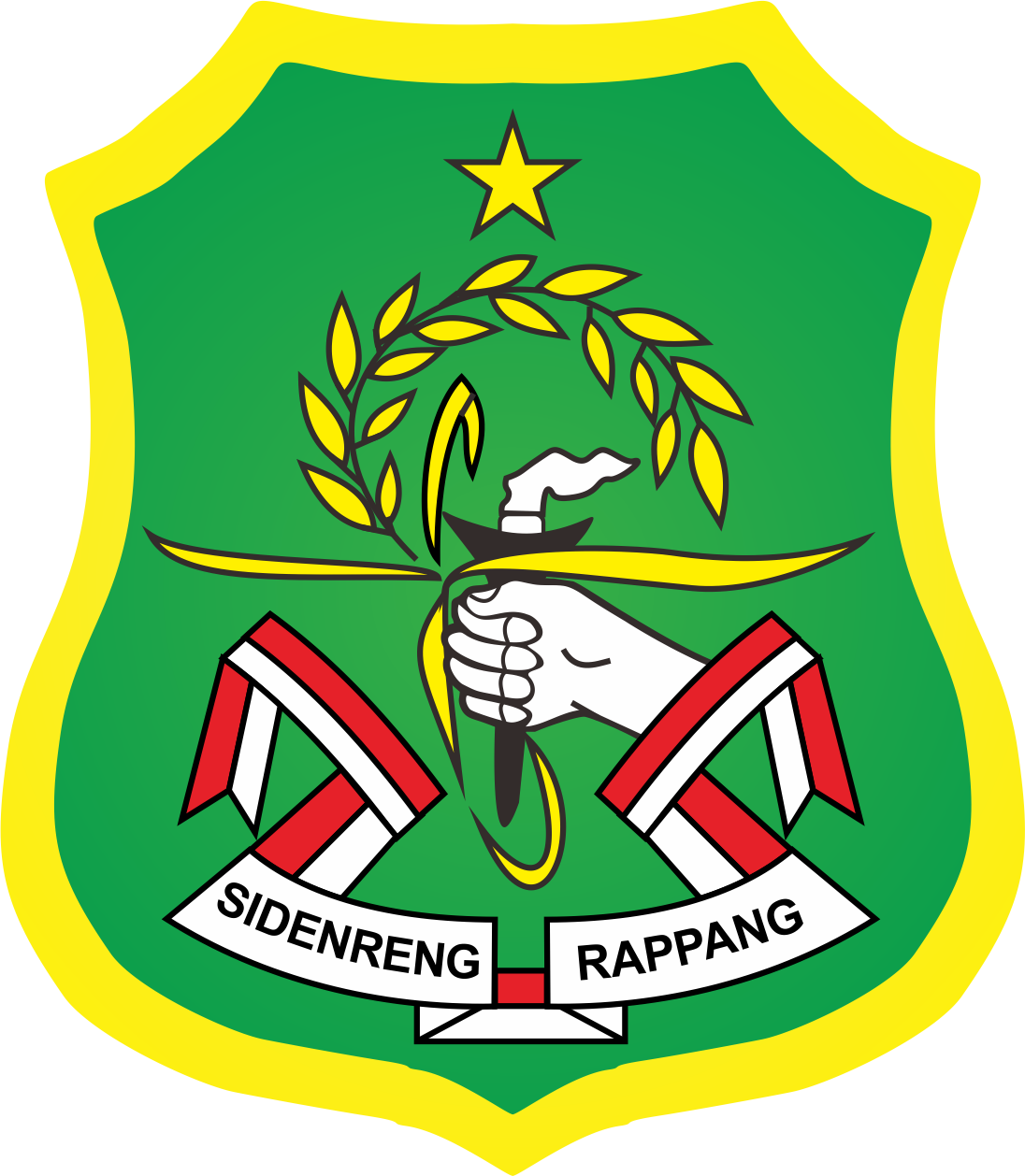
- Coat of arms
- Motto: Resopa Tammangingngi Malomo Nalatei Pammase Dewata
- Location within South Sulawesi

- Location in Sulawesi Location in Indonesia
- Coordinates: 3°55′37″S 119°47′47″E
- Country: Indonesia
- Province: South Sulawesi
- Capital: Pangkajene Sidenreng

Government
  - Regent: Syaharuddin Alrif
  - Vice Regent: Nur Kana'ah

Area
  - Total: 1,883.23 km^{2} (727.12 sq mi)

Population (mid 2025 estimate)
  - Total: 338,220
  - Density: 179.60/km^{2} (465.15/sq mi)
- Time zone: UTC+8 (ICST)
- Area code: (+62) 421
- Website: sidrapkab.go.id

Sidenreng Rappang Regency (the name is often abbreviated to "Sidrap") is a landlocked regency (kabupaten) of South Sulawesi Province in Indonesia. It has an area of 1,883.23 kilometres (1,170.18 mi) and had a population of 271,911 at the 2010 Census and 319,990 at the 2020 Census; the official estimate as at mid 2025 was 338,220 (comprising 167,368 males and 170,852 females). Its capital is at the town of Pangkajene Sidenreng. The original inhabitants of this area are Bugis.

== History ==
Sidenreng Rappang conducted its first direct elections for district heads on 29 October 2008.

== Sidenreng and Rappang ==
Sidenreng Rappang originally consisted of two Bugis kingdoms, Sidenreng and Rappang. It was difficult to find the boundary between them. Often those from one community served in the other community. They speak the same language with slightly different dialects. The Sidenreng region occupies the southern position, while Rappang is in the north, and includes the geographically large but relatively less densely populated northeast, which comprises the three districts listed last in the table below - covering 1,125.19 km^{2} (60% of the regency's area) but with just 91,078 inhabitants in 2025 (27.9% of the regency population).

== Topography ==
Rappang Sidenreng lies at an altitude between 10 m - 1500 m from sea level. State of the topography in this area varies between a flat area covering 879.85 km^{2} (46.72%) in the west, a hilly area of 290.17 km^{2} (15.43%) and a mountainous area of 712.81 km^{2} (37.85%) in the northeast. The largest northeastern district (Pitu Riase District) is very underpopulated.

== Economy ==
Sidenreng Rappang is a center of rice production in South Sulawesi. It is mainly supported by a network of technical irrigation to irrigate rice fields throughout the year. Some of the existing irrigation network in Sidenreng Rappang include: Irrigation Fur Cenrana, irrigate 6,000 hectares of paddy When the irrigation network, irrigate 5,400 hectares of paddy Irrigation Fur Timoreng, irrigate 5,400 hectares of paddy In addition to the major producer of rice in eastern Indonesia, the area is also a major producer of chicken eggs and duck eggs outside Java. Other agricultural commodities are cocoa, copra, cashew and kemiriserta forest products such as wood and rattan.

=== Services and Industry ===
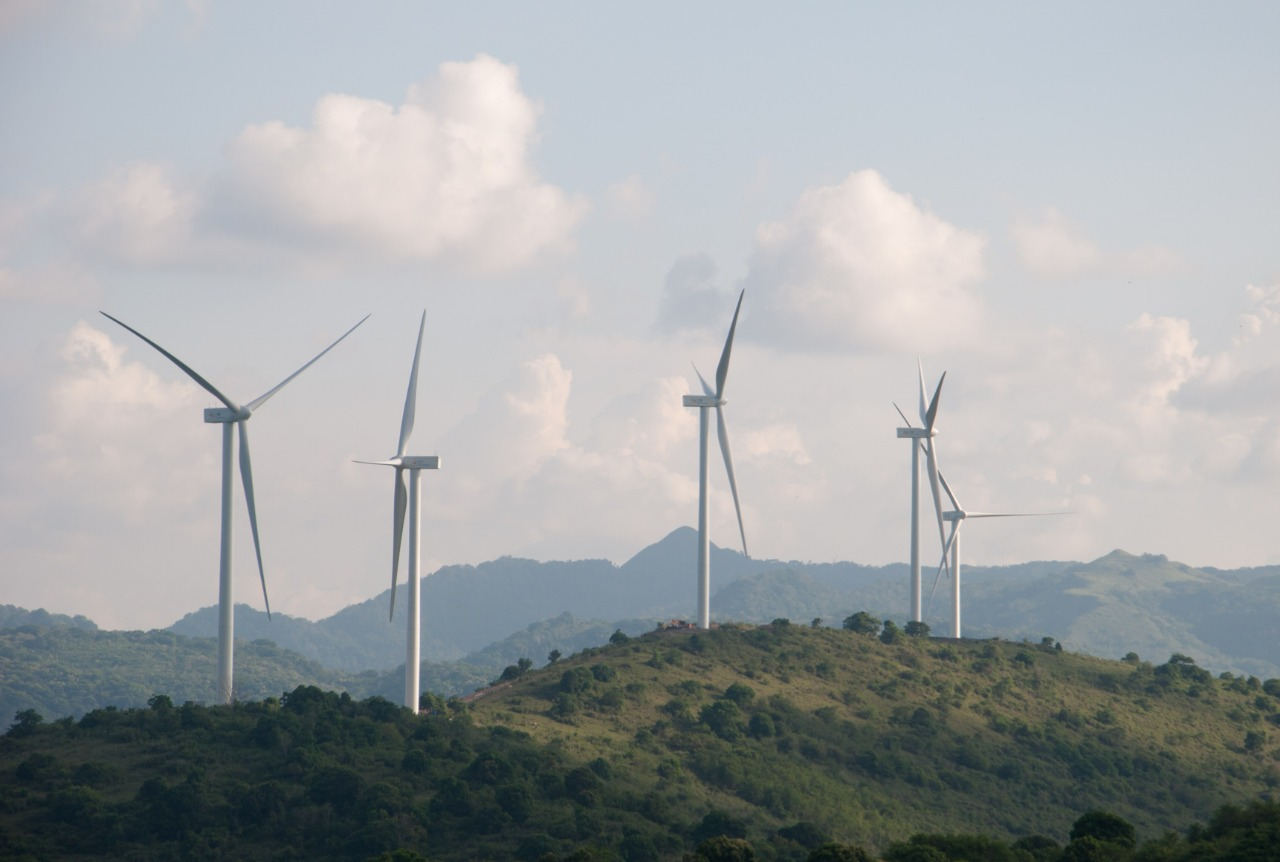
Sidrap wind farm, Indonesia's first wind power plant, in Sidrap Regency.

Industrial development is concentrated on small-scale industries, medium and cottage industries ( home industry ), the main target is still limited to the share of inter- regional or inter pasaar island. The development of the industrial sector increased empowerment through education, workforce training, and creating a business climate conducive to stimulate investors to support the industrial sector, both in the field of marketing and capital.

Industrial sector as one of the economic sectors is still potential for development, which is affecting the economic sector as well as to drive the development of other sectors. Industrisebagai sector development sectors absorb considerable manpower especially Small Industrial Enterprises ( SMEs ) which could affect the development process of the region, where the leading industrial sector will grow faster.

The 75MW Sidrap Wind Farm, which opened in 2018, is Indonesia's first wind farm.

=== Profile and Status Sub Project ===
In the Financial Management reform agenda outline there are eight (8) steps in implementation:

1. Preparation of Action Plan Formulation and Implementation in Financial Management Reform.
2. Institutional Development and Legal Basis of Financial Management.
3. Planning and Implementation Regional Budget.
4. Monitoring the Implementation of the Regional Budget.
5. Revenue Management.
6. Regions Financial Reporting and Accountability.
7. Financial Management Capacity.
8. Development of Regional Financial Information System.

== Administrative districts ==
Sidenreng Rappang Regency comprises eleven administrative Districts (Kecamatan), tabulated below with their areas and their populations at the 2010 Census and the 2020 Census, together with the official estimates as at mid 2025. The table also includes the locations of the district administrative centres, the number of administrative villages in each district (comprising 68 rural desa and 38 urban kelurahan), and its post code(s).

Kode Wilayah	Name of District (kecamatan)	Area in km^{2}	Pop'n Census 2010	Pop'n Census 2020	Pop'n Estimate mid 2025	Admin centre	No. of desa	No. of kelurahan	Post code(s)
73.14.01	Panca Lautang	153.93	17,241	19,179	19,234	Bilokka	7	3	91672
73.14.02	Tellu Limpoe	103.20	22,728	25,728	26,907	Amparita	3	6	91662
73.14.03	Watang Pulu	151.31	30,128	37,186	40,202	Uluale	5	5	91661
73.14.04	Baranti	53.89	28,068	33,256	33,922	Baranti	4	5	91652 & 91653
73.14.05	Panca Rijang	34.02	27,086	31,808	33,847	Rappang	4	4	91651
73.14.06	Kulo	75.00	11,345	13,939	14,616	Kulo	6	-	91653
73.14.07	Maritengngae	65.90	46,139	54,291	57,048	Pangkajene	7	5	91611^{(a)}
73.14.08	Watang Sidenreng	120.81	17,051	20,201	21,366	Empagae	5	3	91613^{(b)}
73.14.10	Pitu Riawa	210.43	24,980	29,663	32,334	Otting	10	2	91683
73.14.09	Dua Pitue	69.99	27,272	31,389	33,717	Tanru Tedong	8	2	91681
73.14.11	Pitu Riase	844.77	19,873	23,350	25,027	Barukku	11	1	91691
	Totals	1,883.23	271,911	319,990	326,330	Pangkajene	68	38	

Notes: (a) except the desa of Sereang, which has a post code of 91615. (b) except the kelurahan of Watang Sidenreng, which has a post code of 91682, and the desa of Mojong (post code 91614) and of Damai (post code 91616).

== Social Culture ==
=== Education ===
There are educational facilities throughout Rappang Sidenreng Regency, which means that there ranging from the level of kindergarten, elementary school, junior high, and high school.

=== Health ===
Availability of health facilities such as hospitals, health centers, health centers (Pustu), Polyclinics and BKIA / Maternity Hospital during the year 2006 this number is relatively unchanged. In addition to the provision of health facilities to improve health services to the community, the health care supply business is also expected to be improved. Noted there are as many as two (2) pieces Hospital, 13 health centers, 37 sub health centers, two (2) Medical Center, 2 (two) BKIA / maternity hospital and 1 (one) Clinic. The medical personnel are available consisting of 18 physicians, 10 dentists, 97 nurses, 84 midwives, and 82 other health workers.

== Potential Areas ==
=== Food Crops & Horticulture ===
Potential natural state supported by people who are mostly farmers allow various types of plants can be developed, both for small and large scale.

Development of Agriculture and horticulture crops provide an advantage for Sidenreng Rappang, whose economy is based on agriculture sector, with a wide, potential and even geography was conducive to the development of this sector. In the development of this sector fully supports the government programs intended to help farmers and improving the standard of living.

Featured commodities Sidenreng Rappang Agriculture and Horticulture Food Crops include: Rice, Corn, Cassava, Sweet Potato, Peanuts, Soybeans, Green Bean, Cucumber, Eggplant, Large Chilli, chili, tomatoes, beans length, kale, Spinach, Banana, Guava, Mango, Citrus Siam, Papaya, Salak, Jackfruit, Breadfruit.

=== Potential Plantation ===
Plantation sector development directed at increasing production and productivity, improved quality of results and the development of agribusiness plantation commodities. The development of the plantation sector provide an advantage for Sidenreng Rappang because of geography that supports fully with programs intended to help farmers and improving the standard of living.

The plantation species developed in Sidenreng Rappang include: Coconut, Cocoa, Cashew, Pepper, Coffee, Tamarind, Clove.

=== Forestry ===
The forestry sector is in Sidenreng Rappang namely: Protected forest, limited production forest, forest degraded land and forest preserves. More details Sindereng district forestry Rappang picture can be seen in the following table;

1. Limited Production Forest
2. forest Preserve
3. Forest Reserves.

=== Livestock ===
Livestock sector is the dominant sector in Sidenreng Rappang. This can be seen by the many farms, both large and small livestock farm. The pattern is just relying on the ranch for pasture land that is in a broad Kabypaten Sidenreng Rappang with 19 154 hectares, spread over nine (9) districts.

Especially small livestock (poultry), the sector is very potential to be developed viewed from various aspects, such as land aspects, socio-economic feasibility, infrastructure, etc..

Poultry population and Not Race Race (Native) is the largest population. For this type of laying chicken, in 2005 totaled 2,360,142 head, an increase of 2,503,721 head in 2006. As for the chicken Buras, also increased the number of tails 1,661,669 in 2005, and in 2006 amounted to 1,761,401 head.

== Tourism ==
Geographically located belt Sidenreng Rappang trajectory major tourist destination areas in South Sulawesi, namely Tanah Toraja (Tator), so it is a large district and includes many locations for people to visit.

Tourist destinations in Sidenreng Rappang that can be used as a primary goal among others are: DataE Travel Park, Studio Art Nene 'Mallomo, Lake Sidenreng, Thermal Baths, Nature Park, Niagara, Horse Racing, and Toda Bojo Agro Tourism.

== Communication ==
Telecommunications infrastructure development directed at increasing the flow of information on a region to another, which is expected to spur economic activity between regions.

One of telecommunications facilities in the district are Sidenreng Rappang Postal Service. The number of existing service facilities Heading 4 (four) pieces Pangkajene the Post Office, Post Office Rappang, Amparita Post Office and Post Office Tanru Tedong.

In addition to the Post Office, that there are other means of telecommunication in Sidenreng Rappang is Phone. This communication services implemented by PT Telkom to facilitate communication between people who use cable telephone services, in addition to the user 's cell phone or mobile phone services, with the installation of antennas ( BTS ) from PT Telkomsel and PT Satelindo for certain areas such as the District and surrounding MaritangngaE, District Panca Flint, District Five Lautang, and District Two PituE, hence the need for telecommunications, particularly mobile phones can be served in Sidenreng Rappang, although for the time being is still limited existence.

== Transportation ==
Rappang Sidenreng within ± 200 km from Makassar and lies at the intersection between the lines to Palopo and Toraja. To get to this area is by bus or Toraja Palopo majors, general passenger cars (Toyota, Suzuki APV, Izusu Panther) and minibuses.
