= Alauddin Islamic State University =

Indonesian state university

Coordinates: 5.1767°S 119.4341°E

Universitas Islam Negeri Alauddin
- Alauddin State Islamic University
- Former name: Institut Agama Islam Negeri Alauddin
- Type: State University
- Affiliations: Islam
- Rector: H. Hamdan Juhannis
- Location: Makassar and Samata, Sombaopu, Gowa (Main Campus), South Sulawesi, Indonesia
- Colors: Green
- Website: http://www.uin-alauddin.ac.id/home

Universitas Islam Negeri Alauddin (Alauddin State Islamic University) is a university located in Makasar, South Sulawesi. The name Alauddin originates from the name of the first king of the Gowa Sultanate who converted to Islam, changed his name to Alauddin and made Islam as the sultanate's official religion.

== History ==
The historical development of UIN Alauddin State Islamic University of Makassar, formerly called Institut Agama Islam Negeri Alaudin (Islamic Institute Alauddin) went through several phases.

=== 1962–1965 ===
Initially IAIN Alauddin Makassar was a branch faculty of IAIN Sunan Kalijaga in Yogyakarta. With the insistence of the People and Government of South Sulawesi and the consent of the Rector of IAIN Sunan Kalijaga Yogyakarta, Minister of Religion of the Republic of Indonesia issued Decision No. 75 on October 17, 1962, to nationalize the Faculty. On November 10, 1962, the Faculty of Shari'ah was nationalized, followed by the nationalization of Faculty of Tarbiyah on November 11, 1964, with the decision number 91 of the Minister of Religions on November 7, 1964, and then Faculty Ushuluddin on October 28, 1965, by the Decree of the Minister of Religion number 77 on October 28, 1965.

=== 1965–2005 ===
By considering the support and the great desire of the people and the Government of South Sulawesi to education and university-level instruction in Islam, as well as the legal basis of Presidential Regulation No. 27 of 1963, which among other things stated that at least three types of faculties could be combined into a single institute, then starting on November 10, 1965, the three faculties changed the status to become State Islamic Institute or Institut Agama Islam Negeri with Decree of the Minister of Religious Affairs No. 79 dated October 28, 1965.

Alaudin was chosen for the name of the newly created institute. The idea of giving the name "Alauddin" to IAIN of Makassar at first expressed by the founders of IAIN "Alauddin", among them the Prince Daeng Andi Rani, descendant of Sultan Alauddin, who was also a former Governor of South Sulawesi, and Ahmad Makkarausu Amansyah Ilau Daeng, a historian on Makassar.

In that phase, IAIN (now UIN) Alauddin which originally only had three of faculties, developed into five faculties marked by the establishment of the Faculty of Adab accordance with the decree of the Ministry of Religious Affairs No. 148 1967 on November 23, 1967, followed by the Faculty of Da'wa by the Minister of Religious Affairs Decree 253 of 1971 which is based in the Faculty of Bulukumba (153 km south of the city of Makassar), which further by Presidential Decree 9 of 1987, the Faculty of Da'wa diverted to Makassar, then followed by the establishment of the Graduate Program (PPS) with the Decree of Directorate General of Islamic Institutions No. 31 / E / 1990 dated June 7, 1990, the status of a remote class of PPs IAIN Syarif Hidayatullah Jakarta and then to the Minister of Religious Affairs No. 1993 403 PPs IAIN Alauddin Makassar became independent PPs.

=== Since 2005 ===
To respond to the demand for development of knowledge and fundamental change on National Education System by the birth of the Law on #2 in 1989 where levels of education under the Ministry of National Education and Department of Religious Affairs became commensurate, especially in secondary education level, as well as to accommodate graduates from secondary schools under the auspices of the Ministry of National Education and Department of Religious Affairs, there was necessary to change the status of the institute to a university. At the initiative of IAIN Alauddin leadership 2002-2006 period and the support from Academic community of IAIN Alauddin, Senate and the Governor of South Sulawesi, a conversion plan was proposed to the President through the Minister of Religion Affairs and the Minister of National Education. On October 10, 2005, the status of Islamic StateInstitute (IAIN) Alauddin Makassar transformed to State Islamic University of Alauddin. The transformation was based on Presidential Regulation (Decree) of the Republic of Indonesia No. 57 of 2005 decreed on October 10, 2005. The inauguration was formalized by signing of the inscription by then president, Susilo Bambang Yudhoyono on December 4, 2005, in Makassar.

With the change of the status from an institute to a university, UIN Alauddin Makassar experiences the development of five faculties to become seven faculties and one Graduate Program (PPS) based on the regulation No. 5 16 March 2006 issued by the Ministry of Religious Affairs, namely:

- Faculty of Shari'ah and Laws
- Faculty Tarbiyah and Education
- Faculty Ushuluddin and Philosophy
- Faculty of Adab and Humanities
- Faculty of Da'wah and Communications
- Faculty of Science and Technology
- Faculty of Health Sciences.
- Faculty of Economics and Business Islamic
- Graduate Program (PPS)
