= List of members of the Presidential Advisory Council =

The following is a list of members of the Presidential Advisory Council since 2007. Initially, the Presidential Advisory Council (Wantimpres) consisted of nine members, one of whom served as chairperson; however, Law No. 64 of 2026 removed the limit on the number of members.

== 2007–2009 ==
The Presidential Advisory Council for the first term was appointed by President Susilo Bambang Yudhoyono through Presidential Decree Number 28/M of 2007 on March 26, 2007, and was inaugurated on April 10, 2007, with Ali Alatas as Chairman. Because he passed away while in office, T.B. Silalahi replaced Ali Alatas as Chairman of the Presidential Advisory Council. Here's the list of the Council members:

Members of the Presidential Advisory Council 2007–2009
Ali Alatas (Chairman 2007–2008)
International Relations
Emil Salim	Rachmawati Soekarnoputri	Sjahrir (2007–2008)	Ma'ruf Amin
Environment and Sustainable Development	Politics	Economy	Religious Life
T. B. Silalahi (Chairman 2008–2009)	Subur Budhisantoso	Radi A. Gany	Adnan Buyung Nasution
Defense and Security	Social and Cultural	Agriculture	Law

== 2015–2019 ==
The 2015–2019 formation of the advisory council was decreed by the Presidential Decree No. 6/P Tahun 2015 dan Keppres 8/P Tahun 2015. The chairperson was Sri Adiningsih. The members of the advisory council were Sidarto Danusubroto, Yusuf Kartanegara, Hasyim Muzadi (2015–2017), Agum Gumelar (2018–2019), Suharso Monoarfa, Rusdi Kirana (2015–2017), Jan Darmadi, Abdul Malik Fadjar, Subagyo Hadi Siswoyo, and Yahya Cholil Staquf (2018–2019).

Members of the Presidential Advisory Council 2015–2019
Sri Adiningsih (Chairwoman)
Sidarto Danusubroto	Yusuf Kartanegara	Hasyim Muzadi (2015–2017)	Suharso Monoarfa
Rusdi Kirana (2015–2017)	Jan Darmadi	Abdul Malik Fadjar	Subagyo Hadi Siswoyo
Reshuffle
Agum Gumelar (2018–2019)		Yahya Cholil Staquf (2018–2019)	

== 2019–2024 ==
The latest formation of the advisory council was decreed by the Presidential Decree No.137/P/2019. On 13 December 2019, President Joko Widodo inaugurates 9 individuals to fill the council for 2019–2024 term, with Wiranto designated as the chairman.

Anggota Dewan Pertimbangan Presiden 2019–2024
Wiranto (Chairman)
Sidarto Danusubroto	Agung Laksono	Tahir	Putri Kus Wisnu Wardani
Muhammad Luthfi bin Yahya	Muhamad Mardiono (2019–2022)	Arifin Panigoro (2019–2022)	Soekarwo
Reshuffle
Djan Faridz (2023–2024)		Gandi Sulistiyanto (2023–2024)	

== 2026–2029 ==
Following the inauguration of Prabowo Subianto as president in October 2024, no Presidential Advisory Council (Wantimpres) was initially appointed. Instead, Prabowo appointed Special Advisors to the President to provide advice on specific issues. The Presidential Advisory Council was re-established on 2 October 2026, when Prabowo inaugurated 26 members at the State Palace in Jakarta. The appointments were made pursuant to Presidential Decree No. 107/P of 2026. Pratikno was appointed chairperson, Hatta Rajasa vice chairperson, and Muhammad Qodari secretary, with 23 other members appointed to the council.

Members of the Presidential Advisory Council 2026
Pratikno; Ketua				Hatta Rajasa; Wakil Ketua			
M. Qodari; Sekretaris	Sinta Nuriyah	Quraish Shihab	Agum Gumelar	Chairul Tanjung	Said Aqil Siradj	Anwar Iskandar	Yahya Cholil Staquf
Jusuf Wanandi	Budi Gunawan	Bambang Soesatyo	Salim S. Al-Jufri	Soekarwo	Tahir	Rocky Gerung	Ida Bagus Purwalaksana
Philip Kuncoro Wijaya	Budi Tanuwibowo	Anwar Usman	Mohamad Hatta	Jusuf Hamka	Margarito Kamis	Jacky Manuputty	Ignasius Jonan
