= International Indonesia Forum =

- Genre: Conference
- Frequency: Annually
- Location: Indonesia
- Years active: 2008–present
- Inaugurated: 2008
- Most recent: 2023
- Next event: 2024
- Area: Global
- Website: iif.or.id

The International Indonesia Forum (IIF) is an organisation which holds annual interdisciplinary seminars in Indonesia in an attempt to "facilitate interactive engagement and participation of students and educators" both inside and outside of Indonesia. Originally developed as an offshoot of the Yale Indonesia Forum, it is now maintained independently. The seminar was first held in 2008 at Atma Jaya University, Yogyakarta; the eighth conference was held at Sebelas Maret University in Surakarta. The forum has published five books and hosts a working paper series on its website.

== Overview ==
The International Indonesia Forum is run on a voluntary basis. It does not charge fees for presenters. Audience members may be from academia or the general public, including non-academic organisations. As of August 2014, five books have been published based on papers presented at the conferences. The chairman of the IIF is Frank Dhont. The forum hosts a working paper series on its website.

== History ==
In 2003, Yale University in New Haven, Connecticut, established an interdisciplinary discussion forum for academics with a professional interest in Indonesia and related topics. This forum was established by three students, Frank Dhont, YoonSeok Lee, Thomas Pepinsky, with a member of the faculty, Indriyo Sukmono, as adviser. Initially meant for "members of the Yale community", this forum grew in size, until in 2006 it was capable of holding conferences. Discussions began in 2007 about having another conference, this time in Indonesia so as to facilitate the attendance of Indonesianists from outside the United States, particularly those in Indonesia. This second conference was hoped to "facilitate interactive engagement and participation of students and educators" from both Indonesia and abroad.

The first such conference was held at Atma Jaya University, Yogyakarta, in mid-2008: Atma Jaya handled financial issues related to hosting, whereas Yale handled the cost of publication. The conference, with the theme "Towards An Inclusive Democratic Indonesian Society: Bridging the Gap Between State Uniformity and Multicultural Identity Patterns", a theme which reviewer Alexander Claver described as "timely" owing to the issues of managing diversity and "societal heterogeneity and homogeneity". Claver wrote that the resulting book, though it did "not paint a coherent picture" and was uneven, was still "a rich source of ideas" and that most readers would find something of interest within.

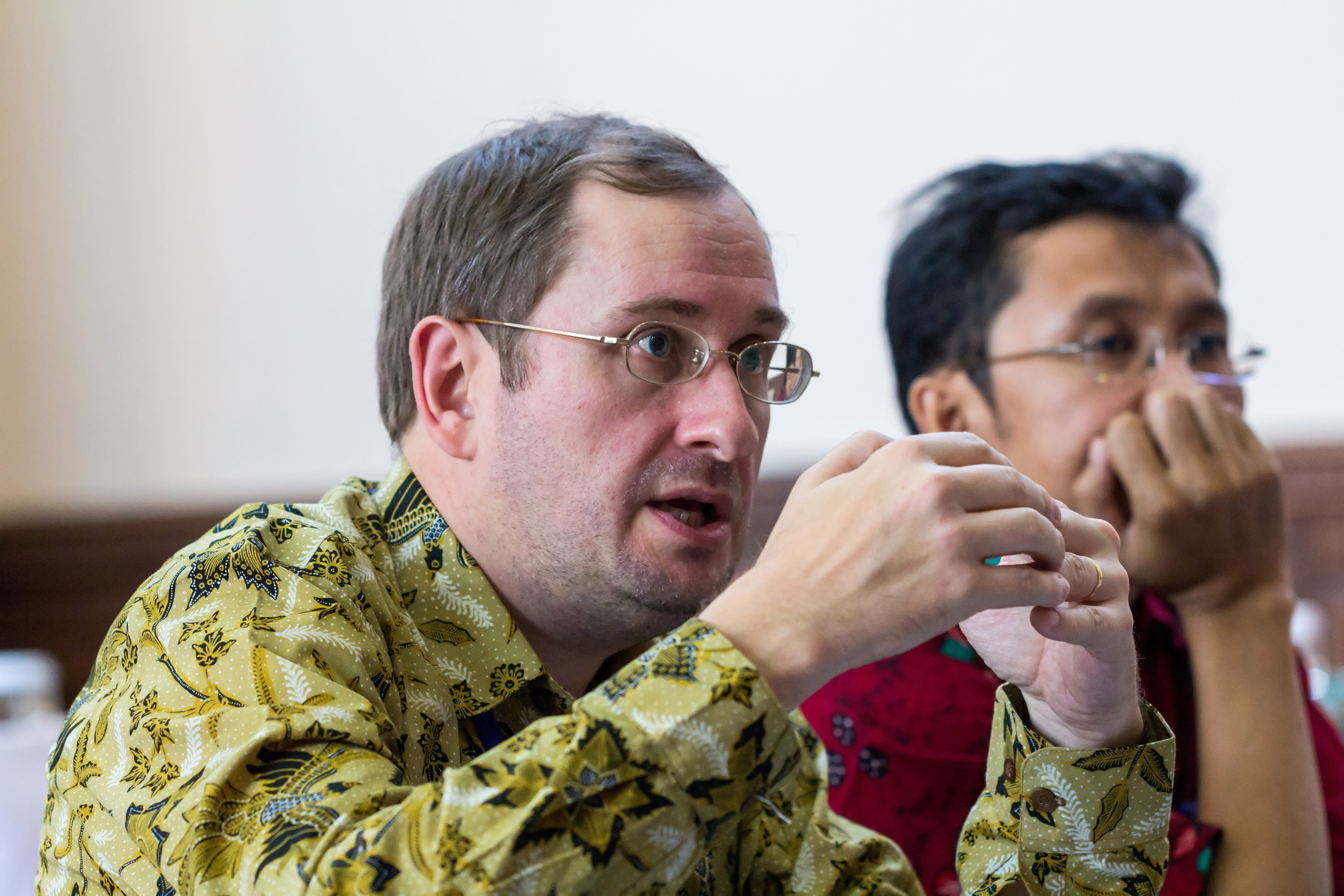
Frank Dhont, chairman of the IIF, at the 2014 conference

The second forum, hosted at Sanata Dharma University (also in Yogyakarta), dealt with Pancasila, Indonesia's national ideology, and its role in the Reformation era. Claver writes that this was a development on the themes explored in the first conference. By this point half of attendees were Indonesian academics, with the remainder from various international institutions. An academic review of the conference's proceedings (published the following year) was highly negative: reviewer R. E. Elson wrote that the book was "disappointing", with "far too much airy and meaningless blather about identity and too much vacuous wordy and unproductive theorising" regarding its subject matter.

Various universities hosted the program in succeeding years, mostly in Yogyakarta but also in nearby Semarang. The number of participants increased yearly, and in 2011 the international conferences (increasingly separate from their parent organisation) were branched off under the title International Indonesia Forum. That year's conference, taking the theme of education for the future, was held at Yogyakarta State University and drew a crowd of 150 audience members and presenters.

In 2012 the conference, which received 171 submissions and saw nearly 100 speakers, was held at Gadjah Mada University in Yogyakarta; speakers originated from a number of international and Indonesian universities, including Harvard, Cornell, Berkeley, Sydney, Leiden, and the London School of Economics. The rector of Gadjah Mada University, Pratikno, stated that the conference was relevant to both Indonesia and the university as education was necessary to combat corruption. This was the last IIF conference with Yale support; a new, independent, organisational body was established so that the conference could continue independently.

The sixth conference was held at Sunan Kalijaga Islamic University, Yogyakarta, in 2013; over fifty individuals presented presenters. Of the conferences theme regarding change and continuity in the country, director of Sunan Kalijaga's post-graduate program Khoiruddin Nasution stated that changes were rapidly developing in the country and, as such, it was hoped that the IIF could provide recommendations to the Indonesian government regarding the correct path to take.

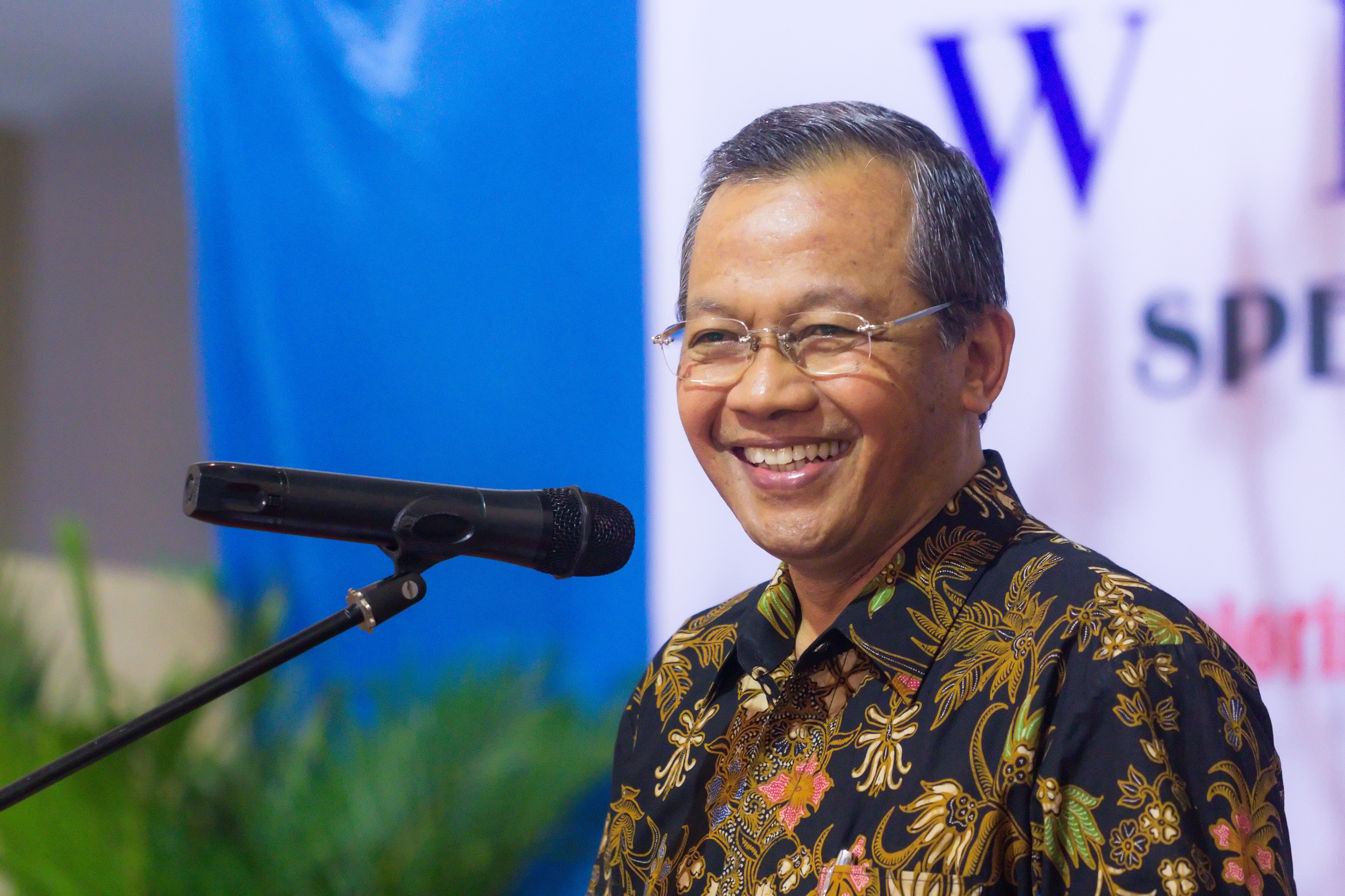
Ravik Kardisi, rector of Sebelas Maret University, addressing the 8th conference

A seventh conference was held in 2014 at the Puri Khatulistiwa Hotel in Jatinangor, outside Bandung, in collaboration with the Sunan Gunung Djati State Islamic University Bandung. The two-day conference consisted of six sessions, with three panels in each session, and each panel consisting of four speakers. The sixty-four speakers came from such institutions as the University of Freiburg, Australian National University, and Charles Darwin University, and originated from countries such as Malaysia, Australia, and the United States. Topics discussed involved various aspects of Indonesian society, including law, history, culture, and economics. Ali Ramadhani, third vice president of Gunung Djati, stated that Indonesianists, such as those at the IIF, needed to stay confident in researching contemporary issues.

The eight IIF conference was hosted by Sebelas Maret University in the city of Surakarta between 29 and 30 July 2015. Seventy speakers, representing such universities as North Carolina, Berkeley, and London, attended the conference. Panel themes included Art and Tradition in Indonesia, Wayang: Traditional Puppetry in Modern Times, and Tradition and Economy. The following year, the ninth IIF conference was held at Atma Jaya Catholic University of Indonesia in Jakarta. More than fifty speakers presented papers with the theme "In Search of Key Drivers of Indonesian Empowerment". The keynote speaker, Sri Adiningsih of the Presidential Advisory Council, used the conference to call on Indonesianists and other academics to support the Indonesian government's efforts to promote empowerment.

== Conferences ==
Date	Location	Theme	Ref
18–19 July 2008	Atma Jaya University, Yogyakarta	Towards An Inclusive Democratic Indonesian Society: Bridging the Gap Between State Uniformity and Multicultural Identity Patterns	
1–2 July 2009	Sanata Dharma University, Yogyakarta	Pancasila's Contemporary Appeal: Re-legitimizing Indonesia's Founding Ethos	
14–15 July 2010	Diponegoro University, Semarang	Social Justice and Rule of Law: Addressing the Growth of a Pluralist Indonesian Democracy	
27–28 June 2011	Yogyakarta State University	Enriching Future Generations: Education Promoting Indonesian Self-Development	
9–10 July 2012	Gadjah Mada University, Yogyakarta	Between the Mountain and the Sea: Positioning Indonesia	
21–22 August 2013	Sunan Kalijaga Islamic University, Yogyakarta	Transformation towards the Future: Continuity versus Change in Indonesia	
19–20 August 2014	UIN Sunan Gunung Djati, Bandung	Representing Indonesia	
29–30 July 2015	Sebelas Maret University, Surakarta	Discourses Exploring the Space between Tradition and Modernity in Indonesia	
23–24 August 2016	Atma Jaya Catholic University of Indonesia, Jakarta	In Search of Key Drivers of Indonesian Empowerment	
25–26 July 2017	Muhammadiyah University of Yogyakarta, Yogyakarta	Indonesian Exceptionalism: Values and Morals of the Middle Ground	
16 July 2018	Satya Wacana Christian University, Salatiga	Stakeholders in Indonesian Growth: Sharing the Natural and Social Environment in Indonesia	
26–27 June 2019	National Cheng Kung University, Tainan	Rising to the Occasion: Indonesian Creativity, Ingenuity, and Innovation in a World in Transition	
24–26 August 2020	National Cheng Kung University, Tainan (physical location) and Catholic University of Saint Thomas, Medan (online host)	The Center and Periphery: Development and Sustainable Management of Indonesian Resources	
22–24 October 2021	Wenzao Ursuline University of Languages, Kaohsiung (physical location) and Catholic University of Saint Thomas, Medan (online host)	Resolve and Perseverance	
23–25 September 2022	Yale University, New Haven (online host)	Indonesia's Complexity: Investigating the Layers between the Apparent and the Underlying	
11–12 July 2023	Sultan Syarif Kasim II State Islamic University, Pekanbaru	The Power of Words: Communication and Message in Indonesia	

== Publications ==
- Frank Dhont; Kevin W. Fogg; Mason C. Hoadley, eds. (2009). Towards an Inclusive Democratic Indonesian Society. International conference book series. Vol. 1. Yogyakarta: Atma Jaya University Press. ISBN 978-979-1317-93-1.
- Frank Dhont; Thomas J. Conners; Mason C. Hoadley; Kevin Ko, eds. (2010). Pancasila's Contemporary Appeal. International conference book series. Vol. 2. Yogyakarta: Sanata Dharma University Press. ISBN 978-979-1088-56-5.
- Thomas J. Conners; Frank Dhont; Mason C. Hoadley; Adam D. Tyson, eds. (2011). Social Justice and the Rule of Law. International conference book series. Vol. 3. Semarang: Diponegoro University Press. ISBN 978-979-18375-8-3.
- Rommel A. Curaming; Frank Dhont, eds. (2012). Education in Indonesia. International conference book series. Vol. 4. Yogyakarta: Yogyakarta State University Press. ISBN 978-979-15709-5-4.
- Frank Dhont; Tracy Wright Webster; Rommel A. Curaming, eds. (2013). Between the Mountain and the Sea: Positioning Indonesia. International conference book series. Vol. 5. Yogyakarta: Gadjah Mada University Press. ISBN 978-979-420-824-3.

== Works cited ==
- "Akademikus Harus Menawarkan Solusi" [Academics Must Offer a Solution]. Sinar Harapan (in Indonesian). 30 July 2015. Archived from the original on 31 July 2015.
- Andayani, Theresia (9 July 2012). "Pemerintah Segera Luncurkan Warisan Budaya Nasional" [Government to Immediately Launch National Cultural Heritage Programme]. Tribun Jogja (in Indonesian).
- Claver, Alexander (2010). "Review: Towards an inclusive democratic Indonesian society; Bridging the gap between state uniformity and multicultural identity patterns. [Yale Indonesia Forum International Conference Book Series 1.] by Frank Dhont; Kevin W. Fogg; Mason C. Hoadley". Bijdragen tot de Taal-, Land- en Volkenkunde. 166 (1). KITLV: 116–18. JSTOR 27868557.
- Dhont, Frank (Fall 2009). "Report on "The Second Yale Indonesia Forum International Conference"" (PDF). Conference/Symposia Reports. Association for Asian Studies: 6. Archived from the original (PDF) on 21 October 2013.
- "Dinamika Politik Indonesia Menarik" [Indonesian Political Dynamics Interesting]. Pikiran Rakyat (in Indonesian). 20 August 2014. p. 2.
- Elson, R. E. (2012). "Review: Pancasila's contemporary appeal: Relegitimizing Indonesia's founding ethos. [International Conference Book Series 2] by Thomas J. Conners; Mason C. Hoadley; Frank Dhont; Kevin Ko". Bijdragen tot de Taal-, Land- en Volkenkunde. 168 (1). KITLV: 131–32. JSTOR 41494546.
- Fathoni, Mukh (27 June 2012). "UGM dan Yale University Akan Gelar Konferensi Internasional" [UGM and Yale University to Hold International Conference]. Tribun Jogja (in Indonesian).
- "History of the Forum". iif.or.id. International Indonesia Forum. Archived from the original on 2 September 2013.
- "Home Page (2013)". iif.or.id. International Indonesia Forum. Archived from the original on 8 September 2015.
- "Home Page (2014)". iif.or.id. International Indonesia Forum. Archived from the original on 8 September 2015.
- "Home Page (2015)". iif.or.id. International Indonesia Forum. Archived from the original on 8 September 2015.
- Kurniati, Pythag (29 July 2015). "Puluhan Ilmuwan dari Berbagai Negara Hadiri International Indonesia Forum" [Tens of Academics from Various Countries Attend the International Indonesia Forum] (in Indonesian). MetroTV. Archived from the original on 31 July 2015.
- "Indonesia International Conference" (PDF). Newsletter. MacMillan Center: 5. Fall 2008.
- O'Shannassy, Michael (18 July 2009). "Reimagining the state ideology Pancasila?". The Jakarta Post. Archived from the original on 19 October 2013.
- Purwata, Heri (21 August 2013). "UIN Sunan Kalijaga Gelar Konferensi Internasional" [Sunan Kalijaga Islamic University Holds International Conference]. Republika (in Indonesian). Archived from the original on 7 September 2013.
- Ruslan, Heri (18 August 2014). "Indonesia "Seksi" untuk Diteliti" [Indonesia 'Sexy' to be Studied]. Republika (in Indonesian). Archived from the original on 26 August 2014.
- Ruslan, Heri (19 August 2014). "Rayakan HUT ke-69 RI, Peneliti tentang Indonesia Menggelar Konferensi" [Celebrating Indonesia's 69th Independence Day, Indonesianists Hold a Conference]. Republika (in Indonesian). Archived from the original on 26 August 2014.
- "Unika Atma Jaya – IIF Gelar Konferensi Pemberdayaan Manusia Indonesia" [Atma Jaya – IIF Hold Seminar on Human Empowerment in Indonesia]. UCAN (in Indonesian). 24 August 2016. Archived from the original on 20 September 2016.
- Unjianto, Bambang (11 July 2011). "Pendidikan Harus Relevan dengan Kebutuhan Masyarakat" [Education Must be Relevant to Society's Needs]. Suara Merdeka (in Indonesian). Archived from the original on 17 October 2013.
- "Working Paper Series". iif.or.id. International Indonesia Forum. Archived from the original on 21 September 2015.
- "Yale Indonesia Forum 2003–2004". yale.edu. Yale University. Archived from the original on 25 September 2013.
- "Yale Indonesia Forum: International conference 2008". yale.edu. Yale University. Archived from the original on 1 February 2013.
- "Yale Indonesia Forum: International conference 2009". yale.edu. Yale University. Archived from the original on 1 February 2013.
- "Yale Indonesia Forum: International conference 2010". yale.edu. Yale University. Archived from the original on 20 September 2013.
- "Yale Indonesia Forum: International conference 2011". yale.edu. Yale University. Archived from the original on 17 October 2013.
- "Yale Indonesia Forum: International conference 2012". yale.edu. Yale University. Archived from the original on 17 October 2013.
- "10th International Indonesia Forum, July 25-26, 2017". iif.or.id. International Indonesia Forum. Archived from the original on 22 July 2013.
- "11th International Indonesia Forum, July 16, 2018". iif.or.id. International Indonesia Forum. Archived from the original on 22 July 2013.
- "12th International Indonesia Forum, June 26-27, 2019". iif.or.id. International Indonesia Forum. Archived from the original on 22 July 2013.
- "13th International Indonesia Forum, August 24-26, 2020". iif.or.id. International Indonesia Forum. Archived from the original on 22 July 2013.
- "Announcement: Stanford Southeast Asia Program Webinar and 14th International Indonesia Forum Keynote Speech: Prof. Dr. Don Emmerson, 22 October 2021". networks.h-net.org. H-Net network on the history and study of Southeast Asia. Archived from the original on 21 July 2023.
- "Indonesia's Complexity: Investigating the Layers between the Apparent and the Underlying". cseas.yale.edu/. Council on Southeast Asia Studies at Yale University. Archived from the original on 21 July 2023.
- "International Indonesia Forum ke 16 : The Power of Words". www.uin-suska.ac.id. Universitas Islam Negeri Sultan Syarif Kasim Riau. Archived from the original on 20 July 2023.
