= Endang (name) =

Endang is a common given first name for women in Indonesia and occasionally for men. Notable people with the first name Endang include:

- Endang Nursugianti, (born 1983) Indonesian badminton player
- Endang Rahayu Sedyaningsih, (1955–2012) Indonesian health minister from October 22, 2009, until April 30, 2012
- Endang Turmudi, (born 1955) Indonesian sociologist and Research Professor
- Endang Witarsa, (1916–2008) Indonesian soccer player and coach
- Hetty Koes Endang (born 1957), an Indonesian kroncong singer

== See also ==
- Indang (dance)
