= Anwar Musaddad =

Indonesian educator and muslim scholar (1910–2000)

Kyai Haji Anwar Musaddad
- ْأَنْوَرْ مُسَدَّد
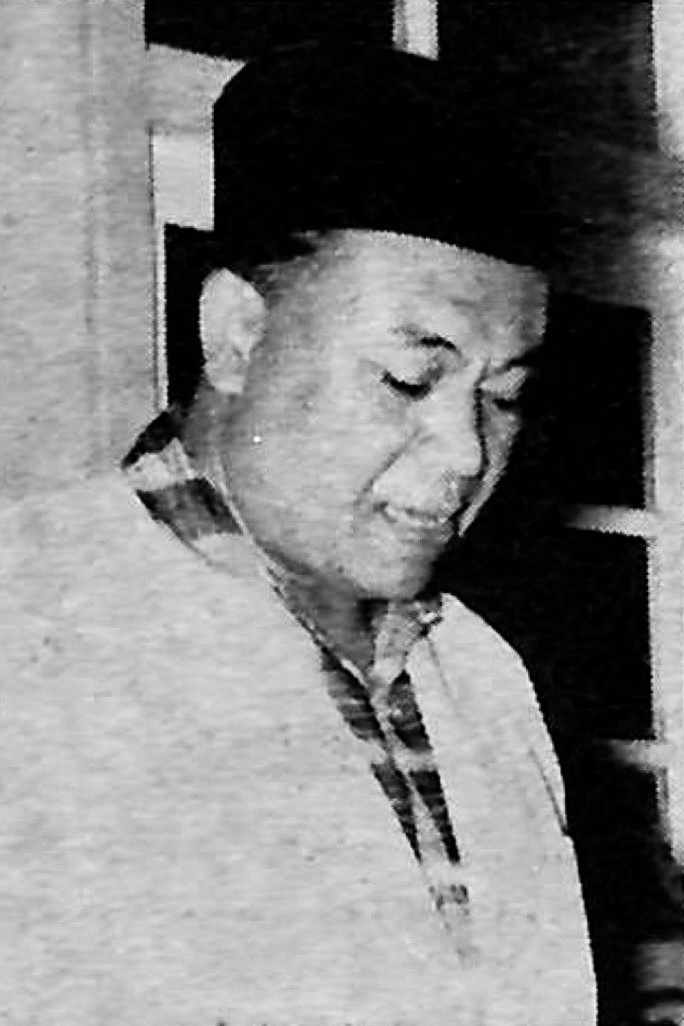
- Musaddad in 1960
- Born: Dede Musaddad; 3 April 1910; Ciledug, West Java, Dutch East Indies (present day Indonesia)
- Died: 21 July 2000 (aged 90); Garut, West Java, Indonesia
- Resting place: Pondok Pesantren Al-Musaddadiyah Garut, West Java, Indonesia
- Education: Hollandsch-Inlandsche School; Meer Uitgebreid Lager Onderwijs; Algemene Middelbare School
- Occupations: Profesor; muslim scholar
- Political party: Nahdlatul Ulama

Anwar Musaddad (born Dede Musaddad; 3 April 1910 – 21 July 2000) was an Indonesian professor and Muslim scholar of Sundanese descent, a professor of Christology and comparative religious studies, and one of the five charismatic West Javan academics who is hafidz al-Qur'an.

== Early life and education ==
Dede Musaddad was a descendant of aristocratic ancestry from two notable West Javan kings, and he was born in the village of Ciledug in Garut Regency on 3 April 1910. His mother, Marfuah binti Kasriyo, was a descendant of Prince Diponegoro, who was associated with the Mataram Sultanate, while his father, Abdul Awwal bin Haji Abdul Kadir, traced his descent to Sunan Gunungjati, connecting him to the Pajajaran and Cirebon sultanates. After the death of his father when he was four years old, he was raised by his mother and grandmother, who managed the Batik and dodol arrowroot business under the Kuraetin brand.

Early schooling was given to him at the Hollandsch-Inlandsche School in Garut, where he graduated in 1921. After completing his schooling at Meer Uitgebreid Lager Onderwijs in Sukabumi, he went on to Algamene Middlebare School (AMS) in Batavia, for his high school education. Upon completing AMS, he spoke German, Dutch, and English well. In the interim, self-taught Arabic language learners can acquire the language that would be used in Arabia. His education at a missionary foundation school, where he studied the Bible and Christology, shaped him.

Concerned about his faith, his mother encouraged him to deepen his understanding of Islam under the guidance of renowned West Javan scholar Muhammad Sachroni. This dual knowledge of Islam and Christianity laid a strong foundation for him to become a modern, open-minded religious scholar. After completing high school, Musaddad studied at Darussalam Wanaraja Islamic Boarding School in Garut for two years before continuing his education in Mecca in 1930. He spent 11 years at Madrasah Al-Falah, learning from prominent Meccan scholars of the time. Sheikh Janan Toyyib, Sayyid Alwi al Maliki, Sheikh Umar Hamdan, Sayyid Amin Qubti, and Sheikh Abdul Muqoddasi were among his professors.

Musaddad participated in the national movement after going home to his country following the end of Dutch colonial control. He was made head of Priangan's Religious Affairs Office during the Japanese occupation. Along with Yusuf Taujiri and Mustafa Kamil Pasha, he commanded the Hizbullah army in fight against Dutch attempts to recolonise Indonesia during the Indonesian National Revolution. In 1948, he was taken into custody by the Dutch and kept in prison until 1950, when Indonesia's sovereignty was acknowledged. Before leaving for Mecca, he had attended the Cipari Islamic Boarding School, which was a hub for religious instruction as well as an important source of patriotism and skills for fending off colonialism.

== Career ==
Minister of Religion Fakih Usman gave Musaddad the job of founding the Islamic College of Religion (PTAIN) in Yogyakarta in 1953. This institution subsequently changed its name to the State Islamic Institute (IAIN), and it is currently known as the Sunan Kalijaga State Islamic University (UIN). Following the 1955 Indonesian legislative election, he represented the Nahdlatul Ulama Party (NU) in the House of Representatives.

From 1960 to 1971, Musaddad continued to serve as a member of DPR-GR. He gave a memorable lecture on "The Role of Religion in Completing the Revolution" during the 5th Dies Natalis of IAIN Al-Jami'ah. He was appointed as a professor of Ushuluddin at IAIN Yogyakarta, where he served from 1962 to 1967. In addition to studying at Darul Falah Makkah school, he teaches math and English. He was a driving force behind the founding of IAIN Sunan Gunung Djati Bandung in 1967 and served as its first rector until 1974.

Musaddad, the Rector of IAIN Sunan Gunung Djati, concentrated on creating complete human resources by starting the IAIN Preparatory Schools (SP IAIN) in Bandung, Majalengka, Garut, Tasikmalaya, and Bogor. In addition to increasing the number of IAIN students, the project sought to realise his goals of "enlightening intellectuals" and "intellectualising scholars." After his return to Garut in 1976, he founded the Al-Musaddadiyah Islamic Boarding School, which provides instruction at all educational levels from elementary to advanced. In 1979, he was designated as the Deputy Rais 'Am PBNU at the NU Congress in muktamar Semarang, under the chairmanship of Bisri Syansuri, marking the pinnacle of his leadership within NU. He also held the Mustasyar post twice, from the muktamar Krapyak and Tasikmalaya. His advanced age stopped him from attending the muktamar at Kediri.

== Later life and death ==
Musaddad had tight ties with high-ranking state officials, especially those in the military, throughout his time as the Imam Rohis (Islamic Spiritual Leader) at the TNI-AD Headquarters and as an active member of the Qadiriyya wa Naqshbandiyya Order in his latter years. At the age of 91, he died on 21 July 2000. He was buried close to the old mosque at the Family Funeral Complex of Pondok Pesantren Al-Musaddadiyah Garut in West Java.
