= Muzadi =

Muzadi is a surname. Notable people with the surname include:

- Hasyim Muzadi (1944–2017), Indonesian politician
- Victor Muzadi (born 1978), Angolan basketball player
