= Endang Turmudi =

Indonesian sociologist

- Turmudi in 2014 during his inauguration as research professor
- Born: October 28, 1955 (age 70)
- Education: Sunan Kalijaga Islamic University; Flinders University (BA); Australian National University (PhD)

Endang Turmudi (born 28 October 1955) is an Indonesian sociologist and research professor. He is a senior researcher at the Indonesian Institute of Sciences (LIPI) in Jakarta and was head for its Society and Culture Research Center (PPKK). Turmudi was inaugurated as LIPI's 114th research professor in December 2014, with research specialization in sociology.

Turmudi obtained his Master of Arts from Flinders University in 1990 and his PhD from the Australian National University in 1996, both in sociology. His dissertation was titled "Struggling for the Umma: Changing Leadership Roles of Kiai in Jombang, East Java". The dissertation was translated into Bahasa Indonesia in 2004 by LKiS Publication and was published as a book titled "Perselingkuhan Kiai dan Kekuasaan".

Besides his main occupation as a researcher, Turmudi is also active in community services. In 2004, Turmudi was the Secretary General of Nahdlatul Ulama, one of the biggest Muslim organizations in the world, and held office until 2009 during the Chairmanship of Hasyim Muzadi.

As a scholar, Turmudi has presented many papers in international seminars and workshops. In Copenhagen in 1997, he presented a paper at the International Workshop on Democratization in Southeast Asia titled "Discourse and Local Politics of Democracy in Indonesia: The World of Pesantren and New Order Politics". Later, in 2001, he became a speaker in the International Conference of IFSSO (International Federation of Social Science Organization) held in Phitsanulok, Thailand. Turmudi also wrote some scientific papers for the Southeast Asian Journal of Social Science becomes a visiting lecturer for some public and private universities in Indonesia.

In 2009, Turmudi was invited as Keynote Speaker for the 2nd National Ulama Summit of the Philippines. In 2010, he was the member of the organizing committee of the International Conference of Islamic Scholars (ICIS).

== Academic Background ==
Turmudi obtained his bachelor's degree from the Sunan Kalijaga Islamic University (IAIN, now UIN) in Yogyakarta, majoring History of Islamic Culture, and graduated in 1981. He continued with his master's degree at Flinders University of South Australia though the AIDAB Scholarship of the Government of Australia and graduated in 1991. From 1992 to 1996, he did his Doctoral degree at the Australian National University in Canberra, also funded by the Government of Australia. His doctoral research was conducted in Jombang, East Java.

== Publications ==
Some of Endang Turmudi's publications:

- Perselingkuhan Kiai dan Kekuasaan, 2004. Yogyakarta: LKiS Publications.
- Islam dan Radikalisme di Indonesia, 2005. Jakarta: LIPI Press.
- Struggling for the Umma: Changing Leadership Roles of Kiai in Jombang, East Java, 2006. Canberra: ANU Press.
- Elections in Indonesia: The New Order and Beyond, 2004. London: RoutledgeCurzon.
- Primordialisme Kesukuan dan Golongan dalam Masyarakat Indonesia Modern, 2004. Jakarta: LIPI Press.
- Korupsi dan Pemerintah Bersih, 2007. Jakarta: LIPI Press.
