= Yahya Cholil Staquf =

Indonesian politician

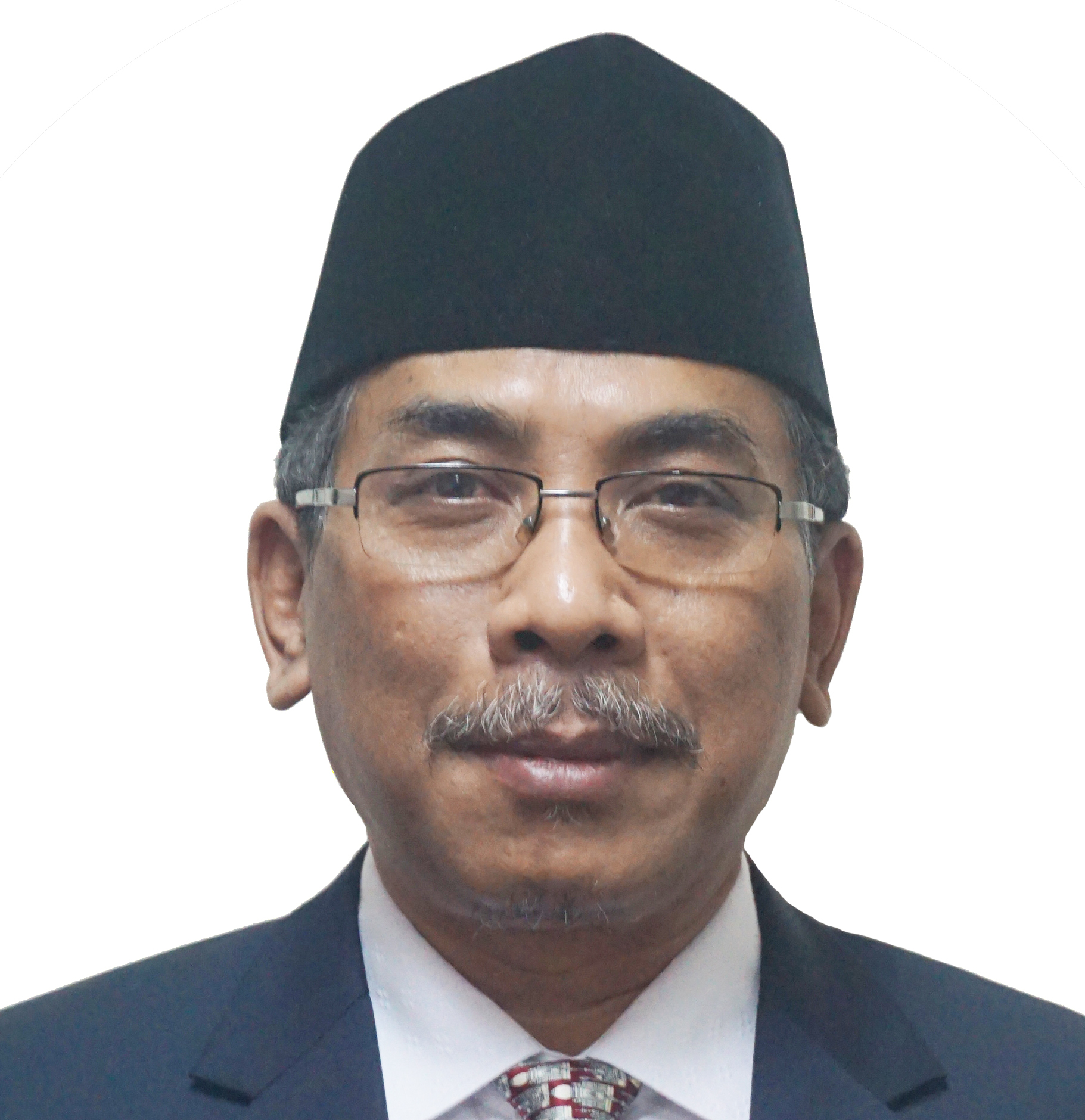
- Staquf in 2018

Chairman of the Executive Council of Nahdlatul Ulama
- In office 24 December 2021 – 31 August 2026
- Preceded by: Said Aqil Siradj
- Succeeded by: Abdul Hakim Mahfudz

Katib Aam of Nahdlatul Ulama
- In office 22 August 2015 – 24 December 2021
- Preceded by: Malik Madani
- Succeeded by: Ahmad Said Asrori

Other roles
- 1999–2001: President spokesperson
- 2018–2019 2026–: Member of Presidential Advisory Council
- 2020–: Member of Indo-Pacific Commission

Personal details
- Born: Yahya Cholil Staquf; 16 February 1966 (age 60) Rembang, Central Java, Indonesia
- Party: National Awakening Party (PKB) (2001–2005); Independent (2005–present)
- Relations: Mustofa Bisri (uncle); Yaqut Cholil Qoumas (brother)
- Education: University of Gadjah Mada (unfinished)
- Occupation: Ulama; Politician
- Known for: Manage the Raudlatut Tholibin Islamic boarding school together with Mustofa Bisri.

Kyai Haji Yahya Cholil Staquf (born 16 February 1966), nicknamed Gus Yahya, is an Indonesian politician and Islamic cleric who has served as the chairman of the Executive Council of Nahdlatul Ulama (NU) since December 2021. In the election of the 34th NU Conference at Lampung University, Bandar Lampung on 24 December 2021, Gus Yahya beat the incumbent Said Aqil Siradj, with the former gaining 337 votes and the latter 210 votes. He served as spokesperson of Abdurrahman Wahid from 1999 to 2001. On 31 May 2018, he was appointed as member of Presidential Advisory Council replacing Hasyim Muzadi by President Joko Widodo. Yahya is a former member of National Awakening Party (PKB).

He was previously predicted to fill the post of minister of religious affairs in Onward Indonesia Cabinet. In the end, President Joko Widodo appointed his younger brother, Yaqut Cholil Qoumas, as Minister of Religious Affairs. In community activities, Yahya formed "Community of Terong Gosong" on 13 May 2009 and served as chairman of supervisors board.

== Personal life ==
Yahya Cholil Staquf was born on 16 February 1966 in Leteh village, Rembang district, Rembang, Central Java. He is the eldest son of former Deputy Speaker of the People's Consultative Assembly Muhammad Cholil Bisri, who was of Javanese people and her mother Muchsinah. He studied in Madrasah Al-Munawwir Krapyak, Yogyakarta. After graduating from high school in Yogyakarta he studied sociology at Gadjah Mada University, but did not complete it. Yahya was active in Muslim Students' Association (HMI) and Nahdlatul Ulama (NU), the largest Islamic organization in Indonesia. From 2015 to 2021 he took the position of Katib Aam (General Secretary of the Supreme Council) in the Nahdlatul Ulama prior to his election as chair.

== Books ==
- The Terong Gosong, (2011)
- Terong Gosong Reloaded, (2016) ISBN 978-602-74657-0-1
- PBNU: Perjuangan Besar Nahdlatul Ulama, 11 March 2020 ISBN 981-204-355-1

== Controversies ==
On 10 June 2018, Yahya visit to Israel as a guest of the American Jewish Committee, a United States advocacy group holding a major conference in Jerusalem. It caused controversy among Indonesian people because Indonesia does not have diplomatic relations with Israel, and support for the Palestinians is very strong. Golkar's Bambang Soesatyo also commented that the visit of Yahya has the potential to cause chaos.

Non-profit organization positions
Preceded by Said Aqil Siradj	Chief Executive of NU; 2021–present	Incumbent
Preceded by Malik Madani	Katib Aam of NU; 2015–2021	Succeeded by Ahmad Said Asrori
