= Suyanto =

Indonesian politician and technocrat

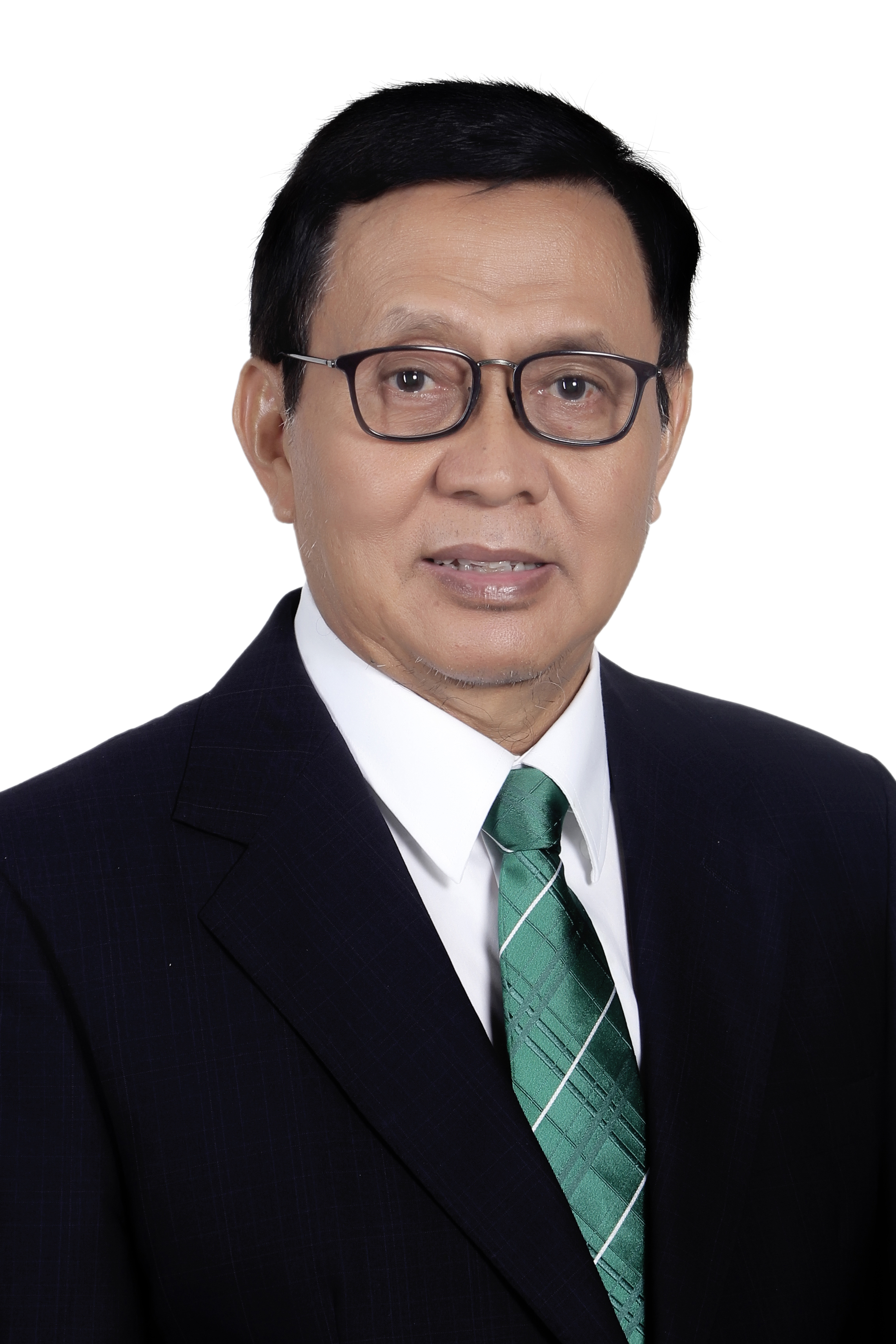
- Suyanto, 2019

Chairman of Alumni Association of Yogyakarta State University
- Incumbent
- Assumed office 2014

Acting Director General for Primary Education in Indonesian Ministry of Education and Culture
- In office 2010–2013
- President: Susilo Bambang Yudhoyono

Vice Chairman of Majelis Pendidikan Tinggi Pimpinan Pusat Muhammadiyah
- In office 2005–2015

Director General for Management of Primary and Secondary Education in Indonesian Ministry of Education and Culture
- In office 2005–2010
- President: Susilo Bambang Yudhoyono

Rector of Yogyakarta State University
- In office 1999–2005
- Preceded by: Djohar
- Succeeded by: Sugeng Mardiyanto

Personal details
- Born: March 2, 1953 (age 73) Magetan, Indonesia
- Education: Michigan State University
- Occupation: Academician

Suyanto (born 2 March 1953) is a professor and technocrat from Indonesia. He had been a rector of Yogyakarta State University and Director General for Management of Primary and Secondary Education in Indonesian Ministry of Education and Culture. He is also known as a writer and speaker in education. His current positions are as a Vice Chairman of Majelis Pendidikan Tinggi Pimpinan Pusat Muhammadiyah and Chairman of Alumni Association of Yogyakarta State University.

== Education ==
Suyanto received a Doctor of Philosophy from Michigan State University in 1986.

== Career ==
- Chairman of Alumni Association of Yogyakarta State University (2014–2018)
- Vice Chairman of Majelis Pendidikan Tinggi Pimpinan Pusat Muhammadiyah (2000–2015)
- Acting Director General for Primary Education in Indonesian Ministry of Education and Culture (2010–2013)
- Director General for Management of Primary and Secondary Education in Indonesian Ministry of Education and Culture (2005–2010)
- Rector of Yogyakarta State University (1999–2006)
- Secretary of Yogyakarta State University Postgraduate Program (1997–1999)
- Consultant of Asia Development Bank (ADB) (1997–1998)
- Consultant of World Bank (1994, 1996)
- Professor in Yogyakarta State University

== Publications ==
=== Books ===
- Buku Panduan Media Pembelajaran Literasi Keuangan Robot Need & Want
- Betapa Mudah Menyusun Tulisan Ilmiah (Esensi, 2016)
- Menjadi Guru Profesional: Strategi Meningkatkan Kualifikasi dan Kualitas Guru di Era Global (Esensi, 2013)
- Bagaimana Menjadi Calon Guru dan Guru Profesional (Multi Pressindo, 2013)
- Wajib Belajar 9 Tahun untuk Masa Depan yang Lebih Baik (Ditjen Dikdas Kemdikbud RI, 2013)
- Hidup Mati RSBI: Boleh Bubar, Virus Kualitasnya Tetap Menyabar (Ditjen Dikdas Kemdikbud RI, 2013)
- Bantuan Siswa Miskin: Strategi Jitu Menyukseskan Wajib Belajar 9 Tahun di Indonesia (Ditjen Dikdas Kemdikbud RI, 2013)
- Betapa Mudah Menulis Karya Ilmiah (Eduka, 2009)
- Dialog Interaktif tentang Pendidikan: dari Konseptual, Menggelitik, sampai yang Ringan dan Ringan Sekali (Multi Pressindo, 2008)
- Dinamika Pendidikan Nasional dalam Percaturan Dunia Global (PSAP Muhammadiyah, 2006)
- Wajah dan Dinamika Pendidikan Anak Bangsa (Adicita Karya Nusa, 2001)
- Refleksi dan Reformasi Pendidikan di Indonesia Memasuki Milenium III (Adicita Karya Nusa, 2000)
- Pokok-Pokok Pembelajaran Pendidikan Ekonomi di SLTP (Departemen Pendidikan Nasional, 2000)
- Belajar: Perkembangan Teori dan Kegiatannya (Yayasan Penerbit FKIS-IKIP Yogyakarta, 1983)

=== Video ===
- Video Pembelajaran Literasi Keuangan Need and Want

=== International publications ===
- Teachers’ Burnout: A SEM Analysis in an Asian Context (Heliyon, Volume 6 Issue 1 January 2020)
- Human Resource Management for Improving Internationalization at a Private University in Yogyakarta, Indonesia (Mediterranean Journal of Social Sciences, Vol. 10 No. 2 March 2019, Indexed by SCOPUS)
- Bringing Voluntary Financial Education in Emerging Economy: Role of Financial Socialization During Elementary Years (The Asia-Pacific Education Researcher, Volume 22/2013 - Volume 26/2017, Indexed by ISI-Thomson)
- Evidence of Private Wage Returns to Schooling in Indonesia from Labor Force Surveys (Actual Problems of economics No. #2 (188), 2017, Indexed by Scopus)
- Indonesia’s School Operational Assistance Program (BOS): Challenges in Embedding Results-Based Approach (Seoul, 22–23 Oktober 2012)
- Enriching Future Generation: Education Promoting Indonesian Self-Development (Yogyakarta; UNY dan Yale University, 27 Juni 2011)
- Technical and Vocational School Development Strategy in Indonesia (Istanbul, 18 – 20 Juni 2009)
- Bridging The Education Gap: Improving Access, Equity, And Quality (The Case Of Indonesia) (Kuala Lumpur, 13–14 Maret 2008)
- Regional Perspective on Current Initiatives and Opportunities for E-9 Teacher Networking: Indonesia – China (Seventh E-9 Ministerial Review Meeting, 10–12 Maret 2008)
- Road Map 2006 – 2010: Policies in the Development of Technical Vocational School in Indonesia (Hanoi, 12 Januari 2008)
- Primary and Secondary School Management: Challenges and Opportunities (Jakarta, 30 Juli 2007)
- Indonesian Education in Comparison Of South East Asian Countries (Yogyakarta, 10 December 2004)
- Strategy of Sport Development within the Frame Work of Local Autonomy: The Case of Indonesia (Yogyakarta, 10 September 2003)
- Dialogue Among the Civilizations: The Role of Universities, Country Perspective: Indonesia (Korea, 20 – 23 November 2002)
- A Glance at the Indonesian Educational System (Yogyakarta, 5-6 Februari 2002)
- Education for Tolerance and Human Rights: Building Socio-Pedagogical Models for Indonesian Harmony in Diversity (Yogyakarta, 16 Juli 2001)
- National Education Reform Agenda: The Principles of Change (Jakarta, 5 Juli 2001)

== National publications ==
1. Dampak Bantuan Operasional Sekolah (BOS) di Madrasah Tsanawiyah

== Award ==
- Joon S. Moon Distinguished International Alumni
