= Sumaryanto =

Rector of State University of Yogyakarta

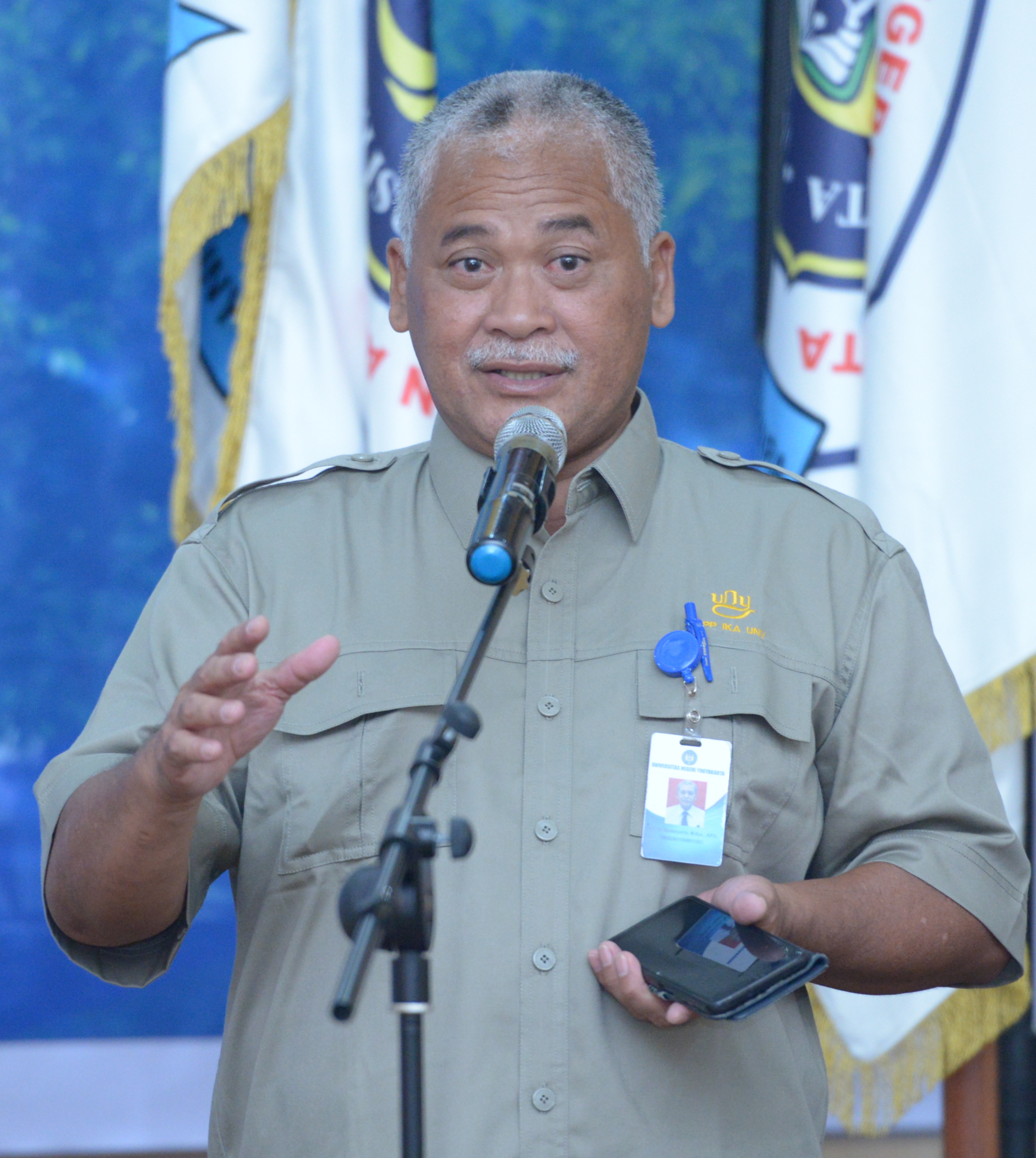
- Sumaryanto, 2022

Rector of Yogyakarta State University
- Incumbent
- Assumed office 2021
- President: Joko Widodo
- Preceded by: Margana

Personal details
- Born: March 1, 1965 (age 61) Sleman, Special Region of Yogyakarta, Indonesia
- Occupation: Academician

Sumaryanto (born 1 March 1965) has been the rector of Yogyakarta State University since 2021. He is also known as a member of the joint independent fact-finding team formed by the President of the Republic of Indonesia, Joko Widodo, to help investigating the Kanjuruhan Stadium disaster.

== Education ==
- Doctor of philosophy (Gadjah Mada University, 2012)

== Publications ==
=== Books ===
- Aksiologi olahraga dalam perspektif pengembangan karakter bangsa (2022)
- Standar kompetensi guru pemula program studi pendidikan jasmani jenjang S1 (2004)
- Olahraga dalam perspektif mewujudkan kehidupan yang humanis (2014)

=== International publications ===
- "Does the implementation of the management function have an impact on service quality? A study at the HSC fitness center" (International Journal of Human Movement and Sports Sciences 9 (5), 1019-1028)
- "Utilization of sport performance laboratory to identify health and physical condition of the fitness members" (International Journal Humanitarian Responsibilities, Education & Sport Sciences 1 (1) 1-6)
