= Atma Jaya University, Yogyakarta =

University in Yogyakarta, Indonesia

Coordinates: 7°46′49″S 110°24′51″E

Atma Jaya Yogyakarta University
- Universitas Atma Jaya Yogyakarta
- Motto: Serviens in lumine veritatis;(Latin); Serving in the light of truth (English)
- Type: Private
- Established: September 27, 1965
- Rector: Prof. Ir. Yoyong Arfiadi, M.Eng., Ph.D
- Academic staff: 305
- Students: 11,106
- Location: Sleman, Indonesia
- Campus: Urban Campus I (St. Alphonsus Building) Campus II (St. Thomas Aquinas Building) Campus III (St. Bonaventura Building) Campus IV (Mother Theresa Building)
- Colors: Blue, Yellow, White

Atma Jaya University Yogyakarta (Indonesian: Universitas Atma Jaya Yogyakarta) (Javanese: ꦈꦤꦶꦮ꦳ꦼꦂꦱꦶꦠꦱ꧀ꦄꦠ꧀ꦩꦗꦪꦔꦪꦺꦴꦒꦾꦏꦂꦠ, romanized: Univêrsitas Atma Jaya Ngayogyakarta), abbreviated as UAJY, is a university located in Depok, Sleman Regency, Special Region of Yogyakarta, Indonesia. UAJY is one of the 50 most promising university and one of the best six universities in Indonesia in quality assurance according to Directorate of Higher Education, Department of National Education. Currently the university offers 12 undergraduate and 7 graduate programs, with an estimated ±11.307 students. There are four main campus buildings: Alfonsus Building in Mrican, Thomas Aquinas Building in Babarsari, Bonaventura Building in Babarsari, Teresa Building in Babarsari.

== History ==
The university was established on 27 September 1965 by the Yogyakarta branch of the Atma Jaya Catholic University Institute of Indonesia. The founders were R. A. Soehardi, A. J. Liem Sioe Siet A., Sutijoso, Oey Liang Lee and Leo Sukoto. The name of “Atma Jaya” is taken from Sanskrit. Atma means soul, Jaya means superior. Thus, Atma Jaya means a superior soul. UAJY’s aspiration from the beginning is to provide higher education with excellence in academics and education with high moral values.

Originally an extension of the Universitas Atma Jaya in Jakarta, it became an independent university under the auspices of the Slamet Rijadi Foundation on 31 August 1973. The university borrowed classrooms from the IKIP (Teaching and Education Institute) Sanata Dharma, now the Universitas Sanata Dharma, until its own campus buildings, at Mrican Baru Street, were finished in 1980.

Growing student numbers led to the Faculty of Engineering and the Administration department being moved to a new building in Babarsari Road in 1990, in conjunction with the celebrations of the silver anniversary of the founding of the university. In 1995, the Economics Faculty and the Postgraduate Program moved into a new building beside the existing building in Babarsari Road. In 2005 a new building was built adjacent to the Faculty of Engineering and the Administration department to host the Faculty of Social and Political Science. The University also acquired the former BHS Bank building to host administrative department.

An integrated four-story library was built next to the Faculty of Social and Political Science building. It will host library and Information Systems Center. The library building officially opened in a Mass led by Mgr. Ignatius Suharyo (archbishop) in October 2009.

In the late part of 2010, a project for the construction of a new building was started. In the original plan, it was planned to be an addition to the Faculty of Social and Political Science Building. On the east side of the current building there is a newer building that is next to it.

== Faculties ==
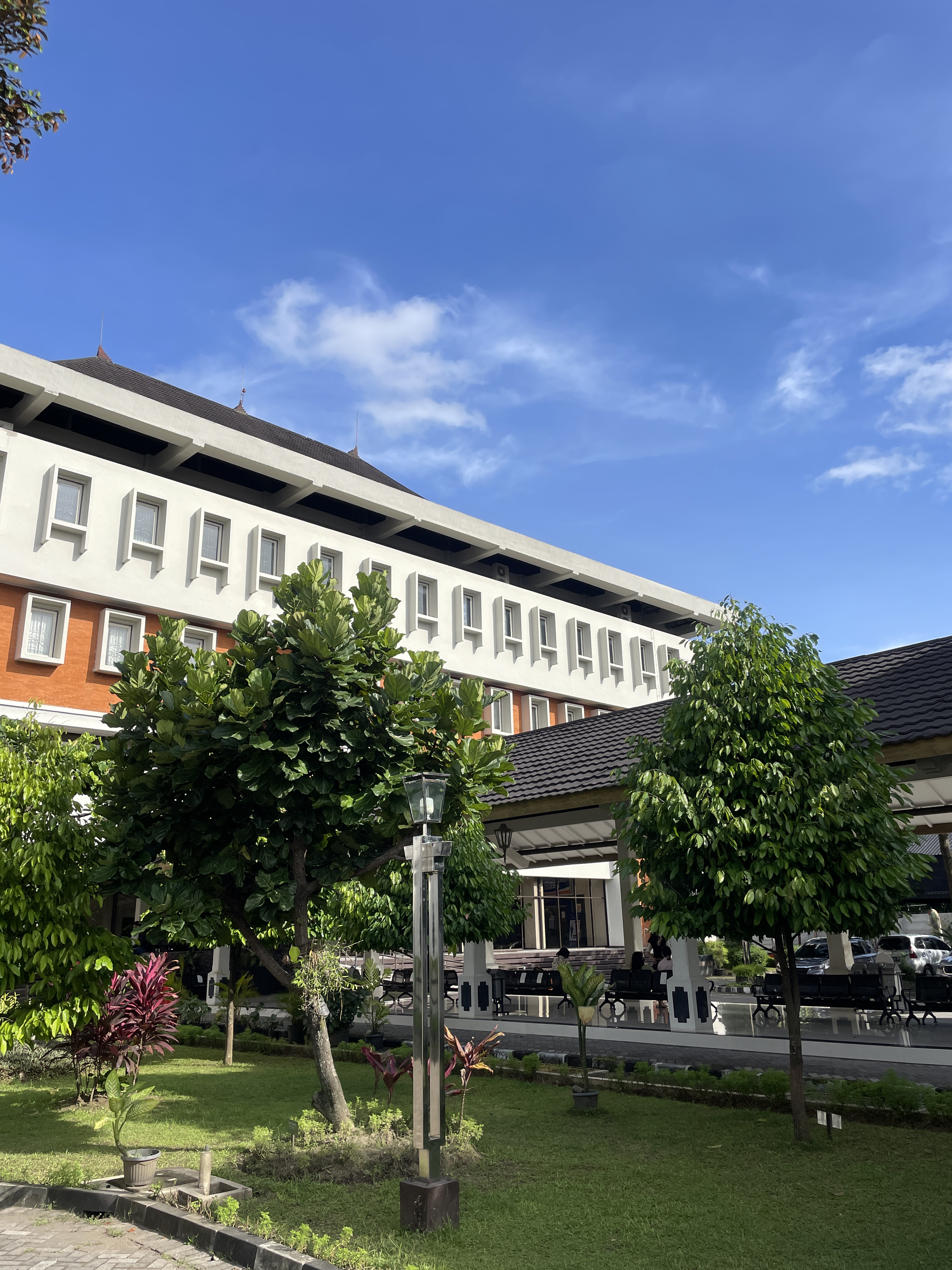
Bonaventura Building, one of UAJY campuses

1. Engineering (Thomas Aquinas Building)
  - Civil Engineering (offering international class)
  - Architecture
2. Economics (Bonaventura Building)
  - Management (offering international class)
  - Accounting (offering international class)
  - Economic and Development studies
3. Law (Alfonsus Building)
  - Economics and Business Law
  - Criminal Justice
  - Land and Environmental Law
  - Constitutional and Government Law
  - International Relations Law
  - Social Welfare Law
4. Technobiology (Thomas Aquinas Building)
  - Environmental Technobiology
  - Industrial Technobiology
  - Food Technobiology
5. Industrial Technology (Bonaventura Building)
  - Industrial Engineering (offering international class)
  - Informatics Engineering
  - Information Systems
6. Social and Political Science (Teresa Building)
  - Communications
  - Sociology

== Reputation and Rankings ==
Since 2018, Universitas Atma Jaya is accredited A by BAN-PT (National Accreditation Board for Higher Education of Indonesia).

National Rankings
Source	Year	Ranking
National
Webometrics	2020	28
Kemendikbud	2020	38
uniRank	2021	46
Global
Webometrics	2020	3395
uniRank	2021	2816

== See also ==
- Education in Indonesia
- List of universities in Indonesia
