= Chairperson of the Presidential Advisory Council =

Aspect of the Indonesian government

The Chairperson of the Presidential Advisory Council of the Republic of Indonesia (abbreviated as Chairperson of Wantimpres) is the leader of the Presidential Advisory Council of the Republic of Indonesia. The Chairperson of Wantimpres also doubles as a member. The position of Chairperson of Wantimpres can be held alternately among the members appointed by the President. This position was first held by Ali Alatas on April 10, 2007.

== List ==
No.	Chairperson	Portrait	Party	Term start	Term end	Time tenure	President	Ref.
1	Ali Alatas (1932–2008)		Golkar	10 April 2007	11 December 2008	1 year, 245 days	Susilo Bambang Yudhoyono (2004–2014)	
2	Tiopan Bernhard Silalahi (1938–2023)		Democratic	11 December 2008	20 October 2009	313 days	Susilo Bambang Yudhoyono (2004–2014)	
Vacant							Susilo Bambang Yudhoyono (2004–2014)	
3	Emil Salim (born 1930)		Golkar	25 January 2010	20 October 2014	4 years, 268 days	Susilo Bambang Yudhoyono (2004–2014)	
Vacant							Joko Widodo (2014–2024)	
4	Sri Adiningsih (1960–2023)		Independent	27 January 2015	20 October 2019	4 years, 266 days	Joko Widodo (2014–2024)	
5	Wiranto (born 1947)		Independent	13 December 2019	20 October 2024	4 years, 312 days	Joko Widodo (2014–2024)	
6	Pratikno (born 1962)		Independent	2 October 2026	Incumbent	23 days	Prabowo Subianto (Incumbent)	
