= Said Aqil Siradj =

Indonesian Islamic scholar (born 1953)

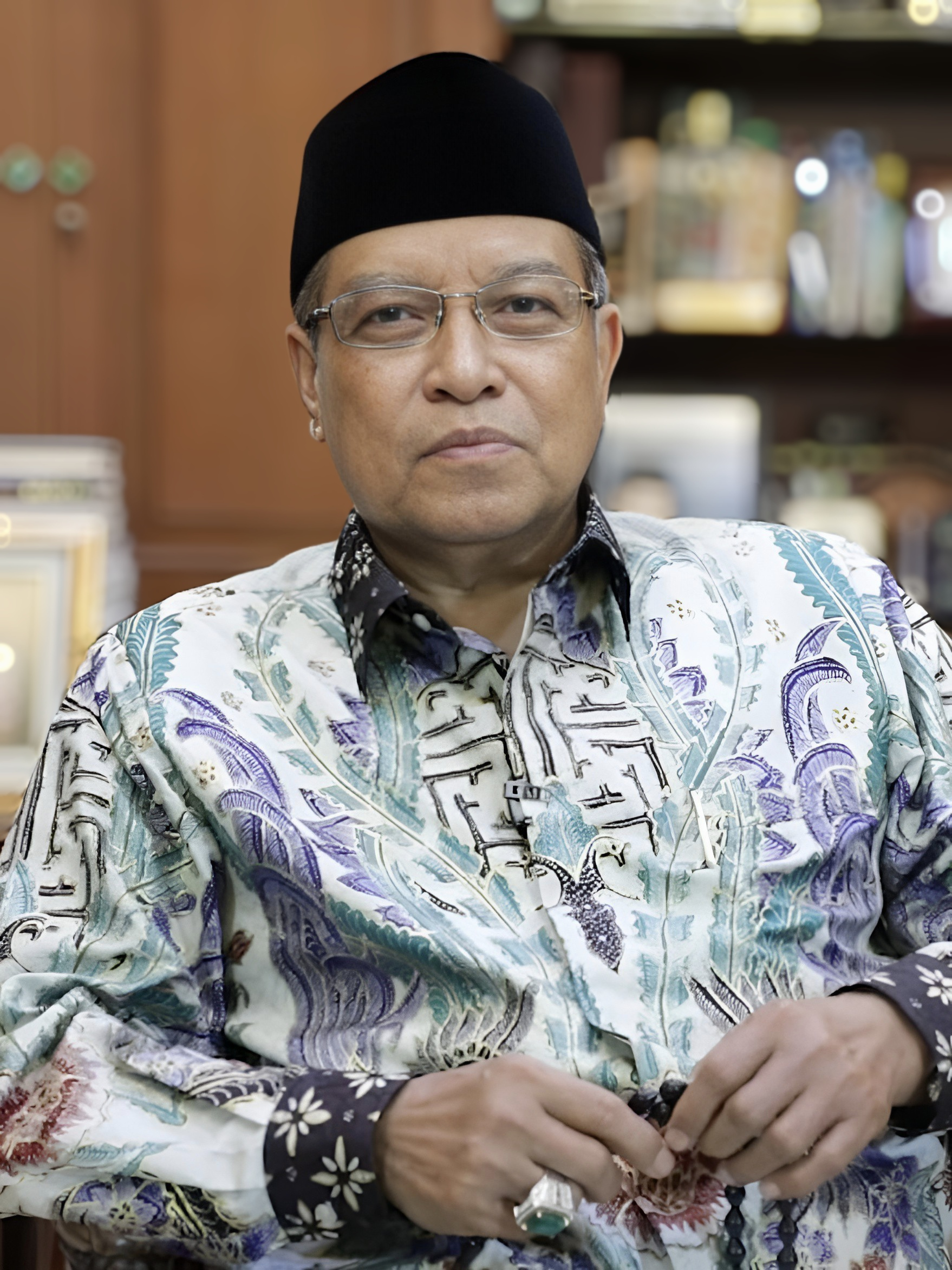
- Siradj in 2020

Chairman of the Executive Council of Nahdlatul Ulama
- In office 27 March 2010 – 24 December 2021
- Preceded by: Hasyim Muzadi
- Succeeded by: Yahya Cholil Staquf

Personal details
- Born: July 3, 1953 (age 73) Cirebon, West Java, Indonesia
- Citizenship: Indonesian
- Education: King Abdul Aziz University (BA in Ushuluddin and Da'wah); Umm Al-Qura University (MA in Comparative Religion) (MA in Aqidah and Islamic Philosophy)

Said Aqil Siradj (born 1953) is an Indonesian Islamic scholar and former chairman of the executive council of Nahdlatul Ulama, the largest Islamic organization in the world. The most recent publication of The 500 Most Influential Muslims by the Royal Islamic Strategic Studies Centre in Jordan ranked him as the 20th most influential Muslim person in the world.

Siradj has consistently spoken out in opposition to the November 2016 Jakarta protests. Siradj cited a fatwa that prohibited praying in the street as the protesters had planned since it disturbed the peace, though his position was immediately opposed by Indonesian Ulema Council, an organization specifically of religious leaders which includes Nadhlatul Ulama leaders. Siradj event cited the positions of the Maliki and Shafi'i schools of thought within Sunni Islam that prohibit praying the congregational prayers in the middle of a street.

In addition to his leadership within Nahdlatul Ulama, Siradj also founded the Said Aqil Centre, an organization in Egypt which focuses on developing Islamic discourse in the Middle East, and since 2021 has become the chairman of the board of commissioners of Kereta Api Indonesia.

Non-profit organization positions
Preceded by Hasyim Muzadi	Chief Executive of NU; 2015–2021	Succeeded by Yahya Cholil Staquf
