= Yogyakarta State University =

University in Indonesia

Coordinates: 7.7713847°S 110.3774998°E

- ꦈꦤꦶꦮ꦳ꦼꦂꦱꦶꦠꦱ꧀ꦤꦒꦫꦶꦔꦪꦺꦴꦒꦾꦏꦂꦠ
- Emblem of Yogyakarta State University
- Former name: Institut Keguruan dan Ilmu Pendidikan Yogyakarta (1964–1996)
- Motto: Leading in Character Education
- Type: Public university
- Established: 21 May 1964
- Affiliations: ASAIHL; AUN-QA; AQAS; ASIC; FIBAA; BAN-PT; LPTK; FKP2TN; LLDIKTI V Yogyakarta
- Rector: Sumaryanto
- Academic staff: 1.531 (as of 2025)
- Administrative staff: 885 (as of 2025)
- Students: 51.016 (as of 2025)
- Undergraduates: 43.292
- Postgraduates: 5.108
- Doctoral students: 2.616
- Other students: 26.773 (PPG and PPI, as of 2025)
- Location: Sleman Regency, Special Region of Yogyakarta, 55281, Indonesia
- Campus: 432.613 square metres (4,656.61 sq ft) (See full); Urban
- Colours: Blue (undergraduate); Dark blue (postgraduated)
- Website: www.uny.ac.id

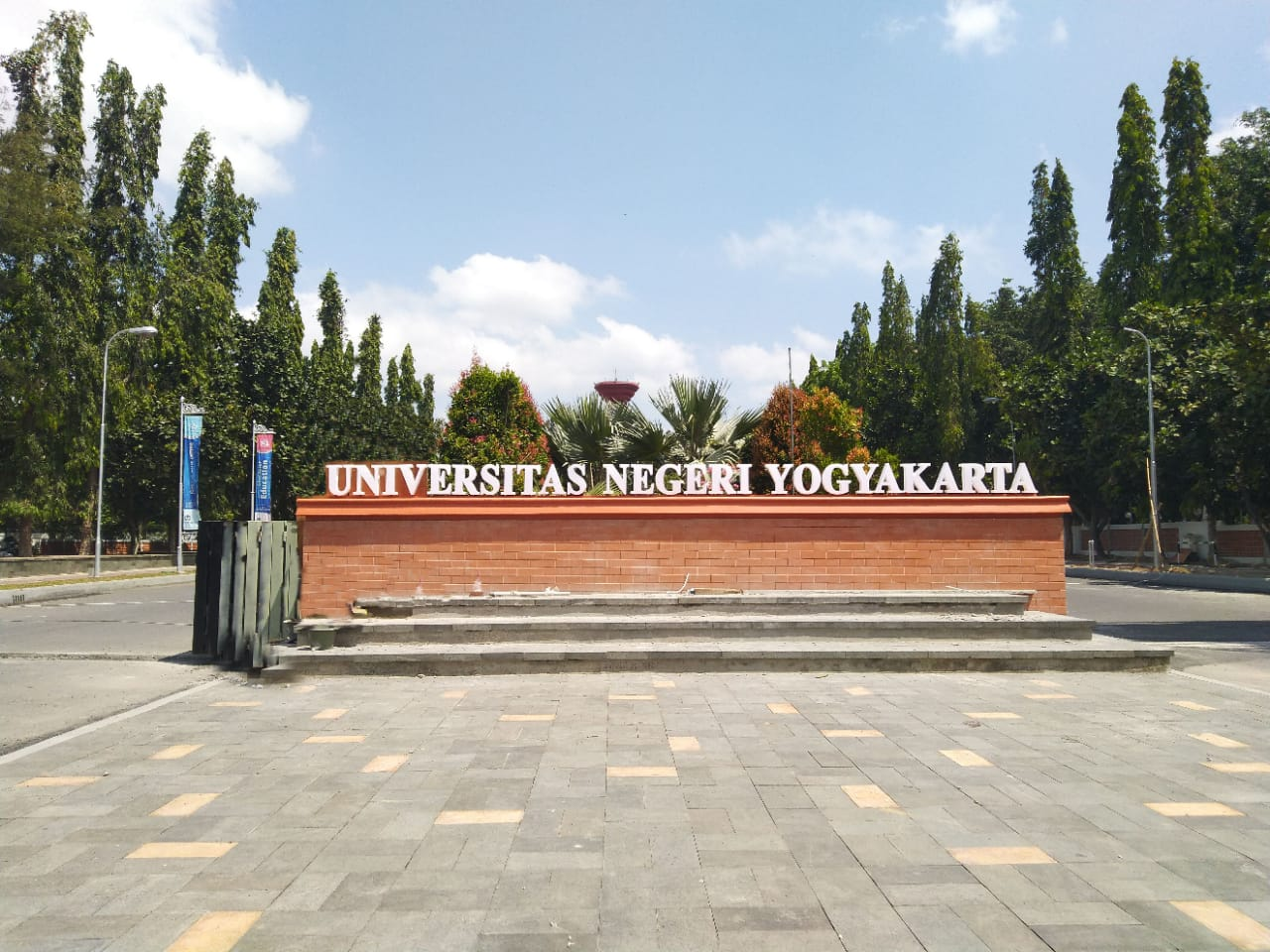
UNY signage at its main campus

Yogyakarta State University (or State University of Yogyakarta; Indonesian: Universitas Negeri Yogyakarta, abbreviated as UNY) is a public state university established in Special Region of Yogyakarta, Indonesia in 1964. The university's main campus is located in Sleman Regency. UNY was previously part of a faculty at Gadjah Mada University which eventually formed a separate institution called the Yogyakarta Teacher Training and Education Institute (IKIP Yogyakarta). UNY has also been considered one of the best teacher educational institutions in Indonesia, along with the Indonesian University of Education and the State University of Malang.

== History ==
State University of Yogyakarta (formerly IKIP Yogyakarta or Yogyakarta Institute of Teacher Education and Educational Sciences) was founded on May 21, 1964. IKIP Yogyakarta was a merger of two educational institutions: the Faculty of Pedagogy of Gadjah Mada University and the Institute of Teacher Education. They offered study programs of education sciences and teacher education. The merger was mandated by the Presidential Decree of the Republic of Indonesia, Number I/1963.

On August 4, 1999, the President of the Republic of Indonesia, by Presidential Decree No. 93/1999, officially declared that IKIP Yogyakarta was converted into the State University of Yogyakarta (abbreviated as SUY). It expanded the institution's mandate to offer other programs. The conversion of IKIP Yogyakarta from a specialized training institution into a comprehensive university was based on some considerations. One of them is the observation that the organizational structure of an educational institution was insufficient to support scientific development and that the number of graduates of IKIP Yogyakarta who entered non-teaching fields also increased. In carrying out the wider mandate, SUY initially offered 12 non-education study programs at the bachelor level and three-year undergraduate diploma levels in the following faculties: the Faculty of Languages and Arts Education, the Faculty of Mathematics and Natural Sciences Education, and the Faculty of Engineering and Vocational Education. The non-education study programs include those offered in the Faculty of Sport Sciences and the Faculty of Economics.

To meet societal demands, in 2011 the Faculty of Social Sciences and Economics was divided into two separate faculties: the Faculty of Social Sciences and the Faculty of Economics. This was mandated through the Ministerial Decree No. 23/2011 about the Organization and Governance of SUY signed on 22 June 2011. SUY then has seven faculties.

As has been mentioned above, IKIP Yogyakarta was converted into SUY on August 4, 1999. However, the anniversary of IKIP Yogyakarta remains SUY's anniversary, i.e., May 21.

== Faculties ==
There are ten faculties:

- Faculty of Education Sciences
- Faculty of Mathematics and Natural Sciences
- Faculty of Language, Arts, and Culture
- Faculty of Engineering
- Faculty of Social Sciences, Law, and Political Sciences
- Faculty of Sports and Health Sciences
- Faculty of Economics and Business
- Faculty of Medicine
- Faculty of Psychology
- Faculty of Vocational Studies

UNY also has many postgraduate programs :

- Master Programs and Doctoral Programs

== Campuses ==
Yogyakarta State University is a multi-campus university, with one main campus and four regional campuses spread across several cities and district in the Special Region of Yogyakarta province. The main campus of is at Colombo Street No. 1, Sleman; other campuses are in Yogyakarta, Kulon Progo and Gunungkidul. The following is a list of the main campuses and areas of Yogyakarta State University:

List of Yogyakarta State University campuses
Campus	Name	Wide	Location
Main	Karangmalang Campus	432.613 m^{2}	Colombo St., No. 1, Caturtunggal, Depok, Sleman
UPP I	Mandala Campus	6.085 m^{2}	Kenari St., No. 6, Semaki, Umbulharjo, Yogyakarta
UPP II	Bantul Campus	10.166 m^{2}	Bantul St., No. 50, Gedongkiwo, Mantrijeron, Yogyakarta
UPP III	Wates Campus	38.981 m^{2}	Mandung St., Pengasih, Pengasih, Kulon Progo
UPP IV	Gunungkidul Campus	46.091 m^{2}	Kepuh, Pacarejo, Semanu, Gunungkidul

== Research and library ==
1025 research studies from 2010 to 2012, 9 (7 national and 2 international) research studies obtaining intellectual property rights in 2012, 261,802 books in SUY's central library consisting of public works, philosophy, psychology, religion, social sciences, languages, fundamental sciences, applied sciences & technology, arts & sports, literature, and history & geography (as of April 2013)

- A provided access to online publications such as journals and newsletters
- A library in each faculty and school at SUY

== IEDQA ==
The Institute of Educational Development and Quality Assurance (IEDQA) is one of main structures at State University of Yogyakarta. IEDQA conducts several programs such as planning, implementing, as well as monitoring and evaluating educational development, quality assurance, and professional development. It has nine centers:

- Center for Quality Assurance
- Center for Curriculum, Instructional, and Learning Resources
- Center for Field Teaching Practicum and Fieldwork Practicum
- Center for Teaching, Non-Teaching, and Non-Educational Professions
- Center for University Level Subjects
- Center for Language Studies
- Center for Character Education and Culture Development
- Center for Career Development
- Center for Scientific Publications Development

== Rectors ==
- Johar (1991–1999)
- Suyanto (1999–2006)
- Sugeng Mardiyono (2006–2008)
- Rochmat Wahab (2008–2017)
- Sutrisna Wibawa (2017–2021)
- Sumaryanto (2021–)

== Notable alumni ==
- Putu Gede Juni Antara, association football player
- Hanung Bramantyo, film director
- Septian David, association football player
- Evan Dimas, association football player
- Hansamu Yama, association football player

== Gallery ==
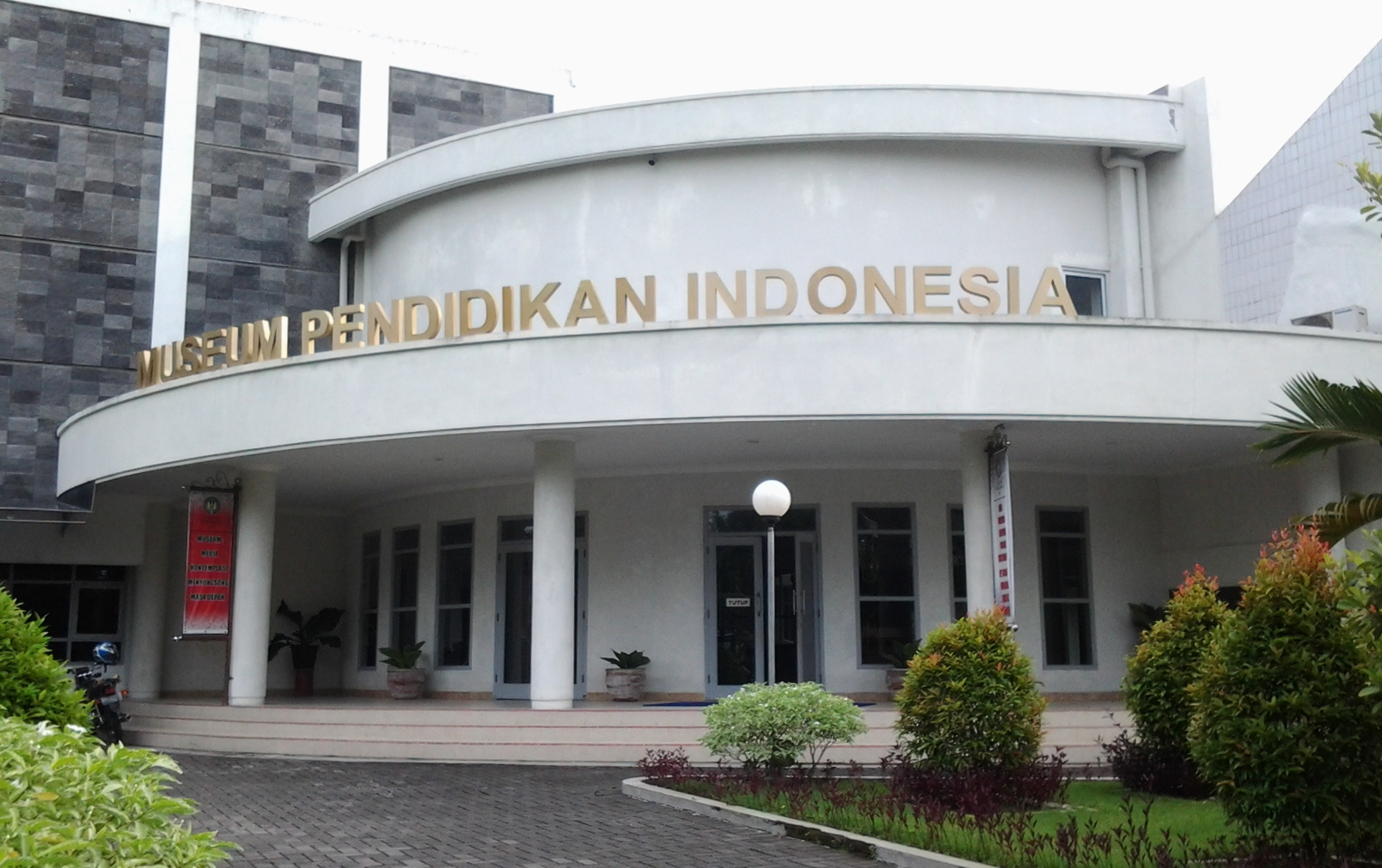
Museum of Indonesian Education (Museum Pendidikan Indonesia) inside the campus

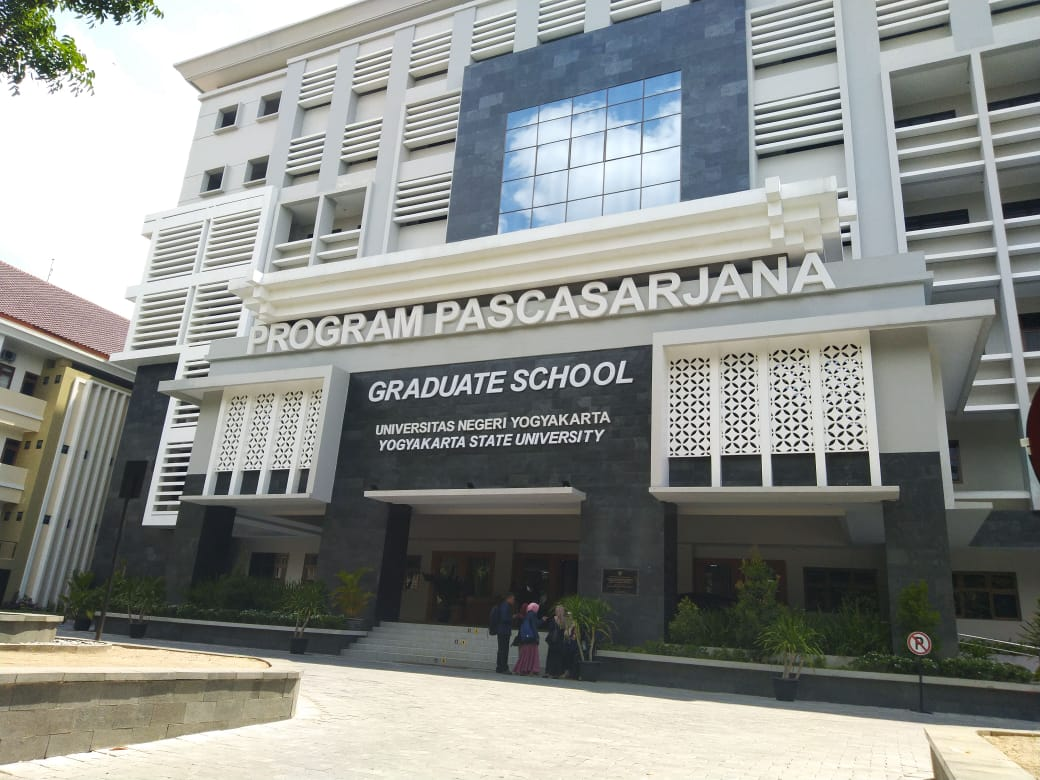
UNY postgraduate campus

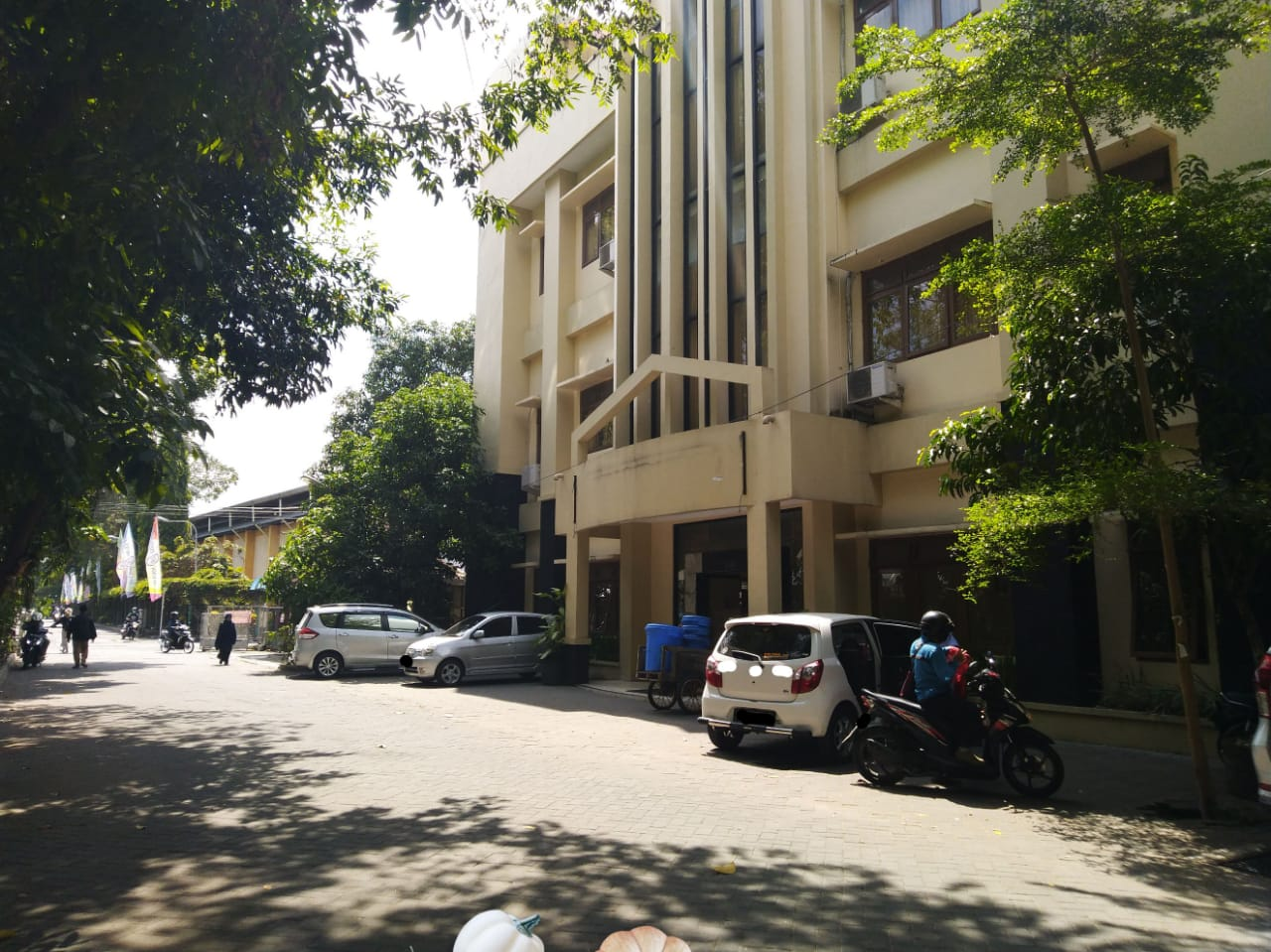
UNY Faculty of Mathematics and Natural Sciences integrated lab

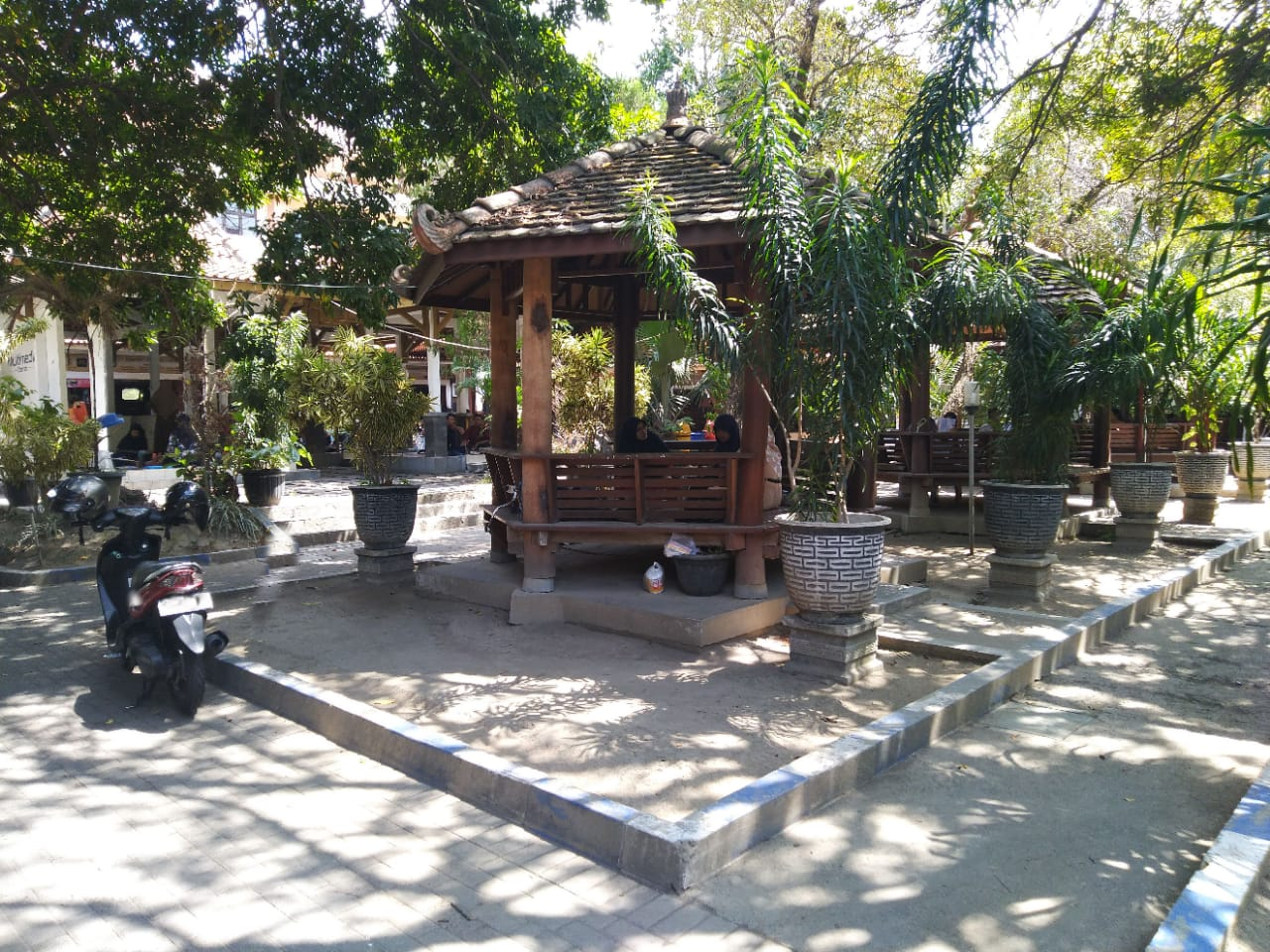
UNY foodcourt
