= Sunan Gunung Djati State Islamic University Bandung =

University in Bandung, West Java, Indonesia

UIN Sunan Gunung Djati
- Type: Islamic university
- Established: 1968
- Affiliations: Islam
- Rector: H. Rosihon Anwar
- Location: Bandung, Indonesia
- Website: UIN SGD

Sunan Gunung Djati State Islamic University Bandung, also known as UIN Bandung or often abbreviated as UIN SGD (formerly IAIN Sunan Gunung Djati), is a state Islamic university based in Cibiru District, Bandung, West Java. The university has a history of cultivating the intellectual background for Islamic movements and organizations, Nahdlatul Ulama. The university is named after Sunan Gunungjati, who was one of the Wali Sanga, the legendary Sufi figures who contributed greatly to the spread of Islam in Indonesia.

== History ==
The history of State Islamic University (UIN) Sunan Gunung Djati Bandung is linked with IAIN Sunan Gunung Djati Bandung because UIN (State Islamic University) is a continuation and development of IAIN (State Islamic Institute). IAIN Sunan Gunung Djati Bandung was established on the 8th of April, 1968 (10 Muharram 1388) based on the Decree of the Minister of Religious Affairs No. 56 in 1968. The founding of IAIN Sunan Gunung Djati Bandung is the result of the struggle by the Muslim leaders in West Java. Started in 1967, a number of community leaders and scholars led by Anwar Musaddad, A. Muiz, R. Sudja'i, and Arthata formed the IAIN Establishment Permit Committee with the approval of the governor of West Java. The committee was then approved by the Minister of Religious Affairs.

Supported by the Decree of the Minister of Religious Affairs, the committee inaugurated four faculties; the faculties of sharia, tarbiyah (religious education), ushuluddin (aqidah) in Bandung, and the faculty of tarbiyah in Garut. These four faculties are considered the basis of the university. In 1973, IAIN Sunan Gunung Djati moved to Tangkuban Parahu street no.14. In 1974 the university moved again to Cipadung (now A.H. Nasution) street no.105. In 1970, in the framework of consolidation, the faculty of tarbiyah in Bogor and the faculty of sharia in Sukabumi which originally belonged to IAIN Syarif Hidayatullah Jakarta were integrated with the parental faculties in Bandung. The faculty of tarbiyah in Cirebon originally affiliated with IAIN Syarif Hidayatullah was absorbed by the university as well on March 5, 1976.

In the next development, in 1993, two new faculties were established; the faculties of da'wah and adab. In 1997, the post-graduate program was opened. In the same year, there was a change in the structuring policy of IAIN as well. Based on the Presidential Decree No. 11 in 1997 dated March 21, 1997, the status of the faculty of tarbiyah in Cirebon which was originally a branch of the faculty of tarbiyah belonged to IAIN Sunan Gunung Djati Bandung was promoted to Islamic High School (STAIN) Cirebon. The faculty of sharia in Serang which was originally a branch of the faculty of sharia of IAIN Sunan Gunung Djati Bandung was upgraded to STAIN Serang. More recently, based on the presidential regulation no. 57 in 2005, dated October 10, 2005, (6 Ramadan 1426), IAIN changed its status to UIN Sunan Gunung Djati Bandung.

== Faculty ==
- Faculty of Adab and Humanity
- Faculty of Dawah and Communication
- Faculty of Sharia and Law
- Faculty of Tarbiyah and Teaching
- Faculty of Ushuluddin
- Faculty of Psychology
- Faculty of Science and Technology
- Faculty of Social Science and Political Science
- Faculty of Economy and Islamic Business
