= Agustinus Suhardi =

Government minister of Indonesia

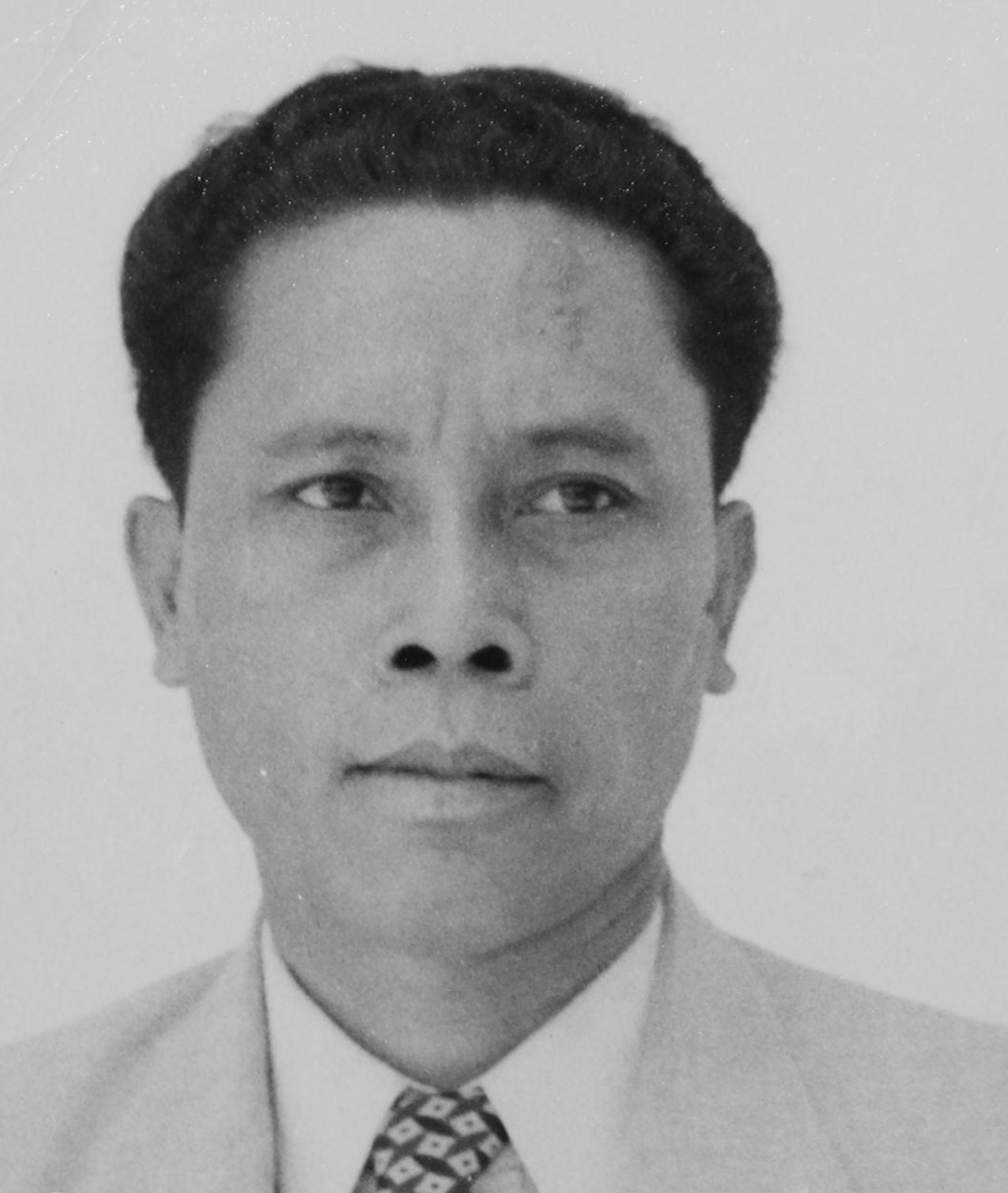
A. A. Suhardi

Raden Agustinus Suhardi (1899–1988) was a professor at Gadjah Mada University and fifth Agrarian Minister of Indonesia.

== Biography ==
Suhardi was born in Klaten, Central Java in 1899. He first studied at a school for native Indonesians, before moving to nearby Yogyakarta to study at a Meer uitgebreid lager onderwijs (middle school) there. For high school, he moved to Batavia (modern day Jakarta) and attended Canisius College. He then attended legal school, the Recht Hooge School, there.

Suhardi first found employment as a judge at a Dutch court in Tangerang, West Java. In 1946, he was transferred to Boyolali, Central Java, to head the court there. The following year he was transferred to Ngawi, East Java, to head the military court there. He later became the first Agrarian Minister of Indonesia. At the time he was also a lecturer at Gadjah Mada University (UGM).

Suhardi was a member of the UGM team that framed the Fundamental Agrarian Law in 1959. He was also a participant in the Asian–African Conference and part of the Catholic Faction in the Constitutional Assembly of Indonesia.

Suhardi died in 1988.

== Personal life ==
Suhardi was married to Agustina Siti Ruwiyah. Together they had five children.
