= T. B. Silalahi =

Indonesian military officer and politician (1938–2023)

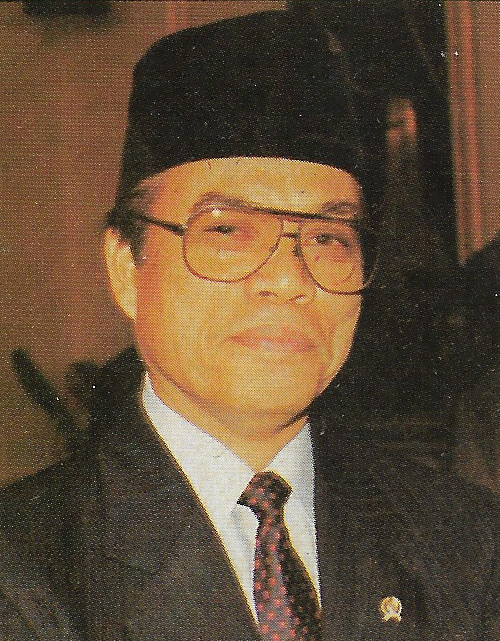
- Silalahi in 1993

2nd Chairperson of the Presidential Advisory Council
- In office 11 December 2008 – 20 October 2009
- President: Susilo Bambang Yudhoyono
- Preceded by: Ali Alatas
- Succeeded by: Emil Salim

6th State Minister of State Apparatus Utilization
- In office 17 March 1993 – 14 March 1998
- Preceded by: Sarwono Kusumaatmadja
- Succeeded by: Hartarto Sastrosoenarto

Personal details
- Born: Tiopan Bernhard Silalahi; 17 April 1938 Pematangsiantar, Dutch East Indies
- Died: 13 November 2023 (aged 85) Jakarta, Indonesia
- Party: Democratic
- Education: Padjadjaran University; Stanford University; De La Salle Araneta University

Military service
- Allegiance: Indonesia
- Branch/service: Indonesian Army
- Years of service: 1961–1993
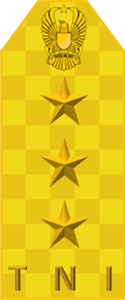
- Rank: Lieutenant general
- Unit: Cavalry

Tiopan Bernhard Silalahi (17 April 1938 – 13 November 2023) was an Indonesian military officer and politician. A member of the Democratic Party, he served as Minister of Public Servants from 1993 to 1998.

Silalahi died in Jakarta on 13 November 2023, at the age of 85.
