= Sri Adiningsih =

Indonesian politician (1960–2023)

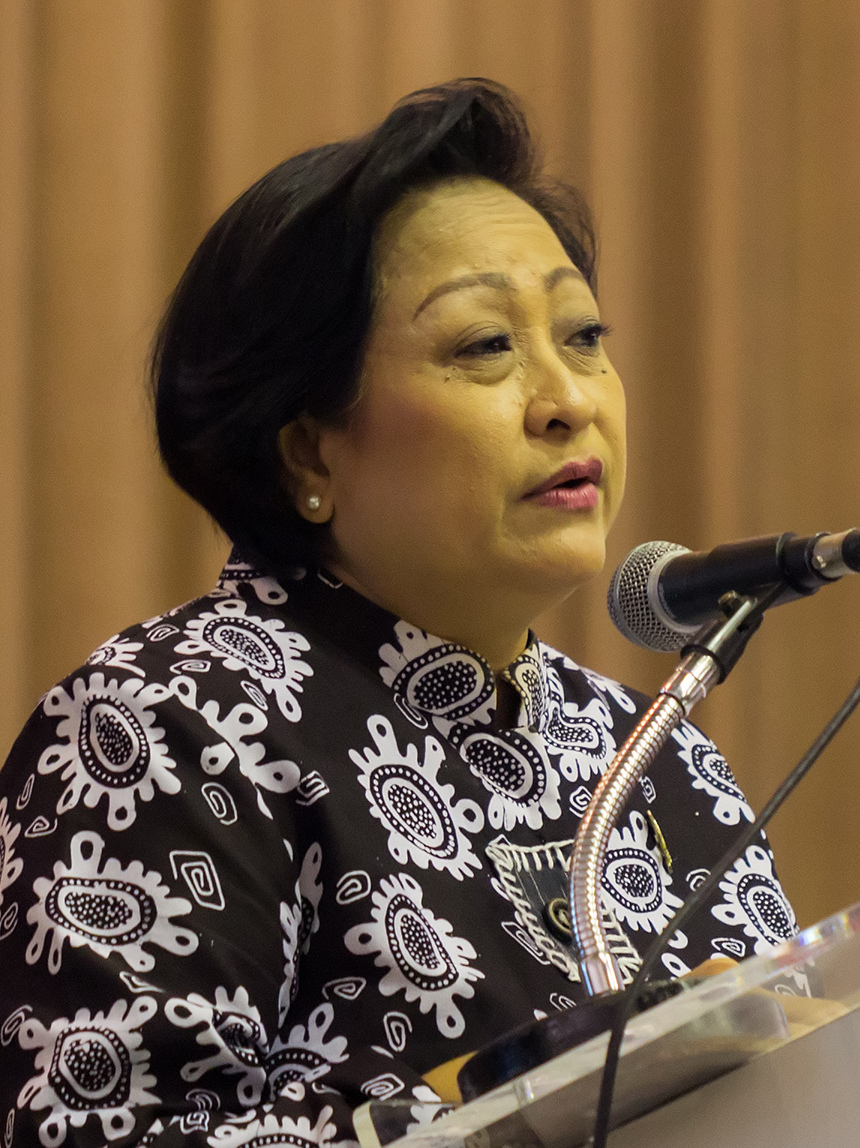
- Sri Adiningsih at the International Indonesia Forum, 2016

4th Chairperson of the Presidential Advisory Council
- In office 27 January 2015 – 20 October 2019
- President: Joko Widodo
- Preceded by: Emil Salim
- Succeeded by: Wiranto

Personal details
- Born: 11 December 1960 Surakarta, Central Java, Indonesia
- Died: 17 June 2023 (aged 62) Yogyakarta, Indonesia
- Spouse: Kunta Setiaji (m. 1985)
- Children: Stri Nariswari Setiaji
- Education: Gadjah Mada University; University of Illinois

Sri Adiningsih (11 December 1960 – 17 June 2023) was an Indonesian professor of economics at the Gadjah Mada University who served as the chairperson of the Presidential Advisory Council from 19 January 2015 to 20 October 2019. She had also served as a member of the People's Consultative Assembly ad hoc expert team in 2001 and became the secretary of the Constitutional Commission.

== Early life and education ==
Sri Adiningsih was born on 11 December 1960 in Surakarta as the eldest child of five. Her grandfather was a former Defenders of the Homeland soldier, a paramilitary organization established during the Japanese occupation of the Dutch East Indies. Her father, Daswadi, died while she was in the third grade of elementary school, and Sri had to live with her mother, Sri Lulut, who managed a grocery store alone. Sri spent most of her childhood in Surakarta and met to-be president Joko Widodo while studying at the 1st Surakarta State Junior High School.

Upon completing high school, Sri Adiningsih applied to the Gadjah Mada University (UGM) and was accepted in both the medicine and economics faculty. Her grandfather recommended her to pick economics. She entered the university in 1980 and joined the student senate and marching band. She was also a member of the Indonesian National Student Movement (GMNI, Gerakan Nasional Mahasiswa Indonesia).

Sri graduated in December 1985 with the cum laude distinction and continued her postgraduate studies at the University of Illinois. She obtained a masters and doctoral degree from the university in 1987 and 1996, respectively.

== Career ==
After obtaining her doctorate, Sri began to teach at the postgraduate program in UGM. She also worked as a researcher at the university's center for women studies, interuniversity center for economic studies, and the economic development research. She then began to hold leading positions in the university, serving as the head of the economics postgraduate program from 1996 until 2000, head of economic division of the Center for Asian and Pacific Studies from 2001, head of the Center for Asian and Pacific Studies, and the head of Economics and Business Research and Training Management in 2014. Sri was made a full professor in economics by UGM on 19 August 2013. She was a member of the American Economic Association and the Indonesian Academy of Sciences.

Sri also worked to assist the government in economic and financial matters. She was a member of the expert team for the preparation of materials for the 1998 Outlines of State Policy, adviser and researcher of the Indonesian Bank Restructuring Agency, and member of the People's Consultative Assembly ad hoc expert team in 2001. Following four subsequent amendments to the Constitution of Indonesia from 1999 to 2002, Sri was appointed a member of a commission to evaluate the amendments.

During the 1997 Asian financial crisis and the economic reforms that occurred following fall of Suharto, Sri often provided commentaries for national and international publications. Sri criticized the government for "putting its own political interests ahead of national interests" during the handling of the Bank Bali scandal by the B. J. Habibie administration. On another occasion, Sri recommended the government to "create policies that are favorable to fostering new investments" during the severe unemployment crisis in 2002. In 2011, Sri was recommended by People's Consultative Assembly (MPR, Majelis Permusyawaratan Rakyat) speaker Taufiq Kiemas to become a minister in the Susilo Bambang Yudhoyono administration.

Sri was involved in the private sector. She was the adviser and principal economist for Exim Securities in 1997, head of the Bank Danamon audit commission from 2002 until 2003, and commissioner for the Indosat telecommunications corporation from 2002 until 2005.

=== Joko Widodo administration ===
Several months after the inauguration of Joko Widodo as president in 2014, Sri was nominated for the position of finance minister, but was rejected due to a lack of experience in managing the government's financial affairs. She was instead appointed a member of the Presidential Advisory Council. She was installed as member on 19 January and was selected as its chairperson on 27 January. Sri's appointment to the council was linked to her involvement in assisting Megawati Sukarnoputri—the chairman of Joko Widodo's PDIP party—in economic affairs during her presidential campaign. Sri officially ended her tenure as a member and chairperson of the council on 20 October 2019. She was replaced by Wiranto on 13 December 2019.

== Personal life and death ==
Sri married Kunta Setiaji, a physician from UGM, in 1985. Their only child, Stri Nariswari Setiaji, worked as an expert staff in the Presidential Advisory Council and consultant to several overseas corporations. Sri was a Protestant Christian.

Sri died on the evening of 17 June 2023 at the Sardjito Hospital in Yogyakarta. She was 62. Various officials, such as finance minister Sri Mulyani, public works minister Budi Karya Sumadi, former vice president Boediono, former MPR speaker Sidarto Danusubroto, and UGM's dean of economics and business Didi Achjari, all delivered their condolences. She was interred at the Gunung Sempu Hill Memorial Park in Bantul a day after her death.

Government offices
Preceded by Emil Salim	Chairperson of the Presidential Advisory Council; 2015–2019	Succeeded by Wiranto
