= Sunan Kalijaga State Islamic University =

Public university in Yogyakarta, Indonesia

Sunan Kalijaga State Islamic University Yogyakarta
- Universitas Islam Negeri Sunan Kalijaga Yogyakarta
- Type: Public university
- Established: 26 September 1951
- Affiliations: Islam
- Rector: Prof. Dr. Phil. Al Makin, S.Ag., M.A.
- Location: Sleman Regency, Special Region of Yogyakarta, Indonesia
- Website: www.uin-suka.ac.id/en

Sunan Kalijaga State Islamic University Yogyakarta (Indonesian: Universitas Islam Negeri Sunan Kalijaga Yogyakarta, abbreviated as UIN Sunan Kalijaga or simply UIN Suka) is an Indonesian state university in Sleman Regency, Special Region of Yogyakarta that offers study programs in the field of Islamic science. Currently the university offers programs in Adab, Da'wah, Sharia, Tarbiya, Ushuluddin, Science and technology, Social Science and Humanities, Islamic Business and Economy. The university is named after Sunan Kalijaga, a member of the Javanese group of wali called Wali Sanga.

== History ==
The desire to establish Islamic institutions of higher education has been present since the colonial era. Dr. Wirjosandjojo Satiman stressed the importance of establishing an Islamic institute of higher education in order to raise the self-esteem of Muslims in the Dutch East Indies. Such an institution was established on July 8, 1945, when the Islamic High School was built in Jakarta. During the revolution the Islamic High School was moved to Yogyakarta, and reopened on April 10, 1946. In November 1947 a committee was formed to discuss improvements to the High School, and an agreement to establish the Indonesian Islamic University was reached on March 10, 1948. The university had four faculties: religion, law, economics, and education.

The government recognized the nationalist groups who had participated in the revolution by constructing the University of Gadjah Mada in 1950. The development of the Islamic University of Indonesia has occurred rapidly, with the Faculty of Indonesia consisting of 22 branches.

Based on the Presidential Decree No. 50/2004, IAIN Sunan Kalijaga was transformed into the State Islamic University (UIN) Sunan Kalijaga. This has encouraged UIN Sunan Kalijaga to make development in various areas, including management and academic fields. Links with various organisations both inside the country and abroad are also being developed.

Currently, there are 8 school/faculties in the university, which include:

1. School of Adab dan Ilmu Budaya (Humanities)
2. School of Ushuluddin, dan Pemikiran Islam (Islamic Philosophy and Theology)
3. School of Dakwah dan Komunikasi (Islamic Communication and Social Welfare)
4. School of Syariah dan Hukum (Laws)
5. School of Ilmu Tarbiyah dan Keguruan (Education)
6. School of Ilmu Sosial dan Humaniora (Social Sciences)
7. School of Ekonomi dan Bisnis Islam (Islamic Economics)
8. School of Sain dan Teknologi (Science and Technology)

== See also ==
- List of Islamic educational institutions
