= Hasyim Muzadi =

Indonesian Islamic scholar and cleric (1944–2017)

Kyai Haji Hasyim Muzadi
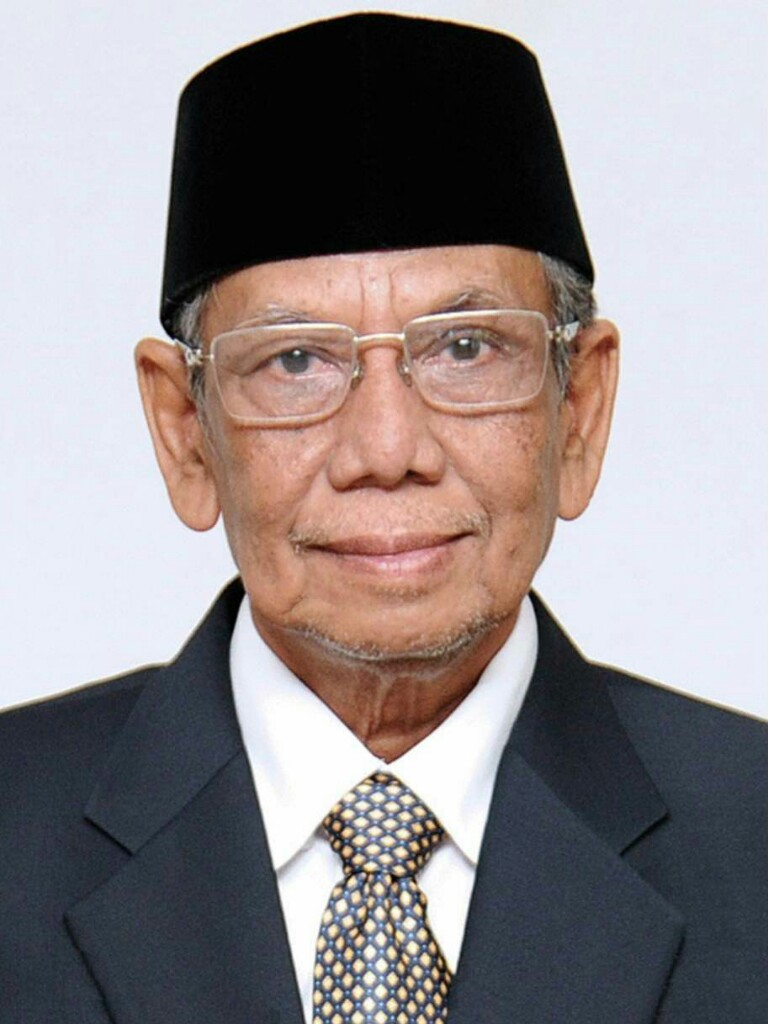
- Official portrait, 2015

Member of the Presidential Advisory Council
- In office 19 January 2015 – 16 March 2017

Chairman of the Nahdlatul Ulama
- In office 1999–2010
- Preceded by: Abdurrahman Wahid
- Succeeded by: Said Aqil Siradj

Personal details
- Born: 8 August 1944 Tuban, Japanese East Indies
- Died: 16 March 2017 (aged 72) Malang, Indonesia
- Occupation: Scholar; cleric; politician
- Organization: Nahdlatul Ulama

Achmad Hasyim Muzadi (8 August 1944 – 16 March 2017) was an Indonesian Islamic scholar and cleric who served as chairman of the Nahdlatul Ulama, from 1999 to 2010. The founder and director of the Al-Hikam Islamic boarding school, he was a proponent of moderate Islam, which he defined as being neither radical nor liberal, and criticized both Islamic fundamentalism and Islamic liberalism. Hasyim was the vice presidential running mate of President Megawati Sukarnoputri in the 2004 Indonesian presidential election, though the ticket was defeated in a runoff. He subsequently served in the Presidential Advisory Council from 2015 until his death.

== Early life and education ==
Hasyim was born on 8 August 1944 in Tuban, East Java, then occupied by Japan. His father's name was Muzadi and his mother's Rumyati. He attended various Islamic schools, including a pesantren, an Islamic boarding school, in Gontor, Ponorogo Regency. He obtained a college degree in tarbiyah (Islamic education) from the State Islamic Institute of Malang in 1969.

== As Islamic cleric and scholar ==
=== Al-Hikam Islamic boarding school ===
He founded the Al-Hikam Islamic boarding school (pesantren) in Lowokwaru, Malang, East Java, in March 1992. The pesantren provided a college-level mix of general and Islamic education. The school was small, with 125 students by 2000, but according to Islamic scholar and anthropologist Ronald Lukens Bull it seemed "an innovative and forward-thinking approach" to shaping the future of Indonesia.

According to Hasyim, who was also Al-Hikam's director, the school was aimed at Muslims with non-religious majors whose knowledge and practice of Islam was lacking. Hasyim saw this group as susceptible to fundamentalism, which viewed tradition and modernity to be antagonistic, and he founded Al-Hikam to curb its growth among college students.

=== Nahdhlatul Ulama and other organizations ===
Hasyim was active in Nahdlatul Ulama (NU), the largest Islamic organization in Indonesia, from the 1960s onwards. From 1992 to 1999 he was the chairman of NU's regional chapter in East Java. In 1996, Hasyim was inducted as a khalifa (deputy) of the Qadiri-Naqshbandi Sufi order. and in 1999, he was elected Chairman of NU, replacing Abdurrahman Wahid who became the fourth President of Indonesia. Hasyim held the Chairman position for two terms, until 2010 when he could not run again because of term limit.

When Gus Dur faced removal from his position as President in 2001, NU supporters in East Java threatened to descend upon Jakarta should he be ousted. Several Golkar Party offices in East Java were set on fire. Trees were felled and laid across the main road stretching from Pasuruan to Banyuwangi.

“If Gus Dur were to be removed through constitutional means, I don’t believe there would be any resistance from the grassroots; however, the NU *kiai* (Islamic scholars) feel that Gus Dur is being forced out through unfair methods. For this reason, the *kiai* believe they must defend the President”

— Hasyim Muzadi, Chairman of the PBNU

In 2004, he co-founded the International Conference of Islamic Scholars (ICIS) with Hassan Wirajuda, an Indonesian diplomat and former foreign minister. This conference held interfaith dialogues and meetings, and was intended to improve relations between Islamic and Western communities after the September 11 attacks. During the War in Afghanistan (2001–present), he rejected calls to recruit NU members to fight a jihad against the United States-led coalition.

== Political career ==
Hasyim first met Gus Dur in 1979 at the 26th Nahdlatul Ulama (NU) Congress in Semarang. At that time, Gus Dur was not yet part of the NU leadership, whereas Hasyim was already attending as a representative for the NU’s Malang branch. During this 26th Congress, Gus Dur was appointed to the NU central executive board (PBNU). Following the Semarang congress, Gus Dur began visiting East Java more frequently a region that served as a major hub for NU’s influence. Both Gus Dur and Hasyim emerged as young NU intellectuals during a period when they were involved with various other Islamic organizations under the umbrella of the PPP during the New Order era.

Hasyim started his political career as a member of the city level parliament of Malang for the United Development Party (PPP). In 1986, he was elected a member of East Java's Regional People's Representative Council (DPRD), a provincial-level parliament. Following the collapse of the New Order regime and the inauguration of Abdurrahman Wahid as President of the Republic of Indonesia, Gus Dur focused on leading the National Awakening Party (PKB), while Hasyim became the General Chairman of the PBNU following the 1999 Lirboyo Congress. The positive relationship between Gus Dur and Hasyim began to fray after Hasyim was mentioned as a potential presidential candidate for the PKB during the party’s 2003 National Working Meeting.

As the 2004 presidential election approached, the differences in perspective between Wahid and Hasyim became increasingly pronounced. The PKB nominated Wahid as its candidate for President of the Republic of Indonesia; however, Wahid was ultimately unable to run in the 2004 election due to health reasons. Hasyim was subsequently proposed by Megawati Soekarnoputri to be her running mate under the banner of the Indonesian Democratic Party of Struggle (PDIP). Consequently, Hasyim entered the race without the blessing of Gus Dur or the support of the PKB. Hasyim was aware that his nomination as Megawati’s running mate would spark both support and opposition given that Nahdlatul Ulama (NU) had returned to its 1926 *khitah* (foundational principles) and he therefore agreed to take a leave of absence from his position as chairman of the PBNU (Executive Council of Nahdlatul Ulama) in 2004. The ticket secured 26.2% of the vote in the first round, placing second and triggering a runoff; however, Hasyim and the incumbent president were ultimately defeated by the pair of Susilo Bambang Yudhoyono and Jusuf Kalla.

Following the presidential election, the relationship between Gus Dur and Hasyim Muzadi did not immediately mend. Gus Dur intended to challenge Hasyim for the PBNU leadership during the NU National Congress (Muktamar) held in Boyolali, Central Java, in November 2004. Gus Dur argued that because Hasyim had become involved in practical politics, he ought to step down from his role within the organization. Backed by senior NU clerics (*kiai sepuh*) such as Kiai Abdullah Abbas and Kiai Muhaiminan Gus Dur sought to block Hasyim. Tensions ran high at the congress venue, the Donohudan Hajj Dormitory in Boyolali. Ultimately, however, the *Nahdliyin* (NU members) favored Kiai Hasyim, and he was re-elected to lead the PBNU. The senior clerics and Gus Dur even threatened to leave the organization and establish a rival group fortunately, that threat never materialized.

Although their relationship had grown cold due to differing political views and choices, the two appeared to set aside their grievances whenever they met. When Gus Dur’s daughter, Anita Hayatunnufus Rahman, held her wedding, several figures whom Gus Dur had frequently criticized were present to serve as witnesses for the ceremony. President Yudhoyono sat as a primary witness, while former political rivals such as Hasyim Muzadi and Akbar Tandjung also served as witnesses for the wedding ceremony held at Gus Dur’s residence in Ciganjur, South Jakarta likewise, when Gus Dur fell ill and subsequently passed away, Hasyim Muzadi made sure to visit.

During the 2014 presidential election, he joined the campaign team of Joko Widodo, who was later elected president. From 2015 until the end of his life, he served as a member of the Presidential Advisory Council, overseeing matters related to public welfare.

== Views ==
Hasyim was a proponent of moderate Islam, which he defined as being neither radical nor liberal. Fighting Islamic fundamentalism was one of his goals in founding Al-Hikam. The organization has identified students who harbor "strong religious sentiments but who have yet to receive solid religious training" as being "particularly susceptible to fundamentalism". It views the traditional teaching of pesantren and historical interpretations of the great Islamic scholars as tempering factors to combat extremism.

On the other hand, Hasyim disagreed with liberal Islam because of its tendency to "permit (make halal) all things", and criticized the youth of NU for being "more like Westerners in viewing Islam and tradition" because of their Western funding and training. Despite the disagreement, he did not call for liberal thought to be banned, and said that proper forums must be had to debate controversial issues in the community.

During the US invasion of Afghanistan in the wake of the September 11 attacks, Hasyim rejected calls in Indonesia to recruit members of NU for a jihad in Afghanistan. According to him, "jihad does not always mean holy war; efforts to develop Islam and the Muslim ummah are also called jihad". He said that the September 11 attacks were a "tragedy of humanity, not a tragedy of religion" and should not be turned into a religious conflict.

== Illness and death ==
In January 2017, the 72-year old Hasyim suffered from exhaustion after he had traveled to several places in Indonesia, directly after his return from a trip to Australia. He was treated at the Lavalette Hospital in Malang 6–17 from January, and then discharged in a stable condition. On 11 March, he was readmitted to the hospital. He was discharged on 13 March because he had chosen to recover at his house, against the recommendation of the hospital. The President of Indonesia Joko Widodo flew to Malang to visit him on 15 March. Hasyim died on 16 March on 06.15 Western Indonesian Time at his residence in the compound of the Al-Hikam Islamic boarding school.

He was buried on that same day at the second campus of Al-Hikam in Depok, West Java. Vice President of Indonesia Jusuf Kalla led the funeral procession. Hasyim's body was escorted by military and police personnel, members of Islamic organisations, and students of Al-Ihram in a military-style funeral starting at 16.15, local time.

Non-profit organization positions
Preceded by Abdurrahman Wahid	Chief Executive of NU; 1999–2010	Succeeded by Said Aqil Siradj
